= List of clubs in the Verbandsliga Südbaden =

This is a List of clubs in the Verbandsliga Südbaden, including all clubs and their final placings from the inaugural 1978–79 season to the current one. The league is the highest football league in the South Baden region of Baden-Württemberg. It is one of 35 leagues at the sixth tier of the German football league system. Until the introduction of the 3. Liga in 2008 it was the fifth tier of the league system, until the introduction of the Regionalligas in 1994 the fourth tier.

== Overview ==
The league was formed in 1978 to replace the league that existed in its place until then, the Amateurliga Südbaden, as the third tier in Baden-Württemberg. At the same time, the Amateur-Oberliga Baden-Württemberg was formed above it.

=== League timeline ===
The league went through the following timeline of name changes, format and position in the league system:

Years	Name	Tier	Promotion to
1978–94	Verbandsliga Südbaden	IV	Amateur-Oberliga Baden-Württemberg
1994–2008	Verbandsliga Südbaden	V	Oberliga Baden-Württemberg
2008–	Verbandsliga Südbaden	VI	Oberliga Baden-Württemberg

== League placings ==
The complete list of clubs in the league and their league placings.

=== 1978–1994 ===
The complete list of clubs and placings in the league while operating as a tier four league from 1978 to 1994:

Club	S	79	80	81	82	83	84	85	86	87	88	89	90	91	92	93	94
VfB Gaggenau	12	1	O	10	12	7	4	6	1	O	O	O	O	O	O	O	O
SC Pfullendorf	11	5	1	O	1	O	O	O	O	O	1	O	1	O	O	O	O
Freiburger FC	19	2B	2B	2B	2B	O	O	O	O	O	O	O	O	1	O	O	O
SV Linx	28				14	8	6	8	4	2	O	2	3	3	2	1	O
FV Donaueschingen	20							16				10	4	11	3	3	1
FC 08 Villingen	21	O	O	2	3	1	O	1	O	9	7	6	6	6	5	10	2
Bahlinger SC	19	6	7	7	8	3	2	5	5	5	6	12	13	9	8	6	3
SV Laufenburg	8															7	4
FC Emmendingen	24	15						7	6	4	3	1	O	2	6	5	5
SV Weil	27	3	6	8	11	4	1	O	7	11	12	14				11	6
FC Denzlingen	24													15			7
FC Teningen	15																8
FC Steinen-Höllstein	16											4	11	10	11	8	9
FC Rastatt 04	18	O	O	O	O	O	O	O	O	6	5	7	5	4	4	2	10
SV Endingen	21														7	4	11
SV Kuppenheim	27	O	O	1	O	O	O	O	8	3	2	9	2	5	10	12	12
SV Stadelhofen	16														14		13
Offenburger FV	20	O	O	O	O	O	O	O	O	O	O	O	O	O	9	9	14
TuS Lörrach-Stetten	12				2	5	3	9	2	7	9	3	9	8	1	O	15
Rot-Weiß Salem	3																16
VfR Achern	3	10	14													13	
FV St. Georgen	1															14	
SV Oberweiler	3														12	15	
VfR Stockach	4												10	7	13	16	
Kehler FV	15						5	15			11	15		12	15		
FC Konstanz	14	14	15								10	13	16		16		
FV Lörrach	6		8	13	13	15							7	13			
Sportfreunde/DJK Freiburg	12	7	4	6	4	12	9	11	3	1	O	5	8	14			
SV Kirchzarten	16	2	3	4	7	11	11	4	15		13			16			
ESV Südstern Singen	4				15		13	13						17			
SC Friesenheim	5									13	4	11	12				
Offenburger FV II	6			5	5	14	8	14					15				
FC Radolfzell	16			17		13	15		10	10	8	16					
FC Furtwangen	2									12	14						
SV Sinzheim	6					2	7	2	11	8	15						
Freiburger FC II	5			9	16				12	14	16						
SV Hausach	11	4	2	4	10	16		10	9	15							
SC Reute	3					10	14			16							
SC Freiburg II	7						10	3	13								
SV Bühlertal	7								14								
Phönix Durmersheim	7		5	12	9	9	12	12	16								
DJK Konstanz	3	O	O	O	6	6	16										
VfB Villingen	4	9	9	11	17												
SV Niederschofheim	3	8	10	14													
FC Singen 04	15	12	12	15													
FC Neustadt	9		11	16													
FC Gottmadingen	2	13	13														
VfB Rheinfelden	2	11	16														
FC Friedlingen	1	16															

=== 1994–present ===
The complete list of clubs and placings in the league while operating as the tier five (1994–2008) and six (2008–present) league:

Club	S	95	96	97	98	99	00	01	02	03	04	05	06	07	08	09	10	11	12	13	14	15	16	17	18	19	20	21	22	23
SC Freiburg II	7	5	2	7	1	O	O	O	O	O	O	O	O	O	O	R	R	R	R	R	R	R	R	O	O	R	R	R	3L	3L
Bahlinger SC	19	2	1	O	O	O	O	O	O	O	O	O	2	O	O	O	O	O	O	O	O	O	R	O	O	O	R	R	R	R
SV Oberachern	5																9	4	2	1	O	1	O	O	O	O	O	O	O	O
FC 08 Villingen	21	O	6	5	5	7	7	1	O	O	1	O	1	O	O	O	O	O	O	O	O	O	O	1	O	O	O	O	O	O
SV Linx	28	O	O	O	7	2	2	3	2	1	O	1	O	1	O	2	1	O	6	3	2	3	3	6	1	O	O	O	O	x
1. FC Rielasingen-Arlen	5																					6	2	5	5	1	O	O	O	O
Freiburger FC	18	3	3	9	6	14		10	10	6	7	5	11	6	4	13				8	1	O	O	2	2	2	O	O	O	O
FV Lörrach-Brombach	3																								4	10	1	O	O	x
Offenburger FV	20								6	4	2	4	3	2	1	O	2	1	O	O	5	8	1	O	8	3	2	3	1	O
FC Denzlingen	24	4	8	3	4	1	O	O	O	7	16		6	4	6	1	O	8	9	7	11	15		3	11	13	8	9	2	x
SV Waldkirch	11																	12	10	12	8	12	8	17		14	11	10	3	x
SV Kuppenheim	27	14		15		8	4	11	15						12	14					12	11	4	10	13	6	6	11	4	x
SC Lahr	7																						6	9	9	8	5	2	5	x
SC Pfullendorf	11	1	O	O	O	R	R	R	O	R	R	R	R	R	R	R	R	R	R	R	R	O	O	16		7	7	1	6	x
SF Elzach-Yach	4															10	15											12	7	x
SV Bühlertal	7																					13	10	15			10	5	8	x
FC Auggen	7																						5	4	10	4	12	6	9	x
FC Teningen	15	9	7	12	3	4	1	O	1	O	3	10	5	13													15	13	10	x
FC 08 Villingen II	2																											17	11	x
Kehler FV	15								13		17			5	2	O	O	O	O	O	O	O	O	7	6	9	3	4	12	x
FC Radolfzell	16																	14			10	2	13		3	5	9	8	13	
SV Weil	27	10	15									3	12	10	7	11	7	2	12	6	13						4	7	14	
DJK Donaueschingen	3																										14	15	15	
SC Durbachtal	2																											14	16	
SV Endingen	21	15		13	15			9	16							12	14		4	5	3	10	7	11	7	11	13	16	17	
1. SV Mörsch	5																		14					13	12	12	16			
FSV Rot-Weiß Stegen	1																									15				
TuS Oppenau	1																									16				
FC Bad Dürrheim	9										12	4	18						15		4	5	9	8	14					
SV Stadelhofen	16					11	8	13					4	11	8	9	3	7	5	11	16			12	15					
FC Singen 04	15	8	9	2	O	O	O	15		14							8	3	1	O	6	4	16		16					x
SC Hofstetten	2																	15							17					x
FC Neustadt	9					10	11	5	7	15														14	18					
SV Solvay Freiburg	5																			10	9	7	11	18						
FC Bötzingen	14								11	16		13		9	13	6	4	6	7	4	7	9	12							
SpVgg Frickingen	2																			13			14							
VfB Bühl	10											7	9	8	9	3	5	10	8	15			15							
FC St. Georgen	1																					14								
SC Offenburg	1																					16								
VfR Hausen	9												8	12	11	5	10	5	3	2	14									
SC Wyhl	1																				15									
FV Schutterwald	5																11	9	11	9	17									
FV Lahr	1																			14										
FV Donaueschingen	20	O	4	6	2	5	6	7	12	11	15			15				11	13	16										
FC Emmendingen	24	6	5	8	9	6	3	2	3	2	4	2	O	O	5	14			16											
SC Pfullendorf II	10						9	6	14			6	10	3	3	8	6	13												
SV Kirchzarten	2																12	16												
FC Rastatt 04	18	11	16					8	5	3	5	14			10	4	13													
FC Konstanz	14								4	10	6	9	7	14		7	16													
SV Oberkirch	7		10	10	13	16										15														
DJK Villingen	2							14							14															
FV Gamshurst	2													7	15															
FC Wehr 1912	3										8	15			16															
FC Wollmatingen	2												13	16																
FC Steinen-Höllstein	16	12	12	1	O	O	10	12	9	5	10	12	15																	
SV Rust	4									8	9	11	16																	
SV Laufenburg	8	7	14				14			12	11	16																		
FV Herbolzheim	3		13							9	13																			
SV Au am Rhein	1										14																			
SV Kirchzarten	16	16				3	5	4	8	13																				
VfB Gaggenau	12	O	O	4	8	9	12	16																						
FC Welschingen-Binningen	1						13																							
SV Oberweiler	3						15																							
SV Hausach	11				11	12	16																							
Lahrer SV	2				10	13																								
SC Gottmadingen	2				12	15																								
SV Kappel	2			11	14																									
Bahlinger SC II	1				16																									x
SV Litzelstetten	1			14																										
Rot-Weiß Salem	3		11	16																										
TuS Blumberg	1		17																											
SC Friesenheim	5	13																												
FV Rot-Weiß Elchesheim	0+																													x

=== Key ===
Symbol	Key
B	Bundesliga
2B	2. Bundesliga
3L	3. Liga
R	Regionalliga Süd (1994–2012) Regionalliga Südwest (2012–present)
O	Oberliga Baden-Württemberg
1	League champions
Place	League
Blank	Played at a league level below this league

- S = No of seasons in league (as of 2022–23)
