= Offenburger FV =

German football club

- Full name: Offenburger Fussball Verein 1907 e. V.
- Founded: 20 July 1907
- Ground: Karl-Heitz-Stadion
- Capacity: 15,000
- Chairman: Jürgen Görhardt
- Manager: Marc Lerandy
- League: Oberliga Baden-Württemberg (V)
- 2015–16: Verbandsliga Südbaden (VI), 1st (promoted)
Home colours	Away colours

Offenburger FV is a German association football club based in the city of Offenburg, Baden-Württemberg.

== History ==
=== Early years ===
The club was formed on 20 July 1907 under the name of FC 1907 Offenburg in what was then the Grand duchy of Baden. In its first couple of seasons, the club played mostly against teams from the other side of the river Rhine. The Alsace (German: Elsaß) region was then part of Imperial Germany. The FK Neudorf, now the Racing Club Strasbourg, was one of those teams.

It merged in February 1913 with the FV 1910 Offenburg to form the current Ofenburger FV 1907. In October of the same year, the club moved to its new home ground Stegermatt which it would remain at until completion of its current stadium in 1958.

With the beginning of the First World War, the club had to cease playing games for the time but re-formed a team in 1915 with the help of local soldiers. In 1916, the club won its first local title, winning the Oberrheingau championship. As the war continued, young students took the place of the soldiers who were sent to the front line and eventually, football ceased to be played completely. The club suffered losses during the war with 22 of its members not returning from the battlefields.

=== 1919 to 1933 ===
Late in the year 1918, the club reformed its team and was able to reenter competitive football in early 1919. The OFV played in the A-Klasse Oberrheingau, the second tier of football in the region. The club played an epic decider for promotion on 28 March 1920, losing to SC Freiburg 1–2 after a game that lasted for 204 minutes, until Freiburg scored the winning goal.

For the 1920–21 season, the club entered the A-Klasse Schwarzwaldgau for the first time and won the championship in this league in its first season. In the following promotion round, the club finished second and moved up a level. In the strong Kreisliga Südwest, the club was unable to succeed against clubs like Freiburger FC and Phönix Karlsruhe and was immediately relegated again.

Despite this reverse, the club opened a new grandstand at its home ground in October 1922.

Due to a reorganisation of the league system, the OFV found itself in a new league, the tier-II Befähigungsliga Baden, for the 1922–23 season. Above it was now the Bezirksliga Baden as the highest tier of football in the state. The club finished second-last in its first season and narrowly avoided relegation.

In January 1923, the region was occupied by France, following Germany's failure and inability to meet reparation payments. Due to heavy restrictions on local travel by the French authorities, the club's participation in football games was severely handicapped and most of its home games had to be played away. Despite this, the club finished fifth in its league in 1923–24.

The French troops left Offenburg soon after in 1924 and football was able to be played under more regular circumstances again. This showed in the club's performance, winning the Kreisliga Südbaden and earning the right to participate in the promotion round, where the club finished last. The following season, the club came second in its league, behind the relegated SC Freiburg. In the 1926–27 season, the league was split and the OFV did not have to compete with the stronger clubs from Freiburg and the league championship could be won once more. Despite an average performance in the following promotion round, the club was elevated to the Bezirksliga Württemberg-Baden thanks to another reorganisation of the league system, whereby the league was split into a Baden and a Württemberg division.

Back in first division football, the OFV fared quite well and finished fourth out of eight teams in the league. In 1928, the club hired Fritz Kläger as its long-term manager, he would coach the OFV uninterrupted until 1944 and again, after returning from the war, for another five years. The following season, however, was a disaster, with the Offenburger FV coming last and being relegated once more.

The club entered the 1929–30 season with a severely reorganised team and was in contention for the Kreisliga championship all season, eventually only falling to the local rival Kehler FV in a decider. 1930–31 saw almost a repeat of the previous season, only this time the OFV remained victorious against Kehl and qualified for the promotion round. Having archived Bezirksliga qualification already, the club was nevertheless forced to play a decider against the last-placed team of the Bezirksliga, the Freiburger FC. While the first game ended in a draw, the replay was won by the FFC and Offenburg had to remain in the second division.

In 1931–32, the club finally succeeded in its attempt to return to the highest league in Baden. After winning the Kreisliga once more, the OFV also finished on top of the six-team promotion round. In the Bezirksliga Baden, the club found live much harder and immediate relegation followed with a last-place finish.

=== 1933 to 1945 ===
With the Nazis' rise to power, football was once more reorganised in Germany. In place of the Bezirksliga Baden, the Gauliga Baden was established as the highest local football competition. The OFV was not part of this league in 1933, instead it entered the new Bezirksliga Oberbaden, the local second division.

The Nazis outlawed all sport and football clubs with connections to the workers movement or other organisations they saw as a thread and the local clubs SC 1929 Offenburg and DJK Offenburg were disbanded, adding a number of good players to the OFV line-up. The club won its local division in 1933–34 but lost to the FC 08 Villingen in the deciders for the Oberbaden championship. The following season went under similar circumstances, local champions but failing in the regional championship.

The 1935–36 season was not a success for the club and a fourth place was below the standards of the OFV, with the Kehler FV taking out the championship instead.

The year 1936 also saw an increase in influence for the Nazis in the club with the chairman Otto Eichin being replaced by the local Nazi propaganda leader (German: Kreispopagandaleiter) Philipp Nünlist.

Starting as favorites in the 1936–37 season, the club was haunted by injuries all year and in the end only finished second, to the Kehler FV once more. The season after, the club fulfilled its potential, took out the Bezirksliga championship and gained promotion to the Gauliga Baden.

The club had a flying start to the new Gauliga season but then injuries once more ruined its season and a last place finish was all it could archive. Relegation could only be avoided due to the outbreak of the Second World War. The Gauliga Baden was split into four regional groups in the 1939–40 season and play was hardly representative with a large number of players having to join the Wehrmacht and being unavailable for most league games.

The OFV continued its existence in the second-tier Bezirksliga Freiburg from 1940, playing local and military sides in ever increasing difficulties, caused by the war. By late 1944, the club was unable to continue regular football games.

=== 1945 to 1963 ===
The town of Offenburg became part of the French occupation zone after the Second World War and this meant, like for the whole Südbaden region, a separation from the northern half of the state, which was part of the US zone.

The players of the former Offenburger FV slowly reformed its football team in 1945. The club itself was reformed in March 1946 but, due to an order issued by the French authorities in the previous month, could not play under its old name. Instead, the Offenburger Spiel Vereinigung was formed in June 1945 and took part in the southern group of the tier-one Oberliga Südwest. Players from the former local rival, Kehler FV, joined the Offenburg side because the town of Kehl was under direct French administration and had to be evacuated.

The 1947–48 season became the to-date most successful one for the club, a second place in its group, one point behind Fortuna Rastatt, who qualified to play the 1. FC Kaiserslautern for the south western championship. Offenburg still qualified to play the TuS Neuendorf for a place in the German championship but lost both games. The club was led once more by its manager Fritz Kläger, who had just returned from the war.

The following season saw a loss of many of the club's best players and its coach. Not surprisingly, the team came second-last in 1948–49 and only the upsizing of the number of teams in the league from 12 to 16 saved the club from relegation. The year 1949 also saw the old grandstand burning down, which also caused the loss of many documents related to the early years of the club.

The 1949–50 season, the last for the club as a first division outfit, saw it struggle again. Only when the former Polish and German international Ernst Willimowski joined the side did things improve but again only an eleventh-place finish was possible. The league system in the south of Baden was heavily reorganised after this season and all clubs now fell under the Southern German football association again. The southern group of the Oberliga Südwest was disbanded, its top teams either entered the tier-one Oberliga Süd or tier-two 2. Oberliga Süd. For the majority of clubs however, it meant a drop to the tier-three Amateurliga Südbaden, including the Offenburger FV, which was now permitted to return to its old name since May 1950. The SC 1929 Offenburg became independent again in October 1950.

The OFV was to remain in the Amateurliga Südbaden for the remainder of the league's existence until 1978 and then continued on in the Oberliga Baden-Württemberg until its relegation in 1991, making it 41 seasons as a third division outfit.

In 1952, the club won its first of nine titles in the Amateurliga. While the team would have earned the right to compete in the qualification round to the 2. Oberliga, the club decided the financial strain was too much and declined. The next season, the club won its league again and this time competed in the promotion round. However, it was not clear whether it would accept promotion if achieved and this may have negatively influenced the players, a fourth-place finish being the result. The club remained in the Amateurliga.

A third title in a row was won in 1954 but in the promotion round the OFV failed again, with another fourth-place finish. The 1954–55 season saw a rebuilding of the team with a sixth-place finish and the retirement of long-time manager Fritz Kläger. In 1957, the club stood on top again, equal on points to the FC Konstanz, but lost the decider for the championship 0–3.

Another championship followed in 1957–58, with another repeat of the club's failure in the promotion round. The season after, the club was without debt for the first time in a decade but could only finish fourth in the Amateurliga. The fifth title followed in 1960 and promotion was now only narrowly missed by a point, the closest the club had come to it so far.

In 1960–61 the OFV became the first team to win the Südbaden cup and league in the same year. The promotion round to the 2. Oberliga was again a failure but the club was almost offered a second chance when the DFB initially refused a licence to the better placed teams and the OFV had the opportunity to win promotion in a decider played with the second placed team from the other group, which it lost. The club also took part in the DFB-Pokal, the German Cup, where it lost 0–4 to VfB Stuttgart.

The 1961–62 season was the worst for the club in the Amateurliga so far, only finishing ninth. The following season saw a return to better times with a second place in the league. At the end of the 1962–63 season, German football was reorganised and the Bundesliga was established. Below it, in the south of Germany, the Regionalliga Süd replaced the 2. Oberliga. For the OFV, this meant no change, it remained in the Amateurliga.

=== 1963 to 1991 ===
The new era began for the club with top-four finishes but no championship; only in 1967 did the club win another Südbaden title. The club came close to gaining promotion to the Regionalliga, too, having to play a decider in Pforzheim against the TSG Backnang, which the team lost 0–1 in front of 10,000 spectators.

The club continued to archive top-four finishes in the next three seasons but dropped to eleventh place in 1971, something of a disgrace for the otherwise so successful amateur side. The following two seasons, the club was back in the top five again. Another championship was won in 1974, but it did not allow the OFV to play for promotion; due to changes in the league system, no amateur team could be promoted that season.

The club won its last Amateurliga Südbaden title in 1975; it was also the last time to date for the OFV to have won a third division title. It was also the hardest earned title for the club, having to play in a league with all the great names of Südbaden football, SC Freiburg, FC Rastatt 04, FC 08 Villingen, FC Konstanz and Freiburger FC, which finished in this order behind the OFV. The club also scored 114 goals that season. In the promotion round, now to the 2. Bundesliga Süd, the club finished second to the SSV Reutlingen and missed out on promotion again.

With the decision in autumn 1976, to establish the Amateur Oberliga Baden-Württemberg as the united third division for the state of Baden-Württemberg from 1978, the club began aiming for this goal, which required a top-five finish in the 1977–78 season. The OFV missed this goal by a point and finished in sixth place, but the club was fortunate, because the 1. FC Nürnberg won promotion to the Bundesliga, which meant an additional place in the 2. Bundesliga Süd became available, which was taken up by the SC Freiburg. In turn, the Offenburger FV received Freiburg's place in the Oberliga.

In the new Oberliga Baden-Württemberg, the team earned respectable results, finishing in the top six in the first four seasons. In 1982–83, the club finished runners-up to the SSV Ulm 1846 and qualified for the German amateur championship. The club had no success there but due to a regional Cup win were qualified to play in the first round of the DFB-Pokal, where they lost 1–4 to Werder Bremen.

With Ulm promoted, the OFV was seen as the favorite for the 1983–84 season, but finished second to the Freiburger FC in the end. This earned them another shot at the amateur championship, which they finally won at home on 16 June 1984, when SC Eintracht Hamm was defeated 4–1 in front of 10,000 spectators. The season after, the club came only fourth and in 1985–86, it even had to struggle against relegation, finishing tenth in the end.

The OFV finished second in the Oberliga for a third time in 1987, this time being only one point behind the SV Sandhausen. In the amateur championship, the club got knocked out in the semi-finals. It was somewhat of an end to an era; from then on, the club declined.

In the 1987–88 season, Offenburg hosted Borussia Dortmund in a first-round cup match and archived an amazing three-all draw, coming from behind three times. In the rematch in Dortmund, the club lost 0–5, not unexpectedly. The league season 1987–88 was a disappointment, however, with the club having to successfully fight of relegation. The two seasons after, it managed to finish in the top six once more.

The 1990–91 season was the expected hard ride, with many of the best players having left the club and no real adequate replacement having been found. The club struggled all season in the relegation zone, never left it and found itself dropping down to the Verbandsliga Südbaden at the end of it. It was the first relegation in the post-Second World War era and 42 years as a third division outfit came to an end.

=== 1991 to current ===
The club struggled to establish itself in the fourth division, archiving moderate ninth places in its first two seasons. The decline was partly to blame on a lack of interest on the side of the spectators and financial difficulties on the side of the club. The club fell deeper into debt, was close to folding at some stage and instead of achieving the hoped for return to the Oberliga, it fell a level lower to the Landesliga, in 1994.

The Offenburger FV spent seven seasons in the Landesliga, a league it found difficult to get promoted from, despite good results. In 1996, the OFV finished second and failed in the promotion relegation once more. However, the club's troubles continued, having to withdraw its reserve team from competition for the first time, due to a lack of players.

The year 1997 became something of a turning point for the struggling club. In a general meeting of the Offenburger FV on 15 August 1997, a one-off payment from every club member was approved, to pay off the debt, which was achieved by 1999. The 1997–98 team saw itself mostly made up from local players who came up through the youth ranks. The club continued to aim for promotion but failed, largely due to the fact that it had no reserve team to back up the first eleven when players were injured. In 2001, another Landesliga runners-up finish saw the club for once succeeding in promotion matches and it won its first post-Second World War promotion.

In the next seven Verbandsliga seasons, the club finished in the top six every year, coming second in 2004 and 2007 but failing in the promotion round both years. It is doubtful, however, whether the club would have been ready for the Oberliga, as it continued to struggle financially.

The 2007–08 season did finally bring back long missing success to the club, the first Südbaden league title since 1975 and promotion to the Oberliga, which now was only the fifth division in German football. OFV had a disappointing season there, finishing last and being relegated back to the Verbandsliga.

After two seasons at this level, OFV returned to the Oberliga in 2011, where it lasted until 2013, when the club was relegated back to the Verbandsliga Südbaden again. Another Verbandsliga title in 2015–16 took the club back to the Oberliga.

== International players ==
The following former internationals have played for the OFV in the later stages of their career:

- Ernst Willimowski, former German and Polish international, played for the OFV 1950 to 1952
- Kazimierz Kmiecik, former Polish international, played for the OFV in 1988–89

== Former managers ==
- Hans Cieslarczyk (1979–1980)
- Antun Rudinski (1990–1991)
- Octavian Popescu (1991)
- Jürgen Hartmann (2006–2007)

== Reserve team ==
The Offenburger FV II, in its better days, spent six seasons in the Verbandsliga Südbaden, which it finally got relegated from in 1990. After a time, were the club had no reserve side at all, the team has returned to some success, winning the Kreisliga B Offenburg, Staffel IV in 2008 and gaining promotion to the Kreisliga A Offenburg, Staffel Nord.

== Youth team ==
The Under-19 side of the club (German: A-Jugend) competet in the Under 19 Bundesliga South-Southwest in 2007–08, having gained promotion from the Oberliga the year before. The team finished thirteen out of fourteen teams and was relegated, Nevertheless, it is a strong performance when one considers that almost all other sides at this level are youth teams of professional clubs, like VfB Stuttgart and Bayern Munich.

== Honours ==
The club's honours:

=== League ===
- German amateur football championship
  - Champions: 1984
- Bezirksklasse Baden (II)
  - Champions: (4) 1921, 1934, 1935, 1938
- Kreisliga Südbaden (II)
  - Champions: (4) 1925, 1927, 1931, 1932
- Oberliga Baden-Württemberg (III)
  - Runners-up: (3) 1983, 1984, 1987
- Amateurliga Südbaden (III)
  - Champions: (9) 1952, 1953, 1954, 1958, 1960, 1961, 1967, 1974, 1975
  - Runners-up: (4) 1956, 1957, 1963, 1968
- Verbandsliga Südbaden (V)
  - Champions: (3) 2008, 2011, 2016
  - Runners-up: (3) 2004, 2007, 2010

=== Cup ===
- South Baden Cup
  - Winners: (5) 1961, 1967, 1982, 1987, 2012
  - Runners-up: (8) 1948, 1959, 1972, 1978, 1981, 1985, 1988, 2009

== Recent managers ==
Recent managers of the club:

Manager	Start	Finish
Jürgen Hartmann	1 July 2006	30 June 2007
Arnold Brunner	1 July 2007	Present

== Recent seasons ==
The recent season-by-season performance of the club:

Season	Division	Tier	Position
1999–2000	Landesliga Südbaden	VI	5th
2000–01	Landesliga Südbaden	VI	2nd ↑
2001–02	Verbandsliga Südbaden	V	6th
2002–03	Verbandsliga Südbaden	V	4th
2003–04	Verbandsliga Südbaden	V	2nd
2004–05	Verbandsliga Südbaden	V	4th
2005–06	Verbandsliga Südbaden	V	3rd
2006–07	Verbandsliga Südbaden	V	2nd
2007–08	Verbandsliga Südbaden	V	1st ↑
2008–09	Oberliga Baden-Württemberg	V	18th ↓
2009–10	Verbandsliga Südbaden	VI	2nd
2010–11	Verbandsliga Südbaden	VI	1st ↑
2011–12	Oberliga Baden-Württemberg	V	13th
2012–13	Oberliga Baden-Württemberg	V	16th ↓
2013–14	Verbandsliga Südbaden	VI	5th
2014–15	Verbandsliga Südbaden	VI	8th
2015–16	Verbandsliga Südbaden	VI	1st ↑
2016–17	Oberliga Baden-Württemberg	V	

- With the introduction of the Regionalligas in 1994 and the 3. Liga in 2008 as the new third tier, below the 2. Bundesliga, all leagues below dropped one tier.

↑ Promoted	↓ Relegated

== Stadium ==
The club's ground, the Karl-Heitz-Stadion, is a pure football stadium, something of a rarity for clubs at this level who usually play in multi-functional stadiums. The stadium was built in 1957–58 and modernised in 2001–02. It holds 15,000 spectators.
