= 2022–23 Verbandspokal =

Tournament details
- Country: Germany
- Teams: 44

The 2022–23 Verbandspokal (English: 2022–23 Association Cup) consisted of twenty-one regional cup competitions, the Verbandspokale, the qualifying competition for the 2023–24 DFB-Pokal, the German Cup.

All clubs from the 3. Liga and below could enter the regional Verbandspokale, subject to the rules and regulations of each region. Clubs from the Bundesliga and 2. Bundesliga do not enter but were instead directly qualified for the first round of the DFB-Pokal. Reserve teams were not permitted to take part in the DFB-Pokal or the Verbandspokale. The precise rules of each regional Verbandspokal were laid down by the regional football association organising it.

All twenty-one winners qualified for the first round of the German Cup in the following season. Three additional clubs also qualified for the first round of the German Cup, these being from the three largest state associations, Bavaria, Westphalia and Lower Saxony. The Lower Saxony Cup was split into two paths, one for teams from the 3. Liga and the Regionalliga Nord and one for the teams from lower leagues. The winners of both paths qualified for the DFB-Pokal. In Bavaria the best-placed non-reserve Regionalliga Bayern team qualified for the DFB-Pokal while in Westphalia the spot alternated between the Oberliga Westfalen champion and best-placed Westphalian team from the Regionalliga West. This year, the Regionalliga West champion qualified.

The finals of the Verbandspokal competitions was played on the Amateurs' Final Day (German: Finaltag der Amateure), on 3 June 2023.

== Competitions ==
The finals of the 2022–23 Verbandspokal competitions (winners listed in bold):

Cup	Date	Location	Team 1	Result	Team 2	Report
Baden Cup (2022–23 season)	3 June 2023	Nöttingen	1. CfR Pforzheim	0–2	**Astoria Walldorf**	Report
Bavarian Cup (Note: As one of the three largest regional associations, Bavaria gets an additional DFB-Pokal berth, which goes to the best non-reserve team of the Regionalliga Bayern.) (2022–23 season)	3 June 2023	Illertissen	**FV Illertissen**	2–2 (5–3 p)	FC Ingolstadt	Report
Berlin Cup (2022–23 season)	3 June 2023	Berlin	**Makkabi Berlin**	3–1 (a.e.t.)	Sparta Lichtenberg	Report
Brandenburg Cup (2022–23 season)	3 June 2023	Cottbus	**Energie Cottbus**	4–1	FSV Luckenwalde	Report
Bremen Cup (2022–23 season)	3 June 2023	Bremen	**FC Oberneuland**	0–0 (4–1 p)	SG Aumund-Vegesack	Report
Hamburg Cup (2022–23 season)	3 June 2023	Hamburg	TSV Sasel	0–1	**Teutonia Ottensen**	Report
Hessian Cup (2022–23 season)	3 June 2023	Frankfurt	**FSV Frankfurt**	2–2 (5–3 p)	TSV Steinbach Haiger	Report
Lower Rhine Cup (2022–23 season)	3 June 2023	Essen	**Rot-Weiss Essen**	2–0	Rot-Weiß Oberhausen	Report
Lower Saxony Cup (Note: As one of the three largest regional associations, Lower Saxony gets an additional DFB-Pokal berth, which goes to the winner of the second cup path.) (2022–23 season (3. Liga / Regionalliga)) (2022–23 season (amateurs))	3 June 2023	Delmenhorst	Atlas Delmenhorst	1–2	**VfL Osnabrück**	Report
Lower Saxony Cup (2022–23 season (3. Liga / Regionalliga)) (2022–23 season (amateurs))	29 May 2023	Bersenbrück	**TuS Bersenbrück**	3–0	SC Spelle-Venhaus	Report
Mecklenburg-Vorpommern Cup (2022–23 season)	3 June 2023	Greifswald	Einheit Ueckermünde	2–5	**Rostocker FC**	Report
Middle Rhine Cup (2022–23 season)	3 June 2023	Cologne	1. FC Düren	0–2	**Viktoria Köln**	Report
Rhineland Cup (2022–23 season)	3 June 2023	Koblenz	TuS Immendorf	0–1	**Rot-Weiß Koblenz**	Report
Saarland Cup (2022–23 season)	3 June 2023	Saarbrücken	1. FC Saarbrücken	2–3	**SV Elversberg**	Report
Saxony Cup (2022–23 season)	3 June 2023	Leipzig	**Lokomotive Leipzig**	3–0	Chemnitzer FC	Report
Saxony-Anhalt Cup (2022–23 season)	3 June 2023	Halberstadt	Einheit Wernigerode	0–1	**Hallescher FC**	Report
Schleswig-Holstein Cup (2022–23 season)	3 June 2023	Flensburg	Weiche Flensburg	1–2	**VfB Lübeck**	Report
South Baden Cup (2022–23 season)	3 June 2023	Emmendingen	FC 08 Villingen	0–3	**SV Oberachern**	Report
Southwestern Cup (2022–23 season)	3 June 2023	Pirmasens	Wormatia Worms	2–2 (a.e.t.) (4–5 p)	**Schott Mainz**	Report
Thuringian Cup (2022–23 season)	3 June 2023	Jena	**Carl Zeiss Jena**	4–2	Wacker Nordhausen	Report
Westphalian Cup (Note: As one of the three largest regional associations, Westphalia gets an additional DFB-Pokal berth, which will alternate between the Oberliga Westfalen champion and best-placed Westphalian team from the Regionalliga West. This year, the Regionalliga West champion qualifies.) (2022–23 season)	3 June 2023	Hamm	SpVgg Erkenschwick	0–0 (3–4 p)	**FC Gütersloh**	Report
Württemberg Cup (2022–23 season)	3 June 2023	Stuttgart	Stuttgarter Kickers	1–1 (a.e.t.) (4–5 p)	**TSG Balingen**	Report
