= Verbandsliga Südbaden =

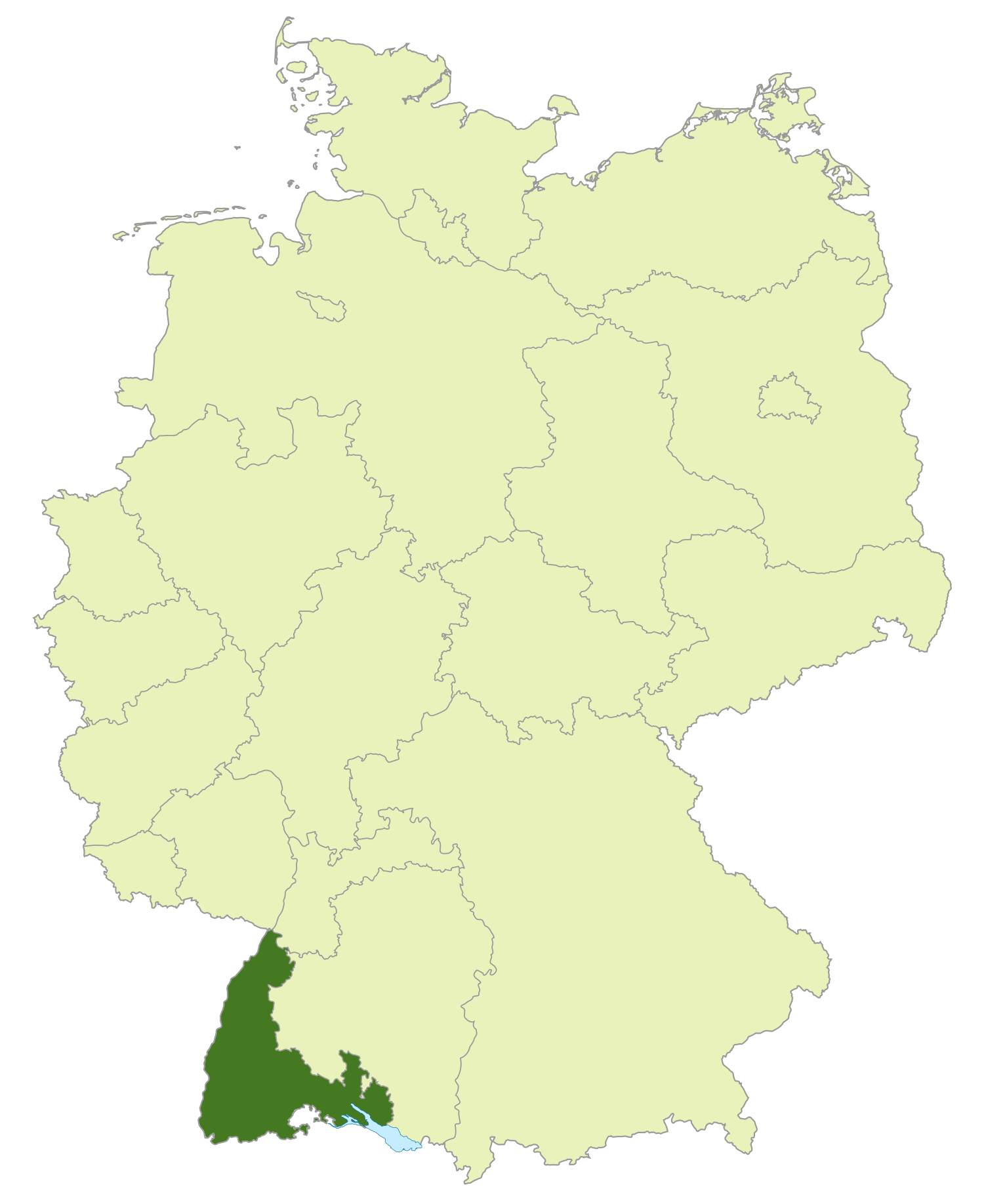
- Organising body: South Badenese Football Association
- Founded: 1945
- Country: Germany
- State: Baden-Württemberg
- Region: Baden
- Number of clubs: 17
- Level on pyramid: Level 6
- Promotion to: Oberliga Baden-Württemberg
- Relegation to: Landesliga Südbaden (3 divisions)
- Domestic cup: South Baden Cup
- Current champions: Offenburger FV (2021–22)

The Verbandsliga Südbaden is a German amateur football division administered by the South Badenese Football Association, one of the 21 German state football associations. Being the top flight of the South Baden state association, the Verbandsliga is currently a level 6 division of the German football league system.

== Overview ==
The Verbandsliga Südbaden was formed in 1945, then called Landesliga Südbaden, in the southern half of the then state of Baden, which is now the western half of the German state of Baden-Württemberg. It was originally a feeder league to the Oberliga Südwest (southern section) and therefore the second tier of the football league system in the southwest of Germany until 1950, when the clubs from Südbaden left the southwest league system and returned to the southern system where they geographically belong. From 1950 until the establishment of the Oberliga Baden-Württemberg in 1978, it was the third tier of the football league system.

The separation of North Baden and South Baden results from the outcome of the 2nd World War when the state was split into two separate occupation zones. The north was in the US zone and the south in the French zone. For this reason the clubs from the south of Baden found themselves thrown in with the Oberliga Südwest (northern group), as those also were in the French zone.

The league was established in 1945 with nine teams in the western and eight teams in the eastern group. Four of those clubs gained entry into the new Oberliga Südwest (southern group) for the 1946–47 season. The year after the league was split into three groups, from 1947 it was staged in one single group and adopted the name Amateurliga Südbaden. The twelve founding members of the league were:

- ASV Villingen (FC Villingen)
- Lahrer FV
- SC Baden-Baden
- VfR Stockach
- SpVgg Rheinfelden (FC Rheinfelden)
- SpVgg Ottenau (SV Ottenau)
- SpVgg Emmendingen (FC Emmendingen)
- FC Gutach
- SV Schopfheim
- VfR Engen (FC Engen)
- FC Donaueschingen (FV Donaueschingen)
- FV Fahrnau

(Current name in brackets)

In the post-war days, clubs in the French zone were not allowed to operate under their pre-war names and had to adopt a new name. They gradually reverted to their old names as this rule was revoked.

In 1950, with the dissolution of the southern group of the Oberliga Südwest, its 16 clubs were integrated in the southern league system. Two went to the Oberliga Süd, three to the new 2nd Oberliga Süd, the other eleven went to the Amateurligen, six of those to Südbaden.

With the creation of the Amateurliga Schwarzwald-Bodensee in 1960, some clubs of the Südbaden leagues went across, three of those from the Amateurliga, being the FC Villingen, FC Konstanz and FC Radolfzell. Most of those returned in 1974.

With the introduction of the Bundesliga in 1963 the Amateurliga was placed below the new Regionalliga Süd but still retained its third-tier status. It continued to do so after the introduction of the 2nd Bundesliga Süd in 1974.

The winner of the Amateurliga Südbaden was not automatically promoted but rather had to take part in a promotion play-off to its league above. Usually, the champion would have to compete with the winners of the Amateurligas Nordbaden, Württemberg and (from 1961) Schwarzwald-Bodensee.

The Offenburger FV is the undisputed champion of this league, having won it a record 12 times. The club played 28 out of a possible 33 seasons in the Amateurliga Südbaden, interrupted only by a four-year spell in the Oberliga Südwest. From 1950 to 1978 it was always a member of the league and continued to be a third division side in the Oberliga Baden-Württemberg until 1991, making it 42 uninterrupted years, a German record. The FC Rastatt and SC Freiburg also belonged to the Amateurliga Südbaden for exactly the same time but with lesser success. Rastatt was relegated from the Oberliga in 1986 and Freiburg never fell below its 2nd Bundesliga status again.

In 1978, the league was renamed Verbandsliga Südbaden; at the same time the Oberliga Baden-Württemberg was formed as the new tier three league in the region. The top five teams out of the Verbandsliga went to the new Oberliga while the next ten clubs remained in this league. The bottom placed two teams were relegated to the Landesligas.

Admitted to the new Oberliga:

- FC Rastatt 04
- FC 08 Villingen
- SV Kuppenheim
- DJK Konstanz
- Offenburger FV

The winner of the Verbandsliga gains direct promotion to the Oberliga. The runners-up must play-off against the runners-up of Verbandsliga Baden. The winner of this play-off has to face the runners-up of the Verbandsliga Württemberg for the final Oberliga spot. In 1981 no extra spot and in 1994 three extra spots were available due to league format changes.

Feeder leagues to the Verbandsliga Südbaden

- Landesliga Südbaden 1
- Landesliga Südbaden 2
- Landesliga Südbaden 3

The term "Verbandsliga" translates as "Football Association League". There are 21 football associations within the German Football Association, South Baden being one of them.

== League champions ==
The league champions of the league:

=== Landesliga Südbaden ===
Season	Club
1945–46	**Fortuna Rastatt**; **VfL Konstanz**
1946–47	**Fortuna Freiburg**; **Eintracht Singen**; SpVgg Rheinfelden

=== Amateurliga/Verbandsliga Südbaden ===
Season	Club
1947–48	**ASV Villingen**
1948–49	**Lahrer FV**
1949–50	SC Baden-Baden
1950–51	FC 08 Villingen
1951–52	Offenburger FV
1952–53	Offenburger FV
1953–54	Offenburger FV
1954–55	FC Rastatt 04
1955–56	FC 08 Villingen
1956–57	FC Konstanz
1957–58	Offenburger FV
1958–59	**FC Singen 04**
1959–60	Offenburger FV
1960–61	Offenburger FV
1961–62	SC Baden-Baden
1962–63	FC Emmendingen
1963–64	**FC Emmendingen**
1964–65	SC Freiburg
1965–66	SV Oberkirch
1966–67	Offenburger FV
1967–68	SC Freiburg
1968–69	SV Waldkirch
1969–70	SV Waldkirch
1970–71	FC Emmendingen
1971–72	FC Rastatt 04

Season	Club
1972–73	SC Baden-Baden
1973–74	Offenburger FV
1974–75	Offenburger FV
1975–76	FC 08 Villingen
1976–77	**Freiburger FC**
1977–78	**SC Freiburg**
1978–79	**VfB Gaggenau**
1979–80	**SC Pfullendorf**
1980–81	**SV Kuppenheim**
1981–82	**SC Pfullendorf**
1982–83	**FC 08 Villingen**
1983–84	**SV Weil**
1984–85	**FC 08 Villingen**
1985–86	**VfB Gaggenau**
1986–87	**Spfr/DJK Freiburg**
1987–88	**SC Pfullendorf**
1988–89	**FC Emmendingen**
1989–90	**SC Pfullendorf**
1990–91	**Freiburger FC**
1991–92	**TuS Lörach-Stetten**
1992–93	**SV Linx**
1993–94	**FV Donaueschingen**
1994–95	**SC Pfullendorf**
1995–96	**Bahlinger SC**
1996–97	**FC Steinen**

Season	Club
1997–98	**SC Freiburg II**
1998–99	**FC Denzlingen**
1999–2000	**FC Teningen**
2000–01	**FC 08 Villingen**
2001–02	**FC Teningen**
2002–03	**SV Linx**
2003–04	**FC 08 Villingen**
2004–05	**SV Linx**
2005–06	**FC 08 Villingen**
2006–07	**SV Linx**
2007–08	**Offenburger FV**
2008–09	**FC Denzlingen**
2009–10	**SV Linx**
2010–11	**Offenburger FV**
2011–12	**FC Singen 04**
2012–13	**SV Oberachern**
2013–14	**Freiburger FC**
2014–15	**SV Oberachern**
2015–16	**Offenburger FV**
2016–17	**FC 08 Villingen**
2017–18	**SV Linx**
2018–19	**1. FC Rielasingen-Arlen**
2019–20	**FV Lörrach-Brombach**
2020–21	None
2021–22	**Offenburger FV**

Source: "Verbandsliga Südbaden". Das deutsche Fußball-Archiv.

- **bold** denotes club gained promotion.

=== Teams promoted to the Oberliga after play-offs ===
Since the 1978–79 seasons the runners-up have the opportunity to play-off for promotion. The following runners-up have succeeded in the promotion round:

- 1987: SV Linx
- 1994: FC 08 Villingen
- 1997: FC Singen 04
- 2005: FC Emmendingen
- 2006: Bahlinger SC
- 2008: Kehler FV
- 2019: Freiburger FC
- 2022: FC Holzhausen

== League placings ==
The complete list of clubs in the league and their league placings since 1994.

Club	S	95	96	97	98	99	00	01	02	03	04	05	06	07	08	09	10	11	12	13	14	15	16	17	18	19	20	21	22	23
SC Freiburg II	7	5	2	7	1	O	O	O	O	O	O	O	O	O	O	R	R	R	R	R	R	R	R	O	O	R	R	R	3L	3L
Bahlinger SC	19	2	1	O	O	O	O	O	O	O	O	O	2	O	O	O	O	O	O	O	O	O	R	O	O	O	R	R	R	R
SV Oberachern	5																9	4	2	1	O	1	O	O	O	O	O	O	O	O
FC 08 Villingen	21	O	6	5	5	7	7	1	O	O	1	O	1	O	O	O	O	O	O	O	O	O	O	1	O	O	O	O	O	O
SV Linx	28	O	O	O	7	2	2	3	2	1	O	1	O	1	O	2	1	O	6	3	2	3	3	6	1	O	O	O	O	x
1. FC Rielasingen-Arlen	5																					6	2	5	5	1	O	O	O	O
Freiburger FC	18	3	3	9	6	14		10	10	6	7	5	11	6	4	13				8	1	O	O	2	2	2	O	O	O	O
FV Lörrach-Brombach	3																								4	10	1	O	O	x
Offenburger FV	20								6	4	2	4	3	2	1	O	2	1	O	O	5	8	1	O	8	3	2	3	1	O
FC Denzlingen	24	4	8	3	4	1	O	O	O	7	16		6	4	6	1	O	8	9	7	11	15		3	11	13	8	9	2	x
SV Waldkirch	11																	12	10	12	8	12	8	17		14	11	10	3	x
SV Kuppenheim	27	14		15		8	4	11	15						12	14					12	11	4	10	13	6	6	11	4	x
SC Lahr	7																						6	9	9	8	5	2	5	x
SC Pfullendorf	11	1	O	O	O	R	R	R	O	R	R	R	R	R	R	R	R	R	R	R	R	O	O	16		7	7	1	6	x
SF Elzach-Yach	4															10	15											12	7	x
SV Bühlertal	7																					13	10	15			10	5	8	x
FC Auggen	7																						5	4	10	4	12	6	9	x
FC Teningen	15	9	7	12	3	4	1	O	1	O	3	10	5	13													15	13	10	x
FC 08 Villingen II	2																											17	11	x
Kehler FV	15								13		17			5	2	O	O	O	O	O	O	O	O	7	6	9	3	4	12	x
FC Radolfzell	16																	14			10	2	13		3	5	9	8	13	
SV Weil	27	10	15									3	12	10	7	11	7	2	12	6	13						4	7	14	
DJK Donaueschingen	3																										14	15	15	
SC Durbachtal	2																											14	16	
SV Endingen	21	15		13	15			9	16							12	14		4	5	3	10	7	11	7	11	13	16	17	
1. SV Mörsch	5																		14					13	12	12	16			
FSV Rot-Weiß Stegen	1																									15				
TuS Oppenau	1																									16				
FC Bad Dürrheim	9										12	4	18						15		4	5	9	8	14					
SV Stadelhofen	16					11	8	13					4	11	8	9	3	7	5	11	16			12	15					
FC Singen 04	15	8	9	2	O	O	O	15		14							8	3	1	O	6	4	16		16					x
SC Hofstetten	2																	15							17					x
FC Neustadt	9					10	11	5	7	15														14	18					
SV Solvay Freiburg	5																			10	9	7	11	18						
FC Bötzingen	14								11	16		13		9	13	6	4	6	7	4	7	9	12							
SpVgg Frickingen	2																			13			14							
VfB Bühl	10											7	9	8	9	3	5	10	8	15			15							
FC St. Georgen	1																					14								
SC Offenburg	1																					16								
VfR Hausen	9												8	12	11	5	10	5	3	2	14									
SC Wyhl	1																				15									
FV Schutterwald	5																11	9	11	9	17									
FV Lahr	1																			14										
FV Donaueschingen	20	O	4	6	2	5	6	7	12	11	15			15				11	13	16										
FC Emmendingen	24	6	5	8	9	6	3	2	3	2	4	2	O	O	5	14			16											
SC Pfullendorf II	10						9	6	14			6	10	3	3	8	6	13												
SV Kirchzarten	2																12	16												
FC Rastatt 04	18	11	16					8	5	3	5	14			10	4	13													
FC Konstanz	14								4	10	6	9	7	14		7	16													
SV Oberkirch	7		10	10	13	16										15														
DJK Villingen	2							14							14															
FV Gamshurst	2													7	15															
FC Wehr 1912	3										8	15			16															
FC Wollmatingen	2												13	16																
FC Steinen-Höllstein	16	12	12	1	O	O	10	12	9	5	10	12	15																	
SV Rust	4									8	9	11	16																	
SV Laufenburg	8	7	14				14			12	11	16																		
FV Herbolzheim	3		13							9	13																			
SV Au am Rhein	1										14																			
SV Kirchzarten	16	16				3	5	4	8	13																				
VfB Gaggenau	12	O	O	4	8	9	12	16																						
FC Welschingen-Binningen	1						13																							
SV Oberweiler	3						15																							
SV Hausach	11				11	12	16																							
Lahrer SV	2				10	13																								
SC Gottmadingen	2				12	15																								
SV Kappel	2			11	14																									
Bahlinger SC II	1				16																									x
SV Litzelstetten	1			14																										
Rot-Weiß Salem	3		11	16																										
TuS Blumberg	1		17																											
SC Friesenheim	5	13																												
FV Rot-Weiß Elchesheim	0+																													x

=== Key ===
Symbol	Key
B	Bundesliga
2B	2. Bundesliga
3L	3. Liga
R	Regionalliga Süd (1994–2012) Regionalliga Südwest (2012–present)
O	Oberliga Baden-Württemberg
1	League champions
Place	League
Blank	Played at a league level below this league

- S = No of seasons in league (as of 2022–23)
