= 2021–22 Verbandspokal =

Tournament details
- Country: Germany
- Teams: 44

The 2021–22 Verbandspokal (English: 2021–22 Association Cup) consisted of twenty-one regional cup competitions, the Verbandspokale, the qualifying competition for the 2022–23 DFB-Pokal, the German Cup.

All clubs from the 3. Liga and below could enter the regional Verbandspokale, subject to the rules and regulations of each region. Clubs from the Bundesliga and 2. Bundesliga could not enter but were instead directly qualified for the first round of the DFB-Pokal. Reserve teams were not permitted to take part in the DFB-Pokal or the Verbandspokale. The precise rules of each regional Verbandspokal are laid down by the regional football association organising it.

All twenty-one winners qualified for the first round of the German Cup in the following season. Three additional clubs also qualified for the first round of the German Cup, these being from the three largest state associations, Bavaria, Westphalia and Lower Saxony. The Lower Saxony Cup was split into two paths, one for teams from the 3. Liga and the Regionalliga Nord and one for the teams from lower leagues. The winners of both paths qualified for the DFB-Pokal. In Bavaria the best-placed non-reserve Regionalliga Bayern team qualified for the DFB-Pokal while in Westphalia the best-placed non-reserve Oberliga Westfalen team qualified.

The finals of the Verbandspokal competitions were played on the Amateurs' Final Day (German: Finaltag der Amateure), on 21 May 2022.

== Competitions ==
The finals of the 2021–22 Verbandspokal competitions (winners listed in bold):

Cup	Date	Location	Team 1	Result	Team 2	Report
Baden Cup (2021–22 season)	21 May 2022	Mannheim	**Waldhof Mannheim**	3–0	Türkspor Mannheim	Report
Bavarian Cup (Note: As one of the three largest regional associations, Bavaria gets an additional DFB-Pokal berth, which goes to the best non-reserve team of the Regionalliga Bayern.) (2021–22 season)	21 May 2022	Illertissen	**FV Illertissen**	1–1 (4–3 p)	TSV Aubstadt	Report
Berlin Cup (2021–22 season)	21 May 2022	Berlin	VSG Altglienicke	1–2	**Viktoria Berlin**	Report
Brandenburg Cup (2021–22 season)	21 May 2022	Luckenwalde	VfB Krieschow	0–2	**Energie Cottbus**	Report
Bremen Cup (2021–22 season)	21 May 2022	Bremen	**Bremer SV**	1–0	Leher TS	Report
Hamburg Cup (2021–22 season)	21 May 2022	Hamburg	Altona 93	1–2	**Teutonia Ottensen**	Report
Hessian Cup (2021–22 season)	21 May 2022	Wiesbaden	TSV Steinbach Haiger	0–1	**Kickers Offenbach**	Report
Lower Rhine Cup (2021–22 season)	21 May 2022	Duisburg	**SV Straelen**	1–0	Wuppertaler SV	Report
Lower Saxony Cup (Note: As one of the three largest regional associations, Lower Saxony gets an additional DFB-Pokal berth, which goes to the winner of the second cup path.) (2021–22 season (3. Liga / Regionalliga)) (2021–22 season (amateurs))	18 May 2022	Rehden	**Schwarz-Weiß Rehden**	1–0	SV Meppen	Report
Lower Saxony Cup (2021–22 season (3. Liga / Regionalliga)) (2021–22 season (amateurs))	21 May 2022	Hanover	Heeslinger SC	0–0 (5–6 p)	**Blau-Weiß Lohne**	Report
Mecklenburg-Vorpommern Cup (2021–22 season)	21 May 2022	Neustrelitz	**TSG Neustrelitz**	1–1 (a.e.t.) (6–5 p)	Greifswalder FC	Report
Middle Rhine Cup (2021–22 season)	21 May 2022	Cologne	Fortuna Köln	0–2	**Viktoria Köln**	Report
Rhineland Cup (2021–22 season)	21 May 2022	Koblenz	**FV Engers**	1–0	FC Karbach	Report
Saarland Cup (2021–22 season)	21 May 2022	Saarbrücken	FC 08 Homburg	1–2 (a.e.t.)	**SV Elversberg**	Report
Saxony Cup (2021–22 season)	21 May 2022	Chemnitz	**Chemnitzer FC**	2–1	Chemie Leipzig	Report
Saxony-Anhalt Cup (Note: On 24 April 2021, the 2020–21 edition of the Saxony-Anhalt Cup was paused and was continued in 2021–22 starting with the round of 16.) (2021–22 season)	21 May 2022	Halberstadt	Einheit Wernigerode	0–5	**1. FC Magdeburg**	Report
Schleswig-Holstein Cup (2021–22 season)	21 May 2022	Flensburg	TSB Flensburg	2–2 (a.e.t.) (7–8 p)	**VfB Lübeck**	Report
South Baden Cup (2021–22 season)	21 May 2022	Lahr	DJK Donaueschingen	0–2	**SV Oberachern**	Report
Southwestern Cup (2021–22 season)	21 May 2022	Weingarten	**Schott Mainz**	3–0	FK Pirmasens	Report
Thuringian Cup (2021–22 season)	21 May 2022	Gera	**Carl Zeiss Jena**	1–0	ZFC Meuselwitz	Report
Westphalian Cup (Note: As one of the three largest regional associations, Westphalia gets an additional DFB-Pokal berth, which goes to the best-placed non-reserve team of the Oberliga Westfalen.) (2021–22 season)	21 May 2022	Münster	Preußen Münster	1–1 (2–3 p)	**SV Rödinghausen**	Report
Württemberg Cup (2021–22 season)	21 May 2022	Stuttgart	**Stuttgarter Kickers**	0–0 (a.e.t.) (5–4 p)	SSV Ulm	Report
