= Fabio Moreno Fell =

Spanish footballer (born 2000)

Personal information
- Date of birth: 4 June 2000 (age 26)
- Place of birth: Las Palmas, Spain
- Height: 1.77 m (5 ft 10 in)
- Position: Forward

Team information
- Current team: 1. FSV Mainz 05 II
- Number: 10

Youth career
- SV Bechtolsheim
- FJFV Rheinhessen-Mitte
- –2016: TSV Gau-Odernheim
- 2016–2017: 1. FC Kaiserslautern
- 2017–2019: Wormatia Worms

Senior career*
Years	Team	Apps	(Gls)
2019–2020	FC Ingolstadt 04 II	11	(4)
2020–2021	1. FC Rielasingen-Arlen	16	(3)
2022–2025	TSV Gau-Odernheim	99	(113)
2025–2026	1. FSV Mainz 05	2	(0)
2025–	1. FSV Mainz 05 II	32	(13)
- * Club domestic league appearances and goals as of 24 September 2026

Fabio Moreno Fell (born 4 June 2000) is a Spanish professional footballer who plays as a forward for Regionalliga Südwest side 1. FSV Mainz 05 II.

== Career ==
Moreno Fell started his career with FC Ingolstadt 04 II in 2019, where he made eleven league appearances and scored four goals. During the summer of 2020, he signed for 1. FC Rielasingen-Arlen, where he made sixteen league appearances and scored three goals.

Following his stint there, he signed for TSV Gau-Odernheim in 2022, where he made 99 league appearances and scored 113 goals and helped the club achieve promotion from the sixth tier to the fifth tier. Ahead of the 2025–26 season, he signed for Bundesliga side 1. FSV Mainz 05.

== Personal life ==
Moreno Fell was born on 4 June 2000 to a Spanish father and German mother, and hold dual Spanish and German citizenship. Born in Las Palmas, Spain, he studied wholesaling.

== Career statistics ==
As of match played 26 June 2026

Appearances and goals by club, season and competition
Club	Season	League			National cup		Europe		Other		Total	
Club	Season	Division	Apps	Goals	Apps	Goals	Apps	Goals	Apps	Goals	Apps	Goals
FC Ingolstadt 04 II	2019–20	Bayernliga	—		—		—		1 (Note: Appearance in Bavarian Cup)	0	1	0
FC Ingolstadt 04 II	2020–21	Bayernliga	11	4	—		—		—		11	4
FC Ingolstadt 04 II	Total		11	4	—		—		1	0	12	4
1. FC Rielasingen-Arlen	2020–21	Oberliga Baden-Württemberg	8	3	1	0	—		1 (Note: Appearances in South Baden Cup)	0	10	3
1. FC Rielasingen-Arlen	2021–22	Oberliga Baden-Württemberg	8	0	0	0	—		1	1	9	1
1. FC Rielasingen-Arlen	Total		16	3	1	0	—		2	1	19	4
TSV Gau-Odernheim	2021–22	Verbandsliga Südwest	10	6	—		—		—		10	6
TSV Gau-Odernheim	2022–23	Verbandsliga Südwest	27	24	—		—		4 (Note: Appearances in Southwestern Cup)	4	31	28
TSV Gau-Odernheim	2023–24	Verbandsliga Südwest	30	30	—		—		1	2	31	32
TSV Gau-Odernheim	2024–25	Verbandsliga Südwest	32	53	—		—		3	1	35	54
TSV Gau-Odernheim	Total		99	113	0	0	—		8	7	107	120
Mainz 05	2025–26	Bundesliga	2	0	0	0	2 (Note: Appearances in UEFA Conference League)	0	—		4	0
Mainz 05 II (loan)	2025–26	Regionalliga Südwest	25	12	—		—		—		25	12
Career total			153	132	1	0	2	0	11	8	167	140
