= Dennis Bührer =

German footballer

Personal information
- Date of birth: 13 March 1983 (age 43)
- Place of birth: Emmendingen, West Germany
- Height: 1.76 m (5 ft 9 in)
- Position: Midfielder

Team information
- Current team: Bahlinger SC (manager)

Youth career
- 1987–1996: SV Ottoschwanden
- 1996–2002: SC Freiburg

Senior career*
Years	Team	Apps	(Gls)
2002–2008	SC Freiburg II	107	(7)
2004–2008	SC Freiburg	6	(0)
2008	Sportfreunde Siegen	15	(1)
2008–2010	Rot-Weiss Essen	63	(1)
2010–2011	Dynamo Dresden	23	(0)
2011–2019	Bahlinger SC	193	(15)
Total		407	(24)

International career
2003	Germany U20	2	(0)

Managerial career
- 2018–: Bahlinger SC
- * Club domestic league appearances and goals

Dennis Bührer (born 13 March 1983 in Emmendingen) is a German former professional footballer who played as a midfielder. He works as a manager for Bahlinger SC.
