= Georgios Pintidis =

German-Greek footballer

Personal information
- Date of birth: 28 April 2000 (age 26)
- Place of birth: Titisee-Neustadt, Germany
- Height: 1.85 m (6 ft 1 in)
- Position: Midfielder

Team information
- Current team: FC 08 Villingen
- Number: 6

Youth career
- –2015: SC Freiburg
- 2015–2017: Borussia Dortmund
- 2017–: FC Ingolstadt

Senior career*
Years	Team	Apps	(Gls)
2018–2020	FC Ingolstadt	4	(0)
2019–2020	FC Ingolstadt II	8	(0)
2020–2021	Sonnenhof Großaspach	7	(0)
2021–2022	FC Ingolstadt II	28	(1)
2022–	FC 08 Villingen	117	(5)
- * Club domestic league appearances and goals as of 27 September 2026

Georgios Pintidis (born 28 April 2000) is a German-Greek footballer who plays as a midfielder for FC 08 Villingen.

== Career ==
Pintidis made his professional debut for FC Ingolstadt in the 2. Bundesliga on 1 December 2018, starting in the match against Hamburger SV before being substituted out in the 83rd minute for Konstantin Kerschbaumer. The home match finished as a 1–2 loss for Ingolstadt.

In July 2020, he signed for Sonnenhof Großaspach on a two-year contract.
