= FC Singen 04 =

- Full name: Fussball Club Singen 1904 e.V.
- Founded: 5 August 1904
- Ground: Hohentwielstadion
- Capacity: 12,000
- Chairman: Hans-Joachim König
- Manager: Daniel Wieser
- League: Landesliga Südbaden Staffel 3 (VII)
- 2015–16: Verbandsliga Südbaden (VI), 16th (relegated)
Home colours	Away colours

The FC Singen 04 is a German association football club from the city of Singen, Baden-Württemberg. Established 4 August 1904. the club merged with Fußball-Club Radolfzell in 1908 to form FC Radolfzell-Singen. That union was ended on 10 March 1910 and in 1917 04 was joined by Sportclub Singen.

== History ==
FCS 04 won its first title in 1923, taking the championship in the Bezirksliga Ost, and in 1930 it won the Schwarzwaldliga, but could not find its way to the highest level of play in the Bezirksliga Württemberg-Baden. In 1933, German football was reorganized under the Third Reich into 16 top flight Gauligen and in 1939 FSC attempted to qualify for the Gauliga Baden but were beaten by VfR Achern (2–3, 5–3). The team also took part for the first time in national cup play in the Tschammerpokal tournament predecessor to today's DFB-Pokal (German Cup). From 1942 to 1945, during World War II, the club played as part of the combined wartime side Kriegspielgemeinschaft Singen/Gottmadingen alongside SpVgg Gottmadingen and Reichsbahn SV Singen.

Following the war occupying Allied authorities ordered the dissolution of most organizations in Germany, including sports and football clubs. New clubs soon emerged and FCS was reorganized as Sportverein Singen. In May 1946, the former memberships of several other Singen clubs, including Stadtturnverein Singen, Freie Turnerschaft Singen, and Roter Sport Singen, joined SV to play as Sportgemeinde Eintracht Singen. Both TSS and RSS were former worker's clubs that were banned by the regime in 1933 as politically undesirable.

Eintracht became part of the Oberliga Südbaden-Ost (I) for the 1945–46 season and the following year played in the Landesliga Südbaden-Ost. These circuits were not part of general German domestic competition, but were instead administered as part of a separate competition organized within the French zone of occupation. In 1947, the team returned to top flight competition in the French-controlled Oberliga Südwest-Süd and in 1948 captured the South Baden Cup. The following year the team reassumed its traditional identity as FCS 04.

The team played well and after a third-place result in 1950, FCS took part in qualification play for the Oberliga Süd (I) as teams from Südbaden returned to German competition: they beat Freiburger FC 3–0 and advanced alongside SSV Reutlingen to first division play. However, both clubs fared poorly there and were immediately relegated to the 2. Oberliga Süd where FCS spent 10 of the next 11 seasons. They spent the 1958–59 season in the Amateurliga Südbaden (III) and captured the German amateur football championship that year, defeating Arminia Hannover 3–2.

Following the introduction of the new first division Bundesliga in 1963, FCS became part of the Amateurliga Schwarzwald-Bodensee (III). They finished the 1963–64 campaign in second place and lost a Regionalliga (II) promotion playoff to FV Ebingen. The team remained competitive through most of the 1960s and on into the 1970s. In 1971 and 1972, they again took part in qualifying play for the Regionalliga Süd (II), but failed in both attempts losing to SV Waldhof 3–5 and 0–1. FCS played four more seasons in the Amateurliga Schwarzwald-Bodensee (III) and Amateurliga Südbaden (III) before being sent down after a 17th-place finish in 1976.

The club resurfaced in the Oberliga Baden-Württemberg in 1997 for a three-season stint before again slipping into lower-tier competition.

Since 1960, the clubs from the Black Forest-Lake Constance area were playing in their own league, the Amateurliga Schwarzwald-Bodensee and FC Singen 04 became part of this league. It managed to win it in 1971 and 1972 but failed both times in its aim to return to the second division. In 1971, it came third in the promotion round when only the winner moved up. In 1972, second on equal points with Waldhof Mannheim, it lost a decider 0–1.

In 1974, with the reorganisation of German football, Singen, alongside two other clubs, was moved to the Amateurliga Südbaden. It only lasted for two seasons there and was relegated to the tier-four 2. Amateurliga Südbaden-South in 1976.

In 1978, when the Oberliga Baden-Württemberg was formed as the new tier-three league for the whole state, Singen returned to the South Baden league on the strength of a 2nd Amateurliga championship, which was now renamed Verbandsliga Südbaden and was only the fourth tier of the league system.

The club belonged to the Verbandsliga until 1981, when it was relegated once more. What followed was a long spell in the lower amateur leagues until 1994, when it made a return to the Verbandsliga.

A second place in this league in 1997 meant promotion to the Oberliga and for three seasons, the club belonged to this league, a ninth place in its first season being the highlight. In the 1999–2000 edition of the DFB-Pokal, Singen managed to beat 2. Bundesliga side Rot-Weiß Oberhausen 3–2 in the first round before going out 1–3 to SpVgg Greuther Fürth in the second round.

From there, FCS 04 descended again and, after relegation from the Oberliga, went straight through to the Landesliga (VI) in 2001. Briefly returning to the Verbandsliga in 2002–03, the club since has been playing at Landesliga level.

=== Current ===
The club, with Singen being close to the Swiss border, enjoys close relations with its neighbouring country. In August 2008, it played a friendly against FC Aarau, then leader of the Swiss Super League.

On league level, it continued to play in the now tier-seven Landesliga Südbaden Staffel 3 in 2008–09, where team took out the championship and earned promotion. Three successful seasons in the Verbandsliga followed before the club earned promotion to the Oberliga Baden-Württemberg for a season before returning to the Verbandsliga Südbaden in 2013. A last-place finish in the Verbandsliga in 2015–16 took the club back to the Landesliga.

The club's fans have a long-standing friendship with the fans of FC Rastatt 04, another club from the south of Baden.

== Former players ==
Ernest Wilimowski, former Polish and German international, played the 1952–53 season with the club.

== Honours ==
The club's honours:

=== League ===
- German amateur football championship
  - Champions: 1959
- Amateurliga Südbaden (II-III)
  - Champions: 1947, 1959
- Amateurliga Schwarzwald-Bodensee (III)
  - Champions: 1971, 1972
- 2. Amateurliga Südbaden-South (IV)
  - Champions: 1978
- Verbandsliga Südbaden (VI)
  - Champions: 2012
- Landesliga Südbaden Staffel 3 (VII)
  - Champions: 2009

=== Cup ===
- South Baden Cup
  - Winners: 1948, 1968, 1971, 1997, 1999

== Recent seasons ==
The recent season-by-season performance of the club:

Season	Division	Tier	Position
1999–2000	Oberliga Baden-Württemberg	IV	16th ↓
2000–01	Verbandsliga Südbaden	V	15th ↓
2001–02	Landesliga Südbaden Staffel 3	VI	↑
2002–03	Verbandsliga Südbaden	V	14th ↓
2003–04	Landesliga Südbaden Staffel 3	VI	4th
2004–05	Landesliga Südbaden Staffel 3	VI	3rd
2005–06	Landesliga Südbaden Staffel 3	VI	3rd
2006–07	Landesliga Südbaden Staffel 3	VI	3rd
2007–08	Landesliga Südbaden Staffel 3	VI	2nd
2008–09	Landesliga Südbaden Staffel 3	VII	1st ↑
2009–10	Verbandsliga Südbaden	VI	8th
2010–11	Verbandsliga Südbaden	VI	3rd
2011–12	Verbandsliga Südbaden	VI	1st ↑
2012–13	Oberliga Baden-Württemberg	V	18th ↓
2013–14	Verbandsliga Südbaden	VI	6th
2014–15	Verbandsliga Südbaden	VI	4th
2015–16	Verbandsliga Südbaden	VI	16th ↓
2016–17	Landesliga Südbaden Staffel 3	VII	

- With the introduction of the Regionalligas in 1994 and the 3. Liga in 2008 as the new third tier, below the 2. Bundesliga, all leagues below dropped one tier.

↑ Promoted	↓ Relegated
