= Lars Hermel =

German footballer and manager

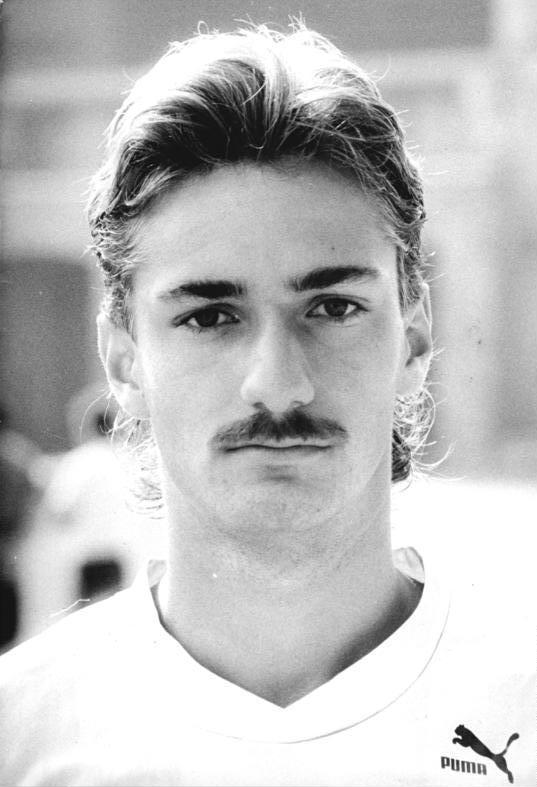
- Hermel in 1990

Personal information
- Date of birth: 28 September 1970 (age 56)
- Place of birth: Karl-Marx-Stadt, East Germany
- Height: 1.80 m (5 ft 11 in)
- Position: Defender

Team information
- Current team: SC Freiburg (youth)

Youth career
- 1. FC Karl-Marx-Stadt

Senior career*
Years	Team	Apps	(Gls)
1987–1990	1. FC Karl-Marx-Stadt	38	(3)
1990–1998	FSV Zwickau	123	(18)
1998–2006	SC Freiburg	130	(1)
2006–2007	Bahlinger SC		

Managerial career
- 2006–2007: Bahlinger SC (player-manager)
- 2009–: SC Freiburg (youth)
- * Club domestic league appearances and goals

Lars Hermel (born 28 September 1970) is a German former professional football defender who played for 1. FC Karl-Marx-Stadt, FSV Zwickau, SC Freiburg and Bahlinger SC. He works as youth coach for SC Freiburg.

He was a part of the East German squad at the 1989 FIFA World Youth Championship, playing all three matches.
