= SV Linx =

German football club

- Full name: Sportverein Linx 1949 e. V.
- Founded: 12 June 1949; 76 years ago
- Ground: Hans-Weber-Stadion
- Capacity: 3,000
- Chairman: Hans Weber
- Manager: Thomas Leberer
- League: Verbandsliga Südbaden (VI)
- 2023–24: 6th
- Website: https://svlinx.de/
Home colours	Away colours

SV Linx is a German association football club from the district of Linx in the city of Rheinau, Baden-Württemberg. It is part of a 340 member sports club that also has departments for gymnastics and volleyball.

== History ==
The club was founded on 12 June 1949 and first advanced out of local competition to regional play in the Landesliga in 1978, followed by a move up to the fourth-tier Verbandsliga Südbaden in 1981. As runners=up in 1987, the team rose to the Oberliga Baden-Württemberg (IV) but were immediately relegated after an 18th-place result. Linx remained a competitive side in the Verbandsliga Südbaden (V) through the late 1980s and into the early 1990s, earning a number of top three finishes until finally breaking through again to the Oberliga in 1993 where they played the next four seasons until being relegated in 1997. During this period the club made its only DFB-Pokal appearance after qualifying by way of a 1994 regional cup win. Linx was knocked out 2–1 in the first round by the Bundesliga side Schalke 04.

The club endured several frustrating seasons through the late 1990s and into the new millennium, with a number of second-place finishes until once more capturing the Verbandbsliga Südbaden (V) title in 2003. SV Linx have since become a yo-yo side, moving frequently between the fourth and fifth tiers. They returned to the Oberliga Baden-Württemberg (IV) for the 2007–08 season but a last place finish send them straight down again.

The club finished second in the Verbandsliga in 2008–09, which entitled it to take part in the promotion round to the Oberliga, where it lost both games to TSG 62/09 Weinheim and was knocked out. The following season, the club achieved its fourth promotion to the Oberliga since 2003, followed by its fourth relegation in 2011.

== Honours ==
=== League ===
- Verbandsliga Südbaden (V)
  - Champions: 1993, 2003, 2005, 2007, 2010, 2018
  - Runners-up: 1987, 1989, 1992, 1999, 2000, 2002, 2009, 2014

=== Cup ===
- South Baden Cup
  - Winners: 1994, 2018
  - Runners-up: 2012

== Players ==
Note: Flags indicate national team as defined under FIFA eligibility rules; some limited exceptions apply. Players may hold more than one non-FIFA nationality.

No.	Pos.	Nation	Player
17	MF	LAO	Roman Angot

== Recent managers ==
Recent managers of the club:

Manager	Start	Finish
Jacky Hartstreisel	1 July 2007	13 December 2007
Dieter Wendling	1 January 2008	31 August 2011
Sebastien Bischof	1 September 2011	Present

== Recent seasons ==
The recent season-by-season performance of the club:

Season	Division	Tier	Position
1999–2000	Verbandsliga Südbaden	V	2nd
2000–01	Verbandsliga Südbaden	V	3rd
2001–02	Verbandsliga Südbaden	V	2nd
2002–03	Verbandsliga Südbaden	V	1st ↑
2003–04	Oberliga Baden-Württemberg	IV	16th ↓
2004–05	Verbandsliga Südbaden	V	1st ↑
2005–06	Oberliga Baden-Württemberg	IV	18th ↓
2006–07	Verbandsliga Südbaden	V	1st ↑
2007–08	Oberliga Baden-Württemberg	IV	18th ↓
2008–09	Verbandsliga Südbaden	VI	2nd
2009–10	Verbandsliga Südbaden	VI	1st ↑
2010–11	Oberliga Baden-Württemberg	V	19th ↓
2011–12	Verbandsliga Südbaden	VI	6th
2012–13	Verbandsliga Südbaden	VI	3rd
2013–14	Verbandsliga Südbaden	VI	2nd
2014–15	Verbandsliga Südbaden	VI	3rd
2015–16	Verbandsliga Südbaden	VI	3rd
2016–17	Verbandsliga Südbaden	VI	6th
2017–18	Verbandsliga Südbaden	VI	1st ↑
2018–19	Oberliga Baden-Württemberg	V	12th

- With the introduction of the Regionalligas in 1994 and the 3. Liga in 2008 as the new third tier, below the 2. Bundesliga, all leagues below dropped one tier.

Key

↑ Promoted	↓ Relegated
