= Amateurliga Südbaden =

- Founded: 1945
- Folded: 1978
- Replaced by: Oberliga Baden-Württemberg (III); Verbandsliga Südbaden (IV)
- Country: Germany
- State: Baden-Württemberg
- Region: Baden
- Level on pyramid: Level 3
- Promotion to: Oberliga Südwest 1945–50; 2. Oberliga Süd 1950–63; Regionalliga Süd 1963–74; 2. Bundesliga Süd 1974–78
- Domestic cup: Südbaden Pokal
- Last champions: SC Freiburg (1977–78)

The Amateurliga Südbaden was the highest football league in the region of the Südbaden FA and the third tier of the German football league system from its inception in 1945 to the formation of the Oberliga Baden-Württemberg and the Verbandsliga Südbaden below it in 1978.

== Overview ==
The Amateurliga Südbaden was formed in 1945, then called Landesliga, in the southern half of the then state of Baden, which is now the western half of the German state of Baden-Württemberg. It was originally a feeder league to the Oberliga Südwest (southern section) and therefore the second tier of the football league system in the southwest of Germany until 1950, when the clubs from Südbaden left the southwest league system and returned to the southern system where they geographically belong. From 1950 until the establishment of the Oberliga Baden-Württemberg in 1978, it was the third tier of the football league system.

The separation of Nordbaden and Südbaden results from the outcome of the World War II when the state was split into two separate occupation zones. The north was in the US zone and the south in the French zone. For this reason the clubs from the south of Baden found themselves thrown in with the Oberliga Südwest (northern group), as those also were in the French zone.

The league was established in 1945 with nine teams in the western and eight teams in the eastern group. Four of those clubs gained entry into the new Oberliga Südwest (southern group) for the 1946–47 season. The year after the league was split into three groups, from 1947 it was staged in one single group and adopted the name Amateurliga. The twelve founder members of the league were:

- ASV Villingen (FC Villingen)
- Lahrer FV
- SC Baden-Baden
- VfR Stockach
- SpVgg Rheinfelden (FC Rheinfelden)
- SpVgg Ottenau (SV Ottenau)
- SpVgg Emmendingen (FC Emmendingen)
- FC Gutach
- SV Schopfheim
- VfR Engen (FC Engen)
- FC Donaueschingen (FV Donaueschingen)
- FV Fahrnau

(Current name in brackets)

In the post-war days, clubs in the French zone were not allowed to operate under their pre-war names and had to be adopt a new name. They gradually reverted to their old names as this rule was revoked.

In 1950, with the dissolution of the southern group of the Oberliga Südwest, its 16 clubs were integrated in the southern league system. Two went to the Oberliga Süd, three to the new 2. Oberliga Süd, the other eleven went to the Amateurligas, six of those to Südbaden.

With the creation of the Amateurliga Schwarzwald-Bodensee in 1960, some clubs of the Südbaden leagues went across, three of those from the Amateurliga, being the FC Villingen, FC Konstanz and FC Radolfzell. Most of those returned in 1974.

With the introduction of the Bundesliga in 1963 the Amateurliga was placed below the new Regionalliga Süd but still retained its third-tier status. It continued to do so after the introduction of the 2. Bundesliga Süd in 1974.

The winner of the Amateurliga Südbaden was not automatically promoted but rather had to take part in a promotion play-off to its league above. Usually, the champion would have to compete with the winners of the Amateurligas Nordbaden, Württemberg and (from 1961) Schwarzwald-Bodensee.

The Offenburger FV is the undisputed champion of this league, having won it nine times. The club played 29 out of a possible 33 in the league, interrupted only by a four-year spell in the Oberliga Südwest. From 1950 to 1978 it was always a member of the league and continued to be a third division side in the Oberliga Baden-Württemberg until 1991, making it 42 uninterrupted years, a German record. The FC Rastatt and SC Freiburg also belonged to the Amateurliga Südbaden for exactly the same time but with lesser success. Rastatt was relegated from the Oberliga in 1986 and Freiburg never fell below its 2nd Bundesliga status again.

== Disbanding of the Amateurliga Südbaden ==
In 1978, the Oberliga Baden-Württemberg was formed to allow direct promotion to the 2nd Bundesliga Süd for the Amateure champion of the state. SC Freiburg, the Amateurligas last champion, won promotion to the 2. Bundesliga, to this date (2007) the last team from Südbaden to do so. The teams placed two to six gained entry to the Oberliga, seven to sixteen went to the new Verbandsliga Südbaden, now the fourth tier of the football league system. The two last placed teams were relegated to the Landesliga.

Admitted to the new Oberliga:

- FC Rastatt 04
- FC 08 Villingen
- SV Kuppenheim
- DJK Konstanz
- Offenburger FV

Relegated to the new Verbandsliga:

- SV Kirchzarten
- SC Pfullendorf
- SV Weil am Rhein
- Bahlinger SC
- VfR Rheinfelden
- VfB Gaggenau
- FC Emmendingen
- FC Konstanz
- FC Gottmadingen
- VfR Achern

Relegated to the Landesliga:

- FV Lörrach
- FC Radolfzell

== Winners of the Amateurliga Südbaden ==
Season	Club
1945–46	**Fortuna Rastatt**; **VfL Konstanz**
1946–47	**Fortuna Freiburg**; **Eintracht Singen**; SpVgg Rheinfelden

Season	Club
1947–48	**ASV Villingen**
1948–49	**Lahrer FV**
1949–50	SC Baden-Baden
1950–51	FC 08 Villingen
1951–52	Offenburger FV
1952–53	Offenburger FV
1953–54	Offenburger FV
1954–55	FC Rastatt 04
1955–56	FC 08 Villingen
1956–57	FC Konstanz
1957–58	Offenburger FV
1958–59	**FC Singen 04**
1959–60	Offenburger FV
1960–61	Offenburger FV
1961–62	SC Baden–Baden

Season	Club
1962–63	FC Emmendingen
1963–64	**FC Emmendingen**
1964–65	SC Freiburg
1965–66	SV Oberkirch
1966–67	Offenburger FV
1967–68	SC Freiburg
1968–69	SV Waldkirch
1969–70	SV Waldkirch
1970–71	FC Emmendingen
1971–72	FC Rastatt 04
1972–73	SC Baden–Baden
1973–74	Offenburger FV
1974–75	Offenburger FV
1975–76	FC 08 Villingen
1976–77	**Freiburger FC**
1977–78	**SC Freiburg**

Source: "Verbandsliga Südbaden". Das deutsche Fussball–Archiv. Archived from the original on 7 March 2008.

- **Bold** denotes team gained promotion.
- In 1946, four teams went to the new Oberliga Südwest (southern group), the Fortuna Rastatt (FC Rastat 04), VfL Konstanz (FC Konstanz), VfL Freiburg (SC Freiburg) and SpVgg Offenburg (Offenburger FV).
- Promoted in 1947, the clubs real names are Freiburger FC and FC Singen 04.
- In 1949 runners-up SV Kuppenheim was also promoted.
