= SV Waldkirch =

- Full name: Sportverein Waldkirch e. V.
- Nickname(s): Blau-gelben (Blue-yellows)
- Founded: 1909
- Ground: Etztalstadion
- Capacity: 2,500
- Chairman: Tobias Brenzinger
- Manager: Benjamin Pfahler
- League: Verbandsliga Südbaden
- 2015–16: 8th
- Website: http://www.fussball-svw.de/

SV Waldkirch is a German amateur football club from Waldkirch, Baden-Württemberg. Founded in 1908, the team plays in the Verbandsliga Südbaden in the sixth tier of the German football league system.

== History ==
The club has long been a non-description amateur side. In 1960 it earned promotion to the tier three Amateurliga Südbaden but lasted for only one season before being relegated again. The club returned to the league in 1965 and played again as a lower table side until winning a league championship in 1969. It marked the club's strongest area with another league championship the year after, a second place in 1971 and a South Baden Cup win in 1972. The club declined after this and was relegated again in 1974.

The club played outside the regions top league for the next 35 years until 2010 SVW earned promotion to the tier six Verbandsliga Südbaden for the first time, where it plays today.

As the winners of the 2014 South Baden Cup, the club played in the 2014–15 DFB-Pokal. In the first round on 16 August, it lost 3–0 at home to SpVgg Greuther Fürth of the 2. Bundesliga.

== Honours ==
- South Baden Cup
  - Winners: (2) 1972, 2014
- Amateurliga Südbaden (III)
  - Champions: (2) 1969, 1970
  - Runners-up: 1971
- Landesliga Südbaden 2 (VII)
  - Champions: 2010

== Recent seasons ==
The recent season-by-season performance of the club:

| Season | Division | Tier | Position |
|---|---|---|---|
| 2003–04 | Landesliga Südbaden 2 | VI | 3rd |
| 2004–05 | Landesliga Südbaden 2 | VI | 8th |
| 2005–06 | Landesliga Südbaden 2 | VI | 13th |
| 2006–07 | Landesliga Südbaden 2 | VI | 8th |
| 2007–08 | Landesliga Südbaden 2 | VI | 9th |
| 2008–09 | Landesliga Südbaden 2 | VII | 11th |
| 2009–10 | Landesliga Südbaden 2 | VII | 1st ↑ |
| 2010–11 | Verbandsliga Südbaden | VI | 12th |
| 2011–12 | Verbandsliga Südbaden | VI | 10th |
| 2012–13 | Verbandsliga Südbaden | VI | 12th |
| 2013–14 | Verbandsliga Südbaden | VI | 8th |
| 2014–15 | Verbandsliga Südbaden | VI | 12th |
| 2015–16 | Verbandsliga Südbaden | VI | 8th |
| 2016–17 | Verbandsliga Südbaden | VI | |

- With the introduction of the Regionalligas in 1994 and the 3. Liga in 2008 as the new third tier, below the 2. Bundesliga, all leagues below dropped one tier.

=== Key ===
| ↑ Promoted | ↓ Relegated |
