= Kehler FV =

German football club

- Full name: Kehler Fußballverein 1907 e.V.
- Founded: 1907
- Ground: Kehler Rheinstadion
- Capacity: 12,500
- Chairman: Claus Haberecht
- Manager: Karim Matmour
- League: Verbandsliga Südbaden (VI)
- 2015–16: Oberliga Baden-Württemberg (V), 14th (relegated)
Home colours	Away colours

Kehler FV is a German association football club from the town of Kehl, Baden-Württemberg. In addition to fielding a football side, the club has departments for athletics, and badminton, as well as general fitness and recreational sport.

== History ==
The team was established in 1907, and from 1958 to 1966 and 1970–1974 played in the third tier Amateurliga Südbaden. Following several seasons as an "elevator club" moving frequently up and down between the Landesliga Südbaden (VI) and the Verbandsliga Südbaden (V), FV has advanced to the Oberliga Baden-Württemberg (V) following a second place Verbandsliga finish and successful promotion playoff in 2008.

The club played the next eight seasons in the Oberliga with an eighth place in 2012–13 as its best result but was relegated in 2015–16.

== Honours ==
The club's honours:

=== League ===
- Verbandsliga Südbaden
  - Runners-up: 2008
- Landesliga Südbaden
  - Champions: 2006

=== Cup ===
- South Baden Cup
  - Winners: 1957

=== Other ===
The club includes a successful bobsleigh department. Club member Bodo Bittner was part of the bronze medal-winning four-man team at the 1976 Winter Olympics. Peer Joechel won a gold medal at the 1993 World championships in the two-man competition.

Sprinter Georg Nückles was the European 400m indoor champion in 1972 and German indoor 400m champion in 1972 and 1973.

== Recent managers ==
Recent managers of the club:

Manager	Start	Finish
Bora Marković	1 July 1998	30 June 2014
Helmut Kröll	1 July 2014	18 January 2016
Alexander Hassenstein	19 January 2016	Present

== Recent seasons ==
The recent season-by-season performance of the club:

Season	Division	Tier	Position
1999–2000	Landesliga Südbaden I	VI	
2000–01	Landesliga Südbaden I	VI	↑
2001–02	Verbandsliga Südbaden	V	13th ↓
2002–03	Landesliga Südbaden	VI	↑
2003–04	Verbandsliga Südbaden	V	17th ↓
2004–05	Landesliga Südbaden I	VI	3rd
2005–06	Landesliga Südbaden I	VI	1st ↑
2006–07	Verbandsliga Südbaden	V	5th
2007–08	Verbandsliga Südbaden	V	2nd ↑
2008–09	Oberliga Baden-Württemberg	V	15th
2009–10	Oberliga Baden-Württemberg	V	11th
2010–11	Oberliga Baden-Württemberg	V	11th
2011–12	Oberliga Baden-Württemberg	V	10th
2012–13	Oberliga Baden-Württemberg	V	8th
2013–14	Oberliga Baden-Württemberg	V	11th
2014–15	Oberliga Baden-Württemberg	V	10th
2015–16	Oberliga Baden-Württemberg	V	14th ↓
2016–17	Verbandsliga Südbaden	VI	

- With the introduction of the Regionalligas in 1994 and the 3. Liga in 2008 as the new third tier, below the 2. Bundesliga, all leagues below dropped one tier.

↑ Promoted	↓ Relegated
