= FC Teningen =

German football club

Teningen
- Full name: Fußball Club Teningen e.V.
- Founded: 1929; 97 years ago
- Ground: Friedrich-Meyer-Stadion
- Capacity: 4,000
- Manager: Pascal Spöri
- League: Oberliga Baden-Württemberg (V)
- 2025–26: Verbandsliga Südbaden 1st of 16 (promoted)
Home colours

FC Teningen is a German association football club from Teningen, Baden.

== History ==
The association was founded in 1929 named TuS Teningen and from 1946 to 1949 SpV Teningen. 2000, the team captured the division title and was promoted to the Oberliga Baden-Württemberg (V). It was relegated from the Oberliga after only one season, back to the Verbandsliga. In 2007 it dropped to the Landesliga Südbaden and, in 2015, suffered relegation to the Bezirksliga.

FC also won the South Baden Cup three times, which earned the club a place in the DFB-Pokal (German Cup) tournament. In 2000–01 they lost against MSV Duisburg 0–3, four years later during the 2004–05 DFB-Pokal they played against 1. FC Nürnberg but lost 1–2. In June 2011 the club was drawn against FC Schalke 04 in the 2011–12 DFB-Pokal. The Bundesliga club overwhelmed Teningen 11–1.

== Honours ==
The club's honours:

=== League ===
- Verbandsliga Südbaden
  - Champions: 2000, 2002

=== Cup ===
- South Baden Cup
  - Winners: 2000, 2004, 2011
  - Runners-up: 2001

== Recent managers ==
Recent managers of the club:

Manager	Start	Finish
Claus Kraskovic	1 July 2008	Present

== Recent seasons ==
The recent season-by-season performance of the club:

Season	Division	Tier	Position
1999–2000	Verbandsliga Südbaden	V	1st ↑
2000–01	Oberliga Baden-Württemberg	IV	18th ↓
2001–02	Verbandsliga Südbaden	V	1st ↑
2002–03	Oberliga Baden-Württemberg	IV	16th ↓
2003–04	Verbandsliga Südbaden	V	3rd
2004–05	Verbandsliga Südbaden	V	10th
2005–06	Verbandsliga Südbaden	V	5th
2006–07	Verbandsliga Südbaden	V	13th ↓
2007–08	Landesliga Südbaden 2	VI	8th
2008–09	Landesliga Südbaden 2	VII	3rd
2009–10	Landesliga Südbaden 2	VII	2nd
2010–11	Landesliga Südbaden 2	VII	4th
2011–12	Landesliga Südbaden 2	VII	10th
2012–13	Landesliga Südbaden 2	VII	12th
2013–14	Landesliga Südbaden 2	VII	5th
2014–15	Landesliga Südbaden 2	VII	15th ↓
2015–16	Bezirksliga Freiburg	VIII	12th
2016–17	Bezirksliga Freiburg	VIII	

- With the introduction of the Regionalligas in 1994 and the 3. Liga in 2008 as the new third tier, below the 2. Bundesliga, all leagues below dropped one tier.

↑ Promoted	↓ Relegated
