= FC Denzlingen =

German football club

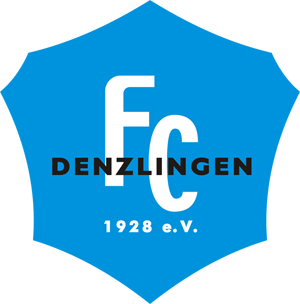
- Full name: Fussball-Club Denzlingen 1928 e.V.
- Founded: 7 January 1928
- Ground: Einbollenstadion
- Capacity: 4,000
- Chairman: Gebhard Gotterbarm
- Manager: Maximilian Heidenreich
- League: Verbandsliga Südbaden (VI)
- 2025–26: Oberliga Baden-Württemberg (V), 18th of 18 (relegated)
Home colours	Away colours

The FC Denzlingen is a German association football club from the city of Denzlingen, Baden-Württemberg.

The club's most notable achievements are playing in the highest football league in the state, the Oberliga Baden-Württemberg, from 1999 to 2002 and again in 2009–10. It also reached the first round of the German Cup once, in 1998.

== History ==
The FC Denzlingen was formed on 7 January 1928. From 1947, when it returned to competitive football after the war, to 1951, the club was known as SV Denzlingen.

The club did not make an impact on the football scene in South Baden until 1988, when it earned promotion to the tier-five Landesliga (English: State League) through a championship in the Bezirksliga Freiburg. FCD managed another promotion within two season, now to the Verbandsliga Südbaden, where it lasted for only one season.

In 1993, it made a more permanent return to the Verbandsliga. In 1998, it took out the South Baden Cup, which qualified the club for the first round of the national cup competition. There, on 29 August 1998 it met Hamburger SV and earned a respectable 3–0 defeat against the Fußball-Bundesliga team. The season proved to get even more successful when the club took out the league title and earned promotion to the Oberliga Baden-Württemberg for the first time.

At this level, the team struggled for three seasons, a twelfth place its best result, before being relegated again. FCD did not settle well back in the Verbandsliga and was relegated once more in 2004.

Its stint in the Landesliga was however only a short one, returning to the Verbandsliga immediately on the strength of a league championship. The club also reached the South Baden Cup final once more in 2005, but lost.

In 2008–09, the team had another successful season, winning promotion back to the Oberliga for a second stint, but lasted for only one season before going down again. After finishing second-last in the Verbandsliga in 2014–15 the club was relegated to the Landesliga but bounced back immediately through a league championship there.

== Honours ==
The club's honours:

=== League ===
- Verbandsliga Südbaden (V-VI)
  - Champions: 1999, 2009
- Landesliga Südbaden-Staffel II (V-VI)
  - Champions: 1990, 2005, 2016
- Bezirksliga Freiburg (VI)
  - Champions: 1988

=== Cup ===
- South Baden Cup
  - Winners: 1998
  - Runners-up: 2006

== Recent managers ==
Recent managers of the club:

Manager	Start	Finish
Uli Lehmann	1 July 2007	31 December 2007
Mario Bleier Christian Schloz Stefan Schütte	1 January 2008	30 June 2008
Michael Baumann	1 July 2008	31 December 2010
Midhat Mandžo Stefan Schütte	1 March 2013	1 March 2013

== Recent seasons ==
The recent season-by-season performance of the club:

Season	Division	Tier	Position
1999–2000	Oberliga Baden-Württemberg	IV	12th
2000–01	Oberliga Baden-Württemberg	IV	13th
2001–02	Oberliga Baden-Württemberg	IV	18th ↓
2002–03	Verbandsliga Südbaden	V	7th
2003–04	Verbandsliga Südbaden	V	16th ↓
2004–05	Landesliga Südbaden-Staffel II	VI	1st ↑
2005–06	Verbandsliga Südbaden	V	6th
2006–07	Verbandsliga Südbaden	V	4th
2007–08	Verbandsliga Südbaden	V	6th
2008–09	Verbandsliga Südbaden	VI	1st ↑
2009–10	Oberliga Baden-Württemberg	V	16th ↓
2010–11	Verbandsliga Südbaden	VI	8th
2011–12	Verbandsliga Südbaden	VI	9th
2012–13	Verbandsliga Südbaden	VI	7th
2013–14	Verbandsliga Südbaden	VI	11th
2014–15	Verbandsliga Südbaden	VI	15th ↓
2015–16	Landesliga Südbaden	VII	1st ↑
2016–17	Verbandsliga Südbaden	VI	

- With the introduction of the Regionalligas in 1994 and the 3. Liga in 2008 as the new third tier, below the 2. Bundesliga, all leagues below dropped one tier.

↑ Promoted	↓ Relegated
