= FC Emmendingen =

German football club

- Full name: Fußball-Club Emmendingen 1903 e.V.
- Founded: 1903
- Ground: Elzstadion
- Capacity: 10,000
- Chairman: Toni Graf-Baumann
- Manager: Michael Pfahler
- League: Landesliga Südbaden 2 (VII)
- 2015–16: 1st
Home colours	Away colours

FC Emmendingen is a German association football club from the town of Emmendingen, Baden-Württemberg.

== History ==
The club has roots that go back to the founding of FV Emmendingen in 1903. The present-day association was created out of the merger of that side and SV 1921 Emmendingen in 1956. The newly combined side advanced to the Amateurliga Südbaden (III) in 1957 and went on to enjoy mixed success through the 1960s. They finished as vice-champions in 1962 and captured their first title the following season. Although they failed to advance out of the promotion playoffs for the Regionalliga, they repeated as Amateurliga champions in 1964, and this time won their way through to the Regionalliga Süd (II). Emmendingen's season there was a disaster as the team gave up 158 goals while scoring only 31 in losing 33 matches and drawing 2, with their only victory coming in their second-to-last game of the campaign.

The club remained competitive at the Amateurliga level, capturing the Südbadischer Pokal (South Baden Cup) in 1966 and regularly earning upper-table finishes. The team had second-place finishes in 1969 and 1970, and were national amateur vice-champions in 1970. In 1971 Emmendingen claimed another Amateurliga title, took part in the promotion playoffs, and appeared again in the cup final. The club's performance became uneven, and, after another pair of second-place finishes in 1973 and 1974, they were relegated in 1979 from what had become the Verbandsliga Südbaden (IV).

After several seasons in the Landesliga Württemberg (V), the club returned to fourth-tier play in 1985. A second Südbadischer Pokal in 1986 earned Emmendingen its first appearance in DFB-Pokal (German Cup) play. A third cup win followed in 1988, and the club again appeared in the German Cup tournament, this time advancing to the second round before going out. The next season the team captured the Verbandsliga Südbaden (IV) championship to move up to the Oberliga Baden-Württemberg for 1989–90. Emmendigen was returned to the Verbandsliga and was unable to break through to the Oberliga despite strong performances through the 1990s. A vice-championship in 2005, followed by a successful promotion playoff run saw the team return to the Oberliga in 2005–06.

After two seasons in the Oberliga, the side was relegated back to the Verbandsliga, followed by a further drop to the Landesliga in 2009. However, the team spent only two seasons at this level before returning to the Verbandsliga, being instantly relegated again after coming last in the league in 2012.

== Honours ==
The club's honours:

=== League ===
- Amateurliga Südbaden (III)
  - Champions: 1963, 1964, 1971
- Verbandsliga Südbaden (IV)
  - Champions: 1989

=== Cup ===
- South Baden Cup
  - Winners: 1966, 1986, 1988, 2003
  - Runners-up: 1971, 1998, 2000

== Recent managers ==
Recent managers of the club:

Manager	Start	Finish
Valentin Herr	1 July 2006	31 March 2007
?	?	?
Michael Pfahler	?	Present

== Recent seasons ==
The recent season-by-season performance of the club:

Season	Division	Tier	Position
1999–2000	Verbandsliga Südbaden	V	3rd
2000–01	Verbandsliga Südbaden	V	2nd
2001–02	Verbandsliga Südbaden	V	3rd
2002–03	Verbandsliga Südbaden	V	2nd
2003–04	Verbandsliga Südbaden	V	4th
2004–05	Verbandsliga Südbaden	V	2nd ↑
2005–06	Oberliga Baden-Württemberg	IV	15th
2006–07	Oberliga Baden-Württemberg	IV	17th ↓
2007–08	Verbandsliga Südbaden	V	5th
2008–09	Verbandsliga Südbaden	VI	16th ↓
2009–10	Landesliga Südbaden 2	VII	7th
2010–11	Landesliga Südbaden 2	VII	2nd ↑
2011–12	Verbandsliga Südbaden	VI	16th ↓
2012–13	Landesliga Südbaden 2	VII	3rd
2013–14	Landesliga Südbaden 2	VII	7th
2014–15	Landesliga Südbaden 2	VII	9th
2015–16	Landesliga Südbaden 2	VII	11th
2016–17	Landesliga Südbaden 2	VII	

- With the introduction of the Regionalligas in 1994 and the 3. Liga in 2008 as the new third tier, below the 2. Bundesliga, all leagues below dropped one tier.

↑ Promoted	↓ Relegated
