= VfB Gaggenau =

German football club

- Full name: Verein für Bewegungsspiel Gaggenau 2001 e.V.
- Founded: Original: 27 July 1911 Reformed: 17 April 2001
- Ground: Traischbachstadion
- Capacity: 8,000
- Chairman: Gerd Pfrommer
- Manager: Gerd Pfrang
- League: Kreisliga A (IX)
- 2015–16: Bezirksliga Baden-Baden (VIII), 17th (relegation)
Home colours	Away colours

VfB Gaggenau is a German association football club from the city of Gaggenau, Baden-Württemberg established on 27 July 1911. Following World War II, football and sports clubs across the country were disbanded by occupying Allied authorities as part of the broader process of denazification. The team was reestablished in 1946 as Sportverein Gaggenau, which included the former memberships of VfB, Turnerbund Gaggenau, and Ski-Club Gaggenau. It was renamed VfB Gaggenau on 5 August 1950.

== History ==
VfB played local level football before the war, with the club taking part in the regional Südpokal (South German Cup) in 1922. Following the conflict, it became part of the Amateurliga Südbaden (III) in 1955 and, except for a second-place finish in 1960 and a third-place finish in 1963, earned generally lower table results. VfB was relegated in 1966 and did not return to Amateurliga play until 1977. They slipped to the Verbandsliga Südbaden (IV) through league restructuring the following season, and won their way to the Amateuroberliga Baden-Württemberg (IV) by winning the division title there in 1979. Their turn in the Amateuroberliga lasted just a single season and they did not return to fourth-tier play until 1986. In the 1994–95 season, the Amateuroberliga became the Oberliga Baden-Württemberg (IV). VfB narrowly missed demotion that year when GSV Maichingen voluntarily went down instead, but could not escape being sent down after another poor finish in the following campaign.

VfB has made several appearances (1976, 1980, 1981, 1990, 1994, 1996) in preliminary round play for the DFB Pokal (German Cup), going out after first round losses in each instance.

The club was bankrupt at the turn of the millennium, dropping out of the Verbandsliga in 2000–01, after having played 20 of 30 rounds, and was reestablished on 17 April 2001, restarting play in the tier nine Kreisliga B. After capturing the Bezirksliga Baden-Baden title in 2009, VfB played in the Landesliga Südbaden 1 (VII) until 2014, when the club was relegated back to the Bezirksliga. At the end of the 2015–16 season, the club suffered another relegation, now to the Kreisliga.

== Honours ==
The club's honours:

=== League ===
- Verbandsliga Südbaden
  - Champions: 1979, 1986
- Bezirksliga Baden-Baden
  - Champions: 2009
- Kreisliga A Baden-Baden Nord
  - Champions: 2007
- Kreisliga B Baden-Baden 4
  - Champions: 2006

=== Cup ===
- South Baden Cup
  - Winners: 1980, 1989, 1993, 1995

== Recent seasons ==
The recent season-by-season performance of the club:

Season	Division	Tier	Position
1999–2000	Verbandsliga Südbaden	V	12th
2000–01	Verbandsliga Südbaden	V	16th ↓
2001–02			
2002–03			
2003–04	Kreisliga B Baden-Baden 4	IX	3rd
2004–05	Kreisliga B Baden-Baden 4	IX	3rd
2005–06	Kreisliga B Baden-Baden 4	IX	1st ↑
2006–07	Kreisliga A Baden-Baden Nord	VIII	1st ↑
2007–08	Bezirksliga Baden-Baden	VII	7th
2008–09	Bezirksliga Baden-Baden	VIII	1st ↑
2009–10	Landesliga Südbaden 1	VII	4th
2010–11	Landesliga Südbaden 1	VII	2nd
2011–12	Landesliga Südbaden 1	VII	12th
2012–13	Landesliga Südbaden 1	VII	9th
2013–14	Landesliga Südbaden 1	VII	15th ↓
2014–15	Bezirksliga Baden-Baden	VIII	7th
2015–16	Bezirksliga Baden-Baden	VIII	17th ↓
2016–17	Kreisliga A	IX	

- With the introduction of the Regionalligas in 1994 and the 3. Liga in 2008 as the new third tier, below the 2. Bundesliga, all leagues below dropped one tier.

↑ Promoted	↓ Relegated
