= SV Oberachern =

German football club

- Full name: Sportverein Oberachern e.V.
- Founded: 1928
- Ground: Waldsportplatz
- Capacity: 1,500
- Chairman: Stefano Buck
- Manager: Fabian Himmel
- League: Oberliga Baden-Württemberg (V)
- 2025–26: Oberliga Baden-Württemberg, 6th of 18
Home colours	Away colours

SV Oberachern is a German association football club from the town of Achern, Baden-Württemberg. The club plays in the Oberliga Baden-Württemberg, in the fifth tier of the German football league system.

== History ==
Formed in 1928 the club has long been a local amateur side, rising as far as the Landesliga on occasion. It experienced a measure of success in 1996 when it reached the final of the South Baden Cup but lost to FV Donaueschingen.

The club's rise began in the early 2000s, winning promotion to the Bezirksliga from the Kreisliga in 2004. It earned promotion to the tier six Landesliga Südbaden 1 after a title in the Bezirksliga Baden-Baden in 2005.

In the Verbandsliga Südbaden from 2009 onwards, SVO improved season by season, finishing ninth in 2010, fourth in 2011 and runners-up in 2012. The latter allowed the club participation in the promotion round to the Oberliga but it lost to TSG Weinheim on aggregate in the first round. The club had a better 2012–13 season, winning the Verbandsliga and earning direct promotion to the Oberliga Baden-Württemberg. In this league SVO came last in 2013–14 and was relegated back to the Verbandsliga Südbaden. In 2015 it won the league for the second time and another promotion back to the Oberliga.

== Players ==
Note: Flags indicate national team as defined under FIFA eligibility rules; some limited exceptions apply. Players may hold more than one non-FIFA nationality.

No.	Pos.	Nation	Player
27	MF	LAO	Roman Angot

== Honours ==
The club's honours:

=== League ===
- Verbandsliga Südbaden
  - Champions: 2013, 2015
  - Runners-up: 2012
- Bezirksliga Baden-Baden
  - Champions: 2005
- Kreisliga A Süd
  - Champions: 2004

=== Cup ===
- South Baden Cup
  - Champions: 2022, 2023
  - Runners-up: 1996, 2016, 2020

== Recent seasons ==
The recent season-by-season performance of the club:

Season	Division	Tier	Position
2003–04	Kreisliga A Süd	VIII	1st ↑
2004–05	Bezirksliga Baden-Baden	VII	1st ↑
2005–06	Landesliga Südbaden 1	VI	10th
2006–07	Landesliga Südbaden 1	VI	4th
2007–08	Landesliga Südbaden 1	VI	10th
2008–09	Landesliga Südbaden 1	VII (Note: With the introduction of the Regionalligas in 1994 and the 3. Liga in 2008 as the new third tier, below the 2. Bundesliga, all leagues below dropped one tier.)	2nd ↑
2009–10	Verbandsliga Südbaden	VI	9th
2010–11	Verbandsliga Südbaden	VI	4th
2011–12	Verbandsliga Südbaden	VI	2nd
2012–13	Verbandsliga Südbaden	VI	1st ↑
2013–14	Oberliga Baden-Württemberg	V	18th ↓
2014–15	Verbandsliga Südbaden	VI	1st ↑
2015–16	Oberliga Baden-Württemberg	V	7th
2016–17	Oberliga Baden-Württemberg	V	13th
2017–18	Oberliga Baden-Württemberg	V	11th
2018–19	Oberliga Baden-Württemberg	V	14th
2019–20 (Note: Season curtailed due to COVID-19 pandemic in Germany)	Oberliga Baden-Württemberg	V	5th
2020–21	Oberliga Baden-Württemberg	V	17th
2021–22	Oberliga Baden-Württemberg	V	13th
2022–23	Oberliga Baden-Württemberg	V	6th

↑ Promoted	↓ Relegated
