= SC Baden-Baden =

German football club

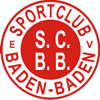
- Full name: Sport-Club Baden-Baden 1902 e.V.
- Founded: 1902
- Ground: Aumattstadion
- League: Kreisliga A Baden-Baden (IX)
- 2015–16: Kreisliga B Baden-Baden 4 (X), 1st (promoted)

SC Baden-Baden is a German football club from the town of Baden-Baden, Baden-Württemberg.

== History ==
The club was founded as Fußball-Verein Baden-Baden in 1902, and merged with neighbors Fußball-Club Olympia 1904 in 1919 to become Sportverinigung Baden-Baden 1902. SpVgg merged with another neighboring club VfB 1920 Baden-Baden West in 1945 and adopted the present name a year later.

SC was a founding member of the Landesliga Südbaden (later Amateurliga Südbaden) in 1945. It first won the league in 1950, but it was not promoted when the league became a third-tier competition and feeder to the new 2. Oberliga Süd (II). The club participated in the promotion rounds to the 2. Oberliga as South Baden runners-up in 1952 but lost. In 1958 SC was relegated to the 2. Amateurliga (IV) but returned to the Landesliga next season and in 1962 became South Baden champions for the second time. For this win, they earned an entry in the promotion round once again but lost promotion to VfR Heilbronn in the last match 2–0. SC joined the promotion round to the Regionalliga Süd (II) via a third South Baden title in 1973 but again, it ended up last and failed. In 1977 SC was definitely relegated from the Amateurliga and in the next decades, played in lower, regional leagues. Today they play in Kreisliga A Baden-Baden (IX).

== Stadium ==
The Club play their home games at the Aumattstadion in Baden-Baden. The ground has a capacity of around 6000 (mostly standing, and the matches take place on a floodlit natural-grass surface surrounded by an athletics track. It is the main sports ground in the city.

== Honors ==
- Landesliga/Amateurliga Südbaden
  - Winners: 1950, 1962, 1973
