= 1. FC Rielasingen-Arlen =

German football club

- Founded: 1999
- Ground: Sportanlage an den Talwiesen
- Capacity: 1,500
- League: Oberliga Baden-Württemberg (V)
- 2020-21: Oberliga Baden-Württemberg (V), 16th of 21

1. FC Rielasingen-Arlen is a German football club based in Rielasingen-Worblingen in the state of Baden-Württemberg. It was founded in 1999 as a merger between FV Arlen (1906) and FC Rielasingen (1919). It plays in the Oberliga Baden-Württemberg in the fifth tier of the German football league system.

The team won the 2016–17 South Baden Cup, defeating VfR Hausen 6–1 in the final. In doing so, they qualified for the first time for the DFB-Pokal. In the first round on 12 August 2017, they hosted Bundesliga club Borussia Dortmund at SC Freiburg's Schwarzwald-Stadion, losing 4–0.

== Players ==
=== First Team Squad ===
As of 30 September 2021

Note: Flags indicate national team as defined under FIFA eligibility rules. Players may hold more than one non-FIFA nationality Note: Flags indicate national team as defined under FIFA eligibility rules; some limited exceptions apply. Players may hold more than one non-FIFA nationality.

No.	Pos.	Nation	Player
1	GK	GER	Dennis Klose
4	MF	CMR	Boris Mpon
5	FW	AUT	Pascal Sagmeister
6	MF	GER	Tobias Bertsch (captain)
7	DF	GER	Pascal Rasmus
8	DF	POR	Dominik Compagnucci Almeida
9	MF	GER	Nico Kunze
10	MF	ITA	Gianluca Serpa
11	FW	ALB	Albert Malaj
13	DF	GER	Daniel Niedermann
14	MF	GER	John Schmidtke
16	MF	GER	Daniel Wehrle
19	FW	GER	Leon Bohlander
20	MF	GER	Jonah Adrovic
23	FW	GER	Stephan Ohmacht

No.	Pos.	Nation	Player
24	FW	JPN	Ryotaro Tomizawa
25	DF	GER	Danny Berger
26	MF	GER	Laurin Tost
27	DF	GER	Christoph Matt
28	GK	GER	Tim Reitze
31	FW	ESP	Fabio Moreno Fell
33	MF	GER	Gian-Luca Wellhäuser
40	GK	GER	Tim Stelzl
44	DF	GER	Luis Weber

== Honours ==
- South Baden Cup
  - Champions: 2017, 2020
