= FC 08 Villingen =

- Full name: Fußball-Club 1908 Villingen e.V.
- Nickname: 08
- Founded: 1 October 1908; 117 years ago
- Ground: Friedengrund
- Capacity: 12,000
- Manager: Steffen Breinlinger
- League: Oberliga Baden-Württemberg (V)
- 2025–26: Oberliga Baden-Württemberg, 9th of 18
Home colours	Away colours

FC 08 Villingen is a German association football club based in Villingen-Schwenningen, Baden-Württemberg. The association was founded on 1 October 1908 and over time absorbed other local clubs including Germania, Alemania and Phönix.

== History ==
By the mid-20s the club was playing in the highest level local league, the Bezirksliga Baden, but had descended to lower level play by the early 30s. They recovered themselves to return to high level district league play by the end of the decade and in 1935 sent defender Hermann Gramlich (3 caps) to the national side.

Following World War II all organizations in the country, including football and sports associations, were ordered dissolved by occupying Allied authorities. Most were quickly re-established, including the Villingen side which was re-formed as ASV Villingen before once again assuming its traditional identity in 1949. In 1951 FC Villingen was promoted to the Amateurliga Südbaden (II) where they immediately took the division title. The club continued to play well and repeated as champions in 1955, after which they slipped to become a mid-table side.

After the 1959–60 season the club became part of the newly formed Amateurliga Schwarzwald-Bodensee (III) where they played until elevated to the second division Regionalliga Süd after a title win in 1966. They earned mid-table results there until being relegated in 1972 carrying with them a heavy debt burden that hobbled the club for years. They captured Amateurliga Schwarzwald-Bodensee (III) championships in 1973 and 1974 before moving over to the Amateurliga Südbaden, in what was now fourth-tier football after league re-organization in the country, where they won their third title in four years in 1976. Through the 70s the team enjoyed success in regional cup play taking the Südbadischer Pokal in 1974, 1976, and 1979.

After another shuffle of German football leagues, 08 was placed in the newly formed Amateur Oberliga Baden-Württemberg (III) where they played for a couple of seasons before descending to the Verbandsliga Südbaden (IV) in 1980. They twice clawed their way back up on the strength of Verbandsliga titles in 1983 and 1985 before settling into fourth-tier play until the mid-90s. A second-place finish in 1994 kept the club in fourth-division play in the Oberliga Baden-Württemberg for a single season, after which they were relegated to the now fifth division Verbandliga Südbaden. Since the turn of the millennium the club has played as an "elevator side" moving up and down between the Verbandsliga and Oberliga. Villingen currently plays in the Oberliga Baden-Württemberg (IV) after being promoted following their latest Verbandsliga title in 2006. In the 2014–15 season the club came third-last in the league and was nominally relegated but the withdrawal of VfR Aalen II and the promotion of Bahlinger SC to the Regionalliga meant Villingen survived in the league for another season before being relegated in 2016.

== Stadium ==
The club plays its home matches at the Friedengrund which was built in 1960 and has a capacity of 12,000 (800 seats). From 1925 to 1961 FCV played at the Waldstraße.

== Current squad ==
As of 8 September 2026

Note: Flags indicate national team as defined under FIFA eligibility rules; some limited exceptions apply. Players may hold more than one non-FIFA nationality.

No.	Pos.	Nation	Player
1	GK	GER	Kevin Ehmann
2	DF	GER	Jonathan Spät
3	DF	GER	Noah Haller
4	DF	GER	Enrico Krieger
5	DF	GER	Jonas Busam
6	MF	GER	Georgios Pintidis
7	MF	GER	Kevin Müller
8	MF	GER	Nico Tadić
9	FW	GER	Dominik Emminger
10	MF	GER	Lucas Torres
11	MF	GER	Gabriel Cristilli
12	GK	ALB	Andrea Hoxha

No.	Pos.	Nation	Player
14	MF	GER	Noah Kälble
16	FW	GER	Yannick Spät
17	MF	GER	Louis Leberer
18	MF	GER	Matthes Glück
19	MF	GER	Pascal Staiger
20	FW	CRO	Jan Babic
21	DF	GER	Luis Seemann
22	MF	GER	Leon Albrecht
24	MF	ITA	Denis Hoxha
25	DF	GER	Fabio Liserra
26	FW	GER	Gian-Luca Feißt
27	DF	GER	Angelo Rinaldi

== Honours ==
The club's honours:

=== League ===
- Bezirksliga Baden
  - Champions: 1936
- Amateurliga Südbaden (III)
  - Champions: 1948, 1951, 1956, 1976
  - Runners-up: 1953
- Amateurliga Schwarzwald-Bodensee (III)
  - Champions: 1966, 1973, 1974
- Verbandsliga Südbaden (IV/V/VI)
  - Champions: 1983, 1985, 2001, 2004, 2006, 2017
  - Runners-up: 1994

=== Cup ===
- South Baden Cup (tiers III–VII)
  - Winners: 1950, 1974, 1976, 1979, 2005, 2007, 2009, 2016, 2019, 2021, 2024

== Recent managers ==
Recent managers of the club:

Manager	Start	Finish
Kristijan Đorđević	1 July 2005	11 May 2008
Reiner Scheu	1 July 2008	16 April 2010
Arasch Yahyaijan	16 April 2010	30 June 2010
Martin Braun	1 July 2010	22 April 2015
Markus Knackmuß (caretaker)	22 April 2015	30 June 2015
Lothar Mattner	1 July 2015	

== Recent seasons ==
The recent season-by-season performance of the club:

Season	Division	Tier	Position
1999–2000	Verbandsliga Südbaden	V	7th
2000–01	Verbandsliga Südbaden	V	1st ↑
2001–02	Oberliga Baden-Württemberg	IV	14th
2002–03	Oberliga Baden-Württemberg	IV	17th ↓
2003–04	Verbandsliga Südbaden	V	1st ↑
2004–05	Oberliga Baden-Württemberg	IV	16th ↓
2005–06	Verbandsliga Südbaden	V	1st ↑
2006–07	Oberliga Baden-Württemberg	IV	4th
2007–08	Oberliga Baden-Württemberg	IV	6th
2008–09	Oberliga Baden-Württemberg	V	12th
2009–10	Oberliga Baden-Württemberg	V	13th
2010–11	Oberliga Baden-Württemberg	V	3rd
2011–12	Oberliga Baden-Württemberg	V	12th
2012–13	Oberliga Baden-Württemberg	V	11th
2013–14	Oberliga Baden-Württemberg	V	6th
2014–15	Oberliga Baden-Württemberg	V	16th
2015–16	Oberliga Baden-Württemberg	V	16th ↓
2016–17	Verbandsliga Südbaden	VI	1st ↑
2017–18	Oberliga Baden-Württemberg	V	2nd
2018–19	Oberliga Baden-Württemberg	V	8th

- With the introduction of the Regionalligas in 1994 and the 3. Liga in 2008 as the new third tier, below the 2. Bundesliga, all leagues below dropped one tier.

↑ Promoted	↓ Relegated
