= FC Rastatt 04 =

- Full name: Fußball-Club Rastatt 04 e.V.
- Nickname(s): FC 04
- Founded: 1904
- Ground: Münchfeldstadion
- Capacity: 15.000
- Chairman: Holger Zimmer
- Manager: Harald Heck
- League: Kreisliga A (IX)
- 2015–16: Bezirksliga Baden-Baden (VIII), 16th (relegation)
Home colours	Away colours

FC Rastatt 04 is a German association football club from the city of Rastatt, Baden-Württemberg. It was established as Fußball-Klub Rastatt on 9 October 1904 at the Gasthaus zur Linde. A 1919 union with Fußball-Club Phoenix created Rastatt Fußballverein 04, which merged with Frankonia 1912 Rastatt on 23 August 1939 to form FC Rastatt 04. The club enjoyed its greatest success in the 1930s, 1940s, and early 1950s when it took part in top-flight regional competition in southwestern Germany.

== History ==
FV won promotion to the senior regional circuit, the Bezirksliga Württemberg/Baden, in 1928, where they finished as vice champions in 1932. Their performance slipped the following season, and as a result, they failed to qualify for play in the Gauliga Baden, one of 16 new regional top-flight divisions formed in the reorganization of German football in 1933. They made single season appearances in Gauliga play in 1936 and 1939 (now playing as FC). They were also part of that league from 1941 to 1944, until it was reduced to a rump circuit in 1944–45 when the region fell to advancing Allied forces in the latter stages of World War II.

Following the conflict, occupying Allied authorities disbanded organizations across the country, including football and sports clubs, as part of the process of denazification. The club was reestablished in 1946 as SV Fortuna Rastatt and reclaimed its traditional identity as FC Rastatt 04 on 20 January 1950. As Fortuna, the team captured the Landesliga Südbaden title in 1946 and advanced to the first division Oberliga Südwest/Süd where they won the title in 1948. Through league restructuring at the end of the 1949–50 season, the Oberliga Südwest/Nord continued as the Oberliga Südwest, while the Oberliga Südwest/Süd was integrated into the Oberliga Süd. FC's eighth-place finish in that campaign was not good enough to qualify the side for continued Oberliga play and they slipped into the Amateurliga Südbaden (II).

In 1963, with the formation of the Bundesliga as the nationwide first division and the second-tier Regionalligen, Rastatt remained part of the now third-tier Amateurliga. They captured the championship there in 1972 and, following a second-place result in 1978, became part of the new Amateuroberliga Baden-Württemberg (III). The club struggled there and after a series of lower table finishes was finally sent down to the Verbandsliga Südbaden (IV) in 1986. They remained in Verbandsliga competition, except for a three-season (1996–99) descent to the Landesliga Südbaden (VI), until 2005. They were relegated again at the end of the 2004–05 campaign and had been part of Landesliga play until 2015 when the club finished last in the league and was relegated to the Bezirksliga. Another relegation followed in the 2015–16 season, now to the Kreisliga A.

FC Rastatt has been one of the most successful clubs in the South Baden Cup, having won the competition five times, in 1946, 1973, 1977, 1981 and 1984. In their most recent cup final appearance in 2002 they were beaten (0:1) by Bahlinger SC. The club has also taken part in the DFB-Pokal (German Cup) tournament on three occasions going out in the first round to Waldhof Mannheim in 1973 and to VfB Stuttgart in 1981. Their furthest advance came in 1977 when they were put out in the second round by Bayer Leverkusen.

== Honours ==
The club's honours:

=== League ===
- Oberliga Südwest (southern division)
  - Champions: 1948
- Amateurliga Südbaden (III)
  - Champions: 1955, 1972
  - Runners-up: 1978
- Verbandsliga Südbaden (IV)
  - Runners-up: 1993

=== Cup ===
- South Baden Cup (Tiers III-VII)
  - Winners: 1946, 1973, 1977, 1981, 1984
  - Runners-up: 2002

== Recent seasons ==
The recent season-by-season performance of the club:

Season	Division	Tier	Position
1999–2000	Landesliga Südbaden	VI	↑
2000–01	Verbandsliga Südbaden	V	8th
2001–02	Verbandsliga Südbaden	V	5th
2002–03	Verbandsliga Südbaden	V	3rd
2003–04	Verbandsliga Südbaden	V	5th
2004–05	Verbandsliga Südbaden	V	14th ↓
2005–06	Landesliga Südbaden-I	VI	8th
2006–07	Landesliga Südbaden-I	VI	2nd ↑
2007–08	Verbandsliga Südbaden	V	10th
2008–09	Verbandsliga Südbaden	VI	4th
2009–10	Verbandsliga Südbaden	VI	13th ↓
2010–11	Landesliga Südbaden-I	VII	3rd
2011–12	Landesliga Südbaden-I	VII	8th
2012–13	Landesliga Südbaden-I	VII	8th
2013–14	Landesliga Südbaden-I	VII	9th
2014–15	Landesliga Südbaden-I	VII	16th ↓
2015–16	Bezirksliga Südbaden	VIII	17th ↓
2016–17	Kreisliga A	IX	

- With the introduction of the Regionalligas in 1994 and the 3. Liga in 2008 as the new third tier, below the 2. Bundesliga, all leagues below dropped one tier.

=== Key ===
↑ Promoted	↓ Relegated
