= Bahlinger SC =

German football club

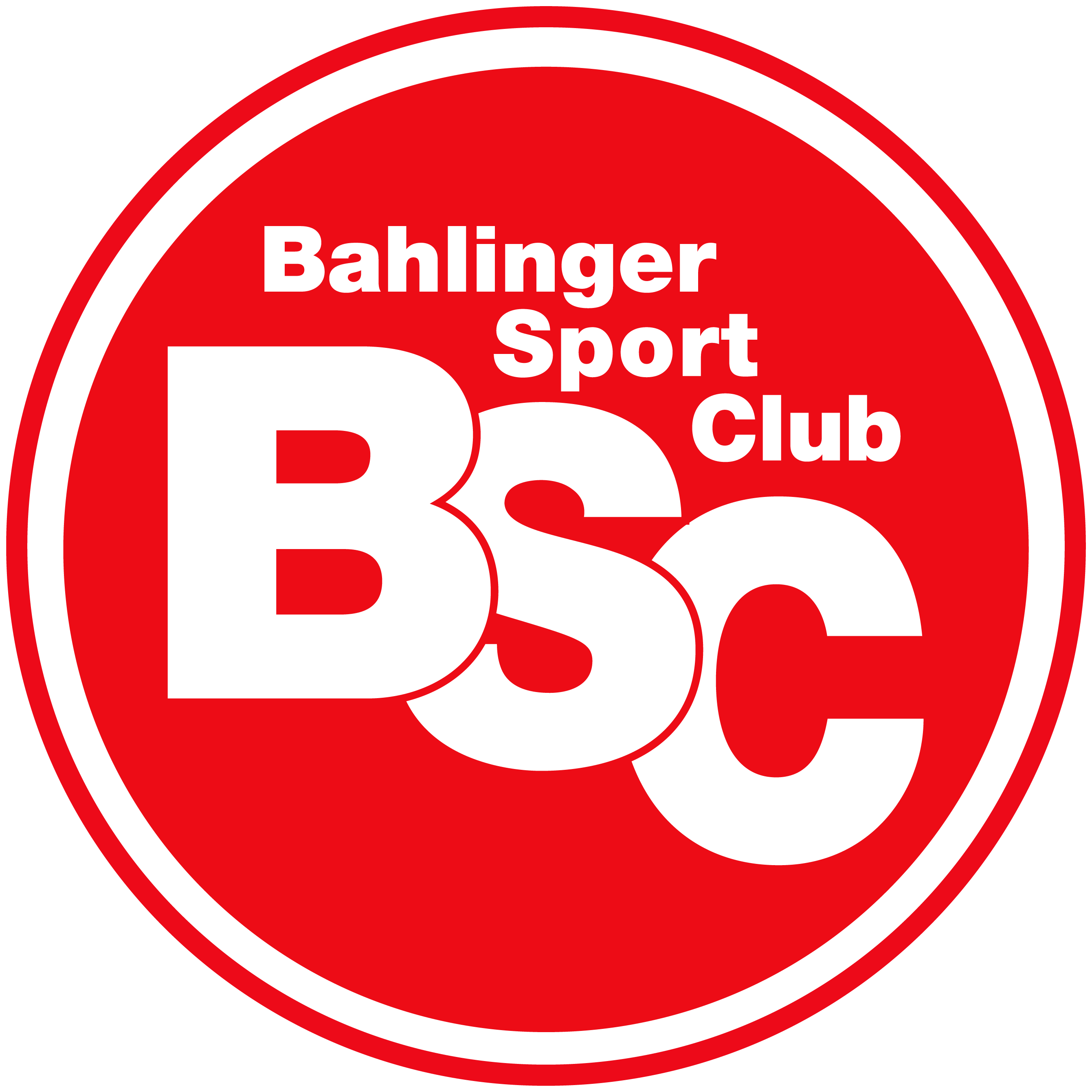
- Full name: Bahlinger Sportclub e. V.
- Founded: 16 June 1929
- Ground: Kaiserstuhlstadion
- Capacity: 5,000
- Chairman: Dieter Bühler
- Manager: Stefan Reisinger
- League: Oberliga Baden-Württemberg (V)
- 2025–26: Regionalliga Südwest, 18th of 18 (relegated)
- Website: https://www.bahlingersc.de
Home colours	Away colours

Bahlinger SC, also known as Bahlinger SC or simply Bahlinger, is a German association football club from the Kaiserstuhl town of Bahlingen, Baden-Württemberg.

== History ==
The club was founded 16 June 1929 as FC Bahlingen and merged with TV Bahlingen in 1946 to form the present-day side. Since the early 1960s BSC has played largely as a fourth tier amateur side. In 1969 the club advanced to third division play where they spent nine seasons until league reorganization saw them placed in the now fourth tier Amateurliga Südbaden. Another reorganization in the early 1990s saw the Amateurliga become a fifth division league.

Bahlinger narrowly missed advancing to the Oberliga Baden-Württemberg (IV) in 1994 and 1995. They took the step up on the strength of a Verbandsliga championship in 1996. The club enjoyed a nine season long turn in the Oberliga where their best result was a fifth-place finish in 1997. A Südbadischer Pokal (South Baden Cup) win in 2002 earned an appearance in the 2003 German Cup where they beat Alemannia Aachen 1:0 in the first round before going out 1:2 to SV Waldhof Mannheim. BSC then slipped to the fifth division in 2005 before returning to the Oberliga Baden-Württemberg for 2006–07 after a single season absence.

The club made an excellent start into the 2011–12 season, defeating FV Illertissen 11–0 in the opening round, eventually finishing eleventh in 2012 and as high as sixth in 2013. In 2014 however the club played closer to the relegation zone, eventually coming 14th. In the 2014–15 season the club finished runners-up in the Oberliga and thereby qualified for the promotion round to the Regionalliga Südwest. After a draw against TSV Lehnerz and a win over SC Hauenstein the club was promoted to the Regionalliga for the first time, but lasted for only one season before being relegated again. By winning the 2018–19 season of the Oberliga, the club returned to Regionalliga.

== Honours ==
=== League ===
- Oberliga Baden-Württemberg
  - Champions: 2019
  - Runners-up: 2015
- Verbandsliga Südbaden
  - Champions: 1996
  - Runners-up: 1994, 1995, 2006

=== Cup ===
- South Baden Cup
  - Winners: 2002, 2013, 2015, 2024–25, 2025–26
- DFB Cup
  - Participant: 2002, 2013, 2015

== Players ==
As of 8 September 2026

Note: Flags indicate national team as defined under FIFA eligibility rules; some limited exceptions apply. Players may hold more than one non-FIFA nationality.

No.	Pos.	Nation	Player
1	GK	GER	Dennis Klose
2	DF	GER	Fabian Schmid
3	DF	GER	Christian Cernenchi
4	DF	GER	Nicolas Garcia Stein
5	MF	GER	Laurin Tost
6	MF	GER	Holger Bux
7	FW	CRO	Marin Štefotić
8	DF	GER	Kolja Herrmann
9	FW	EST	Nikita Ebel
10	FW	GER	Davino Knappe
11	MF	GER	Alex Echner
13	MF	SRB	Robin Geller
14	DF	GER	Rico Wehrle

No.	Pos.	Nation	Player
19	DF	FRA	Logan Bouebari
20	MF	GER	Marco Bauer
21	MF	GER	Julde Riggenmann
22	DF	GER	Ashley Ketterer
23	MF	GER	Luka Schröder
25	DF	GER	Rico Wuttke
27	MF	MNE	Hasan Pepić
29	GK	GER	Simon Heering
30	DF	GER	Fynn Lienert
33	GK	GER	Luca Volk
37	MF	GER	Silas Drumm
38	DF	GER	Philipp Sonn

== Recent managers ==
Recent managers of the club:

Manager	Start	Finish
(Germany) Rainer Scharinger	1 July 2004	30 June 2006
(Germany) Lars Hermel	1 July 2006	10 October 2007
(Serbia) Milorad Pilipović	11 October 2007	30 June 2010
(Germany) Jens Scheuer	1 July 2010	27 November 2011
(Germany) Alexander Hassenstein	9 January 2012	12 April 2014
(Serbia) Milorad Pilipović	12 April 2014	30 June 2016
(Bosnia and Herzegovina) Zlatan Bajramović	1 July 2016	29 December 2016
(Germany) Alfons Higl	3 January 2017	30 June 2018
(Germany) Dennis Bührer (Germany) Axel Siefert	1 July 2018	

== Recent seasons ==
The recent season-by-season performance of the club:

Season	Division	Tier	Position
1947–48	Kreisklasse (North Division)	VI	3rd
1948–49	Kreisklasse (North Division)	VI	1st ↑
1949–50	Bezirksklasse Freiburg (North Division)	V	6th
1950–51	Bezirksklasse Freiburg (North Division)	V	8th
1951–52	Bezirksklasse Freiburg (North Division)	V	9th ↓
1952–53	B-Klasse Freiburg (North-West Division)	VI	1st ↑
1953–54	A-Klasse Freiburg	V	2nd
1954–55	A-Klasse Freiburg	V	5th
1955–56	A-Klasse Freiburg	V	5th
1956–57	A-Klasse Freiburg	V	7th
1957–58	A-Klasse Freiburg	V	unknown
1958–59	A-Klasse Freiburg	V	unknown
1959–60	A-Klasse Freiburg	V	1st ↑
1960–61	Amateurliga Südbaden (2nd division)	IV	12th
1961–62	Amateurliga Südbaden (2nd division)	IV	unknown
1962–63	Amateurliga Südbaden (2nd division)	IV	unknown
1963–64	Amateurliga Südbaden (2nd division)	IV	14th
1964–65	Amateurliga Südbaden (2nd division)	IV	10th
1965–66	Amateurliga Südbaden (2nd division)	IV	10th
1966–67	Amateurliga Südbaden (2nd division)	IV	5th
1967–68	Amateurliga Südbaden (2nd division)	IV	2nd
1968–69	Amateurliga Südbaden (2nd division)	IV	1st ↑
1969–70	Amateurliga Südbaden (1st division)	III	8th
1970–71	Amateurliga Südbaden (1st division)	III	8th
1971–72	Amateurliga Südbaden (1st division)	III	6th
1972–73	Amateurliga Südbaden (1st division)	III	4th
1973–74	Amateurliga Südbaden (1st division)	III	4th
1974–75	Amateurliga Südbaden (1st division)	III	7th
1975–76	Amateurliga Südbaden (1st division)	III	8th
1976–77	Amateurliga Südbaden (1st division)	III	11th
1977–78	Amateurliga Südbaden (1st division)	III	10th ↓
1978–79	Verbandsliga Südbaden	IV	6th
1979–80	Verbandsliga Südbaden	IV	6th
1980–81	Verbandsliga Südbaden	IV	7th
1981–82	Verbandsliga Südbaden	IV	8th
1982–83	Verbandsliga Südbaden	IV	3rd
1983–84	Verbandsliga Südbaden	IV	2nd
1984–85	Verbandsliga Südbaden	IV	5th
1985–86	Verbandsliga Südbaden	IV	5th
1986–87	Verbandsliga Südbaden	IV	5th
1987–88	Verbandsliga Südbaden	IV	6th
1988–89	Verbandsliga Südbaden	IV	12th
1989–90	Verbandsliga Südbaden	IV	12th
1990–91	Verbandsliga Südbaden	IV	9th
1991–92	Verbandsliga Südbaden	IV	8th
1992–93	Verbandsliga Südbaden	IV	6th
1993–94	Verbandsliga Südbaden	IV	3rd
1994–95	Verbandsliga Südbaden	V	2nd
1995–96	Verbandsliga Südbaden	V	1st ↑
1996–97	Oberliga Baden-Württemberg	IV	5th
1997–98	Oberliga Baden-Württemberg	IV	8th
1998–99	Oberliga Baden-Württemberg	IV	6th
1999–00	Oberliga Baden-Württemberg	IV	9th
2000–01	Oberliga Baden-Württemberg	IV	12th
2001–02	Oberliga Baden-Württemberg	IV	9th
2002–03	Oberliga Baden-Württemberg	IV	14th
2003–04	Oberliga Baden-Württemberg	IV	15th
2004–05	Oberliga Baden-Württemberg	IV	17th ↓
2005–06	Verbandsliga Südbaden	V	2nd ↑
2006–07	Oberliga Baden-Württemberg	IV	12th
2007–08	Oberliga Baden-Württemberg	IV	13th
2008–09	Oberliga Baden-Württemberg	V	6th
2009–10	Oberliga Baden-Württemberg	V	3rd
2010–11	Oberliga Baden-Württemberg	V	13th
2011–12	Oberliga Baden-Württemberg	V	11th
2012–13	Oberliga Baden-Württemberg	V	6th
2013–14	Oberliga Baden-Württemberg	V	14th
2014–15	Oberliga Baden-Württemberg	V	2nd ↑
2015–16	Regionalliga Südwest	IV	14th ↓
2016–17	Oberliga Baden-Württemberg	V	5th
2017–18	Oberliga Baden-Württemberg	V	9th
2018–19	Oberliga Baden-Württemberg	V	1st ↑
2019–20	Regionalliga Südwest	IV	11th
2020–21	Regionalliga Südwest	IV	9th
2021-22	Regionalliga Südwest	IV	9th
2022-23	Regionalliga Südwest	IV	10th
2023-24	Regionalliga Südwest	IV	13th
2024-25	Regionalliga Südwest	IV	14th
2025-26	Regionalliga Südwest	IV	18th ↓

- With the introduction of the Regionalligas in 1994 and the 3. Liga in 2008 as the new third tier, below the 2. Bundesliga, all leagues below dropped one tier.

=== Key ===
↑ Promoted	↓ Relegated

== Stadium ==
Bahlinger SC plays its home matches in the Kaiserstuhlstadion (capacity 5,000).
