= South Baden Cup =

German regional football competition

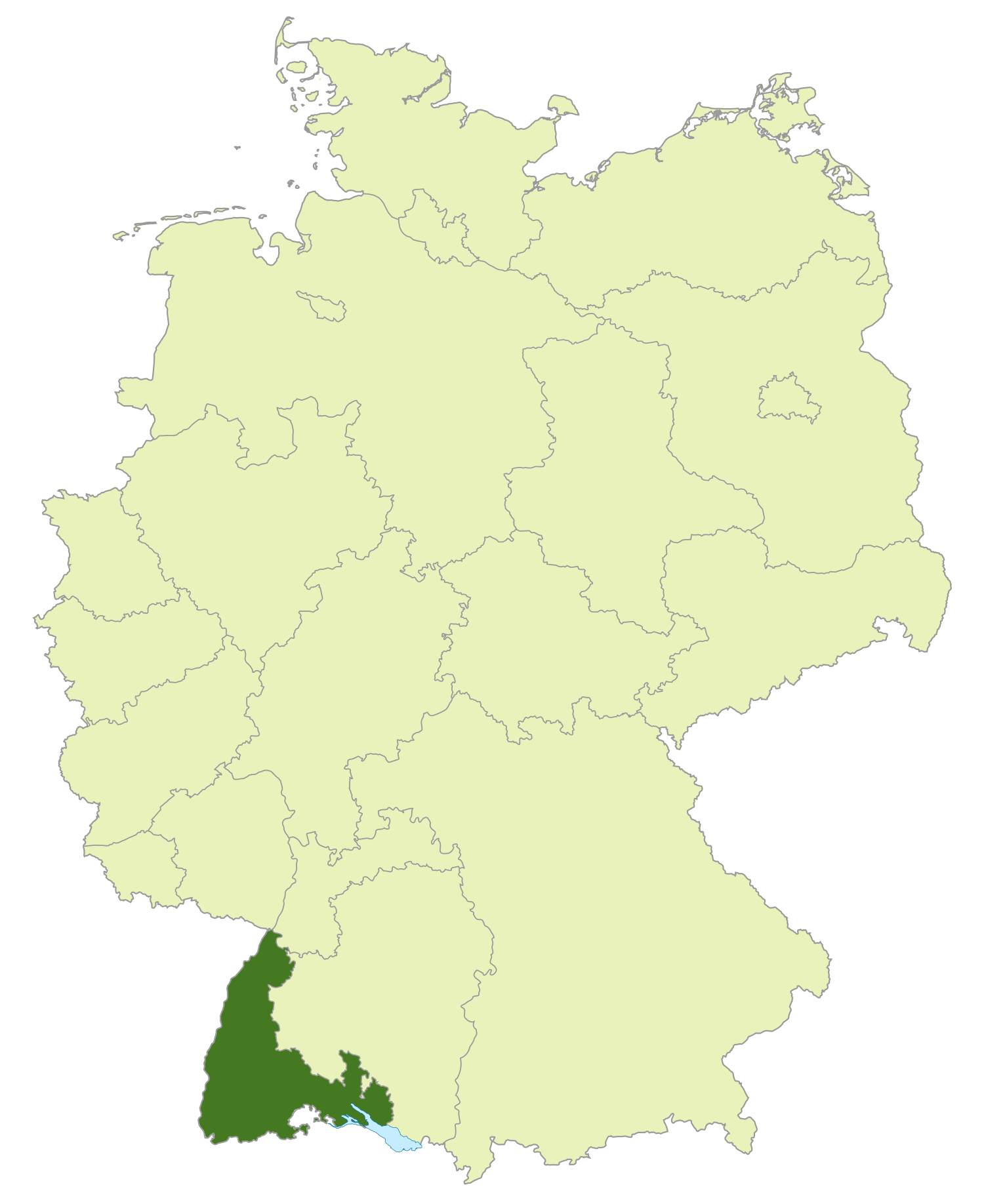
- Founded: 1945
- Region: Baden-Württemberg, Germany
- Qualifier for: DFB-Pokal
- Current champions: Bahlinger SC (2025–26)
- Most championships: FC 08 Villingen (11 titles)

The South Baden Cup (German: Südbadischer Pokal) is one of the 21 regional cup competitions of German football. The winner of the competition gains entry to the first round of the German Cup.

== History ==
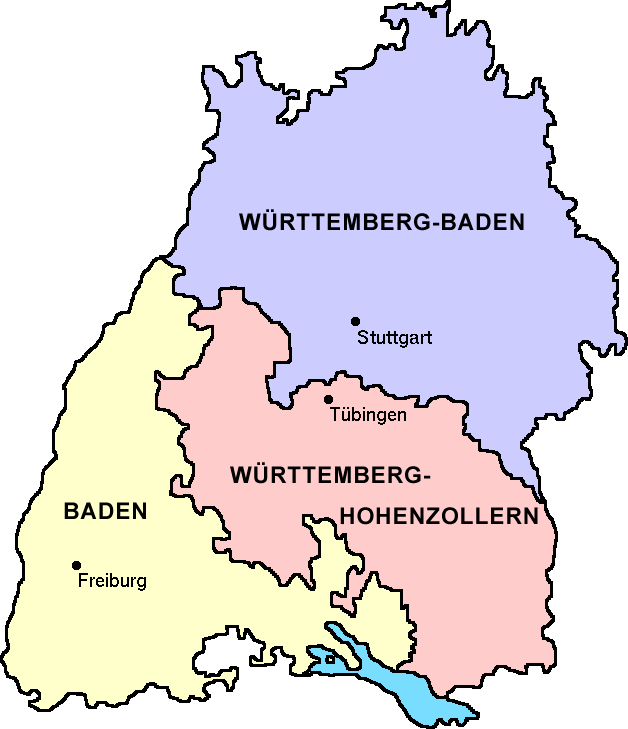
The three states that merged to form Baden-Württemberg in 1952

The Cup was established in 1945, after the end of the Second World War, in the French occupation zone in the southern half of the state of Baden, which existed as the state of South Baden from 1945 to 1952, when the state of Baden-Württemberg was formed. Due to the northern half of the state being under US occupation, the Baden football association was cut in half and a northern and southern federation was formed. The same happened with the regional cup competition.

The South Baden Cup is played annually, with the exception of 1946–47, 1951–56 and 1957–58, when it was not held.

From 1974 onwards, the winner of the South Baden Cup qualified for the first round of the German Cup.

The cup was sponsored for some years by the mineral water bottler Peterstaler and carried its name, Peterstaler Pokal, but the current sponsor is brewery Rothaus, and the competition is the therefore named Rothaus Pokal.

== Modus ==
Professional clubs are not permitted to enter the competition, meaning, no teams from the Bundesliga and the 2. Bundesliga can compete. The only club from the region affected by this in the past years has been the first team of the SC Freiburg.

All clubs from South Baden playing in the 3. Liga (III), Regionalliga Süd (IV) and Oberliga Baden-Württemberg (V) gain direct entry to the first round. Additionally, according to a quota system, the best eight clubs from the Verbandsliga Südbaden (VI) and the three Landesligas (VII) also enter the first round directly. The four semi-finalists of the six regional cup competitions in South Baden also qualify for the competition. Should more clubs be required to make up the number of 64 set for the first round, they will be selected from the Verbandsliga.

In case of a draw, the lower-tier club advances.

== Cup finals ==
Held annually at the end of season, these were the cup finals since 1945:

Season	Location	Winner	Finalist	Result	Attendance
1945–46		**SV Rastatt** ^{1}			
1946–47	not held				
1947–48		**Eintracht Singen** ^{2}	Offenburger FV		
1948–49		**VfL Konstanz** ^{3}			
1949–50		**FC 08 Villingen**			
1950–51		**Freiburger FC**			
1951–56	not held				
1956–57		**Kehler FV**			
1957–58	not held				
1958–59		**VfB Bühl**	Offenburger FV		
1959–60		**SV Oberkirch**			
1960–61		**Offenburger FV**			
1961–62		**FC Konstanz/VfR 1900**			
1962–63		**SV Oberkirch**			
1963–64		**FC Konstanz/VfR 1900**			
1964–65		**FC Konstanz/VfR 1900**			
1965–66		**FC Emmendingen**			
1966–67		**Offenburger FV**			
1967–68		**FC Singen 04**			
1968–69		**FV Lörrach**			
1969–70		**FC Furtwangen**			
1970–71		**FC Singen 04**	FC Emmendingen		
1971–72		**SV Waldkirch**	Offenburger FV		
1972–73		**FC Rastatt 04**			
1973–74		**FC 08 Villingen**			
1974–75		**SC Freiburg**			
1975–76		**FC 08 Villingen**			
1976–77		**FC Rastatt 04**			
1977–78		**SC Freiburg**	Offenburger FV		
1978–79		**FC 08 Villingen**			
1979–80		**VfB Gaggenau**			
1980–81		**FC Rastatt 04**	Offenburger FV		
1981–82		**Offenburger FV**			
1982–83		**SC Pfullendorf**			
1983–84		**FC Rastatt 04**			
1984–85		**SV Weil**	Offenburger FV		
1985–86		**FC Emmendingen**			
1986–87		**Offenburger FV**			
1987–88		**FC Emmendingen**	Offenburger FV		
1988–89		**VfB Gaggenau**			
1989–90		**SC Pfullendorf**			
1990–91		**Freiburger FC**			
1991–92		**Freiburger FC**			
1992–93		**VfB Gaggenau**			
1993–94		**SV Linx**			
1994–95		**VfB Gaggenau**			
1995–96		**FV Donaueschingen**	SV Oberachern		
1996–97	Waldkirch, 8 May 1997	**FC Singen 04**	SV Oberkirch	2–1	
1997–98		**FC Denzlingen**	FC Emmendingen		
1998–99		**FC Singen 04**			
1999–2000	Denzlingen, 31 May 2000	**FC Teningen**	FC Emmendingen	4–1 aet	
2000–01	Bötzingen, 30 May 2001	**SC Freiburg II**	FC Teningen	3–2	1,200
2001–02	Teningen, 5 June 2002	**Bahlinger SC**	FC Rastatt 04	1–0	1,000
2002–03	Herbolzheim, 12 June 2003	**FC Emmendingen**	Bahlinger SC	2–1	1,500
2003–04	Endingen, 4 May 2004	**FC Teningen**	FC Emmendingen	3–0	2,000
2004–05	25 May 2005	**FC 08 Villingen**	SC Freiburg II	2–2 / 3–1 after pen.	
2005–06	Villingen, 31 May 2006	**SC Pfullendorf**	FC Denzlingen	2–0	280
2006–07	Singen, 7 June 2007	**FC 08 Villingen**	SC Pfullendorf	2–0	3,412
2007–08	Radolfzell, 4 June 2008	**SC Pfullendorf**	FC 08 Villingen	9–8 after pen.	
2008–09	Bahlingen, 11 June 2009	**FC 08 Villingen**	Offenburger FV	3–1	
2009–10	Kirchzarten, 25 May 2010	**SC Pfullendorf**	SV Linx	1–0	600
2010–11	1 June 2011	**FC Teningen**	SV Weil	1–0	
2011–12	Kehl, 1 June 2012	**Offenburger FV**	SV Linx	2–0	
2012–13	Tiengen, 29 May 2013	**Bahlinger SC**	FC Radolfzell	3–1	
2013–14	Freiburg, 14 May 2014	**SV Waldkirch**	FC Bötzingen	4–0	3,050
2014–15	Emmendingen, 20 May 2015	**Bahlinger SC**	Freiburger FC	3–0	3,500
2015–16	Offenburg, 28 May 2016	**FC 08 Villingen**	SV Oberachern	5–3	
2016–17	Villingen, 25 May 2017	**1. FC Rielasingen-Arlen**	VfR Hausen	6–1	
2017–18	Lahr, 21 May 2018	**SV Linx**	FC 08 Villingen	2–1	
2018–19	Lahr, 26 May 2019	**FC 08 Villingen**	1. FC Rielasingen-Arlen	3–1	3,085
2019–20	Freiburg, 22 August 2020	**1. FC Rielasingen-Arlen**	SV Oberachern	3–0	0
2020–21	Bahlingen, 27 June 2021	**FC 08 Villingen**	Freiburger FC	5–1	0
2021–22	Lahr, 21 May 2022	**SV Oberachern**	DJK Donaueschingen	2–0	
2022–23	Emmendingen, 3 June 2023	**SV Oberachern**	FC 08 Villingen	3–0	
2023–24	Freiburg, 25 May 2024	**FC 08 Villingen**	SC Lahr	1–0	
2024–25	Freiburg, 24 May 2025	**Bahlinger SC**	FC Auggen	0–0 (a.e.t.) (5–3 p)	
2025–26	Offenburg, 23 May 2026	**Bahlinger SC**	FC 08 Villingen	1–0	

- Source: "Südbadische Pokalsieger der Herren (Peterstaler Pokal)" (in German). SBFV.
- Winners in **bold**
- ^{1} Now FC Rastat 04
- ^{2} Now FC Singen 04
- ^{3} Now FC Konstanz

== Winners ==
Listed in order of wins, the Cup winners are:

Club	Wins
FC 08 Villingen	11
Offenburger FV	5
SC Pfullendorf	5
FC Rastatt 04	5
FC Singen 04	5
Bahlinger SC	5
FC Konstanz	4
VfB Gaggenau	4
FC Emmendingen	4
FC Teningen	3
Freiburger FC	3
SC Freiburg ^{1}	3
SV Waldkirch	2
SV Oberkirch	2
SV Linx	2
1. FC Rielasingen-Arlen	2
SV Oberachern	2
Kehler FV	1
VfB Bühl	1
FV Lörrach	1
FC Furtwangen	1
SV Weil	1
FV Donaueschingen	1
FC Denzlingen	1

- ^{1} Includes one win by the club's reserve team, SC Freiburg II.
