= List of clubs in the Verbandsliga Baden =

This is a List of clubs in the Verbandsliga Baden, including all clubs and their final placings from the inaugural 1978–79 season to the current one. The league is the highest football league in the northern part of the Baden region of Baden-Württemberg. It is one of 35 leagues at the sixth tier of the German football league system. Until the introduction of the 3. Liga in 2008 it was the fifth tier of the league system, until the introduction of the Regionalligas in 1994 the fourth tier.

== Overview ==
The league was formed in 1978 to replace the league that existed in its place until then, the Amateurliga Nordbaden, as the third tier in Baden-Württemberg. At the same time, the Amateur-Oberliga Baden-Württemberg was formed above it.

=== League timeline ===
The league went through the following timeline of name changes, format and position in the league system:

Years	Name	Tier	Promotion to
1978–94	Verbandsliga Baden	IV	Amateur-Oberliga Baden-Württemberg
1994–2008	Verbandsliga Baden	V	Oberliga Baden-Württemberg
2008–	Verbandsliga Baden	VI	Oberliga Baden-Württemberg

== League placings ==
The complete list of clubs in the league and their league placings.

=== 1978–1994 ===
The complete list of clubs and placings in the league while operating as a tier four league from 1978 to 1994:

Club	S	79	80	81	82	83	84	85	86	87	88	89	90	91	92	93	94
VfR Pforzheim ^{1} ^{5}	12	7	8	3	7	9	10	5	12	15			8	6	1	14	5
1. FC Pforzheim ^{5}	11	17	4	10	5	3	6	1	3	7	9	2	3	2	13	8	10
ASV Durlach	20											3	5	10	5	1	15
Karlsruher SC II	8	15			4	1	13	16	3	3	4	1	1	8	3	16	1
Amicitia Viernheim ^{6}	16								10	1	15	2	15	4	7	3	2
SGK Heidelberg	27			2	3	7	1	9	7	11	8	16	3	2	2	5	3
FC Viktoria Bammental	10																4
FV Lauda	20		2	1	10	14	16	2	15	18	3	4	2	3	3	2	5
SV Schwetzingen	29	8	9	13	2	16	3	6	1	13	13	3	4	4	7	15	6
FV 09 Weinheim ^{2}	7	4	4	3	16	2	12	13	11	6	1	8	10	10	16	4	7
VfB Leimen	15													1	17	7	8
Waldhof Mannheim II	24									8	7	6	12	13	4	8	9
VfR Grötzingen	6															6	10
SG Oftersheim	11		7	6	11	15									9	9	11
TSV Viernheim ^{6}	14											5	9	11	11	11	12
Alemannia Wilferdingen	3																13
Viktoria Wertheim	14	13	16			16		8	6	12	14		7	5	16		14
SG Dielheim	10												11	8	10	12	15
SG Hemsbach	2															10	16
Karlsruher FV	3														6	13	
1. FC Walldorf	11					11	7	11	9	4	8	7	10	7	12	14	
VfB Eppingen	24	1	2	20	17	5	2	4	8	13	6	9	1	18	8	15	
TSV Tauberbischofsheim	2									16						16	
FC Germania Forst	11										9	8	6	12	13		
SpVgg Neckarelz	12	2	17												14		
FC Wiesental	6									11	2	10	4	9	15		
FC Mosbach	6								5	5	11	15		14			
FV Liedolsheim	1													15			
TSV Reichenbach	20			5	10	12	8	7	13	6	12	12	13	16			
FC Germania Friedrichstal	25	10	11	12	12	6	5	3	4	9	10	13	14				
FC Neureut	14							12	11	7	13	11	15				
VfL Neckarau	12	3	14	7	13	4	4	9	2	2	1	18	16				
ASV Feudenheim	2										5	14					
SV Königshofen	1											16					
VfB Wiesloch	4							14	7	10	15						
SV Waldhausen	1										16						
SV Sinsheim	15	4	3	4	6	8	9	10	14	14							
VfB Knielingen	7	6	5	14		10	11	13	15								
Fvgg Weingarten	7	5	13	9	16		13		16								
FC Oestringen	7		10	11	8	14	12	15									
SV Neckargerach	3	16	1	15	1	8	18	16									
FV Ladenburg	3				9	13	14										
FV Laudenberg	2			15			15										
SV Neckargmünd	1						16										
Alemannia Eggstein	4	11	6	8	14												
SV Distelhausen	1				15												
FV Hockenheim	3	12	12	16													
VfB Bretten	3	9	15														
Germania Mönchzell	1	14															
SV Osterburken	1	16															

=== 1994–present ===
The complete list of clubs and placings in the league while operating as the tier five (1994–2008) and six (2008–present) league:

Club	S	95	96	97	98	99	00	01	02	03	04	05	06	07	08	09	10	11	12	13	14	15	16	17	18	19	20	21	22	23
TSG Hoffenheim	4			9	3	2	1	1	13	5	5	7	4	2	2	7	11	11	11	16	9	8	15	4	3	9	6	11	9	x
TSG Hoffenheim II	2								2	2	10	8	6	8	5	2	1	5	7	9	10	9	3	4	6	10	9	16	13	x
FC Astoria Walldorf	6								6	3	4	8	5	1	8	4	2	8	7	2	1	8	11	11	11	13	5	18	10	x
FC Nöttingen	5				11	12	12	6	1	8	1	18	9	14	11	5	9	2	6	4	3	15	2	19	5	4	12	5	7	x
1. CfR Pforzheim ^{5}	5																	7	12	4	7	2	5	8	13	11	13	11	5	x
1. FC Bruchsal	10																	9	10	1	17	6	8	4	4	6	2	14	18	x
FC Astoria Walldorf II	9																11	5	4	6	2	3	1	15	17	5	1	19	16	x
SV Sandhausen II^{9}	6															15		14		12	5	1	10	11	16	2	18	21		
ATSV Mutschelbach	4																									4	3	3	1	x
SV Spielberg	19	5	6	8	7	3	9	12	12	6	9	3	4	7	6	1	15	1	14	15	16	1	16	10	14	18	5	1	2	x
VfR Mannheim ^{3}	10	8	2	7	14	10	3	8	9		1	12	10	15	16	16	4	2	2	3	15	17	3	3	3	9	8	10	3	x
VfB Eppingen	24				9	6	13	14					10	15							14			9	5	8	7	4	4	x
Fortuna Heddesheim	6																							2	2	3	4	2	5	x
Waldhof Mannheim II ^{4}	24	9	7	2	8	10	2	2	6	10							5	12	7	11	8	13					12	6	6	x
FC Zuzenhausen	15												8	3	5	3	7	10	9	14			10	8	10	10	13	8	7	x
TSG Weinheim ^{2}	22	6	10	7	5	1	15	1	16	1	18	6	3	2	4	2	5	16	2	5	11	5	2	1	18	11	14	7	8	x
1. FC Mühlhausen	2																											5	9	x
Olympia Kirrlach	5																								9	7	10	12	10	x
VfR Gommersdorf	7							15													15		13		16		15	9	11	x
FC Germania Friedrichstal	25													10	13	7	2	4	8	7	3	12	17	5	1	16	11	16	12	x
SV Langensteinbach	2																											11	13	x
SpVgg Neckarelz	12											17		14	9	4	1	4	3	1	9	12	17	18	13		9	13	14	
FV Fortuna Kirchfeld	3																										16	14	15	
SpVgg Durlach-Aue	9															13						7	9	6	6	13	17	15	16	
TSV 1887 Wieblingen	2																									12	18			
VfB Gartenstadt ^{8}	3																								8	1	6			
TuS Bilfingen	3																							10	12	14				
SV Schwetzingen	30	4	11	4	12	4	3	4	4	15				13	11	6	8	8	3	2	6	8	7	11	7	15				
FC 07 Heidelsheim	9														7	9	3	3	11	10	13	14				16				
FV Lauda	21	2	3	1	12	4	2	5	10	6	13	13	17	8	14	8	12	15					5	14		17				
SGK Heidelberg	28	3	2	13	1	8	3	15	8	7	8	11	7	12	10	5	13			9	10	9	11	12	11	18				
FC Español Karlsruhe	1																								14					
ASV Durlach	20	14	12	15	2	7	6	7	3	4	11	1	16	6	1	14	14	18	5	13			6	7	15					
TSV Reichenbach	20											9	6	9	16					8	4	10	12	13						
Amicitia Viernheim ^{6}	16	15	16	14											2	12	9	11	13			4	4	15						
TSV Strümpfelbrunn	1																							16						
FC Spöck	5																		6	3	9	11	14							
TSV Höpfingen	3																			15		12	15							
SV Kickers Pforzheim	2																				1	18	16							
SpVgg Neckarelz II	2																				12	15								
TSV Grunbach ^{7}	1																		1	13	2									
TSV Buchen	2															16			14											
DJK/FC Ziegelhausen/Peterstal	1																		15											
1. FC Birkenfeld	4												11	17				6	16											
FC Mosbach	6																	13												
1. FC Pforzheim^{5}	11	8	3	2	5	3	7	2	3	12	19	4	1	16	3	10	6													
TV Hardheim	11		14		4	15			11	8	10	5	9	11	15		10													
FC Germania Forst	11					11	10	5	13	13							14													
FC Rot	4													5	12	11	15													
SpVgg Oberhausen	7									5	3	2	2	4	8	14														
SV Schollbrunn	4						15			14		14			17															
FC Neureut	14						7	8	9	10	7	13	12	16																
TSV Viernheim ^{6}	14	12	9	10	15		16				12	10	13																	
FC Viktoria Bammental	10	1	10	11	16	5	5	11	10	11	5	7	14																	
VfB Leimen	15	11	4	3	6	8	4	3	5	9	2	12	15																	
SV Schefflenz	1												16																	
SV Seckenheim	2										6	15																		
SpVgg Ketsch	3							10	15			16																		
VfR Ittersbach	6			5	10	13	11	16			13																			
Viktoria Wertheim	14			12	16						14																			
SV Sinsheim	15					9	8	9	7	12	15																			
SV Laudenbach	1									16																				
SpVgg Heidelsheim	1								14																					
FC Oestringen	7							13																						
SG Dielheim	10		8	13	14	14	14																							
SG Oftersheim	11	7	1	16	13	16																								
VfR Grötzingen	6	8	12	11	17																									
FV 09 Weinheim ^{2}	7	10	5	6	18																									
Spfr. Dossenheim	1			15																										
Alemannia Wilferdingen	3	13	13																											
Fvgg Weingarten	7		15																											
Karlsruher FV	3	14																												
VfR Ussingheim	1	15																												
VfB Bretten	3																													x
Türkspor Mosbach	1																													x
VfL Neckarau	12																													x

=== Key ===
Color	Key
1, 2, 3, ...	Bundesliga
1, 2, 3, ...	2. Bundesliga
1, 2, 3, ...	3. Liga
1, 2, 3, ...	Regionalliga Süd (1994–2012); Regionalliga Südwest (2012–present)
1, 2, 3, ...	Oberliga Baden-Württemberg
1, 2, 3, ...	Verbandsliga Baden
1	League champions
	Played at a league level below this league

- S = No. of seasons in league (as of 2022–23)

=== Notes ===
- ^{1} In 1995, VfR Pforzheim withdrew from the Oberliga.
- ^{2} In 1998, FV 09 Weinheim joined TSG Weinheim.
- ^{3} In 2002, VfR Mannheim withdrew to the Landesliga.
- ^{4} In 2003, Waldhof Mannheim II withdrew from the Oberliga.
- ^{5} In 2010, 1. FC Pforzheim merged with VfR Pforzheim to form 1. CfR Pforzheim.
- ^{6} In 2008, SpVgg Amicitia Viernheim merged with TSV Viernheim to form TSV Amicitia Viernheim and in 2017, Amiticia withdrew from the Verbandsliga.
- ^{7} In 2014, TSV Grunbach withdrew from the Oberliga.
- ^{8} In 2020, VfB Gartenstadt withdrew from the Verbandsliga.
- ^{9} In 2021, SV Sandhausen II withdrew from the Oberliga.
