= List of Bundesliga clubs eliminated from the DFB-Pokal by amateur sides =

This is a list of Bundesliga clubs eliminated from the DFB-Pokal by amateur sides. The DFB, the German football association, lists all leagues below the 3. Liga or, until 2008, the 2. Bundesliga, as amateur. Listed are losses of Bundesliga sides, not including the 2. Bundesliga, against teams from the third division (fourth division from 2008) and below.

Originally, the German Cup, the DFB-Pokal, was a competition open to clubs from the top divisions of German football only. This continued after the establishment of the Bundesliga in 1963. Semi-professional and amateur clubs could only enter the competition from 1974 onwards, when it was enlarged. Up until 2008, only the top two divisions of German football, the Bundesliga and 2. Bundesliga, were fully professional. From 2008, with the establishment of the 3. Liga, the third tier also became fully professional.

From the first encounters in 1974–75, the new match ups Bundesliga versus amateurs, most usually third division clubs, became a source of surprising results over the years. Commonly titled the "mother of all cup sensations" (German: Die Mutter aller Pokalsensationen), was Hamburger SV's second round loss to VfB Eppingen in 1974, the first instant of an amateur side knocking out a Bundesliga club. It took until 1990 for a fourth division side to achieve the same, when SpVgg Fürth took Borussia Dortmund out of the competition. Further milestones were the reserve side of Hertha BSC, Hertha BSC Amateure, reaching the cup final in 1993, a first for a third division club and a reserve team. Eintracht Trier, in 1997, overcame both the current UEFA Cup and Champions League winners at the time, knocking Schalke 04 and Borussia Dortmund out of the competition. In 2000, 1. FC Magdeburg became the first fourth division side to eliminate two Bundesliga clubs in one season.

Surprise results in the cup attract a strong media coverage in Germany and, at times, abroad. When TSV Vestenbergsgreuth took out Bayern Munich, coached by Giovanni Trapattoni at the time, La Gazzetta dello Sport reported on its front page "Club di dilettanti elimina Trapattoni" ("Amateur club eliminates Trapattoni"). Historical cup defeats, especially of the bigger names like Bayern Munich, are often brought up again in the German press in August each year, when Bundesliga sides travel to meet their amateur opposition once more in the first cup round.

== Milestones ==
Commonly titled the "mother of all cup sensations" is Hamburger SV's second-round game against third division Amateurliga Nordbaden side VfB Eppingen in 1974. Hamburg came to Eppingen sitting in top spot of the Bundesliga, having defeated Steagul Roșu Brașov 8–0 in the UEFA Cup. Possibly underestimating the amateur side, Hamburg was knocked out 2–1, courtesy of two goals by Gerd Störzer. Eppingen continued its cup run to the fourth round, where it lost to Werder Bremen.

Hertha BSC was humiliated at home when it lost to amateurs TuS Langerwehe in the third round in 1980, after having drawn the first game at home and forced to a replay away. Under the current cup modus such a result can not occur again because, since the mid-1980s, amateur clubs enjoy automatic home advantage when facing a club from the top two leagues in Germany.

Ten years after Eppingen, Hamburg once more fell to an amateur side, when SC Geislingen of the Amateur-Oberliga Baden-Württemberg defeated the club 2–0 in the first round of the 1984–85 edition. Geislingen went on to the third round, where they went out to eventual winners Bayer Uerdingen. Uerdingen itself went on to a surprise cup win when the club defeated favourites Bayern Munich in the final that season.

Bayern Munich experienced a number of cup surprises in the 1990s, starting in the first round of the 1990–91 competition, where they had to travel to FV Weinheim, also of the Amateur-Oberliga Baden-Württemberg. Bayern, with six players from the 1990 German FIFA World Cup winning side, lost 1–0 and was knocked out in the first round of the German Cup for the first time in the club's history. Much less noted was fourth division side SpVgg Fürth's 3–1 victory over Borussia Dortmund, despite it being the first occasion that a Bundesliga side lost to a fourth division side in the cup.

In the 1992–93 edition, third division NOFV-Oberliga Mitte side Hertha BSC Amateure, the reserve team of Hertha BSC, did what no third division or reserve side had done before, reaching the German Cup final. The team lost 1–0 to Bayer Leverkusen in the end and greatly benefited from a draw that only saw it encounter one other Bundesliga side, 1. FC Nürnberg, which it defeated 2–1. The club also had to dispose of the defending champions, the surprise 1991–92 winner Hannover 96 of the 2. Bundesliga.

Bayern's cup trouble continued in the following years. Not an amateur side, 2. Bundesliga club FC Homburg nevertheless produced a shock result when it beat Bayern Munich in Munich in 1991, winning 4–2 after extra time. Bayern produced another surprise in 1994, when it went out in the first round to village club TSV Vestenbergsgreuth, losing 1–0. In the same season, Bayern's reserve side knocked out two Bundesliga clubs, Werder Bremen and VfB Stuttgart. On 13 January 2021, Bayern lost to second-division Holstein Kiel 2-2 (PSO 6-5) in another shocking defeat.

In 1995, 1. FC Köln lost on penalties to SpVgg Beckum, after a nil-all draw after regular time. The Cologne club thereby became only the second side in the history of the German Cup to go out as a Bundesliga club to a fourth division team. Regionalliga Süd club SV Sandhausen, having fallen behind twice in its game against VfB Stuttgart, nevertheless was able to force a draw after extra time, followed by a lengthy penalty shoot-out, which Sandhausen eventually won 15–14.

The Regionalliga club Energie Cottbus in 1996–97 became the second third division side to reach the cup final, when it knocked out Bundesliga teams MSV Duisburg, FC St. Pauli and Karlsruher SC to lose 2–0 to VfB Stuttgart in the final.

In 1997–98, Eintracht Trier of the tier three Regionalliga West/Südwest wrote German Cup history when the club knocked both Schalke 04 and Borussia Dortmund out of the cup in the space of six weeks. Schalke had won the UEFA Cup the previous year, while Dortmund had won the Champions League. Trier disposed of both, winning 1–0 and 2–1, and went all the way to the semi-finals before going out to MSV Duisburg on penalties.

In the 2000–01 edition, 1. FC Magdeburg, former European Cup Winners' Cup winners, were on an outstanding season in the tier four NOFV-Oberliga Süd, taking out the league title scoring 120 goals. In the cup, the club did what no fourth division side had done before, defeating two Bundesliga sides in the same edition. The club disposed of 1. FC Köln with a 5–2 victory before taking on Bayern Munich in the second round. After a 1–1 at the end of regular time, Magdeburg defeated Bayern 4–2 on penalties. 1. FCM went on to the fourth round, where it was stopped by Schalke 04 while Bayern won the Champions League that season. Even more successful was Union Berlin of the Regionalliga Nord that season, who reached the final of the German Cup. Union knocked out Bundesliga sides VfL Bochum and Borussia Mönchengladbach in the process before losing to Schalke 04 in the final. It also qualified for the UEFA Cup since Schalke was already qualified for the Champions League. The reserve side of VfB Stuttgart, VfB Stuttgart Amateure, added to the number of surprise results in the 2000–01 German Cup season when it set a new record score for a third division side against Bundesliga teams, defeating Eintracht Frankfurt 6–1. The team was then knocked out by its own first team in the second round, with two of the best players in the 6–1 victory then fielding for the first team against the seconds, Alexander Hleb and Ioannis Amanatidis.

Hamburger SV was once more the victim of a third division side in 2004, when it lost 4–2 to Regionalliga Nord team SC Paderborn. The game in which Hamburg lead 2–0 before half time was decided by referee Robert Hoyzer, who awarded two penalties to Paderborn and send off Hamburg player Émile Mpenza. Only later was it discovered that this surprise result was caused by match fixing in which Hoyzer was involved.

In 2005–06, HSV's local rival, FC St. Pauli, having dropped to the tier three Regionalliga, knocked out a number of professional sides, among them Bundesliga teams Hertha BSC and Werder Bremen with 4–3 and 3–1 victories. The club was only stopped in the semi-finals, when Bayern Munich proved too strong and won 3–0.

In 2006–07, Hamburger SV once more fell victim to a third division side, when Stuttgarter Kickers defeated the HSV 4–3 after extra time.

Rot-Weiss Essen and Energie Cottbus were to encounter each other in the first round in three consecutive seasons from 2005–06 to 2007–08. Energie won the first, Rot-Weiss the second and third. Only the latest however could be counted as a true Cup upset, because at this stage Essen had fallen to Regionalliga level while Cottbus had advanced to the Bundesliga.

In the 2012–13 season, Berliner AK set a new scoring record for a fourth division side against a Bundesliga team when it defeated 1899 Hoffenheim 4–0 in the opening round.

During the 2019–20 season, 1. FC Saarbrücken of the Regionalliga Südwest became the first fourth-division club in the history of the DFB-Pokal to reach the semi-finals, eliminating Bundesliga sides 1. FC Köln and Fortuna Düsseldorf along the way.

== List of games ==
This is a list of games in which Bundesliga sides were knocked out by clubs from the amateur leagues. The list covers the era from 1974, when amateur clubs started entering the competition, and lists losses of Bundesliga sides against teams from the third division and below until 2008. From 2008, it lists losses against fourth division sides and below as, at that time, the third division became fully professional.

Season	Round	Date	Home	Away	Result	Attendance
1974–75	Second round	26 October 1974	VfB Eppingen	Hamburger SV	2–1	15,000
1978–79	Third round	2 December 1978	Südwest Ludwigshafen	1. FC Kaiserslautern	2–1	17,000
1979–80	Third round	29 January 1980	TuS Langerwehe	Hertha BSC	2–1	14,000
1981–82	First round	29 August 1981	Wuppertaler SV	Eintracht Braunschweig	1–0	13,500
1983–84	First round	28 August 1983	Göttingen 05	Eintracht Frankfurt	4–2	8,000
1983–84	Third round	14 January 1984	1. FC Bocholt	Eintracht Braunschweig	3–1 (a.e.t.)	7,000
1984–85	First round	1 September 1984	SC Geislingen	Hamburger SV	2–0	7,000
1984–85	Second round	21 November 1984	Eintracht Haiger	Karlsruher SC	1–0 (a.e.t.)	4,000
1986–87	First round	30 August 1986	Mainz 05	Schalke 04	1–0	5,500
1986–87	First round	31 August 1986	BVL Remscheid	1. FC Kaiserslautern	3–0	6,000
1987–88	First round	29 August 1987	VfL Wolfsburg	Hannover 96	3–0	7,200
1987–88	Second round	24 October 1987	Viktoria Aschaffenburg	1. FC Köln	1–0	12,000
1989–90	First round	18 August 1989	Arminia Hannover	FC Homburg	2–1	1,900
1989–90	First round	18 August 1989	Kickers Offenbach	Bayer Uerdingen	2–1	6,000
1989–90	Second round	23 September 1989	1. FC Pforzheim	VfL Bochum	1–0	5,200
1989–90	Third round	10 November 1989	Kickers Offenbach	Borussia Mönchengladbach	1–0 (a.e.t.)	28,000
1990–91	First round	4 August 1990	FV Weinheim	Bayern Munich	1–0	10,000
1990–91	First round	4 August 1990	SpVgg Fürth	Borussia Dortmund	3–1	3,800
1991–92	Second round	17 August 1991	TSV Havelse	1. FC Nürnberg	1–1 (a.e.t.) (4–2 p)	3,500
1992–93	Second round	13 September 1992	Rot-Weiss Essen	Schalke 04	2–0	19,300
1992–93	Quarter-finals	1 December 1992	Hertha BSC Amateure	1. FC Nürnberg	2–1	13,700
1993–94	Third round	11 September 1993	Bayern Munich Amateure	1. FC Köln	0–0 (a.e.t.) (5–4 p)	3,000
1994–95	First round	13 August 1994	Stuttgarter Kickers	SC Freiburg	3–1	3,600
1994–95	First round	13 August 1994	Bayern Munich Amateure	Werder Bremen	2–1	2,200
1994–95	First round	14 August 1994	TSV Vestenbergsgreuth	Bayern Munich	1–0	24,200
1994–95	Third round	8 November 1994	Bayern Munich Amateure	VfB Stuttgart	2–2 (a.e.t.) (7–6 p)	3,500
1995–96	First round	25 August 1995	FC Homburg	FC St. Pauli	2–1 (a.e.t.)	3,000
1995–96	First round	26 August 1995	SpVgg Beckum	1. FC Köln	0–0 (a.e.t.) (4–3 p)	7,000
1995–96	First round	27 August 1995	SV Sandhausen	VfB Stuttgart	2–2 (a.e.t.) (15–14 p)	5,200
1995–96	Third round	3 October 1995	FC Homburg	1860 Munich	2–1	8,000
1996–97	First round	11 August 1996	SG Wattenscheid	Borussia Dortmund	4–3 (a.e.t.)	9,600
1996–97	Third round	23 October 1996	Energie Cottbus	MSV Duisburg	2–2 (a.e.t.) (7–6 p)	8,000
1996–97	Quarter-finals	12 November 1996	Energie Cottbus	FC St. Pauli	0–0 (a.e.t.) (5–4 p)	12,400
1996–97	Semi-finals	15 April 1997	Energie Cottbus	Karlsruher SC	3–0	21,000
1997–98	First round	15 August 1997	SSV Ulm	1. FC Köln	3–1	11,000
1997–98	First round	15 August 1997	Hannover 96	Borussia Mönchengladbach	1–1 (a.e.t.) (6–4 p)	33,400
1997–98	Second round	23 September 1997	Eintracht Trier	Schalke 04	1–0	16,500
1997–98	Second round	24 September 1997	Hannover 96	1860 Munich	2–1	36,000
1997–98	Third round	28 October 1997	Eintracht Trier	Borussia Dortmund	2–1	17,900
1998–99	Second round	23 September 1998	Sportfreunde Siegen	SC Freiburg	1–0	10,800
1999–2000	Second round	7 August 1999	SV Babelsberg	SpVgg Unterhaching	1–0	3,000
1999–2000	Third round	13 October 1999	Eintracht Trier	1860 Munich	2–1	13,000
2000–01	First round	26 August 2000	VfB Stuttgart Amateure	Eintracht Frankfurt	6–1	1,700
2000–01	First round	27 August 2000	1. FC Magdeburg	1. FC Köln	5–2	8,000
2000–01	Second round	1 November 2000	1. FC Magdeburg	Bayern Munich	1–1 (a.e.t.) (4–2 p)	26,000
2000–01	Quarter-finals	20 December 2000	Union Berlin	VfL Bochum	1–0	11,000
2000–01	Semi finals	6 February 2001	Union Berlin	Borussia Mönchengladbach	2–2 (a.e.t.) (6–4 p)	18,100
2003–04	First round	30 August 2003	Eintracht Braunschweig	1. FC Kaiserslautern	4–1	18,000
2003–04	Second round	29 October 2003	Eintracht Braunschweig	Hannover 96	2–0	23,000
2004–05	First round	21 August 2004	SC Paderborn	Hamburger SV	4–2	7,000
2004–05	First round	22 August 2004	Bayern Munich Amateure	Borussia Mönchengladbach	1–1 (a.e.t.) (7–6 p)	4,000
2005–06	Third round	21 December 2005	FC St. Pauli	Hertha BSC	4–3 (a.e.t.)	19,800
2005–06	Quarter-finals	25 January 2006	FC St. Pauli	Werder Bremen	3–1	19,800
2006–07	First round	9 September 2006	Stuttgarter Kickers	Hamburger SV	4–3 (a.e.t.)	10,500
2006–07	First round	9 September 2006	FK Pirmasens	Werder Bremen	1–1 (a.e.t.) (5–3 p)	10,000
2006–07	First round	10 September 2006	SC Pfullendorf	Arminia Bielefeld	2–1	4,000
2006–07	First round	10 September 2006	1. FC Saarbrücken	Mainz 05	1–0	15,200
2006–07	Second round	25 October 2006	VfL Osnabrück	Borussia Mönchengladbach	2–1	18,500
2007–08	First round	4 August 2007	Rot-Weiss Essen	Energie Cottbus	2–2 (a.e.t.) (8–7 p)	8,400
2007–08	Second round	30 October 2007	Wuppertaler SV	Hertha BSC	2–0	12,400
2010–11	Second round	14 August 2010	SV Elversberg	Hannover 96	0–0 (a.e.t.) (5–4 p)	2,700
2010–11	Second round	14 August 2010	Chemnitzer FC	FC St. Pauli	1–0	10,400
2011–12	First round	29 July 2011	RB Leipzig	VfL Wolfsburg	3–2	31,200
2011–12	Third round	21 December 2011	Holstein Kiel	Mainz 05	2–0	10,649
2012–13	First round	18 August 2012	Berliner AK	1899 Hoffenheim	4–0	1,468
2012–13	First round	19 August 2012	TSV Havelse	1. FC Nürnberg	3–2 (a.e.t.)	2,500
2014–15	First round	17 August 2014	1. FC Magdeburg	FC Augsburg	1–0	17,800
2015–16	First round	9 August 2015	SpVgg Unterhaching	FC Ingolstadt	2–1	6,500
2015–16	First round	9 August 2015	Carl Zeiss Jena	Hamburger SV	3–2 (a.e.t.)	13,800
2016–17	Second round	26 October 2016	Astoria Walldorf	Darmstadt 98	1–0	4,000
2018–19	First round	18 August 2018	SSV Ulm	Eintracht Frankfurt	2–1	18,440
2019–20	First round	10 August 2019	SC Verl	FC Augsburg	2–1	5,000
2019–20	Second round	29 October 2019	1. FC Saarbrücken	1. FC Köln	3–2	6,800
2019–20	Quarter-finals	3 March 2020	1. FC Saarbrücken	Fortuna Düsseldorf	1–1 (a.e.t.) (7–6 p)	6,800
2020–21	First round	14 September 2020	Rot-Weiss Essen	Arminia Bielefeld	1–0	300
2020–21	Third round	2 February 2021	Rot-Weiss Essen	Bayer Leverkusen	2–1 (a.e.t.)	0
2021–22	First round	7 August 2021	SV Babelsberg	Greuther Fürth	2–2 (a.e.t.) (5–4 p)	3,030
2021–22	First round	8 August 2021	Preußen Münster	VfL Wolfsburg	2–0 (awd)	6,703
2023–24	First round	14 August 2023	FC Homburg	Darmstadt 98	3–0	12,000

- Bundesliga clubs in **bold**.
- The Münster-Wolfsburg match originally ended 1–3 for Wolfsburg after extra time. Wolfsburg used a total of six substitutes, while only five were allowed, and were disqualified after a protest by Münster.
