= 1981–82 DFB-Pokal =

Tournament details
- Country: West Germany
- Teams: 128

Final positions
- Champions: Bayern Munich
- Runners-up: 1. FC Nürnberg

Tournament statistics
- Matches played: 137
- Top goal scorer: Karl-Heinz Rummenigge (7)

The 1981–82 DFB-Pokal was the 39th season of the annual German football cup competition. It began on 28 August 1981 and ended on 1 May 1982. In the final Bayern Munich defeated 1. FC Nürnberg 4–2. Bayern thus won the trophy for the sixth time. It was the last season, that the cup was held with 128 teams participating. Afterwards the competition was scaled down to 64 teams.

== Matches ==
=== First round ===
28 August 1981
Hertha BSC	5 – 1	Bayer Leverkusen II
VfB Stuttgart	5 – 0	FC Rastatt 04
VfL Osnabrück	5 – 0	VfB Bottrop
FC Bayern Munich	8 – 0	SC Jülich 1910
SV 1916 Sandhausen	3 – 6	Arminia Bielefeld
SpVgg Landshut	2 – 3	FV Hassia Bingen
TSV Nördlingen	0 – 3	VfB Oldenburg
SV Leiwen	3 – 2	SC Herford	(AET)
BFC Preußen Berlin	2 – 0	Schwarz-Weiß Essen
MSV Duisburg	2 – 1	1. FC Köln
SV Werder Bremen	1 – 0	1. FC Kaiserslautern
Stuttgarter Kickers	1 – 5	Hamburger SV
Karlsruher SC	3 – 0	SG Union Solingen
FC Grone 1910	0 – 4	Borussia Dortmund
VfL Bochum	3 – 2	1. FC Paderborn
Eintracht Frankfurt	6 – 1	BSC Brunsbüttel
SSV Dillenburg	2 – 7	Borussia Mönchengladbach
Fortuna Düsseldorf	10 – 1	SSV Überherrn
FC Eislingen	0 – 3	SV Darmstadt 98
1. FC Haßfurt	0 – 2	1. FC Nürnberg
Wuppertaler SV	1 – 0	Eintracht Braunschweig
Hannover 96	5 – 1	Kickers Offenbach
SpVgg Bayreuth	3 – 1	Bayer Uerdingen
FC Bayern Hof	0 – 2	SV Waldhof Mannheim
TuS Lörrach-Stetten	1 – 2	VfR Wormatia Worms
Freiburger FC	4 – 0	TuS Woltmershausen
Rot-Weiß Essen	2 – 0	OSV Hannover
1. FC Saarbrücken	0 – 0	Alemannia Aachen	(AET)
SV Rasensport Osnabrück	1 – 2	Fortuna Köln
FC Tailfingen	3 – 1	SV Ruchheim
ASC Dudweiler	0 – 0	FSV Salmrohr	(AET)
SV Neckargerach	4 – 2	Kickers Würzburg
FV 09 Weinheim	2 – 1	SpVgg 07 Ludwigsburg	(AET)
SC Urania Hamburg	6 – 4	VfL Hamm	(AET)
FC 08 Homburg	1 – 4	1. FC Kaiserslautern II
Eintracht Trier	2 – 1	FSV Frankfurt U23
FC St. Pauli	1 – 2	1. FC Bocholt	(AET)
Rendsburger TSV	1 – 1	Viktoria Köln	(AET)
SSV Ulm 1846	1 – 1	1. FC Nürnberg II	(AET)
Union Salzgitter	2 – 0	FC Augsburg
Borussia Neunkirchen	1 – 0	Preußen Münster
TuS Oberwinter	2 – 0	FC Rhade
Holstein Kiel	3 – 2	Hermania Kassel	(AET)
FV Offenburg	3 – 0	Reinickendorfer Füchse
TSV Röttenbach	1 – 3	SV Elversberg
SV Siegburg 04	0 – 1	FK Pirmasens
TSV 1860 München	2 – 0	SpVgg Fürth
TSV Marktl	0 – 4	SC Freiburg
VfB Eppingen	3 – 1	Hannover 96 II
Tennis Borussia Berlin	4 – 3	SG Post/Süd Regensburg
SpVgg Erkenschwick	0 – 3	Bayer 04 Leverkusen
SG Wattenscheid 09	2 – 0	TuS Iserlohn	(AET)
TuS Xanten	0 – 1	Göttingen 05
SC Viktoria Griesheim	8 – 2	Hamburger SV II
FC Gohfeld	2 – 1	FVgg 06 Kastel
Rot-Weiß Oberhausen	5 – 3	TuSpo Ziegenhain
FSV Frankfurt	2 – 0	Witten 07
TuS Celle	4 – 2	ESV Ingolstadt
Rot-Weiß Lüdenscheid	1 – 2	VfL Wolfsburg
1. FC Köln II	3 – 2	OSC Bremerhaven	(AET)
VfB Stuttgart II	4 – 0	VfL Klafeld
KSV Hessen Kassel	4 – 1	FC Schalke 04
SC Geislingen	1 – 1	VfR 1910 Bürstadt	(AET)
TSV Kappeln	1 – 6	Arminia Hannover

==== Replays ====
8 September 1981
Alemannia Aachen	2 – 1	1. FC Saarbrücken
FSV Salmrohr	3 – 1	ASC Dudweiler
Viktoria Köln	3 – 0	Rendsburger TSV
1. FC Nürnberg II	1 – 3	SSV Ulm 1846
VfR 1910 Bürstadt	4 – 0	SC Geislingen

=== Second round ===
11 October 1981
FC Bayern Munich	5 – 1	SV Neckargerach
MSV Duisburg	3 – 0	FK Pirmasens
Alemannia Aachen	2 – 1	SC Freiburg
Rot-Weiß Essen	4 – 1	SV Leiwen
Fortuna Düsseldorf	3 – 1	Eintracht Frankfurt
Arminia Bielefeld	0 – 1	1. FC Nürnberg
SV Darmstadt 98	4 – 1	FV Hassia Bingen
FSV Salmrohr	0 – 3	SV Werder Bremen
Hamburger SV	2 – 1	Eintracht Trier
Borussia Mönchengladbach	3 – 1	Arminia Hannover
Karlsruher SC	3 – 0	Wuppertaler SV
VfB Stuttgart	10 – 1	TuS Oberwinter
VfL Bochum	3 – 1	FC Tailfingen
SV Elversberg	1 – 4	Borussia Dortmund
SG Wattenscheid 09	2 – 2	Hannover 96	(AET)
KSV Hessen Kassel	1 – 0	Fortuna Köln	(AET)
TSV 1860 München	0 – 1	SV Waldhof Mannheim	(AET)
Freiburger FC	5 – 1	TuS Celle
FV 09 Weinheim	1 – 3	VfL Osnabrück
Hertha BSC	6 – 2	SC Viktoria Griesheim
Borussia Neunkirchen	1 – 2	VfR Wormatia Worms
Göttingen 05	1 – 0	Rot-Weiß Oberhausen	(AET)
VfB Eppingen	2 – 0	BFC Preußen Berlin
FSV Frankfurt	2 – 0	FC Gohfeld
SSV Ulm 1846	2 – 1	VfL Wolfsburg
1. FC Kaiserslautern II	1 – 3	Urania Hamburg
Viktoria Köln	1 – 1	VfR 1910 Bürstadt	(AET)
VfB Stuttgart II	1 – 2	SpVgg Bayreuth
Tennis Borussia Berlin	1 – 2	VfB Oldenburg
1. FC Bocholt	2 – 1	FV Offenburg
Holstein Kiel	3 – 2	Union Salzgitter
1. FC Köln II	3 – 3	Bayer 04 Leverkusen	(AET)

==== Replays ====
27 October 1981
Hannover 96	6 – 0	SG Wattenscheid 09
18 November 1981
VfR 1910 Bürstadt	1 – 0	Viktoria Köln	(AET)
Bayer 04 Leverkusen	5 – 0	1. FC Köln II

=== Third round ===
4 December 1981
Alemannia Aachen	0 – 3	Hamburger SV
Hannover 96	2 – 0	VfL Osnabrück
Hertha BSC	1 – 2	SSV Ulm 1846
MSV Duisburg	1 – 2	Karlsruher SC	(AET)
VfB Stuttgart	0 – 2	Borussia Mönchengladbach
FC Bayern Munich	4 – 0	Borussia Dortmund
SV Darmstadt 98	1 – 3	SV Werder Bremen
KSV Hessen Kassel	1 – 2	VfL Bochum
SV Waldhof Mannheim	3 – 1	VfB Eppingen
Freiburger FC	2 – 0	Holstein Kiel
Urania Hamburg	1 – 3	Göttingen 05
1. FC Bocholt	3 – 1	VfR Bürstadt
15 December 1981
Rot-Weiß Essen	4 – 1	Bayer 04 Leverkusen
22 December 1981
1. FC Nürnberg	2 – 0	Fortuna Düsseldorf
30 December 1981
VfR Wormatia Worms	0 – 2	FSV Frankfurt
SpVgg Bayreuth	2 – 0	VfB Oldenburg	(AET)

=== Round of 16 ===
9 January 1982
Hannover 96	1 – 3	1. FC Nürnberg
Rot-Weiß Essen	0 – 4	Borussia Mönchengladbach
SV Werder Bremen	2 – 0	SpVgg Bayreuth
SV Waldhof Mannheim	1 – 1	VfL Bochum	(AET)
1. FC Bocholt	3 – 3	Göttingen 05	(AET)
9 January 1982
SSV Ulm 1846	1 – 0	FSV Frankfurt
19 January 1982
Freiburger FC	0 – 3	FC Bayern Munich
26 January 1982
Hamburger SV	6 – 1	Karlsruher SC

==== Replays ====
16 January 1982
Göttingen 05	3 – 2	1. FC Bocholt
26 January 1982
VfL Bochum	3 – 1	SV Waldhof Mannheim

=== Quarter-finals ===
20 February 1982
Göttingen 05	2 – 4	Hamburger SV
1. FC Nürnberg	3 – 1	Borussia Mönchengladbach
SV Werder Bremen	1 – 2	FC Bayern Munich	(AET)
VfL Bochum	3 – 1	SSV Ulm 1846	(AET)

=== Semi-finals ===
10 April 1982
1. FC Nürnberg	2 – 0	Hamburger SV
VfL Bochum	1 – 2	FC Bayern Munich

=== Final ===
1 May 1982
17:00 CEST

Bayern Munich	4–2	1. FC Nürnberg
Rummenigge 54'; Kraus 65'; Breitner 72' (pen.); Hoeneß 89'	Report	Hintermaier 31'; Dreßel 44'

Waldstadion, Frankfurt
Attendance: 61,000
Referee: Gerd Hennig (Duisburg)
