= Jörg Wacker =

German footballer and administrator

Jörg Wacker is a German football administrator and former footballer who is last known to have been the head of internationalization and strategy of German Bundesliga side FC Bayern.

== Early life ==
As a university student, Wacker studied literature and sports at the Karlsruhe Institute of Technology.

== Playing career ==
As a footballer, Wacker played for German side VfR Pforzheim.

== Style of play ==
Wacker mainly operated as a striker and was known for his technical ability.

== Administrative career ==
After graduating from university, Wacker worked as a managing director for German television channel Sport1. After that, he was appointed managing director of Austrian online betting brand Bwin. In 2013, he was appointed head of internationalization and strategy of German Bundesliga side FC Bayern. He also became part of the club's five-person board. In 2021, he left FC Bayern.

== Personal life ==
Wacker has two brothers and a daughter.
