= Christian Haas =

Christian Haas may refer to:

- Christian Haas (sprinter) (born 1958), German sprinter
- Christian Haas (footballer) (born 1978), German footballer
- Christian Ludwig "Chrislo" Haas (1956–2004), German musician

== See also ==
- Christian Haass (born 1960), German biochemist
