= Christian Haas (footballer) =

German footballer

Personal information
- Full name: Christian Haas
- Date of birth: 18 November 1978 (age 47)
- Place of birth: Mannheim, West Germany
- Height: 1.82 m (6 ft 0 in)
- Position: Forward

Youth career
- Waldhof Mannheim

Senior career*
Years	Team	Apps	(Gls)
1998–1999	FV Lauda	29	(16)
1999–2002	VfB Stuttgart II	61	(21)
2002–2003	1899 Hoffenheim	5	(0)
2003–2004	FV Lauda	49	(11)
2004–2008	SSV Reutlingen 05	118	(53)
2008–2009	SV Sandhausen	26	(3)
2009–2011	VfR Aalen	32	(6)
2011–2013	SpVgg Neckarelz	53	(19)
Total		373	(129)
- * Club domestic league appearances and goals

Christian Haas (born 18 November 1978) is a German former footballer who played as a forward.
