= Rüdiger Kauf =

German footballer (born 1975)

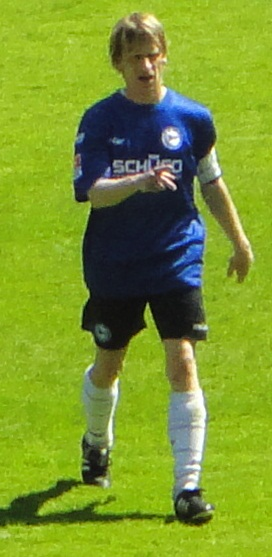
- Kauf with Arminia Bielefeld in 2011

Personal information
- Full name: Rüdiger Kauf
- Date of birth: 1 March 1975 (age 51)
- Place of birth: Esslingen, West Germany
- Height: 1.72 m (5 ft 8 in)
- Position: Midfielder

Youth career
- 1982–1994: TV Hochdorf
- 1994–1996: SC Geislingen
- 1996–1998: VfL Kirchheim/Teck

Senior career*
Years	Team	Apps	(Gls)
1998–2001	VfB Stuttgart II	77	(7)
1999–2001	VfB Stuttgart	14	(0)
2001–2011	Arminia Bielefeld	278	(6)
Total		369	(13)
- * Club domestic league appearances and goals

Rüdiger Kauf (born 1 March 1975) is a German former professional footballer who played as a midfielder. After having a short spell at VfB Stuttgart he moved to Arminia Bielefeld in 2001. He is called "Rübe" (English: Beet) by the Arminia fans.

== Career ==
Born in Esslingen am Neckar, Baden-Württemberg, Kauf started his career in the youth team of TV Hochdorf in 1982. From 1994 to 1996 he played for SC Geislingen and from 1996 to 1998 for VfL Kirchheim/Teck. In 1998, Kauf signed his first professional contract with VfB Stuttgart. In the 1999–2000 season, he debuted in the Bundesliga. In the three years at Stuttgart he was not able to get a permanent place in the first team and so he left for Arminia Bielefeld in the 2. Bundesliga. With Bielefeld he achieved the promotion to the Bundesliga in the 2001–02 season. The club was relegated in the season after but achieved immediate promotion again in the 2003–04 season. Kauf had been an integral part of the team and had also been captain for Arminia Bielefeld. Following injuries during the 2010–11 season, he retired at the end of that season.

== Style of play ==
In Bielefeld, Kauf was an undisputed regular and the so-called "midfield engine" of Arminia due to his tireless running performance and ball-winning ability. He stood out especially for his commitment and readiness for running.
