= Verbandsliga Nordbaden =

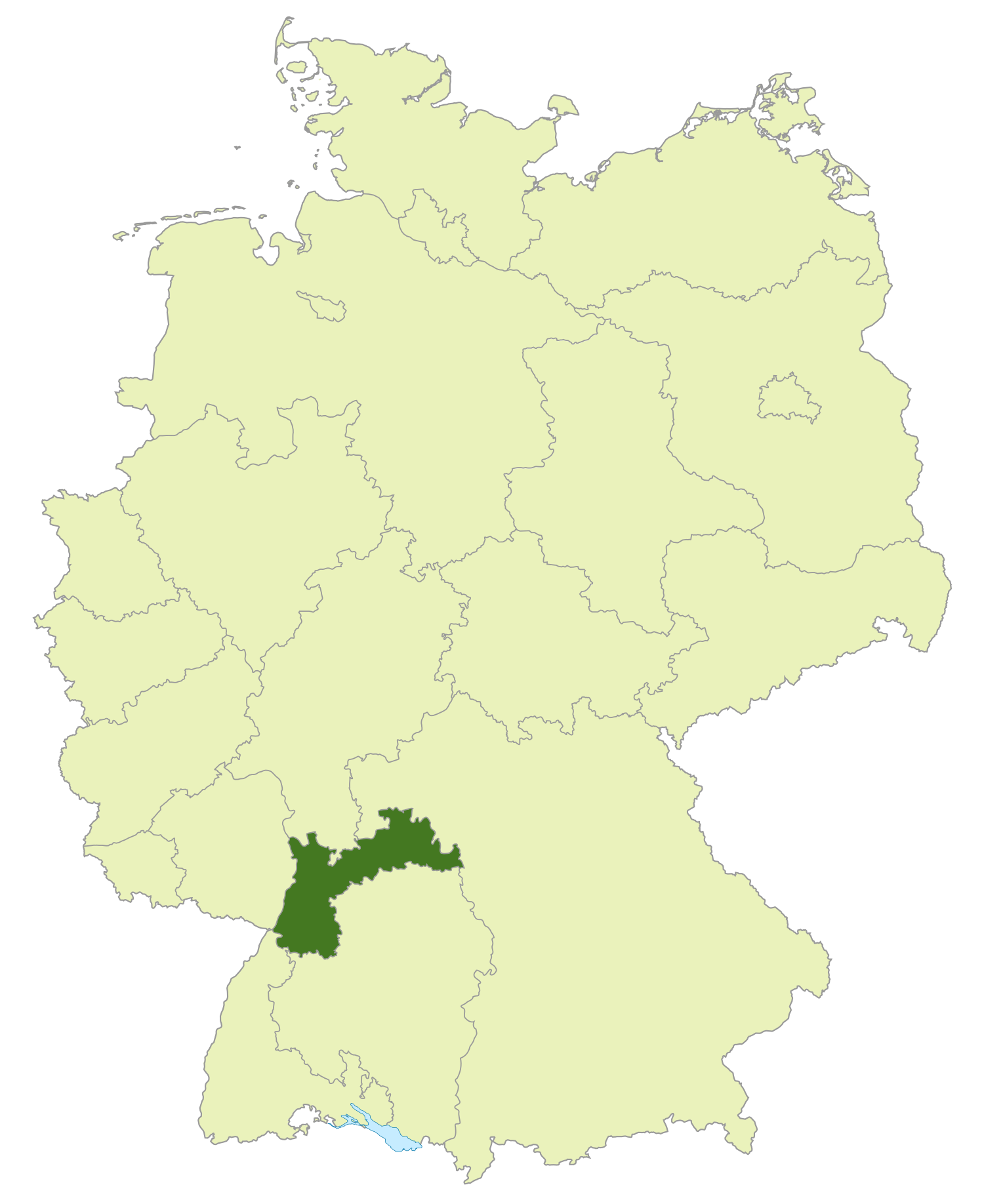
- Organising body: Baden Football Association
- Founded: 1945
- Country: Germany
- State: Baden-Württemberg
- Region: Baden
- Number of clubs: 16
- Level on pyramid: Level 6
- Promotion to: Oberliga Baden-Württemberg
- Relegation to: Landesliga Mittelbaden; Landesliga Odenwald; Landesliga Rhein/Neckar
- Domestic cup: Baden Cup
- Current champions: Karlsruher SC II (2024-25)

The Verbandsliga Nordbaden is a German amateur football division administered by the Baden Football Association, one of the 21 German state football associations. Being the top flight of the Baden state association, the Verbandsliga is currently a level 6 division of the German football league system.

== Overview ==
The league was formed as Amateurliga Nordbaden in 1945 in the northern half of the then-state of Württemberg-Baden, which is now the northwestern part of the German state of Baden-Württemberg. It was a feeder league to the Oberliga Süd and therefore the second tier of the football league system in the south of Germany until the inception of the 2nd Oberliga Süd in 1950. From 1950 until the establishment of the Oberliga Baden-Württemberg in 1978, it was the third tier of the football league system.

The winner of the Amateurliga Nordbaden was not automatically promoted but rather had to take part in a promotion play-off to its league above. Usually, the champion had to compete with the winners of the Amateurligas Südbaden, Württemberg and (from 1961) Schwarzwald-Bodensee.

The separation of North Baden and South Baden resulted from the outcome of World War II when the state was split into two separate occupation zones. The north was in the American zone and the south in the French zone. The official names for the two FA's reflect the separation of South Baden from the original association, with North Baden just simply calling itself Baden FA.

The league was established in 1945 with ten teams, the winner gaining promotion to the Oberliga Süd. The founder members were:

- VfL Neckarau
- VfB Knielingen
- VfB Mühlburg
- VfR Pforzheim
- ASV Feudenheim
- SpVgg Sandhofen
- Amicitia Viernheim
- FV Daxlanden
- Phönix Mannheim
- 1. FC Pforzheim

The league was split into a northern and a southern group from 1946 to 1948.

With the introduction of the Bundesliga in 1963, the Amateurliga was placed below the new Regionalliga Süd but still retained its third-tier status. It continued to do so after the introduction of the 2nd Bundesliga Süd in 1974.

The longest continuous member of the league was the SV Sandhausen, which gained promotion to it in 1957 and spent 21 seasons in it until its admittance to the new Oberliga in 1978. The VfR Pforzheim spent a record of 28 out of 33 possible seasons in the league.

At the same time as the Oberliga Baden-Württemberg was introduced in 1978, the Amateurliga Nordbaden was renamed Verbandsliga Nordbaden. The top five teams out of the Amateurliga went to the new Oberliga while the rest of the teams found themselves in the Verbandsliga. The league was now set at tier four of the league system.

The winner of the Verbandsliga gains direct promotion to the Oberliga. The runners-up have a play-off against the runners-up of the Verbandsliga Südbaden. The winner of this play-off has to face the runners-up of the Verbandsliga Württemberg for the final Oberliga spot. In 1981, no extra spots, and in 1994 three extra spots were available due to league format changes.

Feeder leagues to the Verbandsliga Nordbaden:

- Landesliga Mittelbaden
- Landesliga Odenwald
- Landesliga Rhein/Neckar

The term "Verbandsliga" translates as "Football Association League". There are 21 football associations within the German Football Association, North Baden being one of them.

== League champions ==
The league champions of the league:

Season	Club
1945–46	**VfL Neckarau**
1946–47	**VfB Mühlburg**
1946–47	ASV Feudenheim
1947–48	TSG Rohrbach
1947–48	VfR Pforzheim
1948–49	1. FC Pforzheim
1949–50	**VfL Neckarau**
1950–51	**ASV Feudenheim**
1951–52	**Karlsruher FV**
1952–53	FV Daxlanden
1953–54	Amicitia Viernheim
1954–55	Amicitia Viernheim
1955–56	Amicitia Viernheim
1956–57	**Amicitia Viernheim**
1957–58	VfL Neckarau
1958–59	VfR Pforzheim
1959–60	Phönix Mannheim
1960–61	SV Sandhausen
1961–62	VfL Neckarau
1962–63	FV 09 Weinheim
1963–64	SV Schwetzingen
1964–65	Karlsruher SC II
1965–66	Germania Forst
1966–67	ASV Feudenheim
1967–68	**VfL Neckarau**
1968–69	Germania Forst
1969–70	FV 09 Weinheim

Season	Club
1970–71	Waldhof Mannheim
1971–72	**Waldhof Mannheim**
1972–73	**VfR Mannheim**
1973–74	Karlsruher FV
1974–75	VfB Eppingen
1975–76	VfR Mannheim
1976–77	SV Neckargerach
1977–78	FV 09 Weinheim
1978–79	**VfB Eppingen**
1979–80	**SV Neckargerach**
1980–81	**FV Lauda**
1981–82	**SV Neckargerach**
1982–83	**Karlsruher SC II**
1983–84	**SGK Heidelberg**
1984–85	**1. FC Pforzheim**
1985–86	**SV Schwetzingen**
1986–87	**Amicitia Viernheim**
1987–88	**VfL Neckarau**
1988–89	**Karlsruher SC II**
1989–90	**VfB Eppingen**
1990–91	**VfB Leimen**
1991–92	**VfR Pforzheim**
1992–93	**ASV Durlach**
1993–94	**Karlsruher SC II**
1994–95	**FC Bammenthal**
1995–96	**SG Oftersheim**

Season	Club
1996–97	**FV Lauda**
1997–98	**SGK Heidelberg**
1998–99	**TSG 62 Weinheim**
1999–2000	**TSG 1899 Hoffenheim**
2000–01	**TSG 62 Weinheim**
2001–02	**FC Nöttingen**
2002–03	**TSG 62 Weinheim**
2003–04	**VfR Mannheim**
2004–05	**ASV Durlach**
2005–06	**1. FC Pforzheim**
2006–07	**FC Astoria Walldorf**
2007–08	**ASV Durlach**
2008–09	**SV Spielberg**
2009–10	**SpVgg Neckarelz**
2010–11	**SV Spielberg**
2011–12	**TSV Grunbach**
2012–13	**1. FC Bruchsal**
2013–14	**SV Kickers Pforzheim**
2014–15	**SV Sandhausen II**
2015–16	**FC Astoria Walldorf II**
2016–17	**TSG Weinheim**
2017–18	**FC Germania Friedrichstal**
2018–19	VfB Gartenstadt
2019–20	**FC Astoria Walldorf II**
2020–21	None
2021–22	**ATSV Mutschelbach**

Source: "Verbandsliga Nordbaden". Das deutsche Fußball-Archiv.

- **Bold** denotes team gained promotion.
- In 1950, three teams were promoted to the new 2nd Oberliga Süd.
- In 1965, VfR Pforzheim gained promotion as runners–up as the reserve team of Karlsruher SC was ineligible.
- In 2019, the reserve team of SV Sandhausen gained promotion as runners-up when VfB Gartenstadt declined.
- In 2020, 1. FC Bruchsal also gained promotion as runners-up due to Oberliga expansion.
- In 2021, the season was curtailed and voided because of the COVID-19 pandemic in Germany.

=== Teams promoted to the Oberliga after play–offs ===
Since the 1978–79 seasons the runners–up have the opportunity to play–off for promotion. The following runners–up have succeeded in the promotion round:

- 1982 SV Schwetzingen
- 1983 FV 09 Weinheim
- 1985 FV Lauda
- 1989 Amicitia Viernheim
- 1994 Amicitia Viernheim
- 1996 SGK Heidelberg
- 2001 Waldhof Mannheim II
- 2003 TSG Hoffenheim II
- 2009 TSG Weinheim
- 2011 VfR Mannheim
- 2014 FC Germania Friedrichstal
- 2015 1. CfR Pforzheim

== League placings ==
The complete list of clubs in the league and their league placings since 1994.

Club	S	95	96	97	98	99	00	01	02	03	04	05	06	07	08	09	10	11	12	13	14	15	16	17	18	19	20	21	22	23
TSG Hoffenheim	4			9	3	2	1	1	13	5	5	7	4	2	2	7	11	11	11	16	9	8	15	4	3	9	6	11	9	x
TSG Hoffenheim II	2								2	2	10	8	6	8	5	2	1	5	7	9	10	9	3	4	6	10	9	16	13	x
FC Astoria Walldorf	6								6	3	4	8	5	1	8	4	2	8	7	2	1	8	11	11	11	13	5	18	10	x
FC Nöttingen	5				11	12	12	6	1	8	1	18	9	14	11	5	9	2	6	4	3	15	2	19	5	4	12	5	7	x
1. CfR Pforzheim ^{5}	5																	7	12	4	7	2	5	8	13	11	13	11	5	x
1. FC Bruchsal	10																	9	10	1	17	6	8	4	4	6	2	14	18	x
FC Astoria Walldorf II	9																11	5	4	6	2	3	1	15	17	5	1	19	16	x
SV Sandhausen II^{9}	6															15		14		12	5	1	10	11	16	2	18	21		
ATSV Mutschelbach	4																									4	3	3	1	x
SV Spielberg	19	5	6	8	7	3	9	12	12	6	9	3	4	7	6	1	15	1	14	15	16	1	16	10	14	18	5	1	2	x
VfR Mannheim ^{3}	10	8	2	7	14	10	3	8	9		1	12	10	15	16	16	4	2	2	3	15	17	3	3	3	9	8	10	3	x
VfB Eppingen	24				9	6	13	14					10	15							14			9	5	8	7	4	4	x
Fortuna Heddesheim	6																							2	2	3	4	2	5	x
Waldhof Mannheim II ^{4}	24	9	7	2	8	10	2	2	6	10							5	12	7	11	8	13					12	6	6	x
FC Zuzenhausen	15												8	3	5	3	7	10	9	14			10	8	10	10	13	8	7	x
TSG Weinheim ^{2}	22	6	10	7	5	1	15	1	16	1	18	6	3	2	4	2	5	16	2	5	11	5	2	1	18	11	14	7	8	x
1. FC Mühlhausen	2																											5	9	x
Olympia Kirrlach	5																								9	7	10	12	10	x
VfR Gommersdorf	7							15													15		13		16		15	9	11	x
FC Germania Friedrichstal	25													10	13	7	2	4	8	7	3	12	17	5	1	16	11	16	12	x
SV Langensteinbach	2																											11	13	x
SpVgg Neckarelz	12											17		14	9	4	1	4	3	1	9	12	17	18	13		9	13	14	
FV Fortuna Kirchfeld	3																										16	14	15	
SpVgg Durlach-Aue	9															13						7	9	6	6	13	17	15	16	
TSV 1887 Wieblingen	2																									12	18			
VfB Gartenstadt ^{8}	3																								8	1	6			
TuS Bilfingen	3																							10	12	14				
SV Schwetzingen	30	4	11	4	12	4	3	4	4	15				13	11	6	8	8	3	2	6	8	7	11	7	15				
FC 07 Heidelsheim	9														7	9	3	3	11	10	13	14				16				
FV Lauda	21	2	3	1	12	4	2	5	10	6	13	13	17	8	14	8	12	15					5	14		17				
SGK Heidelberg	28	3	2	13	1	8	3	15	8	7	8	11	7	12	10	5	13			9	10	9	11	12	11	18				
FC Español Karlsruhe	1																								14					
ASV Durlach	20	14	12	15	2	7	6	7	3	4	11	1	16	6	1	14	14	18	5	13			6	7	15					
TSV Reichenbach	20											9	6	9	16					8	4	10	12	13						
Amicitia Viernheim ^{6}	16	15	16	14											2	12	9	11	13			4	4	15						
TSV Strümpfelbrunn	1																							16						
FC Spöck	5																		6	3	9	11	14							
TSV Höpfingen	3																			15		12	15							
SV Kickers Pforzheim	2																				1	18	16							
SpVgg Neckarelz II	2																				12	15								
TSV Grunbach ^{7}	1																		1	13	2									
TSV Buchen	2															16			14											
DJK/FC Ziegelhausen/Peterstal	1																		15											
1. FC Birkenfeld	4												11	17				6	16											
FC Mosbach	6																	13												
1. FC Pforzheim^{5}	11	8	3	2	5	3	7	2	3	12	19	4	1	16	3	10	6													
TV Hardheim	11		14		4	15			11	8	10	5	9	11	15		10													
FC Germania Forst	11					11	10	5	13	13							14													
FC Rot	4													5	12	11	15													
SpVgg Oberhausen	7									5	3	2	2	4	8	14														
SV Schollbrunn	4						15			14		14			17															
FC Neureut	14						7	8	9	10	7	13	12	16																
TSV Viernheim ^{6}	14	12	9	10	15		16				12	10	13																	
FC Viktoria Bammental	10	1	10	11	16	5	5	11	10	11	5	7	14																	
VfB Leimen	15	11	4	3	6	8	4	3	5	9	2	12	15																	
SV Schefflenz	1												16																	
SV Seckenheim	2										6	15																		
SpVgg Ketsch	3							10	15			16																		
VfR Ittersbach	6			5	10	13	11	16			13																			
Viktoria Wertheim	14			12	16						14																			
SV Sinsheim	15					9	8	9	7	12	15																			
SV Laudenbach	1									16																				
SpVgg Heidelsheim	1								14																					
FC Oestringen	7							13																						
SG Dielheim	10		8	13	14	14	14																							
SG Oftersheim	11	7	1	16	13	16																								
VfR Grötzingen	6	8	12	11	17																									
FV 09 Weinheim ^{2}	7	10	5	6	18																									
Spfr. Dossenheim	1			15																										
Alemannia Wilferdingen	3	13	13																											
Fvgg Weingarten	7		15																											
Karlsruher FV	3	14																												
VfR Ussingheim	1	15																												
VfB Bretten	3																													x
Türkspor Mosbach	1																													x
VfL Neckarau	12																													x

=== Key ===
Color	Key
1, 2, 3, ...	Bundesliga
1, 2, 3, ...	2. Bundesliga
1, 2, 3, ...	3. Liga
1, 2, 3, ...	Regionalliga Süd (1994–2012); Regionalliga Südwest (2012–present)
1, 2, 3, ...	Oberliga Baden-Württemberg
1, 2, 3, ...	Verbandsliga Nordbaden
1	League champions
	Played at a league level below this league

- S = No. of seasons in league (as of 2022–23)

=== Notes ===
- ^{1} In 1995, VfR Pforzheim withdrew from the Oberliga.
- ^{2} In 1998, FV 09 Weinheim joined TSG Weinheim.
- ^{3} In 2002, VfR Mannheim withdrew to the Landesliga.
- ^{4} In 2003, Waldhof Mannheim II withdrew from the Oberliga.
- ^{5} In 2010, 1. FC Pforzheim merged with VfR Pforzheim to form 1. CfR Pforzheim.
- ^{6} In 2008, SpVgg Amicitia Viernheim merged with TSV Viernheim to form TSV Amicitia Viernheim and in 2017, Amiticia withdrew from the Verbandsliga.
- ^{7} In 2014, TSV Grunbach withdrew from the Oberliga.
- ^{8} In 2020, VfB Gartenstadt withdrew from the Verbandsliga.
- ^{9} In 2021, SV Sandhausen II withdrew from the Oberliga.
