= Baden Cup =

North Baden Cup
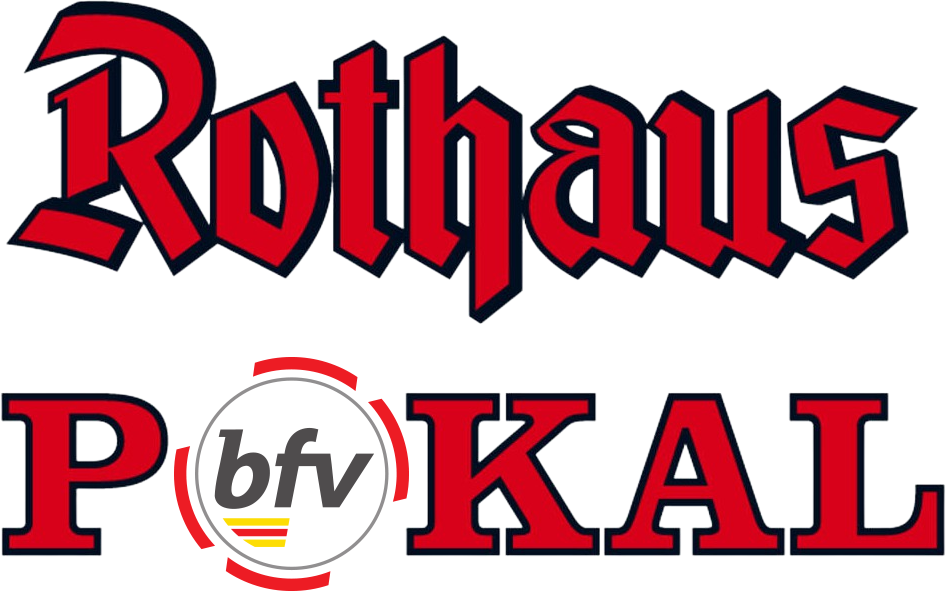
- Founded: 1949
- Region: Baden-Württemberg, Germany
- Qualifier for: DFB-Pokal
- Current champions: Waldhof Mannheim (2025–26)
- Most championships: SV Sandhausen (14 titles)

The North Baden Cup (German: Badischer Pokal or BFV-Pokal) is one of the 21 regional cup competitions of German football. The winner of the competition gains entry to the first round of the German Cup.

== History ==
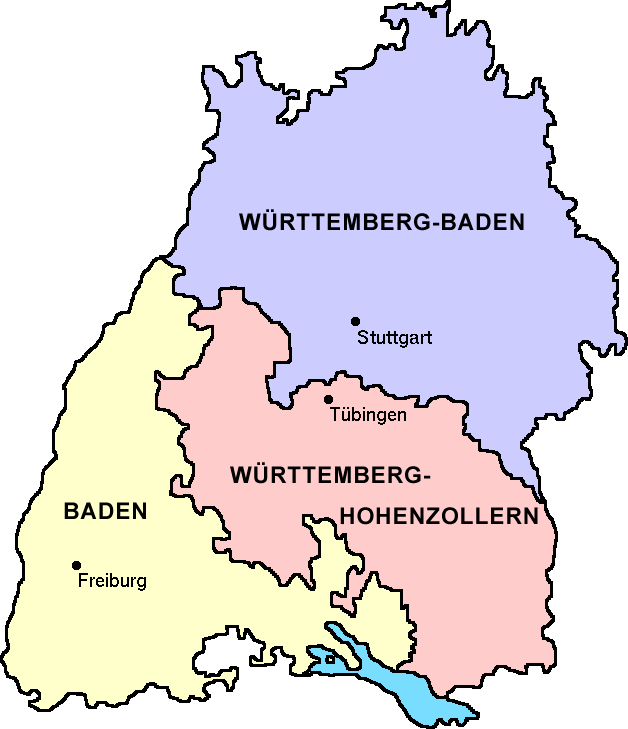
The three states that merged to form Baden-Württemberg in 1952

The Cup was established in 1949, after the end of the Second World War, in the US occupation zone in the northern half of the state of Baden, which existed as part of the state of Württemberg-Baden from 1945 to 1952, when the state of Baden-Württemberg was formed. Due to the southern half of the state being under French occupation, the Baden football association was cut in half and a northern and southern federation was formed. The same happened with the regional cup competition.

The North Baden Cup is played annually, with the exception of 1950 to 1956, when it was not held.

From 1974 onwards, the winner of the South Baden Cup qualified for the first round of the German Cup. At times, the BFV was permitted to send both, winner and finalist to the first round of the German Cup, currently (2008–09), it is only the winner as North Baden is not one of the three largest federations, which are permitted to send two clubs.

The cup has been sponsored by the brewery Privatbrauerei Hoepfner since 1996 and therefore currently carries the name BFV-Hoepfner-Cup.

The North Baden cup winners have at times performed quite well in the national cup competition. In 1974–75, the first season the regional cup winners entered the DFB-Pokal directly, VfB Eppingen, the North Baden Cup winner, reached the fourth round of the cup, beating Bundesliga side Hamburger SV 2–1 on the way.

In 1990–91, the North Baden Cup winners FV 09 Weinheim defeated FC Bayern Munich 1–0 in the first round of the German Cup.

== Modus ==
Professional clubs are not permitted to enter the competition, meaning, no teams from the Bundesliga and the 2. Bundesliga can compete.

All clubs from North Baden playing in the 3. Liga (III), Regionalliga Süd (IV) and Oberliga Baden-Württemberg (V), Verbandsliga Nordbaden (VI) and the three Landesligas (VII) gain direct entry to the first round. Additionally, the best teams of the regional cup competitions in North Baden also qualify for the competition.

== Cup finals ==
Held annually at the end of season, these were the cup finals since 1949:

Season	Location	Winner	Finalist	Result	Attendance
1949–50		1. FC Eutingen			
1950–56	not held				
1956–57		VfL Neckarau			
1957–58		FV Hockenheim			
1958–59		FC 08 Neureut			
1959–60		FV Wiesental			
1960–61		Karlsruher FV			
1961–62		Karlsruher FV			
1962–63		FV Hockenheim			
1963–64		FV Hockenheim			
1964–65		Karlsruher FV			
1965–66		ASV Feudenheim			
1966–67		VfL Neckarau			
1967–68		ASV Feudenheim			
1968–69		SV Schwetzingen			
1969–70		FC Germania Friedrichsfeld			
1970–71		FC Östringen			
1971–72		VfR Mannheim			
1972–73		VfB Eppingen			
1973–74		VfB Eppingen			
1974–75		FV 09 Weinheim			
1975–76		SV Neckargerach			
1976–77		SV Sandhausen			
1977–78		SV Sandhausen			
1978–79		FC Östringen			
1979–80		FV Lauda			
1980–81		SV Sandhausen			
1981–82		SV Sandhausen			
1982–83		SV Sandhausen			
1983–84		SV Schwetzingen			
1984–85		SV Sandhausen	FC Germania Friedrichstal		
1985–86		SV Sandhausen			
1986–87		1. FC Pforzheim			
1987–88		SG Heidelberg-Kirchheim			
1988–89		1. FC Pforzheim			
1989–90		FV 09 Weinheim			
1990–91		Karlsruher SC II			
1991–92		SG Heidelberg-Kirchheim			
1992–93		1. FC Pforzheim			
1993–94		Karlsruher SC II			
1994–95		SV Sandhausen			
1995–96	Forst, 30 May 1996	Karlsruher SC II	SV Sandhausen	3–1	
1996–97	Mosbach-Neckarelz, 20 May 1997	VfR Mannheim	FV Lauda	3–0	1,300
1997–98		SV Waldhof Mannheim			
1998–99		SV Waldhof Mannheim			
1999–2000	Mosbach-Neckarelz, 1 June 2000	Karlsruher SC II	FV Lauda	2–0	2,000
2000–01	Forst, 15 May 2001	VfR Mannheim	Karlsruher SC	2–0	950
2001–02	Odenheim, 22 May 2002	TSG 1899 Hoffenheim	1. FC Pforzheim	4–0	1,200
2002–03	Mannheim, 27 May 2003	TSG 1899 Hoffenheim	SV Sandhausen	2–1	2,800
2003–04	Hoffenheim, 18 May 2004	TSG 1899 Hoffenheim	VfR Mannheim	1–0	1,400
2004–05	Dielheim, 2 June 2005	TSG 1899 Hoffenheim	SG Heidelberg-Kirchheim	6–0	
2005–06	Forst, 30 May 2006	SV Sandhausen	Karlsruher SC II	4–1 aet	1,250
2006–07	Sankt Leon-Rot, 5 June 2007	SV Sandhausen	TSG Hoffenheim	1–0	1,200
2007–08	Stutensee, 5 June 2008	ASV Durlach	FC Germania Forst	4–1	
2008–09	Sinsheim, 5 June 2009	SpVgg Neckarelz	SV Sandhausen II	1–0	
2009–10	Nöttingen, 11 May 2010	SV Sandhausen II	FC Nöttingen	2–2, 6–7 after pen.	1,812
2010–11	11 May 2011	SV Sandhausen	FC Nöttingen	1–0	
2011–12	Bammenthal, 23 May 2012	FC Nöttingen	SpVgg Neckarelz	4–3 pen	
2012–13	Forst, 15 May 2013	Karlsruher SC	FC Nöttingen	1–0	
2013–14	Waghäusel, 20 May 2014	FC Astoria Walldorf	FC Nöttingen	1–0	
2014–15	Langensteinbach, 20 May 2015	FC Nöttingen	SV Spielberg	3–2	3,421
2015–16	Bammental, 28 May 2016	FC Astoria Walldorf	SpVgg Neckarelz	2–0	
2016–17	Sinsheim, 25 May 2017	FC Nöttingen	SG HD-Kirchheim	5–0	
2017–18	Nöttingen, 25 May 2017	Karlsruher SC	1. CfR Pforzheim	1–1 (a.e.t.) (4–5 p)	
2018–19	Karlsruhe, 26 May 2019	Karlsruher SC	Waldhof Mannheim	5–3	7,367
2019–20	Hoffenheim, 22 August 2020	Waldhof Mannheim	FC Nöttingen	4–1	0
2020–21	Pforzheim, 29 May 2021	Waldhof Mannheim	Astoria Walldorf	2–1	0
2021–22	Mannheim, 21 May 2022	Waldhof Mannheim	Türkspor Mannheim	3–0	5,747
2022–23	Nöttingen, 3 June 2023	Astoria Walldorf	1. CfR Pforzheim	2–0	
2023–24	Walldorf, 3 June 2024	SV Sandhausen	1. FC Mühlhausen	8–0	2,400
2024–25	Eppingen, 24 May 2025	SV Sandhausen	GU-Türk. SV Pforzheim	4–0	2,531
2025–26	Mannheim, 23 May 2026	Waldhof Mannheim	VfR Mannheim	3–0	16,591

- Source: "Nordbadische Pokalsieger" (in German). DSFS.
- Winners in **bold**

== Winners ==
Listed in order of wins, the Cup winners are:

Club	Wins
SV Sandhausen	14^{1}
SV Waldhof Mannheim	6
TSG 1899 Hoffenheim	4
Karlsruher SC II	4
VfR Mannheim	3
1. FC Pforzheim	3
Karlsruher FV	3
FV Hockenheim	3
FC Nöttingen	3
Karlsruher SC	3
FC Astoria Walldorf	3
SG Heidelberg-Kirchheim	2
FV 09 Weinheim	2
SV Schwetzingen	2
FC Östringen	2
VfB Eppingen	2
ASV Feudenheim	2
VfL Neckarau	2
SpVgg Neckarelz	1
ASV Durlach	1
FV Lauda	1
SV Neckargerach	1
FC Germania Friedrichsfeld	1
FV Wiesental	1
FC 08 Neureut	1
1. FC Eutingen	1

- ^{1} Includes one win by the club's reserve side.
