= ASV Durlach =

German football club

- Full name: Allgemeiner Sportverein Durlach e.V.
- Founded: 1902
- Ground: Turmbergstadion Liebensteinstraße
- Manager: Rizzo Domenico
- League: Kreisliga Karlsruhe (VIII)
- 2019–20: 4th
Home colours	Away colours

ASV Durlach is a German association football club from the borough of Durlach in the city of Karlsruhe, Baden-Württemberg.

== History ==
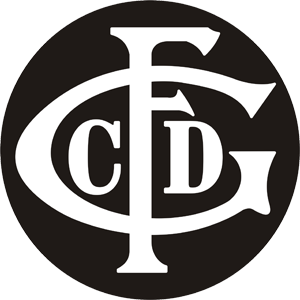
Logo of predecessor side FC Germania Durlach.

The club was established on 14 May 1902 as Fußball Club Germania Durlach. During World War II they were briefly partnered with Fußball Club Phönix Karlsruhe and played from 1943 to 1945 as Kriegspielgemainschaft Karlsruhe. Following the war occupying Allied authorities ordered the dissolution of most organizations, including sports and football clubs. ASV was re-established on 1 June 1946, and in addition to their former membership, included the memberships of VfR Durlach, Turnerschaft Durlach, and TG Durlach. The following year they were joined by Tennisclub Durlach.

Throughout the early existence of the association, the footballers played as an unheralded local side in lower-tier competition. ASV fielded competitive sides in the third division Amateurliga Nordbaden in four seasons from 1946 to 1950, earning a second-place finish in 1948, and top four finishes in each of the other seasons. Durlach advanced to the 2. Liga-Süd where they played until 1955 when they were relegated back to Amateurliga play. They struggled through four seasons there until again being demoted. They made a brief two season re-appearance in the Amateurliga Nordbaden (III) in 1965–67.

After promotion to the Verbandsliga Nordbaden in 1988, ASV enjoyed its most recent turn in upper-level football in the Oberliga Baden-Württemberg (IV) between 1993 and 1997 and again in the 2005–06 season, where they earned lower table results in five campaigns. In 2007–08, a Verbandsliga championship returned the club to the Oberliga, where it played until 2011, when it was relegated once more. In 2013 it suffered another relegation, now to the Landesliga, but won a league championship there in 2015 and returned to the Verbandsliga.

== Honors ==
The club's honours:

=== League ===
- Verbandsliga Nordbaden (V)
  - Champions: 1993, 2005, 2008
- Landesliga Mittelbaden
  - Champions: 2015
  - Runners-up: 2014

=== Cup ===
- North Baden Cup
  - Winners: 2008

== Recent managers ==
Recent managers of the club:

Manager	Start	Finish
Jürgen Apfel	1 July 2008	30 August 2008
Klaus Kleinert	1 September 2008	30 June 2009
Rainer Krieg	1 July 2009	30 June 2011
Adis Herceg	1 July 2011	Present

== Recent seasons ==
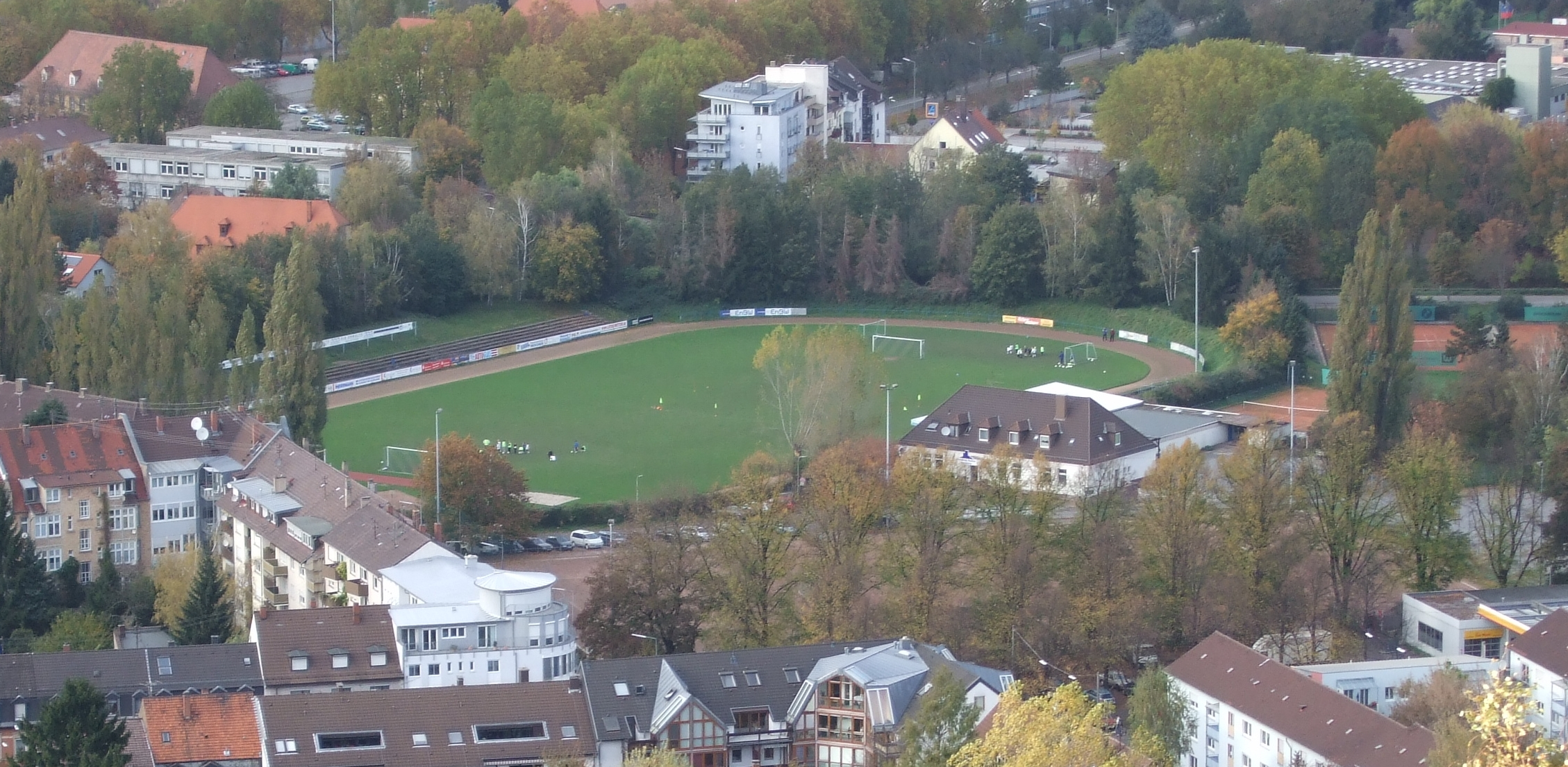
Area of ASV Durlach

The recent season-by-season performance of the club:

Season	Division	Tier	Position
1999–2000	Verbandsliga Nordbaden	V	6th
2000–01	Verbandsliga Nordbaden	V	7th
2001–02	Verbandsliga Nordbaden	V	3rd
2002–03	Verbandsliga Nordbaden	V	4th
2003–04	Verbandsliga Nordbaden	V	11th
2004–05	Verbandsliga Nordbaden	V	1st ↑
2005–06	Oberliga Baden-Württemberg	IV	16th ↓
2006–07	Verbandsliga Nordbaden	V	6th
2007–08	Verbandsliga Nordbaden	V	1st ↑
2008–09	Oberliga Baden-Württemberg	V	14th
2009–10	Oberliga Baden-Württemberg	V	14th
2010–11	Oberliga Baden-Württemberg	V	18th ↓
2011–12	Verbandsliga Nordbaden	VI	5th
2012–13	Verbandsliga Nordbaden	VI	13th ↓
2013–14	Landesliga Mittelbaden	VII	2nd
2014–15	Landesliga Mittelbaden	VII	1st ↑
2015–16	Verbandsliga Nordbaden	VI	6th
2016–17	Verbandsliga Nordbaden	VI	4th
2017–18	Verbandsliga Nordbaden	VI	15th ↓
2018–19	Landesliga Mittelbaden	VII	16th ↓
2019–20	Kreisliga Karlsruhe	VIII	4th
2020–21	Kreisliga Karlsruhe	VIII	

- With the introduction of the Regionalligas in 1994 and the 3. Liga in 2008 as the new third tier, below the 2. Bundesliga, all leagues below dropped one tier.

↑ Promoted	↓ Relegated
