= Thorsten Walther =

German footballer (born 1972)

Personal information
- Date of birth: 20 September 1972 (age 54)
- Place of birth: Germany
- Position: Goalkeeper

Senior career*
Years	Team	Apps	(Gls)
–1994	SC Geislingen		
1994–1995	FC Augsburg		
1996	VfB Stuttgart	0	(0)
1997–1999	Fortuna Düsseldorf	47	(0)
1999–2000	Toulouse	6	(0)
- * Club domestic league appearances and goals

Thorsten Walther (born 20 September 1972) is a German former professional footballer who played as a goalkeeper.

== Career ==
Walther started his career with SC Geislingen. Before the second half of 1996–97, he signed for Fortuna Düsseldorf in the German Bundesliga, where he made 49 appearances and suffered relegation to the German second tier. On 14 February 1997, he debuted for Fortuna Düsseldorf in a 2–0 loss to 1. FC Köln. In 1999, Walther signed for French second tier club Toulouse.
