= SG Heidelberg-Kirchheim =

German football club

SGK Heidelberg
- Full name: Sportgemeinschaft Heidelberg-Kirchheim e.V.
- Founded: 1945
- Ground: Sportzentrum Süd
- Capacity: 6,000
- Chairman: Uwe Hollmichel
- Manager: Frank Hettrich
- League: Verbandsliga Baden (VI)
- 2015–16: 11th
Home colours	Away colours

Sportgemeinschaft Heidelberg-Kirchheim e.V., commonly known as SGK Heidelberg, is a German association football club from the Kirchheim district of the city of Heidelberg, Baden-Württemberg. The club's greatest success has been promotion to the Oberliga Baden-Württemberg on three occasions, in 1984, 1996 and 1998. It last played at this level in the 2000–01 season.

The club has also qualified for the DFB-Pokal, the German Cup, on two occasions courtesy to North Baden Cup wins.

== History ==
SG Heidelberg-Kirchheim was formed in 1945 but the roots of some of its department date back earlier. The gymnastic department dates back to 1879, when the TV 1879 Kirchheim was formed while the footballers originated in the Fußballgesellschaft, formed in 1910.

The club first reached the highest level of play in North Baden when it earned promotion to the tier three Amateurliga Nordbaden in 1952. After a fourth-place finish in its first season there it came sixteenth the year after and was relegated again. The club returned to this league in 1957 and played as a mid-table side until 1963, when it was once more relegated. It made an immediate return in 1964 but came last in the league in 1967 and dropped down again and did not return to this level until the league was disbanded in 1978.

SG Heidelberg-Kirchheim was not part of either the new Oberliga Baden-Württemberg or the Verbandsliga Baden below it when those leagues were formed in 1978 but gained promotion to the latter in 1980. It finished runners-up in its first season there but failed to win promotion. In 1984 it won the league and moved up to the Oberliga for the first time. In a five-season stint in the Oberliga Baden-Württemberg from 1984 to 1989 a seventh place in 1985–86 was the club's best result. After relegation back to the Verbandsliga the club remained a top side in this league, finishing runners-up on three occasions between 1996. During this era North Baden Cup wins in 1988 and 1992 qualified the SG Heidelberg-Kirchheim for the DFB-Pokal twice. In 1988–89 it lost 1–3 to Waldhof Mannheim and in 1992–93 it received a bye for the first round and lost 3–0 in the second to Hertha BSC II, a team that would go on to reach the cup final that season.

A runners-up finish in 1996 and success in the promotion round took the club back up to the Oberliga for a season before suffering relegation again. It returned after a league championship in 1998 and played three seasons there until 2001. In this era falls the club's greatest success in the Oberliga Baden-Württemberg when it finished third in 1999–2000. After returning to the Verbandsliga in 2001 he club entered a weaker era in this league, playing the next nine seasons as a mid-table side until relegation in 2010 forced it to drop to the Landesliga Rhein-Neckar. SG Heidelberg-Kirchheim recovered and returned to the Verbandsliga after two seasons in 2012 where it plays today.

== Honours ==
The club's honours:

=== League ===
- Verbandsliga Baden
  - Champions: 1984, 1998
  - Runners-up: 1981, 1991, 1992, 1996

=== Cup ===
- North Baden Cup
  - Winners: 1988, 1992
  - Runners-up: 2005

== Recent seasons ==
The recent season-by-season performance of the club:

Season	Division	Tier	Position
2003–04	Verbandsliga Baden	V	8th
2004–05	Verbandsliga Baden	V	11th
2005–06	Verbandsliga Baden	V	7th
2006–07	Verbandsliga Baden	V	11th
2007–08	Verbandsliga Baden	V	10th
2008–09	Verbandsliga Baden	VI	5th
2009–10	Verbandsliga Baden	VI	13th ↓
2010–11	Landesliga Rhein-Neckar	VII	3rd
2011–12	Landesliga Rhein-Neckar	VII	2nd ↑
2012–13	Verbandsliga Baden	VI	9th
2013–14	Verbandsliga Baden	VI	10th
2014–15	Verbandsliga Baden	VI	9th
2015–16	Verbandsliga Baden	VI	11th
2016–17	Verbandsliga Baden	VI	12th
2017–18	Verbandsliga Baden	VI	11th
2018–19	Verbandsliga Baden	VI	18th ↓

- With the introduction of the Regionalligas in 1994 and the 3. Liga in 2008 as the new third tier, below the 2. Bundesliga, all leagues below dropped one tier.

↑ Promoted	↓ Relegated
