= 1. FC Pforzheim =

German association football club

- Full name: 1. Fußball Club; Pforzheim 1896 e.V.
- Nickname(s): der Club
- Founded: 5 May 1896
- Dissolved: 30 June 2010
- Ground: Stadion im Brötzinger Tal
- Capacity: 10,000
- League: None
Home colours	Away colours

1. FC Pforzheim was a German association football club playing in Pforzheim, Baden-Württemberg. The club was established on 5 May 1896 and was a founding member of the German Football Association in Leipzig in 1900. In 2010 it merged with VfR Pforzheim to form 1. CfR Pforzheim.

== History ==
=== Early success ===
The club enjoyed most of its success in its early years. In 1906 they captured the championship of the Süddeutschland Verband (South German League) by beating Karlsruher FV, one of the era's most prominent sides. This put Pforzheim into the national playoff rounds where they defeated favoured side Cologne FC 99 4–2 in a quarter final match, before eliminating defending champions Berlin TuFC Union 4–0 in the semi-finals. With the win the club advanced to the final in Nuremberg where they lost a 1–2 decision to VfB Leipzig.

=== Interwar years ===
Pforzheim slipped to become a mid-table side until narrowly missing a chance to play in the playoff rounds of the Süddeutschland Verband in both 1913 and 1914: tied for first place, they finished second in both seasons on goal differential. World War I disrupted play in the country for several years and Pforzheim fell out of top-flight competition. They returned to, at first, the Kreisliga Südwest and then the Bezirksliga Württemberg-Baden in the early 20s before being relegated in 1926, and then earning their re-promotion in 1929.

In 1933 German football was reorganized under the Third Reich into sixteen first division Gauligen. 1. FC Pforzheim played in the Gauliga Baden through to 1944 with their best results coming as second-place finishes in 1936, 1938, and 1939. The club narrowly missed relegation in 1941 escaping only through the collapse of FC Birkenfeld. Play in the Gauliga Baden was disrupted and then ended in the 1944–45 season by the advance of Allied armies into Germany towards the end of World War II.

=== Postwar ===
After the war the club re-emerged in the 2. Oberliga Süd (II) playing there from 1950 to 1963, the year of the formation of the Bundesliga, Germany's first professional football league. League re-organization then saw Pforzheim in the Regionalliga Süd (II) from 1963 until 1967 when a crash from 7th to 18th place led to the team being relegated. Pforzheim's 17-year-long stay in the second division was the longest of any other team at the time. Their best result in this period was a third-place finish in 1963, just two points shy of TSG Ulm 1846, and an advance to Oberliga Süd (I).

In 1967, Pforzheim fell to the third division Amateurliga Nordbaden and spent a dozen seasons there before slipping again in 1979 to fourth-tier play. They returned to the Oberliga Baden-Württemberg (III) in 1985 and followed up their promotion with a Baden Cup win in 1987 leading to their first DFB-Pokal appearance in 1987–88. They progressed into the Round of 16 before being put out by Bundesliga side Werder Bremen (1–1, 1–3). A second Baden Cup win and DFB-Pokal appearance came in 1989. The team pulled off a surprise victory over Bundesliga side VfL Bochum in the second round of the 1989–90 DFB-Pokal. The side then captured a division title in 1991 and took part in the promotion rounds for the 2. Bundesliga, but were unable to advance.

League restructuring in 1994 saw the Oberliga Baden-Württemberg become a fourth-tier league with the introduction of the Regionalliga Süd (III) and Pforzheim's 10th-place finish left them behind in the lower division.

The team narrowly missed a return to third class football in 2001 when they once again finished just two points behind TSG Ulm 1846. By 2004, the association was a million Euros in debt and declared bankruptcy. The financially re-structured club was forced down to the Verbandsliga Nordbaden (V), but quickly recovered, and on the strength of their division championship in 2006 returned to play in the Oberliga Baden-Württemberg (IV) for a season before returning to the Verbandsliga.

In June 2010, the club merged with local rival VfR Pforzheim to form the 1. CfR Pforzheim.

== Honours ==
The club's honours:

=== League ===
- Southern German championship
  - Champions: 1906
- German football championship
  - Runners-up: 1906
- Kreisliga Südwest (I)
  - Champions: 1921, 1923
- Bezirksliga Baden (I)
  - Champions: 1932
- Gauliga Baden (I)
  - Runners-up: 1936, 1938, 1939
- Oberliga Baden-Württemberg (III)
  - Champions: 1991
- Verbandsliga Nordbaden (VI)
  - Champions: 1985, 2006
- Landesliga Nordbaden (II)
  - Champions: 1949

=== Cup ===
- North Baden Cup (Tiers III-VII)
  - Winners: 1987, 1989, 1993

== Recent seasons ==
The recent season-by-season performance of the club:

Season	Division	Tier	Position
1999–2000	Oberliga Baden-Württemberg	IV	7th
2000–01	Oberliga Baden-Württemberg	IV	2nd
2001–02	Oberliga Baden-Württemberg	IV	3rd
2002–03	Oberliga Baden-Württemberg	IV	12th
2003–04	Oberliga Baden-Württemberg	IV	19th ↓
2004–05	Verbandsliga Nordbaden	V	4th
2005–06	Verbandsliga Nordbaden	V	1st ↑
2006–07	Oberliga Baden-Württemberg	IV	16th ↓
2007–08	Verbandsliga Nordbaden	V	3rd
2008–09	Verbandsliga Nordbaden	VI	10th
2009–10	Verbandsliga Nordbaden	VI	6th

- With the introduction of the Regionalligas in 1994 and the 3. Liga in 2008 as the new third tier, below the 2. Bundesliga, all leagues below dropped one tier.

↑ Promoted	↓ Relegated
