= TSV Amicitia Viernheim =

German football club

- Full name: Turn- und Sportverein Amicitia 1906/09 Viernheim e.V.
- Founded: May 2008 (1906/09)
- Ground: Waldstadion Viernheim
- Capacity: 4,000
- Chairman: Edmund Scheidel
- League: Kreisliga Mannheim (VIII)
- 2016–17: Verbandsliga Baden (VI), 15th
Home colours	Away colours

The TSV Amicitia Viernheim is a German association football club from the city of Viernheim, Hesse. Due to the close proximity of Viernheim to Baden-Württemberg, the club plays in the league system of this state.

The club was formed in a merger of the SpVgg Amicitia Viernheim and the TSV Viernheim in May 2008. Amicitia is the Latin word for friendship.

== History ==
=== TSV Viernheim ===
Logo of predecessor side TSV Viernheim.

TSV was formed in 1906 as a football club, under the name of Fußballclub Sodalität Viernheim. After the First World War, the club joined the DJK organisation and expanded into other sports. With the rise of the Nazis to power in 1933, the club was outlawed due to its association with the Catholic Deutschen Jugendkraft but it was reformed in 1946.

Originally as TSV 1946, the club changed its name to TSV 1906, claiming its origins in the old club.

For most part of its history, it stood in the shadow of Amicitia as far as football is concerned. TSV gained promotion to the 2nd Amateurliga Rhein-Neckar (IV) in 1971, joined by Amicitia a year later. In 1974, it was relegated from this league again.

In 1986, it won promotion to the Landesliga Nordbaden-Staffel 2 (V), a league it won the season after.

The club played in the tier-four Verbandsliga Nordbaden for ten seasons from 1988 onwards, a fifth place in its first year being the best result. It returned to this league in 1999–2000 and from 2003 to 2006 but never came close to Oberliga promotion. Its last season before the merger, 2007–08, it spent in the Landesliga (VI) once more, alongside Amicitia.

=== SpVgg Amicitia Viernheim ===
Logo of predecessor side SpVgg Amicitia Viernheim.

Amicitia was formed in 1909, three years after the club the TSV claims as its origins. The club was always exclusively a football club, unlike TSV who functioned as a multi-sports club.

Amicitia first reached prominence when it gained promotion to the tier-one Bezirksliga Rhein-Saar in 1931. Despite a seventh place in the first season and a fourth in the second, the club could not qualify for the new Gauliga Baden in 1933.

After two years in the second tier, it regained its first division status in 1935 but was relegated from the Gauliga again immediately. Amicitia once more returned to this league for one season in 1939.

After the end of the Second World War, Amicitia was briefly renamed Grün-Weiß Viernheim due to all pre-1945 sport associations being outlawed. The club became part of the tier-two Landesliga Nordbaden, where it achieved a second place in the northern division of the league in 1948, qualifying for the promotion round to the Oberliga Süd, where it came last. After this season, the league was merged into one single division and Amicitia only managed a tenth place the following season. The year after, a seventh place was not enough to qualify the team for the new tier-two 2nd Oberliga Süd and it became part of what was now the Amateurliga Nordbaden.

Until 1953, the club remained a mid-table side in this league, after this, its fortunes took a turn for the better. Amicitia took out four league championships in a row from 1954 to 1957 but failed in the first three attempts to reach the second division. In 1954 and 1955, the club was outclassed by the Bavarian contestants VfL Neustadt, SpVgg Weiden and FC Penzberg. In 1956, SpVgg Neu-Isenburg and VfR Heilbronn finished ahead of the team who was only one win away from promotion. Finally, in 1957, the club was successful, winning promotion alongside Borussia Fulda. The club also qualified for the German amateur football championship, where it was knocked out in the semi-finals by Alemannia 90 Berlin.

In the 2nd Oberliga Süd for the next six seasons, the club achieved its best result, a sixth place, in its first season. After this, the team declined, narrowly avoiding relegation in 1961. In the last season of the Oberliga era, 1962–63, Amicitia performed well once more, earning a seventh place.

This was enough to maintain its second division status and the club was admitted to the new Regionalliga Süd, one of the five leagues below the new Fußball-Bundesliga. Amicitia was outclassed at this level and finished last in the league, being relegated back to the tier-three Amateurliga again. Its reserve team, Amicita Viernheim Amateure, played in the tier-four 2nd Amateurliga Rhein-Neckar for a seasons but had to be withdrawn from the league when the first team got relegated.

Upon return to this level, it earned a respectable third place in this league in its first season, followed by a second place the following year. After this, the club slipped to the bottom half of the league for the coming seasons, culminating in relegation from the league in 1972. Amicitia did not return to the Amateurliga until the league was renamed in 1978 and became the Verbandsliga Nordbaden. Instead, the club had to play in the 2nd Amateurliga Rhein-Neckar, alongside local rival TSV for the 1972–73 and 1973–74 seasons. It finished runners-up in the league in 1974. In 1977, the 2nd Amateurligas in North Baden were renamed Landesligas and reduced in number from five to three. Amicitia became part of the Landesliga Nordbaden-Staffel 2.

In 1980, a last place finish meant a further relegation for the club, now to the sixth tier of the league system. It took the club until 1984 to recover and return to the Landesliga.

After a lengthy absence, the club returned to North Baden's highest league, now on the fourth level of the German league system, in 1985, winning the Landesliga as a freshly promoted team. After a tenth place in its first season, it won the league in 1986–87 and earned promotion to the tier-three Oberliga Baden-Württemberg. Amicitia became something of an elevator team between those two leagues, winning promotion again in 1989, after having been relegated after only one season. Again, only lasting for one year, it returned to the Oberliga for a third time in 1994. This time, it lasted for two seasons but upon return to the Verbandsliga in 1996–97, it was handed straight down to the Landesliga.

The next ten seasons, Amicitia spent at the lower amateur level before making a Verbandsliga comeback in 2007. In the 2007–08 season, its last as an independent club, it came second in the league but failed in the promotion round, the Kehler FV earning promotion instead.

=== TSV Amicitia Viernheim ===
In April 2007, the two clubs, Amicitia and TSV, first publicly announced the idea of a merger. For legal reasons, the process was delayed and on 7 May 2008, a vote to decide about the merger plans was held. In it, 86% of all members voted in favor of the merger.

The new club was not a huge success in the Verbandsliga, existing as a mid-table side until 2012 when it was relegated to the Landesliga after coming 13th. After two seasons in the Landesliga in which the club came second and first it was promoted back to the Verbandsliga.

Following relegation from the Verbandsliga in 2017, the club withdrew its first team for personnel and financial reasons. The team players joined the Kreisliga for the 2018–19 season.

== Honours ==
=== SpVgg Amicitia Viernheim ===
- Amateurliga Nordbaden (III)
  - Champions: 1954, 1955, 1956, 1957
- Verbandsliga Nordbaden (IV)
  - Champions: 1987
- Landesliga Nordbaden-Staffel 2 (V-VI)
  - Champions: 1985, 2007
  - Runners-up: 2013
- Landesliga Rhein-Neckar (VI)
  - Champions: 2014

=== TSV Viernheim ===
- Landesliga Nordbaden-Staffel 2 (V)
  - Champions: 1988, 2003

== Recent seasons ==
The recent season-by-season performance of the club:

=== SpVgg Amicitia Viernheim ===
Season	Division	Tier	Position
2003–04	Kreisliga A Mannheim	VII	2nd
2004–05	Kreisliga A Mannheim	VII	6th
2005–06	Kreisliga A Mannheim	VII	1st ↑
2006–07	Landesliga Nordbaden-Staffel 2	VI	1st ↑
2007–08	Verbandsliga Nordbaden	V	2nd

=== TSV Viernheim ===
Season	Division	Tier	Position
1999–2000	Verbandsliga Nordbaden	V	16th ↓
2000–01	Landesliga Nordbaden-Staffel 2	VI	
2001–02		VI	
2002–03	Landesliga Nordbaden-Staffel 2	VI	1st ↑
2003–04	Verbandsliga Nordbaden	V	12th
2004–05	Verbandsliga Nordbaden	V	10th
2005–06	Verbandsliga Nordbaden	V	13th ↓
2006–07	Landesliga Nordbaden-Staffel 2	VI	5th
2007–08	Landesliga Nordbaden-Staffel 2	VI	3rd

=== TSV Amicitia Viernheim ===
Season	Division	Tier	Position
2008–09	Verbandsliga Nordbaden	VI	12th
2009–10	Verbandsliga Nordbaden	VI	9th
2010–11	Verbandsliga Nordbaden	VI	11th
2011–12	Verbandsliga Nordbaden	VI	13th ↓
2012–13	Landesliga Nordbaden-Staffel 2	VII	2nd
2013–14	Landesliga Nordbaden-Staffel 2	VII	1st ↑
2014–15	Verbandsliga Nordbaden	VI	4th
2015–16	Verbandsliga Baden	VI	4th
2016–17	Verbandsliga Baden	VI	15th ↓
2017–18	Inactive		
2018–19	Kreisliga Mannheim	VIII	

- With the introduction of the Regionalligas in 1994 and the 3. Liga in 2008 as the new third tier, below the 2. Bundesliga, all leagues below dropped one tier.

↑ Promoted	↓ Relegated
