= Deutscher Sportclub für Fußballstatistiken =

German football statistics publisher

The Deutscher Sportclub für Fußballstatistiken e.V., (English: German sports club for football statistics) short DSFS is an association dedicated to collecting and publishing German football statistics, similar to the RSSSF, and is a member of the German Olympic Society.

The club used to be best known for its annual publication, the Deutscher Fussball-Almanach, a yearbook on German football. Unlike other yearbooks, it does not so much focus on professional football, but rather covers the higher amateur leagues.

== History ==
The DSFS was formed on 1 July 1971 but was only registered in 1979. It was formed by six football enthusiasts after Helmut Druwen posted an add in the kicker sport magazine looking for people interested in football statistics. Having grown to a membership of 50, another add in the kicker in 1978 pushed the membership drive ahead and in 1979 the club finally became properly registered, joining the German Olympic Society as well.

From 1980, the club started publishing brochures and a club magazine. But after 1983, the DSFS went into decline for the first time, recovering only in 1986 from several years of inactivity.

With the re-establishment of the Regionalliga in German football in 1994, a reform of the club's annual publication was started. Year by year until 2004 the contents was expanded until covering all divisions of German football on the top five levels including the top youth and women's leagues. Consequently, the name of this annual publication was changed to Deutschlands Fussball in Zahlen (English: Germany's football by numbers).

In 1998, it was declared Gemeinnützig, similar to a Non-profit organization, which entitles German clubs to certain tax benefits. In 2004, the number of members was at its peak with almost 430 members. Since then the club lost several of them and now has approximately 378 members (2023 census).

As of September 2022, the club's president is Michael Diepenbrock.

== See also ==
- International Federation of Football History & Statistics
- RSSSF
