= SC Geislingen =

German football club

- Full name: Sport-Club Geislingen 1900 e.V.
- Founded: 1 June 1900
- Ground: Stadion im Eybacher Tal
- Capacity: 6,000
- Manager: Andreas Strehle
- Coach: Uli Haug
- League: Landesliga Württemberg 2 (VII)
- 2015–16: 5th
- Website: http://www.sc-geislingen.de/
Home colours	Away colours

SC Geislingen is a German association football club from the city of Geislingen, Baden-Württemberg established 31 May 1900. The football department became independent on 1 July 1911 and later took on the name Fußballverein 1919 Geislingen. In the years immediately before and after World War II, Geislingen flirted with promotion to first and second division football, but failed to advance in three attempts, instead remaining a third or fourth tier side until the mid-1990s.

The club's best known player was Jürgen Klinsmann, who spend four years of his youth career at SC Geislingen from 1974 to 1978, before joining Stuttgarter Kickers.

== History ==
German football was reorganized into 15 regional top-flight divisions in 1933 and at the end of the 1936–37 season SC took part in group qualification play for the Gauliga Württemberg (I), but failed to advance after finishing fifth in their group.

After the war, sports and football clubs across the country were dissolved by occupying Allied authorities as part of the process of denazification. The club was reestablished in May 1946 as SC Geislingen and became part of the Amateurliga Württemberg (III) in 1952 and, later in 1960, the Amateurliga Nordwürttemberg. Following a first-place result in 1959 and a second-place finish the next season, the team took part in promotion playoffs for the 2. Liga-Süd (II), but did poorly on both occasions, and missed advancing.

SC struggled through the 1970s, moving up and down between Amateurliga and Verbandsliga play. By the mid-1980s they had settled in as a lower table side in what had become the Amateuroberliga Baden-Württemberg (III), with the exception of the 1986–87 and 1991–92 seasons spent in the Verbandsliga Württemberg (IV).

The team has made three appearances (1982, 1985, 1990) in play for the DFB Pokal (German Cup). Their best run came in 1985 when they upset Bundesliga side Hamburger SV (2:0) in the opening round and then defeated Kickers Offenbach (4:2) before being put out by a second Bundesliga club, Bayer Uerdingen, (0:2) in the third round as that club made its way to the cup final where they beat Bayern Munich.

Geislingen dropped out of the Oberliga in 1996 and out of the Verbandsliga two years later and has been unable to reach former heights since then.

== Former players ==
- (Germany) Thorsten Walther

== Honours ==
The club's honours:

- Verbandsliga Württemberg
  - Champions: 1987
- Bezirksliga Neckar/Fils (VIII)
  - Champions: 2011
  - Runners up: 1984, 1992
- Württemberg Cup
  - Winners: 1984, 1989

== Recent seasons ==
The recent season-by-season performance of the club:

Season	Division	Tier	Position
1999–2000	Landesliga Württemberg		11th
2000–01	Landesliga Württemberg		16th ↓
2001–02	Bezirksliga Neckar/Fils		10th
2002–03	Bezirksliga Neckar/Fils		1st ↑
2003–04	Landesliga Württemberg 2	VI	2nd
2004–05	Landesliga Württemberg 2	VI	7th
2005–06	Landesliga Württemberg 2	VI	14th ↓
2006–07	Bezirksliga Neckar/Fils	VII	2nd
2007–08	Bezirksliga Neckar/Fils	VII	3rd
2008–09	Bezirksliga Neckar/Fils	VIII	3rd
2009–10	Bezirksliga Neckar/Fils	VIII	6th
2010–11	Bezirksliga Neckar/Fils	VIII	1st ↑
2011–12	Landesliga Württemberg 2	VII	7th
2012–13	Landesliga Württemberg 2	VII	6th
2013–14	Landesliga Württemberg 2	VII	4th
2014–15	Landesliga Württemberg 2	VII	5th
2015–16	Landesliga Württemberg 2	VII	5th
2016–17	Landesliga Württemberg 2	VII	

- With the introduction of the Regionalligas in 1994 and the 3. Liga in 2008 as the new third tier, below the 2. Bundesliga, all leagues below dropped one tier.

↑ Promoted	↓ Relegated
