= TSG Weinheim =

German football club

Coordinates: 49.5285°N 8.646°E

- Full name: Turn- und Sportgemeinde 1862 Weinheim e.V.
- Founded: 1862
- Ground: Sepp-Herberger-Stadion
- Capacity: 9,000
- Manager: Dirk Jörns
- League: Verbandsliga Nordbaden (VI)
- 2015–16: 2nd
Home colours	Away colours

TSG Weinheim is a German association football club from the city of Weinheim, Baden-Württemberg. The origins of the club go back to the founding on 20 August 1862 of the gymnastics club Turnverein Weinheim.

== History ==
In 1878 the club split into two branches with the formation of TV II Weinheim. The breakaway club took on the name Turngenossenschaft Weinheim in 1883 before becoming Turngenossenschaft Jahn 1878 Weinheim in 1907. On 29 June 1946, parent club TV Weinheim was reunited with TGS Jahn Weinheim and was also joined by DJK Schwarz-Weiß 1923 Weinheim to form TSG 1862 Weinheim.

Throughout its early history the Weinheim club remained an anonymous side in lower tier local competition. Following a 1994 Landesliga Nordbaden (V) title win TSG broke through to the Amateurliga Nordbaden (IV) where they played as a middling side over the next four seasons.

In 1990, the club formed an American Football department, the Weinheim Longhorns.

In 1998 another local club, FV Weinheim, failed financially and its football department subsequently became part of TSG. The new team took to the field under the name TSG Weinheim 62/09 and advanced to play in the Oberliga Baden-Württemberg (IV) in 1999. They were sent down after a 15th-place result, and over the next four seasons repeated the cycle of promotion followed by immediate relegation. Between 2004 and 2009 the team played as part of the Verbandsliga Nordbaden and returned to the now fifth tier Oberliga Baden-Württemberg in 2009. The club was relegated from the Oberliga again in 2011.

Since then the club took part in the promotion round to the Oberliga twice after finishing runner-up in the Verbandsliga, in 2012 and 2016, but on both occasions was unsuccessful.

== Honours ==
- Verbandsliga Nordbaden
  - Champions: 1999, 2001, 2003, 2009

== Recent managers ==
Recent managers of the club:

Manager	Start	Finish
Dirk Anders	1 July 2004	30 June 2007
Rüdiger Menges	19 June 2007	30 June 2008
Dieter Heimen	1 July 2008	31 June 2010
Sascha Noe	2 July 2010	Present

== Recent seasons ==
The recent season-by-season performance of the club:

Season	Division	Tier	Position
1999–2000	Oberliga Baden-Württemberg	IV	15th ↓
2000–01	Verbandsliga Baden	V	1st ↑
2001–02	Oberliga Baden-Württemberg	IV	16th ↓
2002–03	Verbandsliga Baden	V	1st ↑
2003–04	Oberliga Baden-Württemberg	IV	18th ↓
2004–05	Verbandsliga Baden	V	6th
2005–06	Verbandsliga Baden	V	3rd
2006–07	Verbandsliga Baden	V	2nd
2007–08	Verbandsliga Baden	V	4th
2008–09	Verbandsliga Baden	VI	1st ↑
2009–10	Oberliga Baden-Württemberg	V	5th
2010–11	Oberliga Baden-Württemberg	V	16th ↓
2011–12	Verbandsliga Baden	VI	2nd
2012–13	Verbandsliga Baden	VI	5th
2013–14	Verbandsliga Baden	VI	11th
2014–15	Verbandsliga Baden	VI	5th
2015–16	Verbandsliga Baden	VI	2nd
2016–17	Verbandsliga Baden	VI	

- With the introduction of the Regionalligas in 1994 and the 3. Liga in 2008 as the new third tier, below the 2. Bundesliga, all leagues below dropped one tier.

↑ Promoted	↓ Relegated
