= VfR Pforzheim =

German football club

- Full name: Verein für Rasenspiele; Pforzheim e.V.
- Nickname: Die Rassler
- Founded: 1897
- Dissolved: 30 June 2010
- Ground: Stadion Holzhof
- Capacity: 10,000
- League: Defunct
Home colours	Away colours

The VfR Pforzheim was a German association football club from the city of Pforzheim, Baden-Württemberg. The club achieved notability by playing in Germany's second division in the 1965–66 season. In 2010. the club merged with 1. FC Pforzheim to form 1. CfR Pforzheim.

Apart from football, the club also operates an ice hockey team in the Landesliga Baden-Württemberg, the VfR Blue Gold Stars.

== History ==
=== Early years ===
The club was formed in 1897 under the name of FC Alemania Pforzheim. Pforzheim was then a leading city in the development of German football and had, with the 1. FC Pforzheim, already a strong club. In 1906, two more football clubs were formed in Pforzheim, the FC Viktoria and Phönix. These later two merged with Alemania to form VfR on 12 September 1912. In 1919, a fourth club joined this merger, the FC Oststadt.

From the beginning, the VfR, then Alemania, stood in the shadow of the 1.FCP. While the later played in the tier-one Südkreis-Liga, Alemania played in the second division, then the B-Klasse Mittelbaden. In 1911–12, out of 17 clubs in two divisions in this league, seven came from Pforzheim, including the three sides that would merge at the end of it to become VfR.

=== Post-First World War ===
Despite the merger in 1912, VfR could not rise to the highest level in the region before the First World War, but, in 1919, football in the region was reorganised and the club became part of the new Kreisliga Südwest. It played at this level for three seasons before suffering relegation in 1922. VfR was unable to rise to the highest level again in the following era of the Bezirksliga Württemberg-Baden, from 1923 to 1933 and only returned to division one in 1943, when the Gauliga Baden had become the top tier in the region.

=== Post-Second World War ===
After the Second World War, the club became part of the tier-two Landesliga Nordbaden. VfR played at this level with some success, winning the southern group of the league in 1948. In 1950, the Landesliga Nordbaden became the Amateurliga Nordbaden and, because of the creation of the 2. Oberliga Süd, was now only the third tier of the league system. VfR was relegated from the league in 1952, slipping to the tier-four 2. Amateurliga Mittelbaden.

The club recovered immediately and returned to the Amateurliga the following season but lasted only two years before having to drop down again. Once more, it took out the local division championship and return to the third tier, this time establishing itself more permanently. In 1959, it managed to win the Amateurliga Nordbaden and came close to promotion to the 2. Oberliga. On equal points with FC Singen 04 and SpVgg Bayreuth who were first and second in the five team promotion round, it lost both deciders for promotion in extra time and the other two clubs went up instead.

The club remained a top team in the league despite this disappointment, coming third, second and second in the following three seasons. After lesser performances in 1963 and 1964, the club came second once more in 1964–65. Because the league's champions, the second team of Karlsruher SC, was ineligible for promotion, VfR took part in it instead and succeeded.

In its sole season in the tier-two Regionalliga Süd, 1965–66, the club was heavily outclassed and came last with only eleven points to its name, 122 goals against and a 16-point gap to the second-last SpVgg Weiden.

Back in the Amateurliga the following season, the team finished fourth and continued to archive upper-table finishes in the coming years. In 1974 however, VfR came second-last and was relegated to the 2. Amateurliga once more. Like in the past, it won its local division but failed to gain promotion when it lost to VfB Bretten in the promotion round. The year after, it was more successful and regained its Amateurliga Nordbaden status. Also, in 1975–76 and 1976–77, it took part in the German Cup, exiting both times in the first round.

A reorganisation of German football in 1978 meant, that the Oberliga Baden-Württemberg became the new third tier of football in the region. The Amateurliga was renamed Verbandsliga Nordbaden and slipped to fourth tier. VfR had to finish in the top five of its league in 1977–78 to qualify for the new Oberliga but, coming eighth, was grouped in the Verbandsliga instead.

=== 1978 to 1995 ===
The club became a fixture in the Verbandsliga until 1987, when it was relegated to the tier-five Landesliga Nordbaden-Staffel 3. It spent the next two seasons at this level, earning promotion in 1989. After this, the club's ambitions almost ruined it. After three seasons in the Verbandsliga, it took out the league title there in 1992 and was promoted to the Oberliga. After a difficult first year, it performed well in the 1993–94 season, coming fifth. The season after saw it finish second in the league and earning the right to compete in the promotion round to the tier-three Regionalliga Süd. The club managed to beat SpVgg Bayreuth 4–0 but then lost 1–3 to Eintracht Frankfurt Amateure, ending all dreams.

=== 1995 onwards ===
The club's finances were in a disastrous state and it had to withdraw from the Oberliga, taking up the place of its reserve team in the Bezirksliga (VII) instead. It lost all its first team players and all but four of its second team. Despite this difficult situation, it archived a ninth place in its league in 1995–96 and unexpectedly avoided relegation.

The club suffered relegation from the Landesliga (VI) in 2008, dropping to the Kreisliga Pforzheim. Because of the introduction of the 3. Liga, this meant, it fell from tier six to tier eight.

== Honours ==
The club's honours:

- Landesliga Nordbaden (Southern Division) (II)
  - Champions: 1948
- Amateurliga Nordbaden (III)
  - Champions: 1959
- Verbandsliga Nordbaden (IV)
  - Champions: 1992
- 2. Amateurliga Mittelbaden (IV)
  - Champions: 1953, 1956, 1975, 1977
- Landesliga Nordbaden-Staffel 3 (V)
  - Champions: 1989

== Recent seasons ==
The recent season-by-season performance of the club:

Season	Division	Tier	Position
2002–03	Landesliga Mittelbaden	VI	3rd
2003–04	Landesliga Mittelbaden	VI	7th
2004–05	Landesliga Mittelbaden	VI	9th
2005–06	Landesliga Mittelbaden	VI	6th
2006–07	Landesliga Mittelbaden	VI	9th
2007–08	Landesliga Mittelbaden	VI	15th ↓
2008–09	Kreisliga Pforzheim	VIII	3rd
2009–10	Kreisliga Pforzheim	VIII	2nd

- With the introduction of the Regionalligas in 1994 and the 3. Liga in 2008 as the new third tier, below the 2. Bundesliga, all leagues below dropped one tier.

↑ Promoted	↓ Relegated
