= FV Lauda =

German football club

- Full name: Fußballverein 1913 Lauda e. V.
- Founded: 1913
- Ground: Tauberstadion
- Capacity: 5,000
- League: Verbandsliga Baden (VI)
- 2015–16: 5th
Home colours	Away colours

FV Lauda is a German association football club from the city of Lauda-Königshofen, Baden-Württemberg, established on 28 March 1913. It briefly became part of Turnverein Lauda in 1920 before becoming independent again on 5 June 1923.

== History ==
Throughout the late 1970s and into the 1980s, FV fielded strong sides in the Verbandsliga Baden (V) and managed to break through to play as part of the Oberliga Baden-Württemberg (IV) on three separate occasions in 1981, 1985, and 1997.

Following their 1980 Baden Cup win, Lauda made its only appearance in play for the DFB Pokal (German Cup), where they were put out in the opening round by VfB Oldenburg (1:2).

The team's longest turn in Oberliga play was from 1997 to 2006, which included a second-place finish in 2000. The club struggled on being relegated to the Verbandsliga in 2006, earning only lower table finishes there, and was sent down to the Landesliga Odenwald (VII) after a 15th-place result in 2011. A championship at this level in 2015, when the club remained undefeated all season and won 28 of its 30-season games, took the club back up to the Verbandsliga.

== Honours ==
The club's honours:

=== League ===
- Verbandsliga Baden
  - Champions: 1981, 1985, 1997
- Landesliga Odenwald
  - Champions: 2015

=== Cup ===
- North Baden Cup
  - Winners: 1980
  - Runners-up: 1997, 2000

== Recent seasons ==
The recent season-by-season performance of the club:

Season	Division	Tier	Position
1999–2000	Oberliga Baden-Württemberg	IV	2nd
2000–01	Oberliga Baden-Württemberg	IV	5th
2001–02	Oberliga Baden-Württemberg	IV	10th
2002–03	Oberliga Baden-Württemberg	IV	6th
2003–04	Oberliga Baden-Württemberg	IV	13th
2004–05	Oberliga Baden-Württemberg	IV	13th
2005–06	Oberliga Baden-Württemberg	IV	17th ↓
2006–07	Verbandsliga Baden	V	8th
2007–08	Verbandsliga Baden	V	14th
2008–09	Verbandsliga Baden	VI	8th
2009–10	Verbandsliga Baden	VI	12th
2010–11	Verbandsliga Baden	VI	15th ↓
2011–12	Landesliga Odenwald	VII	10th
2012–13	Landesliga Odenwald	VII	3rd
2013–14	Landesliga Odenwald	VII	2nd
2014–15	Landesliga Odenwald	VII	1st ↑
2015–16	Verbandsliga Baden	VI	5th
2016–17	Verbandsliga Baden	VI	

- With the introduction of the Regionalligas in 1994 and the 3. Liga in 2008 as the new third tier, below the 2. Bundesliga, all leagues below dropped one tier.

↑ Promoted	↓ Relegated
