= FV 09 Weinheim =

FV Weinheim
- Full name: Fußballverein 09 Weinheim e.V.
- Founded: 1909
- Ground: Sepp-Herberger-Stadion
- League: defunct
Home colours	Away colours

FV Weinheim was a German association football club from the city of Weinheim, Baden-Württemberg. Established in 1909, the team was active until declaring bankruptcy in 1997. The footballers of FV left to become part of TSG Weinheim with the combined side still active as of 2011, playing as TSG 62/09 Weinheim.

The club's most notable moment came on 4 August 1990, when the amateur side beat FC Bayern Munich 1–0 in the first round of the German Cup in Weinheim in front of 8,000 spectators. It was the first time since Bayern's debut in the German Cup in 1957 that the club had been knocked out in the opening round of the competition and was promptly repeated the following year against FC Homburg.

== History ==
The club first came to note in the early 1930s and in 1933 missed an opportunity to advance to first division Gauliga Baden when they were beaten in a playoff by MFC 08 Lindenhof.

Following World War II, FV were part of lower-tier competition until advancing in 1951 to the Amateurliga Nordbaden (III) where they played only a single season before being sent down on goal difference. They won their way back to the Amateurliga in 1954, where they spent five seasons. FV again returned to the Amateurliga in 1962 and captured the division title that year to begin the most successful period in the club's history. They repeated as champions in 1970 and narrowly missed advancing to the Regionalliga Süd (II) when they finished second in their playoff group.

In 1972, they took part in the opening round of the German amateur championship, but were put out in the first round by Normannia Gmünd. The team made their first appearance in play for the DFB Pokal (German Cup) in 1974 losing 2:4 in extra time to second division side Bayer 05 Uerdingen. The following season they were resoundingly beaten by Hertha Berlin 1:7 in the opening round of the competition.

In 1978, the four Amateurligen in Baden-Württemberg were merged to form the Amateur-Oberliga Baden-Württemberg (III). FV became part of this new twenty team circuit after failed a 2nd Bundesliga Süd (II) qualification playoff. Early on the club enjoyed a string of top four finishes, but crashed to 16th place in 1982, and was relegated to the Verbandsliga Nordbaden (IV) for a single season. Despite their poor league showing, they enjoyed their first DFB Pokal success, defeating SpVgg 07 Ludwigsburg 2:1 in extra time, before going out in the second round to VfL Osnabrück.

Weinheim struggled somewhat on their return until capturing the Amateur-Oberliga title in 1988. However, they failed again in their subsequent attempt to win promotion to the 2nd Bundesliga. This disappointment was lessened somewhat in August 1990 when they knocked first division side Bayern Munich, which lined up with five winners of the Italy 1990 World Cup, out of the DFB Pokal with a 1:0 win in the first round. After a tackle by Jürgen Kohler in the 28th minute Stephan Baumann fell to the ground and the referee awarded a soft penalty which was converted by Thomas Schwechheimer. In the next round FV went out to second division Rot-Weiss Essen

Decline came in the early 1990s as match attendance fell and the team descended to Verbandsliga play where they would meet historical local rivals TSG Weinheim. In 1997–98, FV slipped into bankruptcy and had to abandon their place in league play. The footballers of FV and TSG fielded a combined side the following season, playing as TSG 62/09 Weinheim. That team won promotion to Oberliga (IV) competition in 2000 and has played a handful of Oberliga (IV-V) seasons between 2000 and 2011.

== Honours ==
The club's honours:

=== League ===
- Oberliga Baden-Württemberg
  - Champions: 1988
- Amateurliga Nordbaden
  - Champions: 1963, 1970, 1978
- 2. Amateurliga Rhein-Neckar Staffel II
  - Champions: 1951, 1954, 1962

=== Cup ===
- North Baden Cup
  - Winners: 1975, 1990
