= SpVgg Neckarelz =

German football club

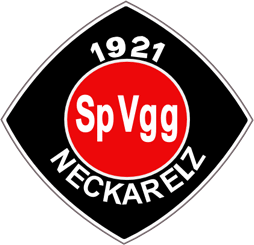
- Full name: Spielvereinigung Neckarelz e.V.
- Founded: 1921
- Ground: Elzstadion
- Capacity: 4,500
- Chairman: Thomas Ulmer
- Manager: Peter Hogen
- League: Landesliga Odenwald (VII)
- 2017–18: Verbandsliga Baden (VI), 13th (relegated)
Home colours	Away colours

SpVgg Neckarelz is a German association football club from the city of Neckarelz, Baden-Württemberg, playing in the Verbandsliga Baden.

== History ==
The club was established in June 1921 as Fußballverein Neckarelz and was renamed Spielvereinigung Neckarelz in April 1930. The club reached its highest level of play when they advanced to the Amateurliga Nordbaden (III) in 1974. They played four seasons at that level before failing to qualify for the new Amateuroberliga Baden-Württemberg formed in 1979 out of the four separate circuits then existing in the state. Their best result came as a 6th-place finish in 1977. SpVgg has appeared twice in play for the DFB Pokal, the German Cup, going out in the first round 1:6 to Freiburger FC in 1979, and 1:3 to Bayern Munich in 2010.

Following a Verbandliga (VI) title in 2010, Neckarelz became part of the Oberliga Baden-Württemberg, where they competed until 2013, when a league championship earned the club promotion to the Regionalliga Südwest. After three Regionalliga seasons Neckarelz was relegated back to the Oberliga again in 2016.

== Current squad ==
As of 1 February 2016

Note: Flags indicate national team as defined under FIFA eligibility rules; some limited exceptions apply. Players may hold more than one non-FIFA nationality.

No.	Pos.	Nation	Player
1	GK	GER	Mario Miltner
2	DF	GER	Tim Eiben
3	DF	GER	Claus Bückle
4	DF	TUR	Ugurtan Kizilyar
5	DF	GER	Niklas Tasky
6	DF	GER	Tim Grupp
7	MF	GER	Claudio Bellanave
8	MF	GER	Christian Schäfer
9	FW	TUR	Ugur Beyazal
10	FW	GER	Danny Galm
11	FW	GER	Abedin Krasniqi
12	GK	TUR	Volkan Tekin
13	FW	GER	Bogdan Müller
14	FW	CRO	Mario Cancar

No.	Pos.	Nation	Player
15	FW	GER	Henrik Hogen
16	MF	GER	Marius Klotz
17	DF	GER	Jonas Kiermeier
18	MF	GER	Manuel Hofmann
19	DF	GER	Daniel Schwind
20	FW	GER	Maximilian Albrecht
21	DF	GER	Benjamin Schäfer
22	MF	GER	Fabian Gondorf
23	DF	GER	Tobias Keusch
24	DF	GER	Denis Bindnagel
25	GK	GER	Denis Deter
28	MF	GER	Marcel Abele
33	MF	GER	Maurice Müller

== Honours ==
The club's honours:

- Oberliga Baden-Württemberg
  - Champions: 2013
- Verbandsliga Nordbaden
  - Champions: 2010
  - Runners up: 1979
- Landesliga Odenwald
  - Champions: 2006
  - Runners up: 2004
- North Baden Cup
  - Winners: 2009
  - Runners-up: 2012, 2016

== Recent seasons ==
The recent season-by-season performance of the club:

Season	Division	Tier	Position
2003–04	Landesliga Odenwald	VI	2nd ↑
2004–05	Verbandsliga Nordbaden	V	17th ↓
2005–06	Landesliga Odenwald	VI	1st ↑
2006–07	Verbandsliga Nordbaden	V	14th
2007–08	Verbandsliga Nordbaden	V	9th
2008–09	Verbandsliga Nordbaden	VI	4th
2009–10	Verbandsliga Nordbaden	VI	1st ↑
2010–11	Oberliga Baden-Württemberg	V	4th
2011–12	Oberliga Baden-Württemberg	V	3rd
2012–13	Oberliga Baden-Württemberg	V	1st ↑
2013–14	Regionalliga Südwest	IV	9th
2014–15	Regionalliga Südwest	IV	12th
2015–16	Regionalliga Südwest	IV	17th ↓
2016–17	Oberliga Baden-Württemberg	V	18th ↓
2017–18	Verbandsliga Baden	VI	13th ↓

- With the introduction of the Regionalligas in 1994 and the 3. Liga in 2008 as the new third tier, below the 2. Bundesliga, all leagues below dropped one tier.

=== Key ===
↑ Promoted	↓ Relegated

== Stadium ==
The club plays its home games at the Elzstadion, which has a capacity of 4,500 and was opened in 1963.
