= VfB Eppingen =

German Association football club

- Full name: VfB Eppingen 1921 e.V.
- Founded: 1921
- Ground: Hugo-Koch-Stadion
- Chairman: Steffen Häffner
- League: Verbandsliga Nordbaden (VI)
- 2023–24: Verbandsliga Nordbaden, 6th
Home colours	Away colours

VfB Eppingen is a German association football club based in Eppingen, Baden-Württemberg with a membership of about 450 people.

== History ==
The club has its roots in the sports club Turnverein 1865 Eppingen whose primary focus was gymnastics and formed a football side around 1910. At the end of World War I, footballers received some tutoring from an unlikely source in the form of an English officer in charge of prisoners-of-war locally. VfB Eppingen was established as a separate club devoted to football in 1921 and went on to win the local Gau title in 1925.

Eppingen enjoyed a successful decade in the 1970s beginning with a 2.Amateur Liga Rhein-Neckar championship in 1973 and following up with Amateurliga Nordbaden titles in 1974 and 1979. A highlight of the club's history in this period was their 2:1 win over Hamburger SV in the 1974–75 German Cup, commonly dubbed the "mother of all cup sensations", which was part of their run through first three rounds of the competition to the Achtelfinale (round of 16) where they were finally put out 0:2 by Werder Bremen. Eppingen continued its cup run to the fourth round, where it lost to Werder Bremen. Eppingen's series of regional league wins culminated in a rapid move up through the Oberliga Baden-Württemberg to the 2nd Bundesliga Süd for a single season in 1980–81, when the club finished second in the Oberliga, behind VfB Stuttgart II. The club finished last in the 2nd Bundesliga and was relegated back to the Oberliga, where another straight relegation put the club back in the Verbandsliga Nordbaden.

The team played one more season in the Oberliga Baden-Württemberg (III) in 1990–91. Since then, the club has been fluctuating between Verbandsliga and Landesliga. In 2003, the club fell as far as the tier-VII Bezirksliga but rebounded impressively, winning their division with 25 wins, five draws and no loss in 2003–04. After that, the club had been playing in the Landesliga, interrupted by two seasons in the Verbandsliga, before making another return to the Verbandsliga in 2013. Another relegation from the Verbandsliga meant VfB would return to the Landesliga in 2014 where it won a league championship in 2015–16 and was promoted.

== Honors ==
The club's honours:

=== League ===
- Oberliga Baden-Württemberg (III)
  - Runners-up: 1980
- Amateurliga Nordbaden (III)
  - Champions: 1975
- Verbandsliga Nordbaden (IV)
  - Champions: 1979, 1990
- Landesliga Rhein-Neckar (VII)
  - Champions: 2013, 2016
  - Runners-up: 2005

=== Cup ===
- North Baden Cup
  - Winners: 1973, 1974

== Recent seasons ==
The recent season-by-season performance of the club:

Season	Division	Tier	Position
1999–2000	Verbandsliga Nordbaden	V	13th
2000–01	Verbandsliga Nordbaden	V	14th ↓
2001–02	Landesliga Rhein-Neckar	VI	11th
2002–03	Landesliga Rhein-Neckar	VI	14th ↓
2003–04	Bezirksliga Sinsheim	VII	1st ↑
2004–05	Landesliga Rhein-Neckar	VI	2nd ↑
2005–06	Verbandsliga Nordbaden	V	10th
2006–07	Verbandsliga Nordbaden	V	15th ↓
2007–08	Landesliga Rhein-Neckar	VI	4th
2008–09	Landesliga Rhein-Neckar	VII	3rd
2009–10	Landesliga Rhein-Neckar	VII	2nd
2010–11	Landesliga Rhein-Neckar	VII	2nd
2011–12	Landesliga Rhein-Neckar	VII	5th
2012–13	Landesliga Rhein-Neckar	VII	1st ↑
2013–14	Verbandsliga Nordbaden	VI	14th ↓
2014–15	Landesliga Rhein-Neckar	VII	5th
2015–16	Landesliga Rhein-Neckar	VII	1st ↑
2016–17	Verbandsliga Nordbaden	VI	

- With the introduction of the Regionalligas in 1994 and the 3. Liga in 2008 as the new third tier, below the 2. Bundesliga, all leagues below dropped one tier.

↑ Promoted	↓ Relegated
