= 2. Oberliga Süd =

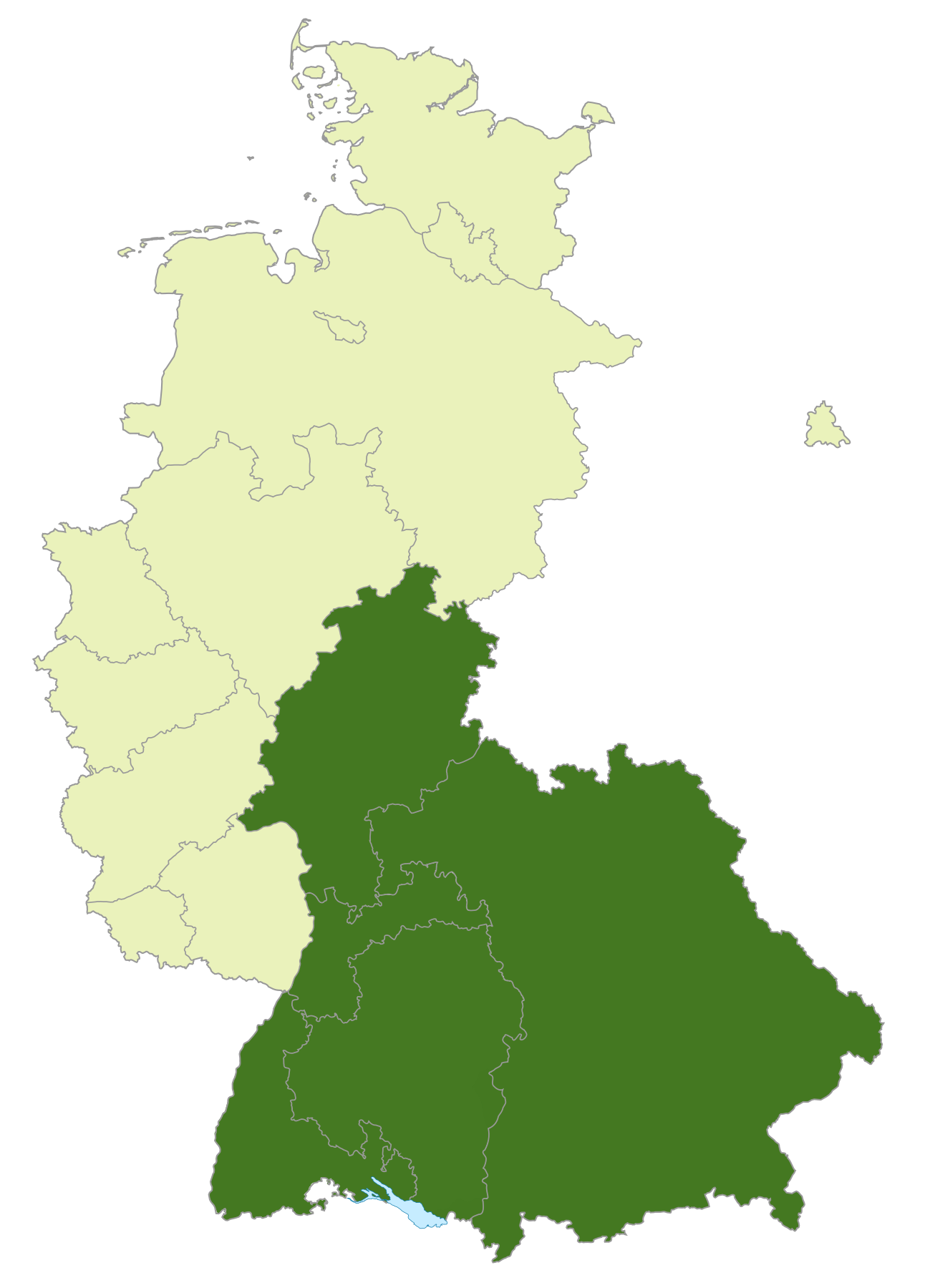
- Founded: 1950
- Folded: 1963 (13 seasons)
- Replaced by: Regionalliga Süd
- Country: Germany
- State: Bavaria; Baden-Württemberg; Hesse
- Level on pyramid: Level 2
- Promotion to: Oberliga Süd
- Relegation to: Amateurliga Bayern; Amateurliga Hessen; Amateurliga Nordbaden; Amateurliga Südbaden; Amateurliga Württemberg; Amateurliga Schwarzwald-Bodensee (from 1960)
- Last champions: FSV Frankfurt (1962–63)

The 2. Oberliga Süd was the second-highest level of the German football league system in the south of Germany from 1950 until the formation of the Bundesliga in 1963. It covered the three states of Bavaria, Baden-Württemberg and Hesse.

== Overview ==
The 2. Oberliga Süd was formed in 1950 as a feeder league to the Oberliga Süd which had been operating since 1945. It was the second of the three second Oberligas, the other two being 2. Oberliga West (1949) and 2. Oberliga Südwest (1951).

The winners and runners-up of this league were promoted to the Oberliga Süd, the bottom two teams relegated to the Amateurligas. Below the 2nd Oberliga were the following Amateurligas:

- Amateurliga Bayern (split into northern and southern group from 1953)
- Amateurliga Hessen
- Amateurliga Württemberg (split into two groups from 1960)
- Amateurliga Nordbaden
- Amateurliga Südbaden

The 1. FC Pforzheim was the only club to have played all 13 seasons in the league.

== Disbanding of the 2. Oberliga ==
In 1963 the league was dissolved. The teams on the places one to nine went to the new Regionalliga Süd, the new second division. The teams from 10 to 18 were relegated to the Amateurligas.

The following teams were admitted to the new Regionalliga:

- FSV Frankfurt
- ESV Ingolstadt
- SV Waldhof Mannheim
- 1. FC Pforzheim
- Freiburger FC
- Stuttgarter Kickers
- TSV Amicitia Viernheim
- SpVgg Neu-Isenburg
- Borussia Fulda

The following teams were relegated to the Amateurligas:

- Amateurliga Bayern: VfB Helmbrechts, VfL Neustadt, SSV Jahn Regensburg, 1. FC Haßfurt
- Amateurliga Hessen: SV Darmstadt 98, Viktoria Aschaffenburg, FC Hanau 93
- Amateurliga Südbaden: FC Singen 04
- Amateurliga Württemberg: VfR Heilbronn

== Winners and runners-up of the 2. Oberliga Süd ==
| Season | Winner | Runner-Up |
| 1950–51 | Stuttgarter Kickers | Viktoria Aschaffenburg |
| 1951–52 | TSG Ulm 1846 | BC Augsburg |
| 1952–53 | SSV Jahn Regensburg | KSV Hessen Kassel |
| 1953–54 | TSV Schwaben Augsburg | SSV Reutlingen |
| 1954–55 | TSV 1860 Munich | Viktoria Aschaffenburg |
| 1955–56 | Freiburger FC | FC Bayern Munich |
| 1956–57 | TSV 1860 Munich | SSV Reutlingen |
| 1957–58 | SV Waldhof Mannheim | TSG Ulm 1846 |
| 1958–59 | Stuttgarter Kickers | FC Bayern Hof |
| 1959–60 | SV Waldhof Mannheim | Jahn Regensburg |
| 1960–61 | BC Augsburg | Schwaben Augsburg |
| 1961–62 | KSV Hessen Kassel | TSG Ulm 1846 |
| 1962–63 | FSV Frankfurt | ESV Ingolstadt |

== Placings in the 2. Oberliga Süd ==
The league placings from 1950 to 1963:

| Club | 51 | 52 | 53 | 54 | 55 | 56 | 57 | 58 | 59 | 60 | 61 | 62 | 63 |
|---|---|---|---|---|---|---|---|---|---|---|---|---|---|
| FC Bayern Munich | S | S | S | S | S | 2 | S | S | S | S | S | S | S |
| TSV 1860 Munich | S | S | S | 4 | 1 | S | 1 | S | S | S | S | S | S |
| SSV Reutlingen | S | 11 | 8 | 2 | S | S | 2 | S | S | S | S | S | S |
| FC Bayern Hof | 8 | 7 | 4 | 3 | 4 | 14 | 14 | 5 | 2 | S | S | S | S |
| BC Augsburg | S | 2 | S | S | S | S | S | S | S | 6 | 1 | S | S |
| TSV Schwaben Augsburg | S | S | 5 | 1 | S | S | S | 17 | | | 2 | S | S |
| TSG Ulm 1846 | 10 | 1 | S | 9 | 3 | 13 | 3 | 2 | S | S | S | 2 | S |
| KSV Hessen Kassel | 4 | 3 | 2 | S | S | 12 | 9 | 15 | 5 | 7 | 4 | 1 | S |
| FSV Frankfurt | S | S | S | S | S | S | S | S | S | S | S | S | 1 |
| ESV Ingolstadt | | | | | | | | | | | | | 2 |
| SV Waldhof Mannheim | S | S | S | S | 8 | 6 | 7 | 1 | S | 1 | S | S | 3 |
| 1. FC Pforzheim | 6 | 4 | 15 | 11 | 5 | 11 | 4 | 11 | 13 | 9 | 12 | 3 | 4 |
| Freiburger FC | 14 | 14 | 6 | 8 | 11 | 1 | S | 4 | 3 | 11 | 6 | 6 | 5 |
| Stuttgarter Kickers | 1 | S | S | S | S | S | S | S | 1 | S | 8 | 14 | 6 |
| TSV Amicitia Viernheim | | | | | | | | 6 | 9 | 13 | 15 | 13 | 7 |
| SpVgg Neu-Isenburg | | | | | | | 6 | 8 | 8 | 16 | 6 | 7 | 8 |
| Borussia Fulda | | | | | | | | 16 | 17 | | 9 | 5 | 9 |
| SV Darmstadt 98 | S | 10 | 12 | 6 | 12 | 7 | 12 | 7 | 14 | 10 | 18 | | 10 |
| VfB Helmbrechts | | | | | | 16 | 15 | 14 | 15 | 4 | 10 | 12 | 11 |
| VfL Neustadt | | | | | 9 | 9 | 13 | 3 | 4 | 12 | 11 | 11 | 12 |
| SSV Jahn Regensburg | 3 | 8 | 1 | S | S | S | S | S | 7 | 2 | S | 15 | 13 |
| 1. FC Haßfurt | | | | | | | | | | | | 10 | 14 |
| Viktoria Aschaffenburg | 2 | S | S | S | 2 | S | S | S | S | S | 3 | 8 | 15 |
| FC Singen 04 | S | 15 | 14 | 7 | 7 | 3 | 8 | 18 | | 14 | 13 | 9 | 16 |
| FC Hanau 93 | | | | 16 | 10 | 4 | 11 | 10 | 6 | 17 | | 4 | 17 |
| VfR Heilbronn | | | | | | | 18 | | | | | | 18 |
| SV Wiesbaden | 9 | 9 | 9 | 14 | 14 | 8 | 16 | 13 | 12 | 3 | 5 | 16 | |
| SpVgg Bayreuth | | | | | | | | | | 5 | 14 | 17 | |
| ASV Cham | 5 | 13 | 13 | 15 | 15 | 5 | 5 | 9 | 16 | 15 | 16 | 18 | |
| TSV Straubing | 7 | 6 | 11 | 13 | 6 | 10 | 10 | 12 | 10 | 8 | 17 | | |
| 1. FC Bamberg | 12 | 12 | 3 | 12 | 16 | 18 | | | 11 | 18 | | | |
| VfB Friedberg | | | | | | | | | 18 | | | | |
| Karlsruher FV | | | 10 | 5 | 13 | 15 | 17 | | | | | | |
| FC Penzberg | | | | | | 17 | | | | | | | |
| SpVgg Weiden | | | | | 17 | | | | | | | | |
| ASV Durlach | 11 | 5 | 7 | 10 | 18 | | | | | | | | |
| Union Böckingen | 16 | | 16 | 17 | | | | | | | | | |
| FC Wacker München | 13 | 17 | | 18 | | | | | | | | | |
| ASV Feudenheim | | 16 | 17 | | | | | | | | | | |
| VfL Neckarau | S | S | 18 | | | | | | | | | | |
| VfR Aalen | | 18 | | | | | | | | | | | |
| SG Arheilgen | 15 | | | | | | | | | | | | |
| VfL Konstanz | 17 | | | | | | | | | | | | |
| SV Tübingen | 18 | | | | | | | | | | | | |

Source:"2nd Oberliga Süd". Das deutsche Fussball-Archiv. Archived from the original on 5 January 2008.

=== Key ===
| Symbol | Key |
|---|---|
| S | Oberliga Süd |
| 1 | League champions |
| Place | League |
| Blank | Played at a league level below this league |

== Top scorers ==
| Year | Player | Club | Goals |
|---|---|---|---|
| 1950–51 | Klimmeck | SV Wiesbaden | 32 |
| 1951–52 | Platzer | BC Augsburg | 24 |
| 1952–53 | Hubeny | Jahn Regensburg | 24 |
| 1953–54 | Struzina | Schwaben Augsburg | 26 |
| 1953–54 | Huttner | FC Bayern Hof | 26 |
| 1954–55 | Kircher | TSG Ulm 1846 | 25 |
| 1955–56 | Lebefromm | Waldhof Mannheim | 27 |
| 1956–57 | Hohmann | Waldhof Mannheim | 26 |
| 1957–58 | Ruoff | TSG Ulm 1846 | 28 |
| 1958–59 | Horn | FC Bayern Hof | 27 |
| 1959–60 | Schmid | SV Wiesbaden | 31 |
| 1960–61 | Helmut Haller | BC Augsburg | 31 |
| 1961–62 | Kreh | FC Hassfurt | 30 |
| 1962–63 | Weselowski | Amicitia Viernheim | 24 |

Source:100 Jahre Süddeutscher Fussball-Verband. Vindelica Verlag. 1997. p. 170.
