= Amateurliga Nordbaden =

- Founded: 1945
- Folded: 1978
- Replaced by: Oberliga Baden-Württemberg (III); Verbandsliga Nordbaden (IV)
- Countries: Germany 1945–49; West Germany 1949–78
- States: Württemberg-Baden 1945–52; Baden-Württemberg 1952–78
- Region: Baden
- Level on pyramid: Level 3
- Promotion to: Oberliga Süd 1945–50; 2. Oberliga Süd 1950–63; Regionalliga Süd 1963–74; 2nd Bundesliga Süd 1974–78
- Domestic cup: North Baden Cup
- Last champions: FV 09 Weinheim (1977–78)

The Amateurliga Nordbaden was the highest football league in the region of the North Baden Football Association and the third tier of the German football league system from its inception in 1945 to the formation of the Oberliga Baden-Württemberg and the Verbandsliga Nordbaden below it in 1978.

== Overview ==
The Amateurliga Nordbaden was formed in 1945 in the northern half of the then-state of Württemberg-Baden, which is now the northwestern part of the German state of Baden-Württemberg. It was a feeder league to the Oberliga Süd and therefore the second tier of the football league system in the south of West Germany until the inception of the 2. Oberliga Süd in 1950. From 1950 until the establishment of the Oberliga Baden-Württemberg in 1978, it was the third tier of the football league system.

The winner of the Amateurliga Nordbaden was not automatically promoted but rather had to take part in a promotion play-off to its league above. Usually, the champion would have to compete with the winners of the Amateurligas Südbaden, Württemberg and (from 1961) Schwarzwald-Bodensee.

The separation of North Baden and South Baden resulted from the outcome of World War II when the state was split into two separate occupation zones. The north was in the US zone and the south in the French zone. The official names for the two FAs reflect the separation of Südbaden from the originally association, with Nordbaden just simply calling itself Baden FA.

The league was established in 1945 with ten teams, the winner gaining promotion to the Oberliga Süd. The founder members were:

- VfL Neckarau
- VfB Knielingen
- VfB Mühlburg
- VfR Pforzheim
- ASV Feudenheim
- SpVgg Sandhofen
- Amicitia Viernheim
- FV Daxlanden
- Phönix Mannheim
- 1. FC Pforzheim

The league was split into a northern and a southern group from 1946 to 1948.

With the introduction of the Bundesliga in 1963 the Amateurliga was placed below the new Regionalliga Süd but still retained its third-tier status. It continued to do so after the introduction of the 2. Bundesliga Süd in 1974.

The longest continuous member of the league was the SV Sandhausen which gained promotion to it in 1957 and spent 21 seasons in it until its admittance to the new Oberliga in 1978. The VfR Pforzheim spent a record of 28 out of 33 possible seasons in the league.

== Disbanding of the Amateurliga Nordbaden ==
In 1978, the Oberliga Baden-Württemberg was formed to allow direct promotion to the 2. Bundesliga Süd for the Amateure champion of the state. The teams placed one to five gained entry to the Oberliga while the other eleven teams were put into the new Verbandsliga Nordbaden, now the fourth tier of the football league system.

Admitted to the new Oberliga:

- FV 09 Weinheim
- SV Sandhausen
- 1. FC Pforzheim
- VfR Mannheim
- SV Neckargerach

Relegated to the new Verbandsliga:

- SV Schwetzingen
- VfB Eppingen
- VfR Pforzheim
- Karlsruher SC II
- VfL Neckarau
- VfB Bretten
- FVgg Weingarten
- SpVgg Neckarelz
- Germania Mönchzell
- VfB Knielingen
- Alemannia Eggenstein

== Winners of the Amateurliga Nordbaden ==
| Season | Club |
|---|---|
| 1945–46 | **VfL Neckarau** |
| 1946–47 | **VfB Mühlburg**; ASV Feudenheim |
| 1947–48 | TSG Rohrbach; VfR Pforzheim |
| 1948–49 | 1. FC Pforzheim |
| 1949–50 | **VfL Neckarau** |
| 1950–51 | **ASV Feudenheim** |
| 1951–52 | **Karlsruher FV** |
| 1952–53 | FV Daxlanden |
| 1953–54 | Amicitia Viernheim |
| 1954–55 | Amicitia Viernheim |
| 1955–56 | Amicitia Viernheim |
| 1956–57 | **Amicitia Viernheim** |
| 1957–58 | VfL Neckarau |
| 1958–59 | VfR Pforzheim |
| 1959–60 | Phönix Mannheim |
| 1960–61 | SV Sandhausen |

| Season | Club |
|---|---|
| 1961–62 | VfL Neckarau |
| 1962–63 | FV 09 Weinheim |
| 1963–64 | SV Schwetzingen |
| 1964–65 | Karlsruher SC II |
| 1965–66 | Germania Forst |
| 1966–67 | ASV Feudenheim |
| 1967–68 | **VfL Neckarau** |
| 1968–69 | Germania Forst |
| 1969–70 | FV 09 Weinheim |
| 1970–71 | Waldhof Mannheim |
| 1971–72 | **Waldhof Mannheim** |
| 1972–73 | **VfR Mannheim** |
| 1973–74 | Karlsruher FV |
| 1974–75 | VfB Eppingen |
| 1975–76 | VfR Mannheim |
| 1976–77 | SV Neckargerach |
| 1977–78 | FV 09 Weinheim |

Source: "Verbandsliga Nordbaden". Das deutsche Fussball-Archiv. Archived from the original on 7 March 2008.

- **Bold** denotes team gained promotion.
- In 1950, three teams were promoted to the new 2. Oberliga Süd.
- In 1965 the VfR Pforzheim gained promotion as runners-up as the reserves team of Karlsruher SC was ineligible.
