= List of clubs in the Oberliga Baden-Württemberg =

This is a List of clubs in the Oberliga Baden-Württemberg, including all clubs and their final placings from the inaugural season 1978–79 to the current one. The league, is the highest football league in the state of Baden-Württemberg. It is one of fourteen Oberligas in German football, the fifth tier of the German football league system. Until the introduction of the 3. Liga in 2008 it was the fourth tier of the league system, until the introduction of the Regionalligas in 1994 the third tier.

== Overview ==
The league was formed in 1978 to replace the four regional amateur leagues that existed in its place until then as the third tier in Baden-Württemberg. Originally it carried the name Amateur-Oberliga Baden-Württemberg. In 1994, when the Regionalliga Süd was formed, the league changed its official name once more, now to Oberliga Baden-Württemberg, and became a tier four league. In 2012, the Regionalliga Süd was replaced by the Regionalliga Südwest but little else changed for the Oberliga otherwise.

=== League timeline ===
The league went through the following timeline of name changes, format and position in the league system:

Years	Name	Tier	Promotion to
1978–81	Amateur-Oberliga Baden-Württemberg	III	2. Bundesliga Süd
1981–94	Amateur-Oberliga Baden-Württemberg	III	2. Bundesliga
1994–2008	Oberliga Baden-Württemberg	IV	Regionalliga Süd
2008–12	Oberliga Baden-Württemberg	V	Regionalliga Süd
2012–	Oberliga Baden-Württemberg	V	Regionalliga Südwest

== List of clubs ==
This is a complete list of clubs, as of the 2022–23 season, sorted by the last season a club played in the league:

Club	No	First	Last	Best	Titles	Seasons
SSV Reutlingen^{5}	28	1978–79	Present	1st	3	1988–89, 1991–92, 2005–06
FC 08 Villingen	23	1978–79	Present	2nd	—	—
Offenburger FV	18	1978–79	Present	2nd	—	—
1. Göppinger SV	17	1978–79	Present	2nd	—	—
FV Ravensburg	16	1978–79	Present	4th	—	—
Freiburger FC	18	1982–83	Present	1st	1	1983–84
FC Nöttingen	17	2002–03	Present	1st	1	2003–04
SG Sonnenhof Großaspach	4	2005–06	Present	1st	1	2008–09
FSV Hollenbach	7	2010–11	Present	6th	—	—
FSV 08 Bissingen	8	2012–13	Present	2nd	—	—
SV Oberachern	8	2013–14	Present	6th	—	—
1. CfR Pforzheim	7	2015–16	Present	5th	—	—
Neckarsulmer SU	6	2016–17	Present	3rd	—	—
TSG Backnang 1919	4	2017–18	Present	3rd	—	—
Stuttgarter Kickers	4	2018–19	Present	2nd	—	—
1. FC Rielasingen-Arlen	3	2019–20	Present	6th	—	—
ATSV Mutschelbach	0+	2022–23	Present	—	—	—
FC Holzhausen	0+	2022–23	Present	—	—	—
SV Linx	13	1987–88	2021–22	6th	—	—
Sportfreunde Dorfmerkingen	7	1998–99	2021–22	7th	—	—
SGV Freiberg	19	2001–02	2021–22	1st	1	2021–22
1. FC Bruchsal	3	2013–14	2021–22	14th	—	—
FC Astoria Walldorf II	4	2016–17	2021–22	15th	—	—
TSV Ilshofen	4	2018–19	2021–22	13th	—	—
FV Lörrach-Brombach	2	2020–21	2021–22	18th	—	—
SV Sandhausen II^{15}	5	2015–16	2020–21	10th	—	—
VfB Stuttgart II	19	1979–80	2019–20	1st	4	1979–80, 1997–98, 2002–03, 2019–20
Bahlinger SC	21	1996–97	2018–19	1st	1	2018–19
1. FC Normannia Gmünd	9	2004–05	2018–19	5th	—	—
SV Spielberg	8	2009–10	2018–19	1st	1	2014–15
FC Germania Friedrichstal	3	2014–15	2018–19	12th	—	—
Karlsruher SC II^{14}	19	1983–84	2017–18	1st	3	1989–90, 1995–96, 2004–05
TSG Weinheim^{2}	6	1999–2000	2017–18	5th	—	—
TSG Balingen	10	2008–09	2017–18	1st	1	2017–18
Stuttgarter Kickers II^{13}	18	1991–92	2016–17	6th	—	—
SC Freiburg II	11	1998–99	2016–17	1st	2	2007–08, 2016–17
SpVgg Neckarelz	4	2010–11	2016–17	1st	1	2012–13
SSV Ulm 1846^{3}	19	1978–79	2015–16	1st	8	1978–79, 1981–82, 1982–83, 1985–86, 1992–93, 1993–94, 2011–12, 2015–16
SC Pfullendorf	17	1980–81	2015–16	1st	1	2001–02
Kehler FV	8	2008–09	2015–16	8th	—	—
VfR Mannheim^{4}	25	1978–79	2014–15	2nd	—	—
VfR Aalen II^{12}	1	2014–15	2014–15	13th	—	—
SV Kickers Pforzheim	1	2014–15	2014–15	18th	—	—
FC Astoria Walldorf	7	2007–08	2013–14	1st	1	2013–14
TSV Grunbach^{11}	2	2012–13	2013–14	2nd	—	—
1. FC Heidenheim II^{11}	1	2013–14	2013–14	12th	—	—
FC Singen 04	4	1997–98	2012–13	9th	—	—
SV Bonlanden	12	1995–96	2011–12	7th	—	—
FV Illertissen^{10}	4	2008–09	2011–12	4th	—	—
VfL Kirchheim/Teck^{7}	17	1986–87	2010–11	1st	1	1996–97
ASV Durlach	8	1993–94	2010–11	12th	—	—
Waldhof Mannheim^{5}	6	2003–04	2010–11	1st	1	2010–11
VfB Neckarrems	1	2010–11	2010–11	17th	—	—
FC Denzlingen	4	1999–2000	2009–10	12th	—	—
TSV Crailsheim	7	2003–04	2009–10	2nd	—	—
TSG Hoffenheim II	7	2003–04	2009–10	1st	1	2009–10
SpVgg Au/Iller	6	1999–2000	2008–09	4th	—	—
1. FC Heidenheim^{9}	5	1978–79	2007–08	2nd	—	—
TSV Schwieberdingen	1	2007–08	2007–08	17th	—	—
SV Sandhausen	28	1978–79	2006–07	1st	6	1980–81, 1984–85, 1986–87, 1994–95, 1999–2000, 2006–07
1. FC Pforzheim^{6}	21	1978–79	2006–07	1st	1	1990–91
FC Emmendingen	3	1989–90	2006–07	15th	—	—
FV Lauda	14	1981–82	2005–06	2nd	—	—
SpVgg Ludwigsburg	23	1978–79	2004–05	2nd	—	—
FC Teningen	2	2000–01	2002–03	16th	—	—
Waldhof Mannheim II^{5}	2	2001–02	2002–03	6th	—	—
VfR Heilbronn^{8}	10	1979–80	2001–02	3rd	—	—
TSF Ditzingen	5	1991–92	2001–02	4th	—	—
SGK Heidelberg	9	1984–85	2000–01	3rd	—	—
TSG Hoffenheim	1	2000–01	2000–01	1st	1	2000–01
FV Biberach	14	1978–79	1999–2000	4th	—	—
VfR Aalen	13	1980–81	1998–99	1st	1	1998–99
SV Böblingen	3	1996–97	1998–99	10th	—	—
FC Steinen	2	1997–98	1998–99	13th	—	—
TSV Wäldenbronn	4	1994–95	1997–98	6th	—	—
Viktoria Bammental	3	1995–96	1997–98	10th	—	—
SG Oftersheim	1	1996–97	1996–97	16th	—	—
VfB Gaggenau	11	1979–80	1995–96	6th	—	—
SC Geislingen	10	1984–85	1995–96	3rd	—	—
Amicitia Viernheim	4	1987–88	1995–96	15th	—	—
FC Wangen	1	1995–96	1995–96	13th	—	—
VfR Pforzheim^{1,6}	3	1992–93	1994–95	2nd	—	—
GSV Maichingen^{1}	2	1993–94	1994–95	5th	—	—
FV Donaueschingen	1	1994–95	1994–95	17th	—	—
SV Schwetzingen	8	1982–83	1992–93	3rd	—	—
VfL Sindelfingen	3	1990–91	1992–93	12th	—	—
SG Lörrach-Stetten	1	1992–93	1992–93	18th	—	—
FV 09 Weinheim^{2}	13	1978–79	1991–92	1st	1	1987–88
FC Marbach	8	1984–85	1991–92	3rd	—	—
VfB Leimen	1	1991–92	1991–92	17th	—	—
VfB Eppingen	3	1979–80	1990–91	2nd	—	—
FC Tailfingen	5	1978–79	1988–89	6th	—	—
VfL Neckarau	1	1988–89	1988–89	18th	—	—
Sportfreunde/DJK Freiburg	1	1987–88	1987–88	17th	—	—
FC Rastatt 04	8	1978–79	1985–86	9th	—	—
SV Kuppenheim	6	1978–79	1984–85	8th	—	—
SV Weil	1	1984–85	1984–85	18th	—	—
SV Neckargerach	4	1978–79	1983–84	8th	—	—
TSV Ofterdingen	1	1982–83	1982–83	17th	—	—
Sportfreunde Schwäbisch Hall	1	1981–82	1981–82	18th	—	—
FC Eislingen	3	1978–79	1980–81	3rd	—	—
DJK Konstanz	3	1978–79	1980–81	7th	—	—
VfB Friedrichshafen	1	1978–79	1978–79	19th	—	—

=== Key ===
Denotes club plays in a league above the Oberliga Baden-Württemberg in 2022–23.	Denotes club plays in the Oberliga Baden-Württemberg in 2022–23.	Denotes club plays in a league below the Oberliga Baden-Württemberg in 2022–23.

Club	Name of club
No	Number of seasons in league
First	First season in league
Last	Last season in league
Best	Best result in league
Titles	Number of league titles won
Seasons	Seasons league titles were won in

=== Notes ===
- ^{1} In 1995 VfR Pforzheim and GSV Maichingen withdrew their teams from the league.
- ^{2} In 1998 FV 09 Weinheim joined TSG Weinheim to form TSG 62/09 Weinheim.
- ^{3} In 2001 SSV Ulm 1846 withdrew from the 2nd Bundesliga to the Verbandsliga for financial reasons. In 2014 Ulm declared insolvency and was relegated from the Regionalliga.
- ^{4} In 2002 VfR Mannheim withdrew from the Regionalliga to the Landesliga.
- ^{5} In 2003 SSV Reutlingen and SV Waldhof Mannheim were relegated to the Oberliga for financial reasons. SV Waldhof Mannheim II was relegated because the first team was dropped to the Oberliga.
- ^{6} In 2010 1. FC Pforzheim and VfR Pforzheim merged to form 1. CfR Pforzheim.
- ^{7} In 2011 VfL Kirchheim/Teck voluntarily withdrew from the league.
- ^{8} In 2003 VfR Heilbronn merged with SpVgg Heilbronn to form FC Heilbronn.
- ^{9} In 2007 the football department of SB Heidenheim left the club to form 1. FC Heidenheim 1846.
- ^{10} In 2012 FV Illertissen left the Baden-Württemberg football league system to join the Bavarian one.
- ^{11} In 2014 TSV Grunbach and 1. FC Heidenheim II withdrew from the league.
- ^{12} In 2015 VfR Aalen II withdrew from the league.
- ^{13} In 2017 Stuttgarter Kickers II withdrew from the league.
- ^{14} In 2018 Karlsruher FC II withdrew from the league.
- ^{15} In 2021 SV Sandhausen II withdrew from the league.

== League placings ==
The complete list of clubs in the league and their league placings.

=== Amateur-Oberliga Baden-Württemberg ===
The complete list of clubs and placings in the league while operating as the tier three Amateur-Oberliga Baden-Württemberg from 1978 to 1994:

Club	79	80	81	82	83	84	85	86	87	88	89	90	91	92	93	94
SSV Ulm 1846	1	2B	2B	1	1	2B	2B	1	2B	2B	7	13	7	2	1	1
SSV Reutlingen	20		11	14	19			13	8	7	1	2	3	1	3	2
VfR Mannheim	6	7	9	4	5	5	2	12	3	5	13	11	9	10	4	3
TSF Ditzingen														9	6	4
VfR Pforzheim															14	5
SpVgg Ludwigsburg	10	13	4	2	7	7	14	5	9	14		8	2	8	7	6
GSV Maichingen																7
SV Linx										18						8
SV Sandhausen	11	8	1	7	3	3	1	4	1	3	4	6	5	11	2	9
1. FC Pforzheim	17							3	7	9	2	3	1	13	8	10
VfR Aalen			16			6	6	6	16		10	17				11
VfB Stuttgart II		1	2	3	4	4	11	8	10	16			6	5	9	12
SC Geislingen							5	17		10	14	12	16		12	13
VfL Kirchheim/Teck									5	4	11	14	15		13	14
ASV Durlach																15
VfB Gaggenau		18							14	6	12	9	14	6	11	16
SC Pfullendorf			17		10	9	10	14	15		15		11	14	5	17
Freiburger FC	2B	2B	2B	2B	6	1	8	2	4	2	9	18		4	10	18
SV Schwetzingen					16				13	13	3	4	4	7	15	
Karlsruher SC II						13	16					1	8	3	16	
VfL Sindelfingen													12	12	17	
SG Lörrach-Stetten															18	
FC Marbach							3	9	12	12	5	7	13	15		
FV 09 Weinheim	4	4	3	16		12	13	11	6	1	8	10	10	16		
VfB Leimen														17		
Stuttgarter Kickers II														18		
Offenburger FV	5	5	6	6	2	2	4	10	2	11	6	5	17			
VfB Eppingen		2	2B	17									18			
Amicitia Viernheim										15		15				
FC Emmendingen												16				
SGK Heidelberg							9	7	11	8	16					
FC Tailfingen	8	6	10	15							17					
VfL Neckarau											18					
Sportfreunde/DJK Freiburg										17						
VfR Heilbronn		14	13	11	15	15			17							
FV Lauda				10	14	16		15	18							
FV Biberach	13	15	5	5	13	8	7	16								
FC 08 Villingen	9	17				17		18								
FC Rastatt 04	12	9	12	9	12	10	12	19								
SV Kuppenheim	15	16		8	9	11	15									
1. Göppinger SV	2	3	7	12	11	14	17									
SV Weil							18									
SV Neckargerach	16		15		8	18										
TSV Ofterdingen					17											
FV Ravensburg	14	12	8	13	18											
Sportfreunde Schwäbisch Hall				18												
FC Eislingen	3	10	14													
DJK Konstanz	7	11	18													
SB Heidenheim	18															
VfB Friedrichshafen	19															

=== Oberliga Baden-Württemberg ===
==== 1994–2012 ====
The complete list of clubs and placings in the league while operating as the tier four (1994–2008) and five (2008–2012) Oberliga Baden-Württemberg and feeding the Regionalliga Süd:

Club	95	96	97	98	99	00	01	02	03	04	05	06	07	08	09	10	11	12
TSG Hoffenheim							1	R	R	R	R	R	R	2B	B	B	B	B
VfR Aalen	10	4	7	6	1	R	R	R	R	R	R	R	R	R	3L	R	3L	3L
SV Sandhausen	1	R	4	7	2	1	4	2	4	7	7	5	1	R	3L	3L	3L	3L
1. FC Heidenheim											5	2	3	4	R	3L	3L	3L
VfB Stuttgart II	7	2	3	1	R	R	R	R	1	R	R	R	R	R	3L	3L	3L	3L
SC Pfullendorf		5	6	2	R	R	R	1	R	R	R	R	R	R	R	R	R	R
Karlsruher SC II	4	1	R	R	R	R	8	11	15	4	1	R	R	R	R	R	R	R
SC Freiburg II					5	6	6	7	3	5	4	4	7	1	R	R	R	R
Sonnenhof Großaspach												14	13	10	1	R	R	R
TSG Hoffenheim II										10	8	6	8	5	2	1	R	R
Waldhof Mannheim	2B	2B	2B	R	R	2B	2B	2B	2B	3	11	8	10	3	R	R	1	R
SSV Ulm 1846	R	R	R	R	2B	B	2B		2	6	2	3	2	2	R	R	R	1
VfR Mannheim	R	R	R	R	R	R	R	R			12	10	15	16	16			2
SpVgg Neckarelz																	4	3
FV Illertissen															8	4	7	4
TSG Balingen															3	10	10	5
FC Nöttingen									8	1	R	9	14	11	5	9	2	6
FC Astoria Walldorf														8	4	2	8	7
SSV Reutlingen	R	R	R	R	R	R	2B	2B	2B	9	3	1	R	R	R	R	14	8
FSV Hollenbach																	12	9
Kehler FV															15	11	11	10
Bahlinger SC			5	8	6	9	12	9	14	15	17		12	13	6	3	13	11
FC 08 Villingen	16							14	17		16		4	6	12	13	3	12
Offenburger FV															18			13
SV Spielberg																15		14
Stuttgarter Kickers II							11	8	7	12	10	13	9	15	7	12	6	15
Normannia Gmünd											9	12	11	9	10	7	5	16
SV Bonlanden		7	8	11	11	11	16		9	8	15		18			18		17
VfL Kirchheim/Teck	12	9	1	R	7	8	17							14	9	6	9	
SGV Freiberg								13	11	14	14	7	5	12	11	8	15	
TSG Weinheim						15		16		18						5	16	
VfB Neckarrems																	17	
ASV Durlach	13	12	15									16			14	14	18	
SV Linx	9	6	14							16		18		18			19	
FC Denzlingen						12	13	18								16		
TSV Crailsheim										2	6	11	6	7	13	17		
SpVgg Au/Iller						5	9	4	13	17					17			
TSV Schwieberdingen														17				
1. FC Pforzheim	8	3	2	5	3	7	2	3	12	19			16					
FC Emmendingen												15	17					
FV Lauda				12	4	2	5	10	6	13	13	17						
SpVgg Ludwigsburg	R	R	R	3	9	4	10	5	5	11	18							
Waldhof Mannheim II								6	10									
FC Teningen							18		16									
Spfr. Dorfmerkingen					14		7	12	18									
VfR Heilbronn				15		10	3	15										
TSF Ditzingen	R	R	R	R	R	R	14	17										
SGK Heidelberg			13		8	3	15											
FV Biberach	11	11	10	4	13	13												
FV Ravensburg					12	14												
FC Singen 04				9	10	16												
SV Böblingen			12	10	15													
FC Steinen				13	16													
TSV Wäldenbronn	6	8	9	14														
Viktoria Bammental		10	11	16														
SG Oftersheim			16															
FC Wangen		13																
VfB Gaggenau	14	14																
SC Geislingen	3	15																
Amicitia Viernheim	15	16																
VfR Pforzheim	2																	
GSV Maichingen	5																	
FV Donaueschingen	17																	

==== 2012–present ====
The complete list of clubs and placings in the league while operating as the tier five Oberliga Baden-Württemberg and feeding the Regionalliga Südwest (2012–present):

Club	13	14	15	16	17	18	19	20	21	22	23
SG Sonnenhof Großaspach	R	R	3L	3L	3L	3L	3L	3L	R	R	x
FC Astoria Walldorf	2	1	R	R	R	R	R	R	R	R	R
SSV Ulm 1846	R	R	5	1	R	R	R	R	R	R	R
SC Freiburg II	R	R	R	R	1	R	R	R	R	3L	3L
TSG Balingen	10	13	4	8	4	1	R	R	R	R	R
VfB Stuttgart II	3L	3L	3L	3L	R	R	R	1	R	R	R
Bahlinger SC	6	14	2	R	5	9	1	R	R	R	R
SGV Freiberg	5	4	3	15		3	7	16	1	1	R
Stuttgarter Kickers	3L	3L	3L	3L	R	R	2	3	2	2	x
TSG Backnang 1919						12	15		12	3	x
FC 08 Villingen	11	6	16	16		2	8	5	10	4	x
1. CfR Pforzheim				5	8	13	11	13	11	5	x
1. Göppinger SV					7	8	5	2	3	6	x
FC Nöttingen	4	3	R	2	R	5	4	12	5	7	x
FV Ravensburg		9	7	9	6	6	6	4	8	8	x
SSV Reutlingen	7	7	9	11	9	7	9	14	13	9	x
FSV 08 Bissingen	17			3	2	4	3	7	4	10	x
1. FC Rielasingen-Arlen								11	6	11	x
Neckarsulmer SU					3	10	10	15	7	12	x
SV Oberachern		18		7	13	11	14	6	17	13	x
Freiburger FC			15	13				8	20	14	x
Spfr. Dorfmerkingen								9	9	15	
FC Astoria Walldorf II					15	17			19	16	
SV Linx							12	10	16	17	
1. FC Bruchsal		17							14	18	
TSV Ilshofen							13	17	15	19	
FV Lörrach-Brombach									18	20	
SV Sandhausen II				10	11	16		18	21		
FC Germania Friedrichstal			12	17			16				
1. FC Normannia Gmünd							17				
SV Spielberg	15	16	1	R	10	14	18				
Karlsruher SC II	12	5	6	4	12	15					
TSG Weinheim						18					
Stuttgarter Kickers II	14	10	14	12	14						
FSV Hollenbach	9	8	8	6	16						x
Offenburger FV	16				17						x
SpVgg Neckarelz	1	R	R	R	18						
Kehler FV	8	11	10	14							
SC Pfullendorf	R	R	11	18							
VfR Aalen II			13								
VfR Mannheim	3	15	17								
SV Kickers Pforzheim			18								
TSV Grunbach	13	2									
1. FC Heidenheim II		12									
FC Singen 04	18										
FC Holzhausen											x
ATSV Mutschelbach											x

=== Key ===
Symbol	Key
B	Bundesliga
2B	2. Bundesliga
3L	3. Liga
R	Regionalliga Süd (1994–2012) Regionalliga Südwest (2012–present)
1	League champions
Place	League
Blank	Played at a league level below this league
