= 2013–14 Oberliga =

Tournament details
- Country: Germany

Final positions
- Champions: 14 regional winners

Tournament statistics
- Top goal scorer: Iman Bi-Ria (48 goals)

The 2013–14 season of the Oberliga was the sixth season of the Oberligas at tier five of the German football league system and the 40th season overall since reintroduction of the Oberligas in 1974. The regular season started in July 2013 and finished in May 2014.

The Oberliga is organised in fourteen regional divisions with the league champions promoted to the level above, the Regionalligas while the relegated teams drop down to the Verbandsligas and Landesligas.

== Overview ==
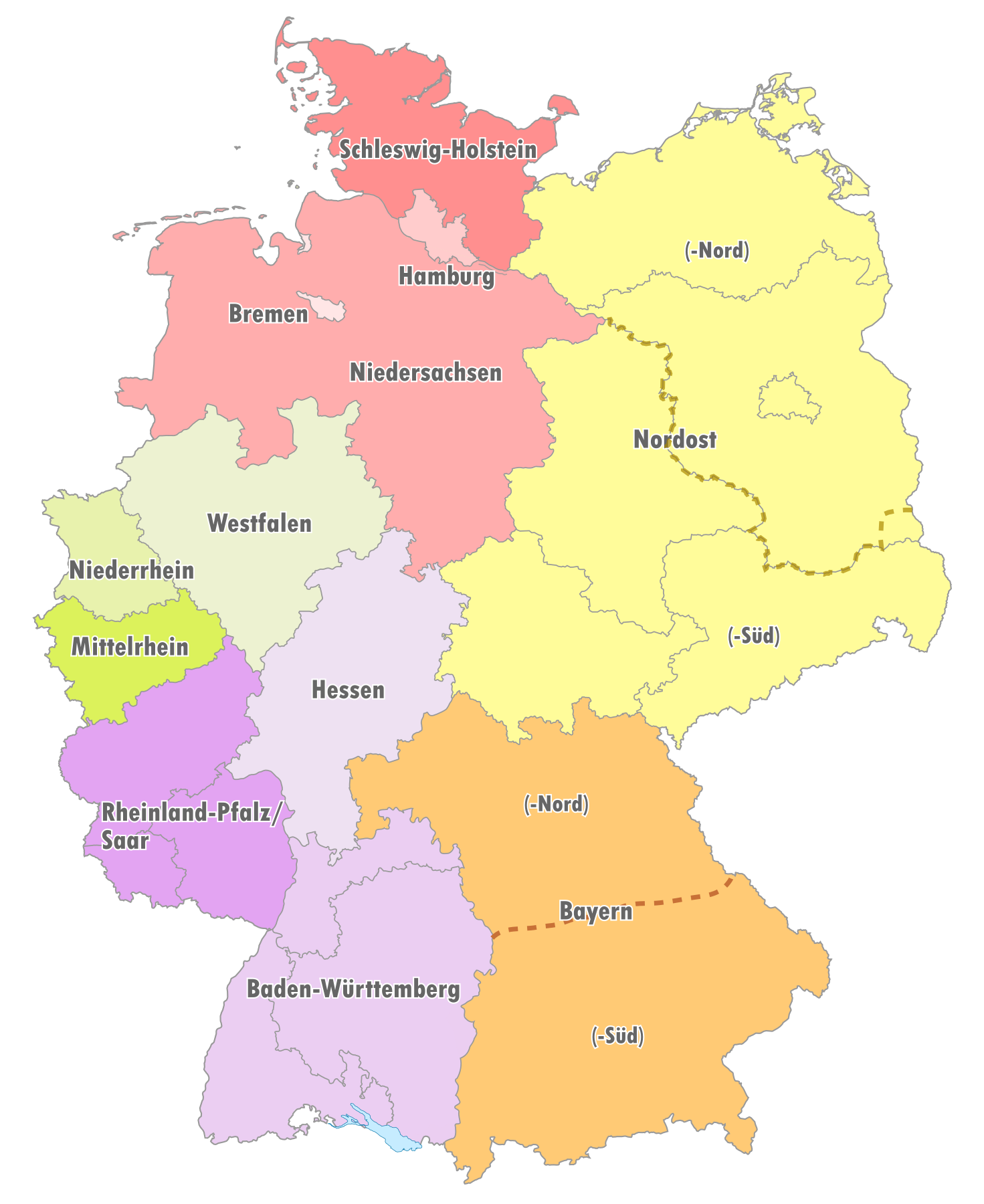
The fourteen Oberligas in Germany in 2013–14

The 2013–14 season saw 245 clubs compete in fourteen Oberliga divisions. Of the fourteen league champions eight were promoted to the Regionalliga while four declined promotion. One club, Bremer SV, missed out on promotion in the play-off round while Arminia Bielefeld II was ineligible for promotion because the first team of the club was relegated to the 3. Liga and reserve teams of 3. Liga clubs can not play in the Regionalliga. Two of the league champions who declined promotion, BC Aichach and TGM SV Jügesheim, completely withdrew from the Oberliga to compete at a lower level in 2014–15.

Of the fourteen league champions VfB Lübeck was arguably the most outstanding, winning 31 of their 34-season games and drawing the other three, thereby remaining undefeated all season. BFC Dynamo was the only other undefeated team, winning 27 and also drawing three. Lübeck also had the best defence, conceding only 17 goals all season and the second-best attack with 116 goals scored, four less than Bremer SV. PSV Wesel-Lackhausen had the worst defence of all Oberliga clubs, conceding 130 goals. While no club went winless all season a number achieved only two wins all season.

Four Oberliga runners-up and one third placed team were also promoted to the Regionalliga. FC Nöttingen and FT Braunschweig did so after success in a promotion round while SV Rödinghausen was automatically promoted as the Oberliga Westfalen runners-up and VfR Garching and FC Kray took up the promotion spot their league champions had declined. No club was promoted from the Bremen-Liga, Oberliga Hamburg and Hessenliga.

At the other end of the table, 38 clubs were relegated from the Oberligas while six voluntarily withdrew to compete at a lower level. Four more teams, all reserve sides, were completely withdrawn from competition. All up, 48 clubs dropped out of the league.

The most goals scored by any player in the Oberligas were by Iranian-German Iman Bi-Ria who scored 48 goals for Bremer SV in the Bremen-Liga.

== 2013–14 season ==
The 2013–14 league champions, promoted and relegated teams, the league strength (S), the top scorer and the number of goals they scored:

Oberliga	Champions	Promoted	Relegated	S	Top scorer	Goals
Oberliga Baden-Württemberg 2013–14 season	FC Astoria Walldorf	FC Astoria Walldorf FC Nöttingen	TSV Grunbach^{†}: 1. FC Heidenheim II^{†}; 1. FC Bruchsal; SV Oberachern	18	Michael Schürg (FCN)	28
Bayernliga Nord 2013–14 season	SpVgg Bayreuth	SpVgg Bayreuth	SpVgg Selbitz ASV Neumarkt ASV Hollfeld	18	Alexander Mantlik (TSVG)	19
Bayernliga Süd 2013–14 season	BC Aichach^{‡}	VfR Garching	BC Aichach^{†} Wacker Burghausen II^{†} FC Affing FC Ismaning	18	Florian Schrepel (TSVB)	21
Bremen-Liga 2013–14 season	Bremer SV^{¶}	—	OT Bremen: 1. FC Burg	16	Iman Bi-Ria (BSV)	48
Oberliga Hamburg 2013–14 season	TuS Dassendorf^{‡}	—	Oststeinbeker SV^{†} SC Alstertal-Langenhorn SV Blankenese Bramfelder SV	18	Eric Agyemang (TuSD)	27
Hessenliga 2013–14 season	TGM SV Jügesheim^{‡}	—	TGM SV Jügesheim^{†} FSV Frankfurt II^{†} FSV 1926 Fernwald^{†} Kickers Offenbach II Hünfelder SV	19	Steffen Moritz (RWH)	32
Mittelrheinliga 2013–14 season	FC Hennef 05	FC Hennef 05	SSV Merten Hilal Bergheim SV Nierfeld Sportfreunde Troisdorf 05	16	Sahin Dagistan (FCWB)	23
Niedersachsenliga 2013–14 season	Lüneburger SK Hansa	Lüneburger SK Hansa FT Braunschweig	VfL Bückeburg TuS Celle FC	16	Saimir Dikollari (TVU) Phillip Stucki (FTB)	19
NOFV-Oberliga Nord 2013–14 season	BFC Dynamo	BFC Dynamo	VSG Altglienicke^{†} RSV Waltersdorf 09 Torgelower SV Greif	16	Henry Haufe (HR II)	23
NOFV-Oberliga Süd 2013–14 season	FSV Budissa Bautzen	FSV Budissa Bautzen	Hallescher FC II FC Grün-Weiß Piesteritz Heidenauer SV	16	Jan Nezmar (FCO)	20
Oberliga Niederrhein 2013–14 season	SV Hönnepel-Niedermörmter^{‡}	FC Kray	Rot-Weiss Essen II^{†} VfL Rhede VfB Speldorf SV Uedesheim PSV Wesel-Lackhausen	20	Andre Trienenjost (SVHN)	29
Oberliga Rheinland-Pfalz/Saar 2013–14 season	FK Pirmasens	FK Pirmasens	SV Mehring Alemannia Waldalgesheim SV Roßbach/Verscheid	18	Björn Recktenwald (HW)	21
Schleswig-Holstein-Liga 2013–14 season	VfB Lübeck	VfB Lübeck	Husumer SV SSC Hagen Ahrensburg SV Eichede II Heikendorfer SV	18	Stefan Richter (VfB)	28
Oberliga Westfalen 2013–14 season	Arminia Bielefeld II^{#}	SV Rödinghausen	TuS Heven TuS Dornberg	18	Stefan Oerterer (SVE)	33

- ^{‡} Denotes club declined promotion.
- ^{†} Denotes club withdrew from league.
- ^{¶} Denotes club failed to win promotion.
- ^{#} Denotes club was ineligible for promotion.

== Promotion play-offs ==
Promotion play-offs were held at the end of the season to the Regionalliga Südwest, Regionalliga Bayern and Regionalliga Nord:

=== Regionalliga Südwest ===
The runners-up of the Hessenliga, Oberliga Rheinland-Pfalz/Saar and the Oberliga Baden-Württemberg were scheduled to play each other for one more spot in the Regionalliga. The Hessenliga runners-up declined this opportunity leaving just two teams to play off, with FC Nöttingen winning promotion to the Regionalliga:

29 May 2014	FC Nöttingen	0−0	FSV Salmrohr	Panoramastadion, Nöttingen
18:00		Report		Attendance: 1,400; Referee: Christof Günsch

1 June 2014	FSV Salmrohr	0−1	FC Nöttingen	Salmtalstadion, Salmrohr
16:00		Report	Schürg 78'	Attendance: 2,800; Referee: Kai Vonderschmidt

=== Regionalliga Bayern ===
==== First round ====
The 15th and 16th placed Regionalliga teams played the runners-up of the northern division, TSV Aubstadt, and the third placed team in the south, FC Pipinsried. Both Bayernliga teams failed to earn promotion while 1. FC Schweinfurt 05 retained its league place and TSV 1860 Rosenheim was relegated:

First leg

27 May 2014	FC Pipinsried	2−2	TSV 1860 Rosenheim	Stadion an der Reichertshausener Straße, Pipinsried
18:30	Schön 4'; Fischer 60'	Report	Majdancevic 65'; Potenza 90+4'	Attendance: 750; Referee: Markus Pflaum

27 May 2014	TSV Aubstadt	2−3	1. FC Schweinfurt 05	Schulstadion, Aubstadt
18:30	Leicht 50'; Köttler 76'	Report	Jäckel 25'; Müller 35'; Häcker 69'	Attendance: 2,820; Referee: Lothar Ostheimer

Second leg

30 May 2014	TSV 1860 Rosenheim	1−0	FC Pipinsried	Sportanlage Jahnstraße, Rosenheim
18:30	Köhler 50'	Report		Attendance: 900; Referee: Michael Emmer

Rosenheim won 3−2 on aggregate.

30 May 2014	1. FC Schweinfurt 05	4−1	TSV Aubstadt	Willy-Sachs-Stadion, Schweinfurt
19:00	Jäckel 21'; Krautschneider 27', 63'; Fery 85'	Report	Grader 51'	Attendance: 4,242; Referee: Florian Badstübner

Schweinfurt won 7−3 on aggregate.

==== Second round ====
The winners of the first round play each other for the one available spot in the Regionalliga:

First leg

3 June 2014	TSV 1860 Rosenheim	0−1	1. FC Schweinfurt 05	Sportanlage Jahnstraße, Rosenheim
19:00		Report	Krautschneider 76'	Attendance: 764; Referee: Christian Leicher

Second leg

6 June 2014	1. FC Schweinfurt 05	5–1	TSV 1860 Rosenheim	Willy-Sachs-Stadion, Schweinfurt
19:00	Müller 23', 46'; Krautschneider 30', 49'; Häcker 90'	Report	Lenz 89'	Attendance: 3,567; Referee: Christian Dietz

Schweinfurt won 6–1 on aggregate.

=== Regionalliga Nord ===
The champions of the Bremen-Liga and the Schleswig-Holstein-Liga as well as the runners-up from the Niedersachsenliga entered a play-off for two more spots in the Regionalliga Nord. The champions of the Oberliga Hamburg declined participation. VfB Lübeck and FT Braunschweig were promoted while Bremer SV failed to win promotion:

31 May 2014	VfB Lübeck	5−1	FT Braunschweig	Stadion an der Lohmühle, Lübeck
14:00	Senger 28' Bohnsack 44' Arslan 53' Wehrendt 62' Sirmais 79'	Report	Eggers 54'	Attendance: 7,500; Referee: Patrick Schult

3 June 2014	FT Braunschweig	4−0	Bremer SV	Prinzenparkstadion, Braunschweig
15:00	Krüger 14' Fricke 29' Uysal 55' Kaupert 76'	Report		Attendance: 1,455; Referee: Viatcheslav Paltchikov

7 June 2014	Bremer SV	3−4	VfB Lübeck	Stadiongelände, Platz 11, Bremen
19:00	Kurkiewicz 36' Gül 50' Uluisik 90'	Report	Marheineke 10' Kmiec 24' (o.g.) Arslan 55' Koth 89'	Attendance: 911; Referee: Robert Schröder
