= 2011–12 Oberliga Baden-Württemberg =

Oberliga Baden-Württemberg
- Season: 2011–12
- Champions: SSV Ulm 1846
- Promoted: SSV Ulm 1846
- Relegated: 1. FC Normannia Gmünd; SV Bonlanden; VfL Kirchheim/Teck
- Matches: 272
- Top goalscorer: Alexander Zimmermann (21 goals)

The 2011–12 season of the Oberliga Baden-Württemberg, the highest association football league in Baden-Württemberg, was the fourth season of the league at tier five (V) of the German football league system and the 35th season overall since establishment of the league in 1978.

The champions, SSV Ulm 1846, were promoted to the new Regionalliga Südwest, the bottom three teams, 1. FC Normannia Gmünd, SV Bonlanden and VfL Kirchheim/Teck, relegated to the Verbandsligas. Kirchheim withdrew its team shortly before the start of the season and did not play any league matches. The FV Illertissen opted to leave the Württemberg FA at the end of the season and join the Bavarian FA instead, competing in the Regionalliga Bayern in 2012–13.

For league champions SSV Ulm 1846 it was the seventh title in the Oberliga Baden-Württemberg and it came only a year after the club had become insolvent in the Regionalliga Süd and had been relegated.

The league's top scorer was Alexander Zimmermann of SV Spielberg with 21 goals.

== Season ==
The league featured five new clubs for the 2011–12 season:

- SSV Ulm 1846, relegated from the Regionalliga Süd
- VfR Mannheim and SV Spielberg, promoted from the Verbandsliga Baden
- Offenburger FV, promoted from the Verbandsliga Südbaden
- SV Bonlanden, promoted from the Verbandsliga Württemberg

=== League table ===
Pos	Team	Pld	W	D	L	GF	GA	GD	Pts	Promotion or relegation
1	SSV Ulm 1846 (C, P)	32	21	8	3	60	27	+33	71	Promotion to Regionalliga Südwest
2	VfR Mannheim	32	18	8	6	65	26	+39	62	
3	SpVgg Neckarelz	32	17	11	4	57	32	+25	62	
4	FV Illertissen (P)	32	19	2	11	49	46	+3	59	Promotion to Regionalliga Bayern
5	TSG Balingen	32	16	7	9	58	48	+10	55	
6	FC Nöttingen	32	14	11	7	63	43	+20	53	
7	FC Astoria Walldorf	32	13	5	14	55	49	+6	44	
8	SSV Reutlingen	32	13	4	15	57	55	+2	43	
9	FSV Hollenbach	32	11	8	13	37	46	−9	41	
10	Kehler FV	32	10	6	16	32	47	−15	36	
11	Bahlinger SC	32	8	11	13	46	42	+4	35	
12	FC 08 Villingen	32	9	7	16	39	51	−12	34	
13	Offenburger FV	32	9	7	16	33	57	−24	34	
14	SV Spielberg	32	9	6	17	53	67	−14	33	
15	Stuttgarter Kickers II	32	9	6	17	38	54	−16	33	
16	1. FC Normannia Gmünd (R)	32	9	6	17	42	65	−23	33	Relegation to Verbandsliga
17	SV Bonlanden (R)	32	7	7	18	34	63	−29	28	Relegation to Verbandsliga

Source: Weltfussball.de
Rules for classification: 1st points; 2nd goal difference; 3rd number of goals scored; 4th head-to-head results; 5th goals scored away from home against opponent; 6th goals scored away from home; 7th drawing of lots
(C) Champions; (P) Promoted; (R) Relegated

=== Results ===
Home \ Away	BSC	TSG	SVB	NOR	HOL	FVI	KFV	VFR	NEC	FCN	OFV	REU	SPI	STU	ULM	FCV	WAL
Bahlinger SC		1–1	4–1	3–1	0–0	11–0	1–2	2–1	1–1	1–1	1–1	3–1	2–3	0–3	0–1	0–0	0–0
TSG Balingen	2–1		2–0	3–2	2–1	0–1	3–0	0–0	4–4	1–1	2–3	0–7	3–0	3–1	0–2	1–0	3–2
SV Bonlanden	1–6	3–1		1–3	1–2	0–3	0–1	0–5	1–1	2–2	3–0	1–2	3–3	2–0	1–2	1–1	1–1
1. FC Normannia Gmünd	2–2	0–3	1–2		2–2	0–4	1–0	1–5	1–1	1–4	1–0	1–0	2–2	4–3	2–2	0–1	2–1
FSV Hollenbach	0–1	0–5	1–0	1–0		2–0	0–0	0–3	1–1	1–1	4–1	1–0	2–1	1–1	0–3	1–4	4–2
FV Illertissen	3–1	0–2	1–5	2–1	2–0		2–1	0–2	0–1	1–0	2–1	4–0	4–2	1–0	1–1	0–0	1–0
Kehler FV	0–1	2–4	1–1	3–0	1–0	2–0		0–7	0–1	0–3	1–1	3–1	3–1	3–1	0–0	0–0	0–2
VfR Mannheim	1–1	2–0	4–0	2–0	0–0	0–2	1–0		2–0	1–1	2–2	3–1	4–2	4–0	1–1	2–0	2–1
SpVgg Neckarelz	1–1	2–2	2–0	2–1	1–1	2–1	1–0	1–0		2–5	5–1	4–1	3–0	5–1	0–0	3–0	2–1
FC Nöttingen	2–1	0–2	4–1	2–1	3–0	0–2	3–3	1–1	1–3		3–0	2–0	3–0	4–1	0–3	1–1	3–2
Offenburger FV	2–1	3–0	0–0	1–2	1–0	0–2	1–0	0–3	0–3	1–1		0–3	0–0	1–0	4–1	2–1	1–1
SSV Reutlingen	1–0	1–1	2–0	1–5	2–4	2–3	3–0	2–0	0–0	4–0	3–0		5–2	4–2	1–4	3–0	1–2
SV Spielberg	3–0	1–1	3–0	3–1	2–1	5–1	2–3	1–1	0–1	0–3	0–1	3–2		1–2	1–2	5–2	5–3
Stuttgarter Kickers II	0–0	3–0	0–1	1–1	1–2	0–2	0–2	1–2	1–0	2–1	3–0	0–0	4–1		1–0	2–1	1–1
SSV Ulm 1846	2–0	3–1	2–0	4–1	2–1	2–1	2–0	2–1	3–1	2–2	3–2	0–0	0–0	3–0		2–0	2–0
FC 08 Villingen	2–0	0–1	1–2	4–1	1–3	1–3	3–1	1–2	1–1	0–3	4–2	1–3	1–0	2–2	4–2		2–0
FC Astoria Walldorf	3–0	2–5	2–0	0–1	2–1	2–0	1–0	3–1	1–2	3–3	2–1	6–1	4–1	1–2	1–2	2–0	

Legend: Blue = home team win; Yellow = draw; Red = away team win.

== Promotion to the Oberliga ==
The three Verbandsliga champions SGV Freiberg (Württemberg), TSV Grunbach (Baden) and FC Singen 04 (Südbaden) were directly promoted to the Oberliga. A fourth place in the league for 2012–13 was determined through a promotion round between the three Verbandsliga runners-up, with the FSV 08 Bissingen earning promotion:

First round

2 June 2012	TSG Weinheim	—	SV Oberachern	1–0 (0–0)
6 June 2012	SV Oberachern	—	TSG Weinheim	1–2 (0–1)

Second round

10 June 2012	FSV 08 Bissingen	—	TSG Weinheim	3–1 (0–0)
16 June 2012	TSG Weinheim	—	FSV 08 Bissingen	1–3 (1–2)
