= Fabian Schleusener =

German footballer

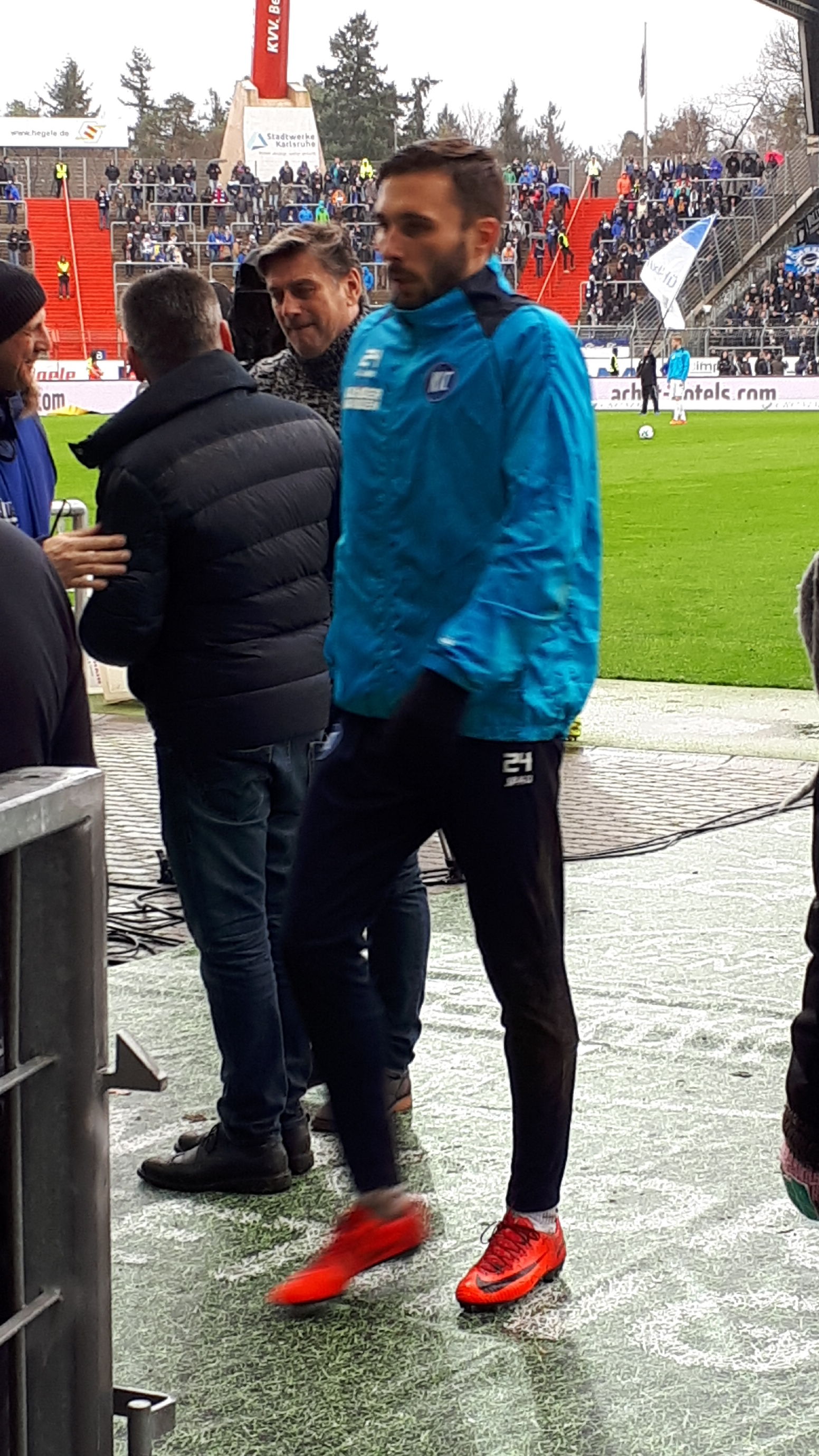
- Karlsruher SC with in 2018

Personal information
- Date of birth: 24 October 1991 (age 35)
- Place of birth: Freiburg im Breisgau, Germany
- Height: 1.86 m (6 ft 1 in)
- Position: Forward

Team information
- Current team: Fortuna Düsseldorf
- Number: 24

Senior career*
Years	Team	Apps	(Gls)
2010–2012	FC Denzlingen	56	(18)
2012–2013	Bahlinger SC	34	(13)
2013–2014	Waldhof Mannheim	10	(1)
2014–2015	Bahlinger SC	48	(34)
2015–2019	SC Freiburg II	29	(13)
2015–2019	SC Freiburg	1	(0)
2016–2017	→ FSV Frankfurt (loan)	18	(8)
2017–2018	→ Karlsruher SC (loan)	37	(17)
2018–2019	→ SV Sandhausen (loan)	26	(10)
2019–2021	1. FC Nürnberg	46	(1)
2021–2026	Karlsruher SC	164	(44)
2026–	Fortuna Düsseldorf	0	(0)
- * Club domestic league appearances and goals as of 18 May 2026

Fabian Schleusener (born 24 October 1991) is a German professional footballer who plays as a forward for 3. Liga club Fortuna Düsseldorf.

== Career ==
In July 2019, Schleusener joined 2. Bundesliga club 1. FC Nürnberg on a three-year contract. The transfer fee paid to SC Freiburg was reported as about €450,000. After Schleusener did not score a goal during the regular season, he found the net in the sixth and last minute of stoppage time in the relegation second leg against Ingolstadt 04, which saved 1. FC Nürnberg from relegation to the 3. Liga.

On 18 June 2026, Schleusener moved to 3. Liga side Fortuna Düsseldorf.

== Career statistics ==
As of 12 July 2020

Appearances and goals by club, season and competition
Club	Season	League			Cup		Other (Note: Appearances in promotion play-offs)		Total	
Club	Season	Division	Apps	Goals	Apps	Goals	Apps	Goals	Apps	Goals
Bahlinger SC	2012–13	Oberliga BW	34	13	–		–		34	13
Waldhof Mannheim	2013–14	Regionalliga SW	10	1	–		–		10	1
Bahlinger SC	2013–14	Oberliga BW	14	7	–		–		14	7
Bahlinger SC	2014–15	Oberliga BW	34	27	–		2	0	36	27
SC Freiburg	2015–16	2. Bundesliga	1	0	0	0	–		1	0
SC Freiburg II	2015–16	Regionalliga SW	29	13	–		–		29	13
FSV Frankfurt (loan)	2016–17	3. Liga	18	8	1	1	–		19	9
Karlsruher SC (loan)	2017–18	3. Liga	37	17	1	0	2	1	40	18
SV Sandhausen (loan)	2018–19	2. Bundesliga	26	10	2	1	–		28	11
1. FC Nürnberg	2019–20	2. Bundesliga	19	0	0	0	2	1	21	1
1. FC Nürnberg II	2019–20	Regionalliga Bayern	1	0	–		–		1	0
Career total			223	96	4	2	6	2	233	100
