= 2012–13 Oberliga Baden-Württemberg =

Oberliga Baden-Württemberg
- Season: 2012–13
- Champions: SpVgg Neckarelz
- Promoted: SpVgg Neckarelz
- Relegated: Offenburger FV; FSV 08 Bissingen; FC Singen 04
- Matches: 306
- Top goalscorer: Dejan Bozic (24 goals)
- Highest attendance: 2,070
- Lowest attendance: 50
- Average attendance: 390

The 2012–13 season of the Oberliga Baden-Württemberg, the highest association football league in the state of Baden-Württemberg, was the fifth season of the league at tier five (V) of the German football league system and the 35th season overall since establishment of the league in 1978. The regular season started on 11 August 2012 and finished on 25 May 2013.

The league was won by SpVgg Neckarelz which thereby earned promotion to the Regionalliga Südwest for 2013–14. Offenburger FV, FSV 08 Bissingen and FC Singen 04 were relegated to the Verbandsligas. Dejan Bozic of runners-up FC Astoria Walldorf was the top goal scorer with 24 goals. FC Nöttingen's game against TSV Grunbach attracted the most spectators for the season with 2,070 while SSV Reutlingen was the best supported club with an average of 698 spectators per game.

== Standings ==
The league featured four new clubs with SGV Freiberg and FSV 08 Bissingen promoted from the Verbandsliga Württemberg, FC Singen 04 from the Verbandsliga Südbaden and TSV Grunbach from the Verbandsliga Baden. The Karlsruher SC II had been relegated from the Regionalliga Süd to the Oberliga Baden-Württemberg in the previous season.

Pos	Team	Pld	W	D	L	GF	GA	GD	Pts	Promotion or relegation
1	SpVgg Neckarelz (C, P)	34	26	4	4	78	29	+49	82	Promotion to Regionalliga Südwest
2	FC Astoria Walldorf	34	23	8	3	74	27	+47	77	
3	VfR Mannheim	34	21	5	8	56	31	+25	68	
4	FC Nöttingen	34	16	12	6	58	33	+25	60	
5	SGV Freiberg	34	17	6	11	68	52	+16	57	
6	Bahlinger SC	34	16	2	16	67	57	+10	50	
7	SSV Reutlingen	34	14	4	16	59	58	+1	46	
8	Kehler FV	34	11	13	10	33	34	−1	46	
9	FSV Hollenbach	34	13	7	14	48	55	−7	46	
10	TSG Balingen	34	13	6	15	50	54	−4	45	
11	FC 08 Villingen	34	12	8	14	44	46	−2	44	
12	Karlsruher SC II	34	11	10	13	44	55	−11	43	
13	TSV Grunbach	34	11	9	14	52	57	−5	42	
14	Stuttgarter Kickers II	34	8	10	16	44	57	−13	34	
15	SV Spielberg	34	8	8	18	46	80	−34	32	
16	Offenburger FV (R)	34	6	11	17	39	57	−18	29	Relegation to Verbandsliga
17	FSV 08 Bissingen (R)	34	7	5	22	39	74	−35	26	Relegation to Verbandsliga
18	FC Singen 04 (R)	34	7	4	23	43	86	−43	25	Relegation to Verbandsliga

Source: Weltfussball.de
Rules for classification: 1st points; 2nd goal difference; 3rd number of goals scored; 4th head-to-head results; 5th goals scored away from home against opponent; 6th goals scored away from home; 7th drawing of lots
(C) Champions; (P) Promoted; (R) Relegated

=== Top goalscorers ===
The top goal scorers for the season:

Rank	Player	Club	Goals
1	(Germany) Dejan Bozic	FC Astoria Walldorf	24
2	(Germany) Marcel Brandstetter	SSV Reutlingen	21
3	(Germany) Spetim Muzliukay	SGV Freiberg	19

== Promotion play-offs ==
Promotion play-offs were held at the end of the season to the Oberliga, involving the runners-up of the Verbandsliga Württemberg, Verbandsliga Südbaden and Verbandsliga Baden. In the first round the runners up of Südbaden and Baden met with the winner then taking on the Württemberg runners-up. The latter, FV Ravensburg, won promotion by defeating Baden runners-up SV 98 Schwetzingen 5–1 in the return leg at Schwetzingen:

First round

5 June 2013	SV 98 Schwetzingen	—	VfR Hausen	4–2
9 June 2013	VfR Hausen	—	SV 98 Schwetzingen	1–0

Second round

12 June 2013	FV Ravensburg	—	SV 98 Schwetzingen	1–2
16 June 2013	SV 98 Schwetzingen	—	FV Ravensburg	5–1
