= Alfonso Garcia (footballer) =

Spanish footballer

Personal information
- Date of birth: 24 October 1969 (age 56)
- Height: 1.84 m (6 ft 0 in)
- Position: Striker

Youth career
- FSV 08 Bissingen
- TSV Unterriexingen

Senior career*
| Years | Team | Apps | (Gls) |
| –1992 | SGV Freiberg | | |
| 1992–2001 | SpVgg Unterhaching | 157 | (22) |
| 2001–2003 | SSV Reutlingen | 53 | (12) |
| 2003–2008 | FSV 08 Bissingen | | |
- * Club domestic league appearances and goals

Alfonso Garcia (born 24 October 1969) is a Spanish former footballer. He played all of his career in Germany, including two seasons in the Bundesliga with SpVgg Unterhaching.
