= Michael Wittwer =

German footballer and manager

Personal information
- Date of birth: 18 February 1967 (age 59)
- Height: 1.84 m (6 ft 0 in)
- Position: Defender

Team information
- Current team: Karlsruher SC II (assistant coach)

Youth career
- FC Dietlingen

Senior career*
Years	Team	Apps	(Gls)
–1987	SpVgg Dietesheim		
1987–2000	Karlsruher SC	147	(1)
2000–2005	FC Nöttingen		
2007	FC Nöttingen		

Managerial career
- 2004–2005: FC Nöttingen
- 2005–2010: Karlsruher SC II (assistant)
- 2010–: FC Nöttingen
- * Club domestic league appearances and goals

Michael Wittwer (born 18 February 1967) is a German former professional footballer, who is currently the manager of fourth-tier club FC Nöttingen.

== Honours ==
- DFB-Pokal finalist: 1996.
