= Sebastian Fischer =

Sebastian Fischer may refer to:

- Sebastian Fischer (actor) (1928–2018), German actor
- Sebastian Fischer (footballer) (born 1987), German footballer
- Sebastian Fischer (physician & naturalist) (1806-1871), German physician & naturalist
