= Gerd Dais =

German footballer and manager

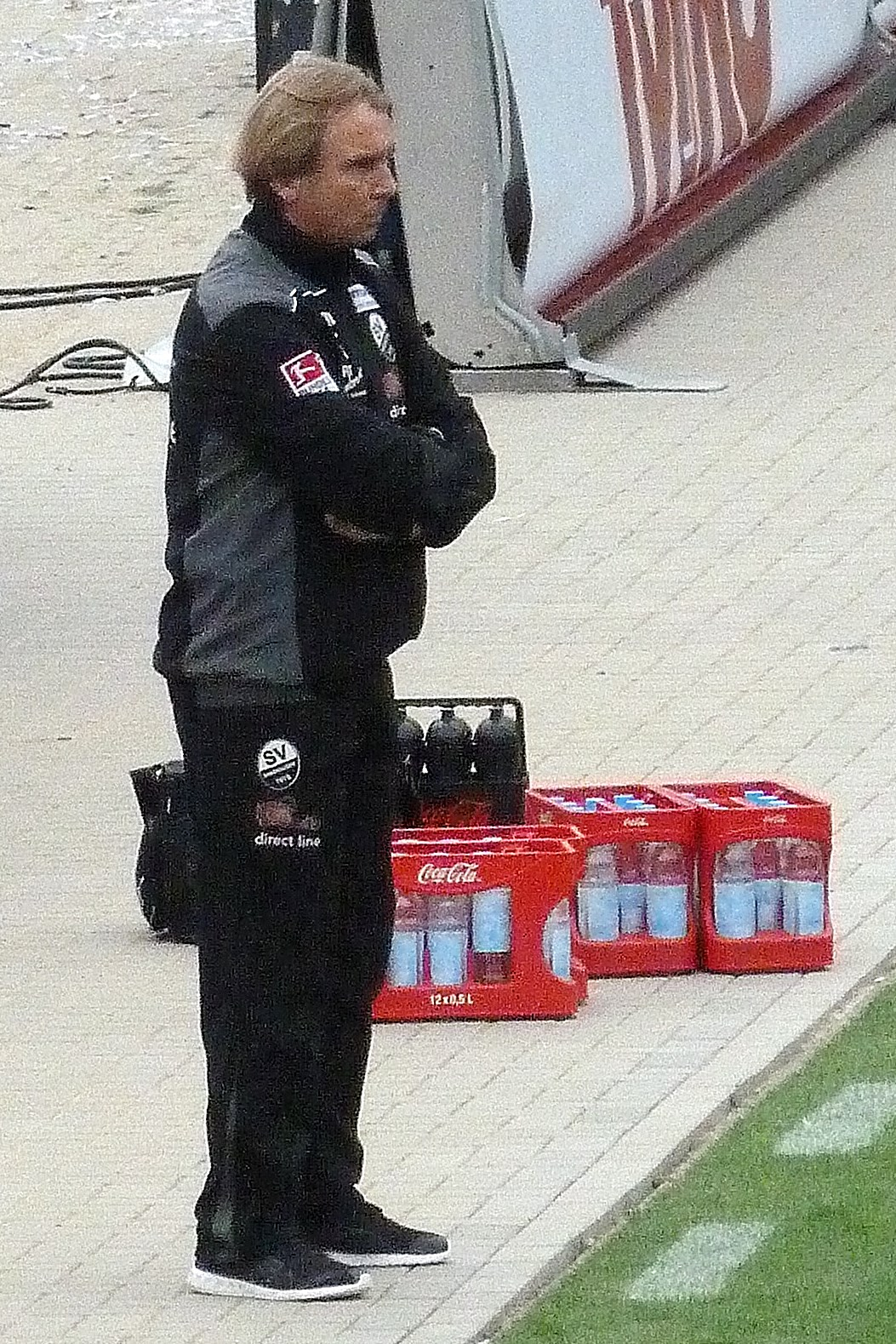
- Dais in 2012

Personal information
- Date of birth: 11 August 1963 (age 63)
- Place of birth: Heidelberg, West Germany
- Height: 1.81 m (5 ft 11 in)
- Position: Midfielder

Youth career
- Heidelberg-Kirchheim
- VfR Mannheim

Senior career*
Years	Team	Apps	(Gls)
1982–1984	Karlsruher SC	13	(0)
1984–1985	FC Homburg	9	(2)
1985–1987	SV Sandhausen	58	(37)
1987–1993	Waldhof Mannheim	119	(24)
Total		199	(63)

Managerial career
- 1996–1997: SV Sandhausen (assistant manager)
- 1997–1999: SG Dielheim (player-coach)
- 2000: FC Nöttingen (player-coach)
- 2000–2002: FV Lauda
- 2002–2004: FC Nöttingen
- 2005–2010: SV Sandhausen
- 2011–2012: SV Sandhausen
- 2012–2013: Stuttgarter Kickers
- 2016: FC Nöttingen
- 2016–2017: Waldhof Mannheim
- * Club domestic league appearances and goals

Gerd Dais (born 11 August 1963) is a German football manager and former player.
