= 2013–14 Oberliga Baden-Württemberg =

Oberliga Baden-Württemberg
- Season: 2013–14
- Champions: FC Astoria Walldorf
- Promoted: FC Nöttingen
- Relegated: TSV Grunbach; 1. FC Heidenheim II; 1. FC Bruchsal; SV Oberachern
- Matches: 302
- Top goalscorer: Michael Schürg (28 goals)
- Highest attendance: 5,420
- Lowest attendance: 60
- Average attendance: 433

The 2013–14 season of the Oberliga Baden-Württemberg, the highest association football league in the state of Baden-Württemberg, was the sixth season of the league at tier five (V) of the German football league system and the 36th season overall since establishment of the league in 1978. The regular season started on 9 August 2013 and finished on 24 May 2014.

The league was won by FC Astoria Walldorf which thereby earned promotion to the Regionalliga Südwest for 2014–15. Runners-up TSV Grunbach declined to take part in the promotion round to the Regionalliga and instead withdrew to the Kreisliga after failed merger talks with 1. CfR Pforzheim. Third placed FC Nöttingen took part in the promotion round instead and defeated FSV Salmrohr, thereby earning promotion to the Regionalliga. 1. FC Heidenheim completely withdrew its reserve team from league football while 1. FC Bruchsal and SV Oberachern were relegated to the Verbandsligas.

== Standings ==
The league featured four new clubs with FV Ravensburg and 1. FC Heidenheim II promoted from the Verbandsliga Württemberg, SV Oberachern from the Verbandsliga Südbaden and 1. FC Bruchsal from the Verbandsliga Baden. No club had been relegated from the Regionalliga Südwest to the Oberliga Baden-Württemberg in the previous season.

Pos	Team	Pld	W	D	L	GF	GA	GD	Pts	Promotion, qualification or relegation
1	FC Astoria Walldorf (C, P)	34	21	6	7	70	40	+30	69	Promotion to Regionalliga Südwest
2	TSV Grunbach	34	20	6	8	75	44	+31	66	Withdrew to Kreisliga at end of season
3	FC Nöttingen (P)	34	20	5	9	77	46	+31	65	Qualification to promotion playoffs
4	SGV Freiberg	34	15	10	9	72	59	+13	55	
5	Karlsruher SC II	34	15	5	14	54	51	+3	50	
6	FC 1908 Villingen	34	14	7	13	64	58	+6	49	
7	SSV Reutlingen	34	13	9	12	55	52	+3	48	
8	FSV Hollenbach	34	13	9	12	49	56	−7	48	
9	FV Ravensburg	34	13	7	14	58	53	+5	46	
10	Stuttgarter Kickers II	34	13	5	16	51	61	−10	44	
11	Kehler FV	34	11	9	14	39	46	−7	42	
12	1. FC Heidenheim II	34	12	6	16	64	73	−9	42	Withdrew from competition at end of season
13	TSG Balingen	34	11	8	15	47	55	−8	41	
14	Bahlinger SC	34	10	9	15	49	65	−16	39	
15	VfR Mannheim	34	7	17	10	50	51	−1	38	
16	SV Spielberg	34	10	8	16	60	64	−4	38	
17	1. FC Bruchsal (R)	34	9	8	17	46	73	−27	35	Relegation to Verbandsliga
18	SV Oberachern (R)	34	8	8	18	32	65	−33	32	Relegation to Verbandsliga

Source: Fussballdaten.de
Rules for classification: 1st points; 2nd goal difference; 3rd number of goals scored; 4th head-to-head results; 5th goals scored away from home against opponent; 6th goals scored away from home; 7th drawing of lots
(C) Champions; (P) Promoted; (R) Relegated

=== Top goalscorers ===
The top goal scorers for the season:

Rank	Player	Club	Goals
1	(Germany) Michael Schürg	FC Nöttingen	28
2	(Germany) Alexander Zimmermann	SV Spielberg	20
3	(Germany) Denis Schwager	1. FC Bruchsal	17
3	(Germany) Marcel Brandstetter	SSV Reutlingen	17

== Promotion play-offs ==
Promotion play-offs were held at the end of the season for both the Regionalliga above and the Oberliga.

=== To the Regionalliga ===
The runners-up of the Hessenliga, Oberliga Rheinland-Pfalz/Saar and the Oberliga Baden-Württemberg were scheduled to play each other for one more spot in the Regionalliga. The Hessenliga runners-up declined this opportunity leaving just two teams to play off, with FC Nöttingen winning promotion to the Regionalliga:

29 May 2014	FC Nöttingen	0−0	FSV Salmrohr	Panoramastadion, Nöttingen
18:00		Report		Attendance: 1,400; Referee: Christof Günsch

1 June 2014	FSV Salmrohr	0−1	FC Nöttingen	Rasenplatz, Salmrohr
16:00		Report	Schürg 78'	Attendance: 2,800; Referee: Kai Vonderschmidt

=== To the Oberliga ===
The runners-up of the Verbandsliga Baden, Verbandsliga Südbaden and Verbandsliga Württemberg played each other for one more spot in the Oberliga, with FC Germania Friedrichstal winning promotion to the Oberliga:

First round

5 June 2014	FC Germania Friedrichstal	4−3	SV Linx	Stutensee-Stadion, Stutensee
18:30	Baumgärtner 52'; M. Pavkovic 74' 78'; Cristescu 90+3'	Report	Rubio 6'; Venturini 21'; Clauss 26'	Attendance: 800; Referee: Marco Zauner

9 June 2014	SV Linx	1−1	FC Germania Friedrichstal	Hans-Weber-Stadion, Linx
16:00	Kalu 84'	Report	M. Pavkovic 64'	Attendance: Christine Baitinger; Referee: 980

Second round

15 June 2014	SV Göppingen	1−1	FC Germania Friedrichstal	Göppingen
15:00	Cristescu 49' (o.g.)	Report	Ritter 49'	Attendance: 1,150; Referee: Tobias Doering

22 June 2014	FC Germania Friedrichstal	2−0	SV Göppingen	Stutensee-Stadion, Stutensee
15:00	M. Pavkovic 60'; D. Pavkovic 90'	Report		Attendance: 1,200; Referee: Philipp Traeder
