= 2015–16 Oberliga Baden-Württemberg =

Oberliga Baden-Württemberg
- Season: 2015–16
- Champions: SSV Ulm 1846
- Promoted: SSV Ulm 1846; FC Nöttingen
- Relegated: Freiburger FC; Kehler FV; SGV Freiberg; FC 08 Villingen; Germania Friedrichstal; SC Pfullendorf
- Matches: 306
- Top goalscorer: David Braig (26 goals)
- Highest attendance: 3,620
- Lowest attendance: 50
- Total attendance: 135,995
- Average attendance: 446

The 2015–16 season of the Oberliga Baden-Württemberg, the highest association football league in the state of Baden-Württemberg, was the eighth season of the league at tier five (V) of the German football league system and the 38th season overall since establishment of the league in 1978.

The season began on 8 August 2015 and finished on 21 May 2016, interrupted by a winter break from 12 December to 13 February.

== Standings ==
The league featured five new clubs for the 2015–16 season with FSV 08 Bissingen promoted from the Verbandsliga Württemberg, SV Oberachern from the Verbandsliga Südbaden and SV Sandhausen II from the Verbandsliga Baden along with 1. CfR Pforzheim while FC Nöttingen had been relegated from the Regionalliga Südwest.

Pos	Team	Pld	W	D	L	GF	GA	GD	Pts	Promotion, qualification or relegation
1	SSV Ulm 1846 (C, P)	34	23	6	5	78	32	+46	75	Promotion to Regionalliga Südwest
2	FC Nöttingen (O, P)	34	21	5	8	87	50	+37	68	Qualification to promotion playoffs
3	FSV 08 Bissingen	34	20	3	11	58	38	+20	63	
4	Karlsruher SC II	34	19	4	11	60	39	+21	61	
5	1. CfR Pforzheim	34	16	6	12	58	39	+19	54	
6	FSV Hollenbach	34	17	3	14	57	53	+4	54	
7	SV Oberachern	34	14	10	10	67	53	+14	52	
8	TSG Balingen	34	15	6	13	49	39	+10	51	
9	FV Ravensburg	34	15	5	14	62	54	+8	50	
10	SV Sandhausen II	34	14	7	13	59	47	+12	49	
11	SSV Reutlingen	34	12	7	15	57	54	+3	43	
12	Stuttgarter Kickers II (Note: Reserve teams of 3. Liga clubs are ineligible for Regionalliga promotion.)	34	12	7	15	47	62	−15	43	
13	Freiburger FC (R)	34	13	3	18	46	53	−7	42	Relegation to Verbandsliga
14	Kehler FV (R)	34	12	6	16	41	51	−10	42	Relegation to Verbandsliga
15	SGV Freiberg (R)	34	11	8	15	47	63	−16	41	Relegation to Verbandsliga
16	FC 08 Villingen (R)	34	11	8	15	45	67	−22	41	Relegation to Verbandsliga
17	FC Germania Friedrichstal (R)	34	5	8	21	29	91	−62	23	Relegation to Verbandsliga
18	SC Pfullendorf (R)	34	3	4	27	21	83	−62	13	Relegation to Verbandsliga

Source: kicker.de, soccerway.com
Rules for classification: 1) Points; 2) Goal difference; 3) Goals scored; 4) head-to-head results; 5) goals scored away from home against opponent; 6) goals scored away from home; 7) drawing of lots
(C) Champions; (O) Play-off winners; (P) Promoted; (R) Relegated

=== Top goalscorers ===
The top goal scorers for the season:

Rank	Player	Club	Goals
1	(Germany) David Braig	SSV Ulm 1846	26
2	(Germany) Steffen Wohlfarth	FV Ravensburg	19
3	(Germany) Luca Pfeiffer	FSV Hollenbach	18
4	(Germany) Ridje Sprich	Freiburger FC	17

== Promotion play-off ==
Promotion play-off will be held at the end of the season for both the Regionalliga above and the Oberliga.

=== To the Regionalliga ===
The runners-up of the Hessenliga, Oberliga Baden-Württemberg and Oberliga Rheinland-Pfalz/Saar competed for one more spot in the Regionalliga Südwest, with each team playing the other just once:

Pos	Team	Pld	W	D	L	GF	GA	GD	Pts	Promotion, qualification or relegation	FCN	RWF	SCH
1	FC Nöttingen (P)	2	1	1	0	7	6	+1	4	Promotion to Regionalliga	—	3–2	—
2	Rot-Weiss Frankfurt	2	1	0	1	5	5	0	3		—	—	3–2
3	SC Hauenstein	2	0	1	1	6	7	−1	1		4–4	—	—

Source: Weltfussball.de
Rules for classification: 1) Points; 2) Head-to-head; 3) Decider;
(P) Promoted

=== To the Oberliga ===
The runners-up of the Verbandsliga Baden, Verbandsliga Südbaden and Verbandsliga Württemberg play each other for one more spot in the Oberliga, whereby the Baden and Südbaden runners-up play each other first with the winner of this encounter then meets the Württemberg runners-up.

Round one

Team 1	Agg.	Team 2	1st leg	2nd leg
1. FC Rielasingen-Arlen	2–2 (a)	TSG Weinheim	2–2	0–0

Round two

Team 1	Agg.	Team 2	1st leg	2nd leg
TSG Weinheim	2–3	SV Göppingen	2–2	0–1
