= SV 98 Schwetzingen =

German football club

- Full name: Sportverein 1898 Schwetzingen e.V.
- Founded: 1898
- Ground: Stadion an der Ketscher Landstraße
- Capacity: 10,000
- Chairman: Rainer Zimmermann
- Manager: Steffen Kohl
- League: Verbandsliga Baden (VI)
- 2015–16: 7th
Home colours	Away colours

SV 98 Schwetzingen is a German association football club from the town of Schwetzingen, Baden-Württemberg. The club's greatest success has been promotion to the Oberliga Baden-Württemberg in 1982 and 1986, playing at this level for eight seasons.

The club has also qualified for the DFB-Pokal once in 1984, courtesy to a North Baden Cup win.

== History ==
Formed in 1998 SV Schwetzingen made a brief appearance in the tier one Kreisliga Odenwald from 1920 to 1922.

In post-Second World War football SV Schwetzingen earned promotion in 1947 to the northern division of the Amateurliga Nordbaden, then the second tier of the league system. It qualified for the unified Amateurliga in 1948 but was relegated from the league in 1949. SVS returned to the Amateurliga which had now slipped to third tier in 1950 and finished runners-up in the league in 1952 but was relegated again in 1955. The club made an immediate return in 1956 but suffered another relegation in 1958. Schwetzingen won another promotion to the Amateurliga Nordbaden in 1963 and won the league in its first season back but failed to win promotion to the Regionalliga. It remained in the league as an upper table side for the remainder of the 1960s but declined during the 1970s, on occasion coming close to relegation. The club however survived and, in the last season of the Amateurliga in 1977–78 missed out on qualification to the new Oberliga Baden-Württemberg by just a point.

SVS became something of a fixture in the new Verbandsliga Baden, playing in this league or the league above, the Oberliga, for the next twenty five seasons. A runners-up finish in 1982 took the club up to the Oberliga for the first time but it was immediately relegated again. The club qualified for the DFB-Pokal in 1984 after its second North Baden Cup win, the first having come in 1969, but lost 1–2 in the first round to Alemannia Aachen. Two season later, in 1986, a league championship in the Verbandsliga moved the club up again and, this time, it survived for seven seasons. The club had a particularly successful era between 1988 and 1991 when it finished in the top four of the Oberliga in three consecutive seasons. It declined after this and, in 1993, was relegated once more.

Schwetzingen played the next ten seasons in the Verbandsliga, generally as an upper table side, achieving six top four finishes in this time. In 2002–03 however the club could only finish fifteenth in the league and was relegated from the top league of North Baden for the first time in four decades. Three seasons in the Landesliga followed before a runners-up finish in 2006 took the club back up to the Verbandsliga. Schwetzingen came close to Oberliga promotion in 2013 once more when it finished runners-up but lost in the promotion round to FV Ravensburg. Since then the club continues to play in the Verbandsliga.

== Honours ==
The club's honours:

=== League ===
- Verbandsliga
  - Champions: 1986
  - Runners-up: 1982, 2013
- Amateurliga Nordbaden
  - Champions: 1964
  - Runners-up: 1952

=== Cup ===
- North Baden Cup
  - Winners: 1969, 1984

== Recent seasons ==
The recent season-by-season performance of the club:

Season	Division	Tier	Position
2003–04	Landesliga Rhein-Neckar	VI	5th
2004–05	Landesliga Rhein-Neckar	VI	8th
2005–06	Landesliga Rhein-Neckar	VI	2nd↑
2006–07	Verbandsliga Baden	V	3rd
2007–08	Verbandsliga Baden	V	11th
2008–09	Verbandsliga Baden	VI	6th
2009–10	Verbandsliga Baden	VI	8th
2010–11	Verbandsliga Baden	VI	8th
2011–12	Verbandsliga Baden	VI	3rd
2012–13	Verbandsliga Baden	VI	2nd
2013–14	Verbandsliga Baden	VI	6th
2014–15	Verbandsliga Baden	VI	8th
2015–16	Verbandsliga Baden	VI	7th
2016–17	Verbandsliga Baden	VI	

- With the introduction of the Regionalligas in 1994 and the 3. Liga in 2008 as the new third tier, below the 2. Bundesliga, all leagues below dropped one tier.

↑ Promoted	↓ Relegated
