= Sebastian Fischer (footballer) =

German footballer

Personal information
- Date of birth: 7 May 1987 (age 39)
- Place of birth: West Germany
- Height: 1.72 m (5 ft 8 in)
- Position: Midfielder

Youth career
- TSV Mühlhausen/Enz
- SV Illingen
- –2004: VfR Pforzheim
- 2004–2006: Karlsruher SC

Senior career*
Years	Team	Apps	(Gls)
2006–2009	Karlsruher SC II	94	(8)
2009–2011	SV Sandhausen	48	(4)
2010–2011	SV Sandhausen II	4	(0)

International career^{‡}
2006	Germany U19	6	(0)
- * Club domestic league appearances and goals ‡ National team caps and goals as of 23:31, 28 September 2017 (UTC)

Sebastian Fischer (born 7 May 1987) is a German footballer who plays as a midfielder.
