= 2014–15 Oberliga Baden-Württemberg =

Oberliga Baden-Württemberg
- Season: 2014–15
- Champions: SV Spielberg
- Promoted: SV Spielberg; Bahlinger SC
- Relegated: VfR Mannheim; SV Kickers Pforzheim; VfR Aalen II (withdrew)
- Top goalscorer: Fabian Schleusener (27 goals)
- Highest attendance: 2,841
- Lowest attendance: 60
- Total attendance: 118,618
- Average attendance: 471

The 2014–15 season of the Oberliga Baden-Württemberg, the highest association football league in the state of Baden-Württemberg, was the seventh season of the league at tier five (V) of the German football league system and the 37th season overall since establishment of the league in 1978. The regular season started on 8 August 2014 and finished on 23 May 2015.

== Standings ==
The league featured six new clubs for the 2014–15 season with VfR Aalen II promoted from the Verbandsliga Württemberg, Freiburger FC from the Verbandsliga Südbaden and SV Kickers Pforzheim and FC Germania Friedrichstal from the Verbandsliga Baden while SSV Ulm 1846 and SC Pfullendorf had been relegated from the Regionalliga Südwest.

Pos	Team	Pld	W	D	L	GF	GA	GD	Pts	Promotion, qualification or relegation
1	SV Spielberg (C, P)	34	23	7	4	81	34	+47	76	Promotion to Regionalliga Südwest
2	Bahlinger SC (P)	34	22	9	3	80	25	+55	75	Qualification to promotion playoffs
3	SGV Freiberg	34	20	8	6	64	33	+31	68	
4	TSG Balingen	34	17	7	10	58	44	+14	58	
5	SSV Ulm 1846	34	16	8	10	61	43	+18	56	
6	Karlsruher SC II	34	14	12	8	61	45	+16	54	
7	FV Ravensburg	34	16	6	12	61	45	+16	54	
8	FSV Hollenbach	34	13	12	9	56	48	+8	51	
9	SSV Reutlingen	34	12	7	15	48	51	−3	43	
10	Kehler FV	34	10	12	12	40	44	−4	42	
11	SC Pfullendorf	34	12	6	16	43	66	−23	42	
12	FC Germania Friedrichstal	34	10	9	15	53	57	−4	39	
13	VfR Aalen II	34	10	8	16	42	64	−22	38	Withdrew from competition at end of season (Note: VfR Aalen II was withdrawn from competition on 27 May 2015 for financial reasons.)
14	Stuttgarter Kickers II	34	9	9	16	47	65	−18	36	
15	Freiburger FC	34	7	10	17	49	66	−17	31	
16	FC 08 Villingen	34	5	13	16	46	63	−17	28	
17	VfR Mannheim (R)	34	7	5	22	30	63	−33	26	Relegation to Verbandsliga
18	SV Kickers Pforzheim (R)	34	5	8	21	30	94	−64	23	Relegation to Verbandsliga

Source: Fussball.de
Rules for classification: 1st points; 2nd goal difference; 3rd number of goals scored; 4th head-to-head results; 5th goals scored away from home against opponent; 6th goals scored away from home; 7th drawing of lots
(C) Champions; (P) Promoted; (R) Relegated

=== Top goalscorers ===
The top goal scorers for the season:

Rank	Player	Club	Goals
1	(Germany) Fabian Schleusener	Bahlinger SC	27
2	(Germany) Hakan Kutlu	SGV Freiberg	20
3	(Germany) Stefan Vogler	SC Pfullendorf	19

== Promotion play-offs ==
Promotion play-offs will be held at the end of the season for both the Regionalliga above and the Oberliga.

=== To the Regionalliga ===
The runners-up of the Hessenliga, Oberliga Rheinland-Pfalz/Saar and the Oberliga Baden-Württemberg, TSV Lehnerz, SC Hauenstein and Bahlinger SC, played each other for one more spot in the Regionalliga. While the first game had been scheduled the second and third depended on the outcome of the first. Bahlinger SC won promotion to the Regionalliga courtesy to a win and a draw.

27 May 2015	TSV Lehnerz	1–1	SC Hauenstein	Stadion Richard-Müller-Straße, Fulda-Lehnerz
19:00	Mistretta 46'	Report	Zimmermann 68'	Attendance: 4,000; Referee: Tobias Fritsch

31 May 2015	Bahlinger SC	0–0	TSV Lehnerz	Kaiserstuhlstadion, Bahlingen
14:00		Report		Attendance: 4,250; Referee: Timo Klein

4 June 2014	SC Hauenstein	0–3	Bahlinger SC	Am Neding, Hauenstein
14:00		Report	Sautner 2', 40' (pen.); Fellanxa 90'	Attendance: 2,500; Referee: Moritz Kühlmeyer

=== To the Oberliga ===
The runners-up of the Verbandsliga Baden, Verbandsliga Südbaden and Verbandsliga Württemberg play each other for one more spot in the Oberliga, whereby the Baden and Südbaden runners-up play each other first with the winner of this encounter then meets the Württemberg runners-up.

First round

4 June 2015	1. CfR Pforzheim	3–0	FC Radolfzell	Holzhofstadion, Pforzheim
		Report		Attendance: 1,100

7 June 2015	FC Radolfzell	1–4	1. CfR Pforzheim	Mettnau-Stadion, Radolfzell
		Report		Attendance: 600

Second round

14 June 2015	SV Göppingen	1–0	1. CfR Pforzheim	Stadion an der Hohenstaufenstraße, Göppingen
15:00	Isci 85'	Report		Attendance: 2,000; Referee: Luigi Satriano

21 June 2015	1. CfR Pforzheim	3–0	SV Göppingen	Holzhofstadion, Pforzheim
15:00		Report		Attendance: 3,400
