= SC Pfullendorf =

German sports club

- Full name: Sportclub Pfullendorf 1919 e.V.
- Founded: 2 August 1919; 106 years ago
- Ground: Geberit-Arena
- Capacity: 8,000
- Chairman: Karl Fritz
- Manager: Miroslav Topalusic
- League: Verbandsliga Südbaden (VI)
- 2024–25: Verbandsliga Südbaden, 10th of 17
Home colours	Away colours

SC Pfullendorf is a German sports club based in Pfullendorf, Baden-Württemberg. The 700-member club is best known for its football department, but also has departments for chess, table tennis and ice stock sport, a winter sport similar to curling.

== History ==
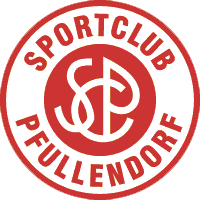
Former logo until 2009

The club was founded on 2 August 1919, as part of the gymnastics club TV Pfullendorf. It became independent in 1921 under the name SC Pfullendorf and was officially registered as a club on 25 February 1924.

After World War II was renamed SV Pfullendorf and played eight matches under this name in the 1945–46 season of the amateur Einheitsklasse Bodensee/Schwarzwald league. The club was then disbanded, but promptly reorganized as FC Pfullendorf on 21 September 1946, and re-claimed the name SC Pfullendorf, on 23 June 1950.

Throughout the 1950s, 60s and 70s, Pfullendorf competed as a fourth or fifth division side until breaking through to the Amateurliga Südbaden (III) in 1976 on the strength of a championship in the 2nd Amateurliga Südbaden-Süd (IV). The club's first German Cup appearance followed in 1978 when they were put out in the first round by Second Bundesliga side FC Homburg.

SCP spent thirteen seasons in third division football between 1976 and 1994, playing largely as a lower table side. Their best result at that level was a fifth-place finish in 1993 in what had become the Amateur Oberliga Baden-Württemberg (III).

During this period Pfullendorf made a trio of German Cup appearances. In 1980–81, they beat Blumenthaler SV 2:0 in the first round before going out 0:1 to SV Siegburg in the second round. Their next two turns resulted in early exits from the competition. In 1983–84, they were thrashed 0:7 by Bundesliga side Eintracht Braunschweig, and in 1990–91 lost to 2. Bundesliga club MSV Duisburg.

The second half of the 90s was difficult for the club as they slipped to the Verbandsliga Südbaden in 1994 and then spent the next three seasons toiling in the Oberliga Baden-Württemberg (IV). Pfullendorf returned to the Regionalliga Süd for the 1998–99 season where, despite being a tough opponent, they finished in 16th place with a +1 goal differential and appeared headed for relegation. However, division winner Kickers Offenbach played their way into the 2nd Bundesliga leaving room for SCP to stay up. The following season was even more exciting for supporters as the club began winning the close matches it had dropped the year before and rocketed to a second-place finish. This earned an appearance in the promotion round for the second division where they drew 1:1 with LR Ahlen and lost 1:3 to Union Berlin.

The next year the club collapsed and was relegated to the Oberliga Baden-Württemberg (IV) after finishing in 17th place. Their fifth German Cup appearance then ended in the first round at the hands of the Bundesliga's SC Freiburg.

However, Pfullendorf quickly bounced back to third division play in 2002. After earning a pair of mid-table finishes in the Regionalliga Süd (III), the club has flirted with relegation in its past two campaigns and would have been sent down after a 16th-place result in 2005 if not for 14th-place finisher 1. SC Feucht not seeking a license.

The club managed to surprise Bundesliga side Arminia Bielefeld 2–1 in their first round German Cup match up on 10 September 2006 marking the first time Pfullendorf has defeated a professional side in the competition. They were subsequently put out 0–2 by 2nd Bundesliga club Kickers Offenbach in late October.

After ten consecutive seasons in the Regionalliga Süd at the end of the 2011–12 season the club was grouped into the new Regionalliga Südwest, which replaced the Regionalliga Süd in the region. SC played at this level for two seasons before being relegated after finishing last in the league in 2014. After finishing 11th in the Oberliga in 2014–15 the club came last in 2015–16 and was relegated to the Verbandsliga.

=== Reserve team ===
The SC Pfullendorf II played in the Verbandsliga Südbaden for seven consecutive season, having reached this league level in 1999 for the first time, but suffered relegation to the Landesliga in 2011.

== Stadium ==
SC Pfullendorf plays in the Waldstadion an der Kasernenstraße (capacity 8,000). In recent years, the facility has been known under a sponsorship agreement as the Geberit-Arena.

== Honours ==
The club's honours:

=== League ===
- Regionalliga Süd (III)
  - Runners-up: 2000
- Oberliga Baden-Württemberg (IV)
  - Champions: 2002
- Verbandsliga Südbaden (IV)
  - Champions: (5) 1980, 1982, 1988, 1990, 1995
- Landesliga Südbaden 3
  - Champions: 2004^{‡}

=== Cup ===
- South Baden Cup (Tiers III–VII)
  - Winners: (5) 1983, 1990, 2006, 2008, 2010
  - Runners-up: 2007

- ^{‡} Won by reserve team.

== Recent managers ==
Recent managers of the club:

Manager	Start	Finish
Günter Rommel	1 July 2001	30 June 2005
Marco Kurz	1 July 2005	30 June 2006
Michael Feichtenbeiner	1 July 2006	24 April 2008
(Iceland) Helgi Kolviðsson	25 April 2008	30 June 2008
Walter Schneck	1 July 2008	30 June 2010
(Iceland) Helgi Kolviðsson	1 July 2010	30 June 2011
(Serbia) Kristijan Đorđević	1 July 2011	13 October 2011
(Croatia) Adnan Sijaric	14 October 2011	3 October 2013
Klaus Steidle	3 October 2013	30 October 2013
Stephan Baierl	2 November 2013	30 June 2014
Patrick Hagg	1 July 2014	5 August 2016
Marco Konrad	8 August 2016	30 June 2019
(Montenegro) Adnan Sijaric	1 July 2019	9 May 2022
(Turkey) Hakan Karaosman	10 May 2022	30 June 2024
Andreas Keller	1 July 2024	23 March 2025
(Iceland) Helgi Kolviðsson	24 March 2025	25 January 2026
Miroslav Topalusic	26 January 2026	Present

== Recent seasons ==
The recent season-by-season performance of the club:

=== SC Pfullendorf ===
Season	Division	Tier	Position
1999–2000	Regionalliga Süd	III	2nd
2000–01	Regionalliga Süd	III	17th ↓
2001–02	Oberliga Baden-Württemberg	IV	1st ↑
2002–03	Regionalliga Süd	III	11th
2003–04	Regionalliga Süd	III	10th
2004–05	Regionalliga Süd	III	16th
2005–06	Regionalliga Süd	III	14th
2006–07	Regionalliga Süd	III	7th
2007–08	Regionalliga Süd	III	17th
2008–09	Regionalliga Süd	IV	8th
2009–10	Regionalliga Süd	IV	13th
2010–11	Regionalliga Süd	IV	9th
2011–12	Regionalliga Süd	IV	16th
2012–13	Regionalliga Südwest	IV	13th
2013–14	Regionalliga Südwest	IV	18th ↓
2014–15	Oberliga Baden-Württemberg	V	11th
2015–16	Oberliga Baden-Württemberg	V	18th ↓
2016–17	Verbandsliga Südbaden	VI	

=== SC Pfullendorf II ===
Season	Division	Tier	Position
1999–2000	Verbandsliga Südbaden	V	9th
2000–01	Verbandsliga Südbaden	V	6th
2001–02	Verbandsliga Südbaden	V	14th ↓
2002–03	Landesliga Südbaden 3	VI	
2003–04	Landesliga Südbaden 3	VI	1st ↑
2004–05	Verbandsliga Südbaden	V	6th
2005–06	Verbandsliga Südbaden	V	10th
2006–07	Verbandsliga Südbaden	V	3rd
2007–08	Verbandsliga Südbaden	V	3rd
2008–09	Verbandsliga Südbaden	VI	8th
2009–10	Verbandsliga Südbaden	VI	6th
2010–11	Verbandsliga Südbaden	VI	13th ↓
2011–12	Landesliga Südbaden 3	VII	3rd
2012–13	Landesliga Südbaden 3	VII	5th
2013–14	Landesliga Südbaden 3	VII	5th
2014–15	Landesliga Südbaden 3	VII	15th ↓
2015–16	Bezirksliga Bodensee	VIII	6th
2016–17	Bezirksliga Bodensee	VIII	

- With the introduction of the Regionalligas in 1994 and the 3. Liga in 2008 as the new third tier, below the 2. Bundesliga, all leagues below dropped one tier. In 2012, the number of Regionalligas was increased from three to five with all Regionalliga Süd clubs except the Bavarian ones entering the new Regionalliga Südwest.

↑ Promoted	↓ Relegated
