= SV Bonlanden =

German football club

- Full name: Sportverein Bonlanden e.V.
- Nickname(s): Die Weißen
- Founded: 4 August 1895
- Ground: Stadion an der Humboldtstraße
- Capacity: 2,000
- Chairman: Herbert Theobaldt
- Manager: Norbert Stippel
- League: Bezirksliga (VIII)
- 2015–16: Landesliga Württemberg 2 (VII), 13th (relegated)
Home colours	Away colours

SV Bonlanden is a German association football club from the district of Bonlanden in the town of Filderstadt.

== History ==
The association was founded on 4 August 1895 as the gymnastics club Turnverein Bonländer and soon developed an athletics department. They united with another local gymnastics club, Freie Turnerschaft 1908 Bonlanden, in 1911.

Other local footballers established the club Fussball Club Pfeil in 1921, which was followed sometime later by the formation of Rot Sport which held a communist political ideology. In 1930 TV saw its newly formed football department briefly go its own way as Arbeiter Sportverein Bonlanden before it became part of Rot Sport. Under the policies of the Third Reich, sports associations with left-leaning or religious affiliations were consolidated for political reasons and these teams were joined in 1933 as Turngemeinde Bonlanden. Following World War II, occupying Allied authorities ordered the dissolution of most organizations in the country, including sports and football associations. The old club was re-established on 7 September 1945 as Sportverein Bonlanden.

Football did not become prominent within the sports club until the late 70s, and through the 80s the team played lower tier amateur ball. In 1988, Bonlanden won promotion to the Verbandsliga Württemberg (V) for a two-year stint. They were again promoted in 1994 and celebrated their centenary by winning their way to the Oberliga Baden-Württemberg (IV) the following season. The club enjoyed its most successful campaign in 1996 with a state cup win in the Württemberg Pokal, which earned a first round appearance in DFB Pokal (German Cup) play where the side was put out 2:4 by VfL Bochum.

Bonlanden spent six seasons in the Oberliga until being relegated in 2001 and has since played as an "elevator club" moving frequently up and down between fourth- and fifth-tier play. The club shuttled between Verbandliga and Oberliga with regularity from 1995 to 2012, but was eventually relegated from the Verbandsliga to the Landesliga in 2014 after coming last in the league. The 2015–16 season saw the club finish on a relegation rank in the Landesliga and dropping down to the Bezirksliga.

== Honours ==
The club's honours:

=== League ===
- Verbandsliga Württemberg
  - Champions: (5) 1995, 2002, 2006, 2009, 2011

=== Cup ===
- Württemberg Cup
  - Winners: 1996

== Recent seasons ==
The recent season-by-season performance of the club:

Season	Division	Tier	Position
1999–2000	Oberliga Baden-Württemberg	IV	11th
2000–01	Oberliga Baden-Württemberg	IV	16th ↓
2001–02	Verbandsliga Württemberg	V	1st ↑
2002–03	Oberliga Baden-Württemberg	IV	9th
2003–04	Oberliga Baden-Württemberg	IV	8th
2004–05	Oberliga Baden-Württemberg	IV	15th ↓
2005–06	Verbandsliga Württemberg	V	1st ↑
2006–07	Oberliga Baden-Württemberg	IV	18th ↓
2007–08	Verbandsliga Württemberg	V	6th
2008–09	Verbandsliga Württemberg	VI	1st ↑
2009–10	Oberliga Baden-Württemberg	V	18th ↓
2010–11	Verbandsliga Württemberg	VI	1st ↑
2011–12	Oberliga Baden-Württemberg	V	17th ↓
2012–13	Verbandsliga Württemberg	VI	6th
2013–14	Verbandsliga Württemberg	VI	16th ↓
2014–15	Landesliga Württemberg 2	VII	3rd
2015–16	Landesliga Württemberg 2	VII	13th ↓
2016–17	Bezirksliga	VIII	

- With the introduction of the Regionalligas in 1994 and the 3. Liga in 2008 as the new third tier, below the 2. Bundesliga, all leagues below dropped one tier.

↑ Promoted	↓ Relegated

== Stadium ==
SV Bonlanden play their home matches in the Stadion an der Humboldtstraße which has a capacity of 2,000.
