= FC Nöttingen =

German football club

Coordinates: 48.926430352147285°N 8.572865547469478°E

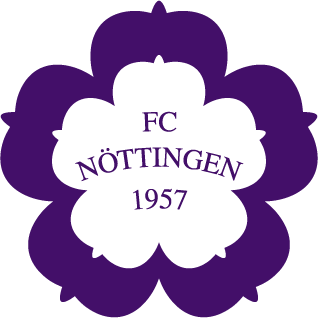
- Full name: Fußball Club Nöttingen 1957 e. V.
- Founded: 2 July 1957
- Ground: Kleiner Arena
- Capacity: 3,800
- Chairman: Dirk Steidl
- Manager: Dennis Will
- League: Oberliga Baden-Württemberg (V)
- 2025–26: Oberliga Baden-Württemberg, 3rd of 18
Home colours	Away colours	Third colours

FC Nöttingen is a German association football club from the Nöttingen district of Remchingen, Baden-Württemberg. The footballers are part of a sports club of more than 500 members that also has departments for table tennis and an unusual sport popular locally known as Schnürles or Fussballtennis (Football tennis), played with a soccer ball on a tennis court. The game was introduced to the area from Czechoslovakia in the 1920s by coach Fritz Schnürle. The stadium is the Kleiner Arena.

== History ==
Founded on 2 July 1957, FC acknowledges TSV Germania Nöttingen, established prior to World War I, as a predecessor side. Germania folded in 1927.

The modern day successor rose slowly and steadily, out of B-class football into A-class in 1969, on into the Bezirksliga Pforzheim in 1972, the Landesliga Mittelbaden in 1996, the Verbandsliga Nordbaden (V) in 1997, and the Oberliga Baden-Württemberg (IV) in 2002. On reaching the Regionalliga Süd (III) in 2004 FC stumbled and was relegated after finishing in last place. The club currently plays in the fifth tier Oberliga Baden-Württemberg as a lower table side.

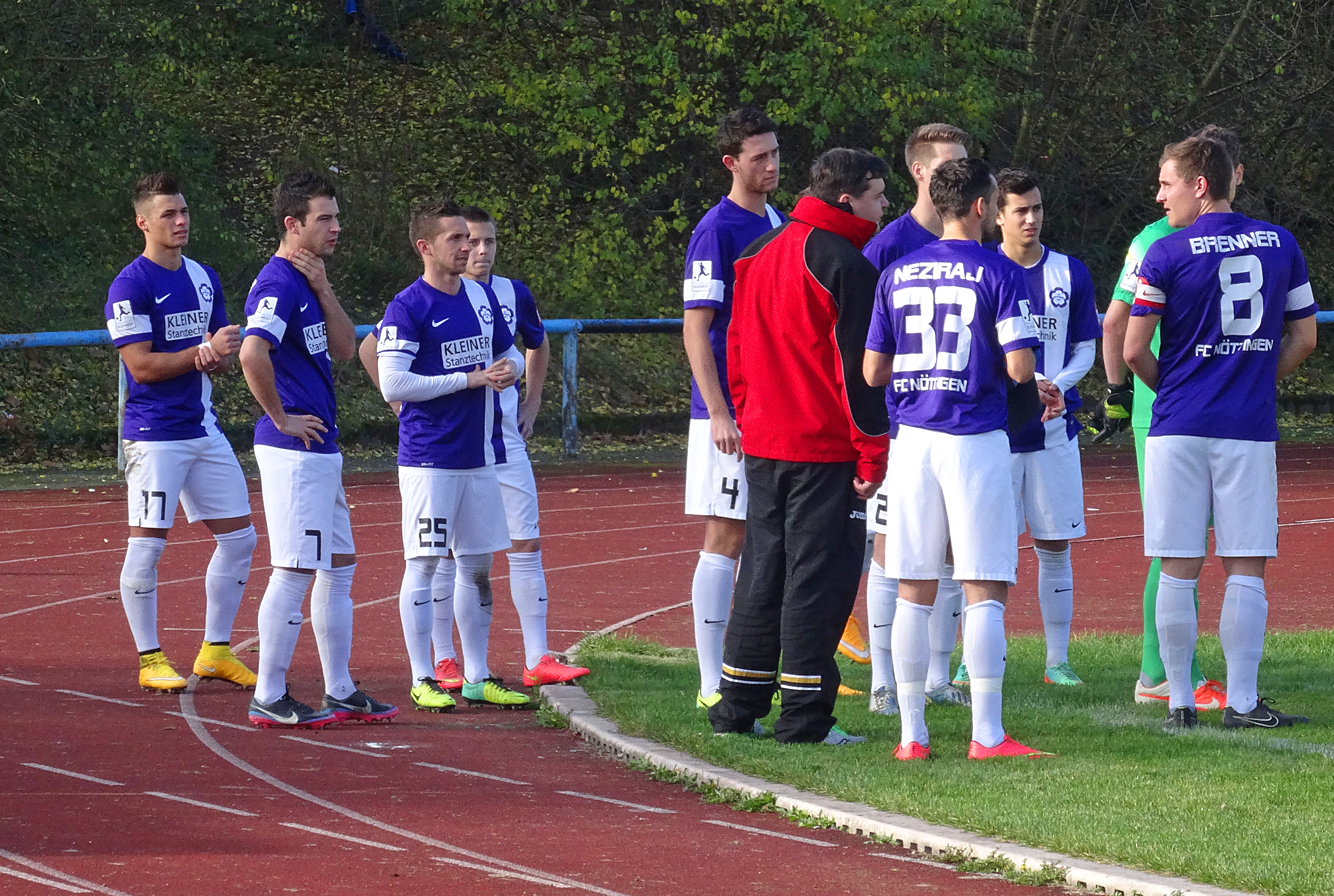
FC Nöttingen Players after a game

In 2010–11, the club lead the Oberliga for most of the season, but eventually missed out on the title and promotion to Waldhof Mannheim when it lost the last two games of the season. A third-place finish in the Oberliga qualified the club for the promotion play-offs to the Regionalliga Südwest, where it defeated FSV Salmrohr and earned promotion. After only one season in the Regionalliga the club was relegated to the Oberliga again in 2015. Finishing runners-up in the Oberliga in 2015–16 Nöttingen was once more promoted to the Regionalliga after a play-off after four-all draw with SC Hauenstein in the final match.

== Stadium ==
The FC Nöttingen is playing in Kleiner Arena. The stadium has a capacity for 3.800 spectators.

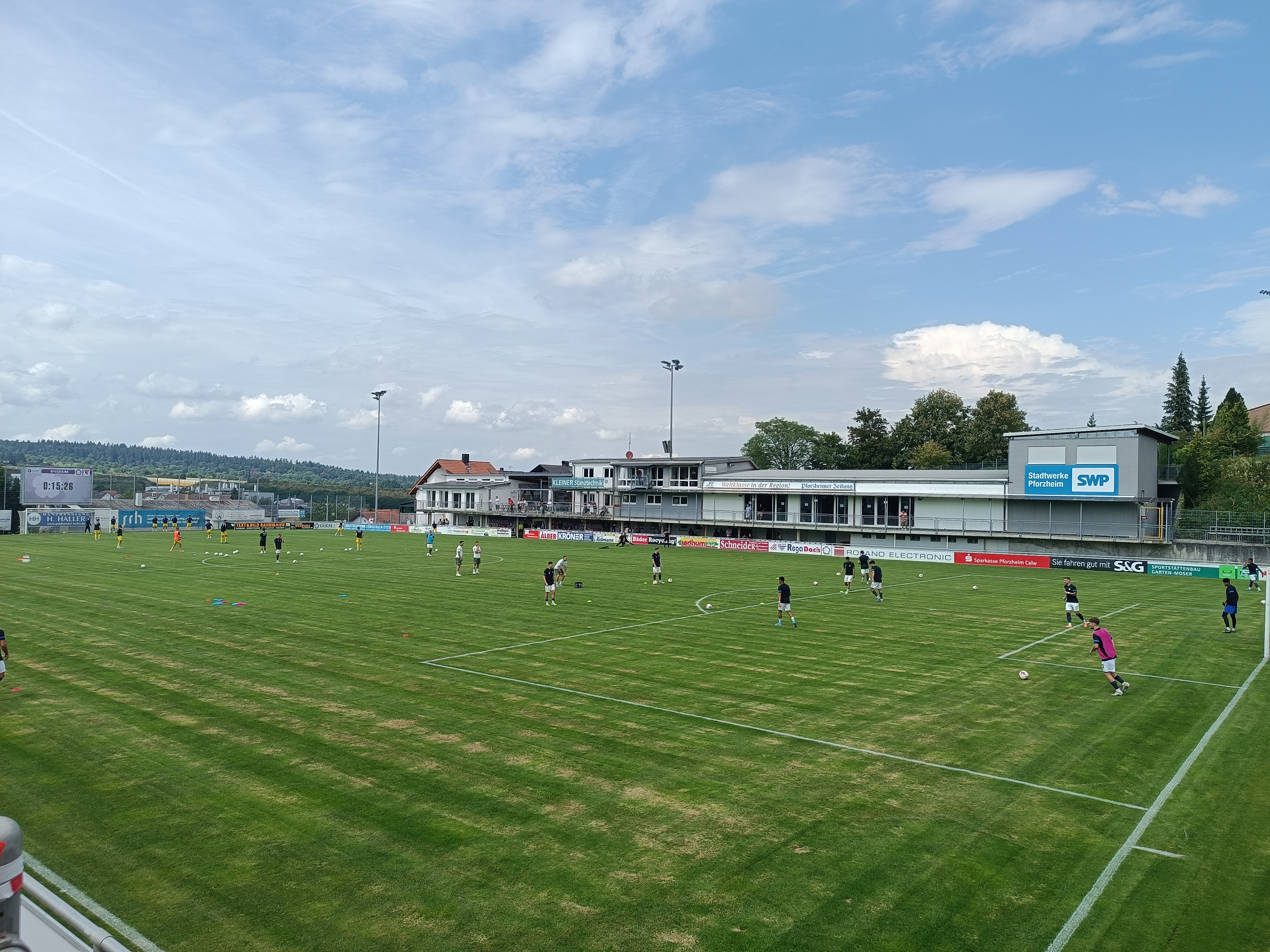

== Honours ==
The club's honours:

=== League ===
- Oberliga Baden-Württemberg
  - Champions: 2004
  - Runners-up: 2011, 2016
- Verbandsliga Nordbaden (V)
  - Champions: 2002
- Landesliga Mittelbaden (VI)
  - Champions: 1997
- Bezirksliga Pforzheim
  - Champions: 1979, 1982, 1986, 1996
- A-Klass Süd
  - Champions: 1972
- B-Klass Nord
  - Champions: 1969

=== Cup ===
- North Baden Cup
  - Winners: 2012, 2015, 2017
  - Runners-up: 2010, 2011, 2013, 2014, 2020

The club's second team also captured the Bezirksliga title in 2004.

== Recent managers ==
Recent managers of the club:

Manager	Start	Finish
Günther Cuntz	9 January 2006	30 June 2006
Rainer Ulrich	1 July 2006	31 December 2006
Gerd Doll	1 January 2007	30 June 2007
Michael Fuchs	1 July 2007	30 June 2010
Michael Wittwer	1 July 2010	13 April 2016
Gerd Dais	14 April 2016	2 July 2016
Dubravko Kolinger	3 July 2016	Present

== Recent seasons ==
The recent season-by-season performance of the club:

Season	Division	Tier	Position
1999–2000	Verbandsliga Nordbaden	V	12th
2000–01	Verbandsliga Nordbaden	V	6th
2001–02	Verbandsliga Nordbaden	V	1st ↑
2002–03	Oberliga Baden-Württemberg	IV	8th
2003–04	Oberliga Baden-Württemberg	IV	1st ↑
2004–05	Regionalliga Süd	III	18th ↓
2005–06	Oberliga Baden-Württemberg	IV	9th
2006–07	Oberliga Baden-Württemberg	IV	14th
2007–08	Oberliga Baden-Württemberg	IV	11th
2008–09	Oberliga Baden-Württemberg	V	5th
2009–10	Oberliga Baden-Württemberg	V	9th
2010–11	Oberliga Baden-Württemberg	V	2nd
2011–12	Oberliga Baden-Württemberg	V	6th
2012–13	Oberliga Baden-Württemberg	V	4th
2013–14	Oberliga Baden-Württemberg	V	3rd ↑
2014–15	Regionalliga Südwest	IV	15th ↓
2015–16	Oberliga Baden-Württemberg	V	2nd ↑
2016–17	Regionalliga Südwest	IV	18th ↓
2017–18	Oberliga Baden-Württemberg	V	5th
2018–19	Oberliga Baden-Württemberg	V	4th
2019–20	Oberliga Baden-Württemberg	V	12th
2020–21	Oberliga Baden-Württemberg	V	5th
2021–22	Oberliga Baden-Württemberg	V	7th
2022–23	Oberliga Baden-Württemberg	V	10th
2023–24	Oberliga Baden-Württemberg	V	5th
2024–25	Oberliga Baden-Württemberg	V	7th
2025–26	Oberliga Baden-Württemberg	V	3rd

- With the introduction of the Regionalligas in 1994 and the 3. Liga in 2008 as the new third tier, below the 2. Bundesliga, all leagues below dropped one tier.

↑ Promoted	↓ Relegated
