= TSV Grunbach =

German football club

- Full name: Turn- und Sportverein Grunbach e.V.
- Founded: 1892
- Ground: Eichbergstadion
- Capacity: 2,000
- Chairman: vacant
- Manager: Benjamin Krause
- League: Kreisliga Pforzheim (VIII)
- 2025–26: Kreisliga Pforzheim, 8th of 17
Home colours	Away colours

TSV Grunbach is a German association football club from the town of Engelsbrand, Baden-Württemberg. The club's greatest success has been promotion to the tier five Oberliga Baden-Württemberg in 2012 but it withdrew from the league after only two seasons in 2014 despite finishing runners-up.

== History ==
Formed in 1892 TSV Grunbach has played in local amateur football for the most part of its history. The club's rise through the league system began in 2008 with a championship in the Kreisklasse A2 Pforzheim. Three consecutive league titles from 2010 to 2012 took the club from the Kreisliga to the Oberliga Baden-Württemberg. In this league the club came thirteenth in its first season, followed by a runners-up finish in 2013–14. The latter would have allowed the club to participate in the promotion round to the Regionalliga Südwest but it declined because of the large expenses involved in modifying the stadium to Refionalliga standards. After merger talks with Verbandsliga club 1. CfR Pforzheim fell through and a cooperation was agreed on instead TSV Grunbach withdrew to the tier eight Kreisliga Pforzheim instead with a number of players being transferred from TSV to 1. CfR.

== Honours ==
The club's honours:

- Oberliga Baden-Württemberg
  - Champions: 2014
- Verbandsliga Baden
  - Champions: 2012
- Landesliga Mittelbaden
  - Champions: 2011
- Kreisliga Pforzheim
  - Champions: 2010
- Kreisklasse A2 Pforzheim
  - Champions: 2008

== Recent seasons ==
The recent season-by-season performance of the club:

Season	Division	Tier	Position
2004–05	Kreisklasse A2 Pforzheim	VIII	9th
2005–06	Kreisklasse A2 Pforzheim	VIII	5th
2006–07	Kreisklasse A2 Pforzheim	VIII	3rd
2007–08	Kreisklasse A2 Pforzheim	VIII	1st↑
2008–09	Kreisliga Pforzheim	VIII	9th
2009–10	Kreisliga Pforzheim	VIII	1st↑
2010–11	Landesliga Mittelbaden	VII	1st↑
2011–12	Verbandsliga Baden	VI	1st↑
2012–13	Oberliga Baden-Württemberg	V	13th
2013–14	Oberliga Baden-Württemberg	V	2nd (withdrawn)
2014–15	Kreisliga Pforzheim	VIII	13th
2015–16	Kreisliga Pforzheim	VIII	13th
2016–17	Kreisliga Pforzheim	VIII	

- With the introduction of the Regionalligas in 1994 and the 3. Liga in 2008 as the new third tier, below the 2. Bundesliga, all leagues below dropped one tier.

↑ Promoted	↓ Relegated
