= FSV 08 Bissingen =

German football club

FSV 08 Bietigheim-Bissingen
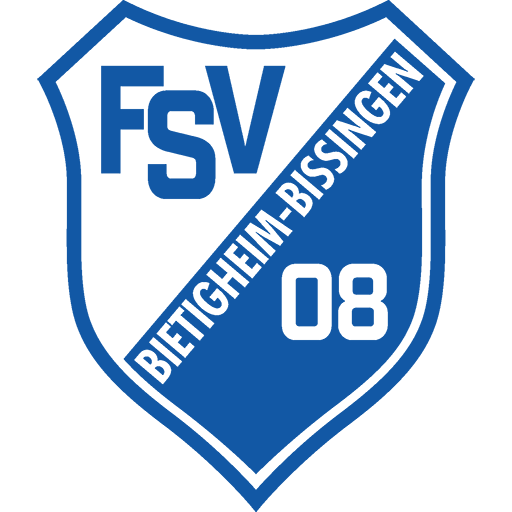
- Full name: FSV 08 Bietigheim-Bissingen e.V.
- Nickname: 1. NullAchtEinTEam
- Founded: 1908
- Ground: Sportgelände am Bruchwald
- Capacity: 3,000
- Chairman: Rolf Knorr; Kevin Paulick; Francesco Di Costanzo
- Manager: Haris Krak
- League: Verbandsliga Württemberg (VI)
- 2025–26: Oberliga Baden-Württemberg (V), 17th of 18 (relegated)
Home colours	Away colours

FSV 08 Bietigheim-Bissingen is a German association football club from the town of Bietigheim-Bissingen, Baden-Württemberg. The club plays in the tier five Oberliga Baden-Württemberg.

== History ==
The club was formed in 1908 as Fußballclub Viktoria Bissingen. In 1919 the club merged with Sportvereinigung Bissingen but the new club was outlawed by the Nazis in 1934. The football department joined TV Bissingen after that but the latter was dissolved during the Second World War. The club reformed after the war and, in 1950, the football department left to form the current club, FSV 08 Bissingen. The club climbed as high as the tier four 2. Amateurliga in the 1950s but then disappeared into local amateur football for the next decades. FSV started its rise through the league system in 2000 when it won promotion to the Bezirksliga, followed by promotion to the Landesliga four years later. In the same season, 2003–04 it also made a losing appearance in the Württemberg Cup final against VfR Aalen. The club won promotion to the Verbandsliga Württemberg in 2006 and finished runners-up in this league in 2009. In the promotion round to the Oberliga it lost to TSG Weinheim but met the same club again three years later in its second attempt at Oberliga promotion. Successful on this occasion, FSV played in the Oberliga Baden-Württemberg in 2012–13 but finished second-last and was relegated again. The club played two more seasons in the Verbandsliga until it won the league for the first time and another promotion in 2015.

== Honours ==
The club's honours:

- Verbandsliga Württemberg
  - Champions: 2015
  - Runners-up: 2009, 2012
- Landesliga Württemberg I
  - Champions: 2006

== Recent seasons ==
The recent season-by-season performance of the club:

Season	Division	Tier	Position
2004–05	Landesliga Württemberg I	VI	2nd
2005–06	Landesliga Württemberg I	VI	1st ↑
2006–07	Verbandsliga Württemberg	V	11th
2007–08	Verbandsliga Württemberg	V	11th
2008–09	Verbandsliga Württemberg	VI	2nd
2009–10	Verbandsliga Württemberg	VI	6th
2010–11	Verbandsliga Württemberg	VI	3rd
2011–12	Verbandsliga Württemberg	VI	2nd ↑
2012–13	Oberliga Baden-Württemberg	V	17th ↓
2013–14	Verbandsliga Württemberg	VI	3rd
2014–15	Verbandsliga Württemberg	VI	1st ↑
2015–16	Oberliga Baden-Württemberg	V	3rd
2016–17	Oberliga Baden-Württemberg	V	2nd
2017–18	Oberliga Baden-Württemberg	V	4th
2018–19	Oberliga Baden-Württemberg	V	3rd

- With the introduction of the Regionalligas in 1994 and the 3. Liga in 2008 as the new third tier, below the 2. Bundesliga, all leagues below dropped one tier.

↑ Promoted	↓ Relegated
