= FSV Hollenbach =

German football club

- Full name: Fußballsportverein Hollenbach 1970 e.V.
- Founded: 1970
- Ground: Sportplatz im Greut
- Capacity: 1,000
- Chairman: Karlheinz Weidmann
- Manager: Reinhard Schenker
- League: Verbandsliga Württemberg (VI)
- 2025–26: Oberliga Baden-Württemberg (V), 16th of 18 (relegated)
Home colours	Away colours

FSV Hollenbach is a German association football club from district of Hollenbach in Mulfingen, Baden-Württemberg. The team was founded in 1970 and first came to attention when the support of local sports clothing manufacturer Jako helped them win promotion to the Verbandsliga Württemberg (VI) in 2007. After fifth and third-place results over the next two seasons, FSV captured the division title and advanced to the Oberliga Baden-Württemberg (V).

== Honours ==
The club's honours:

- Verbandsliga Württemberg (VI)
  - Champions: 2010
- Landesliga Württemberg I (VI)
  - Champions: 2007
- Bezirksliga Hohenlohe (VII)
  - Champions: 2000

== Recent seasons ==
The recent season-by-season performance of the club:

Season	Division	Tier	Position
1999–2000	Bezirksliga Hohenlohe	VII	1st ↑
2000–01			
2001–02			
2002–03			
2003–04	Landesliga Württemberg I	VI	12th
2004–05	Landesliga Württemberg I	VI	3rd
2005–06	Landesliga Württemberg I	VI	8th
2006–07	Landesliga Württemberg I	VI	1st ↑
2007–08	Verbandsliga Württemberg	V	5th
2008–09	Verbandsliga Württemberg	VI	3rd
2009–10	Verbandsliga Württemberg	VI	1st ↑
2010–11	Oberliga Baden-Württemberg	V	12th
2011–12	Oberliga Baden-Württemberg	V	9th
2012–13	Oberliga Baden-Württemberg	V	9th
2013–14	Oberliga Baden-Württemberg	V	8th
2014–15	Oberliga Baden-Württemberg	V	8th
2015–16	Oberliga Baden-Württemberg	V	6th
2016–17	Oberliga Baden-Württemberg	V	

- With the introduction of the Regionalligas in 1994 and the 3. Liga in 2008 as the new third tier, below the 2. Bundesliga, all leagues below dropped one tier.

↑ Promoted	↓ Relegated
