= SV Spielberg =

German football club

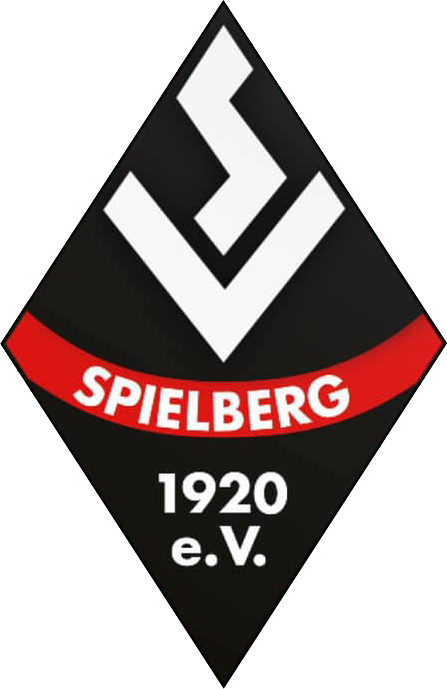
- Full name: Sport Verein Spielberg e.V.
- Founded: 1920
- Chairman: Werner Ungerer
- Manager: Hartmut Kaufmann
- League: Oberliga Baden-Württemberg (V)
- 2017–18: 14th
- Website: http://www.sv-spielberg1920.de/
Home colours	Away colours

The SV Spielberg is a German association football club from the suburb of Spielberg, Karlsbad, Baden-Württemberg. In 2014–15, the club had its most successful season ever, earning promotion to the tier-four Regionalliga Südwest after a league title in the Oberliga Baden-Württemberg.

== History ==
The club was formed in 1920. For the first forty years of the club's history, it remained a local amateur side. From 1933 to 1945, the club, with its working-class background, was outlawed.

In 1959, the SVS won a championship in the local A-Klasse, but it took until 1970 for the side to reach the tier-four 2nd Amateurliga Mittelbaden-Group 2. Spielberg showed some decent performances at this level in the following season, finishing fifth in its first year.

In 1975, the club made its first, and so far only, participation in the German Cup. In a first-round game at fellow amateur side Eintracht Höhr-Grenzhausen, the club lost 4–3. The team also had a good league season, finishing third in the 2nd Amateurliga. The following season, the club was moved to Group 2 of the league and fell only one point short of promotion, coming second. This performance was however enough to qualify for the new Landesligas which replaced the 2nd Amateurligas at this level.

Spielberg had another good season in Group 3 of this league in 1978–79, finishing third, followed by a second place a year later. After this, the club's performances notably declined and it was relegated in 1983 after finishing last in its league. In the 1980s, the club's youth program produced a future German international, Jens Nowotny.

By 1987, the SVS managed to return to the Landesliga and earned promotion to the Verbandsliga Nordbaden for the first time in 1994.

The club remained a member of this league for the next fifteen seasons, with two third places in 1999 and 2005 as the highlights. It managed to finish in the upper half of the table every season except 2001 and 2002 when it came twelfth in both years.

In the 2008–09 season, a championship in the Verbandsliga earned the club promotion to the highest league in the state of Baden-Württemberg, the Oberliga Baden-Württemberg, for the first time. The club was relegated after just one season, but then managed to be promoted again in the subsequent season, and was playing in the Oberliga again from 2011. After three difficult seasons in which the club struggled against relegation it won the league in 2014–15 and earned promotion to the tier four Regionalliga Südwest for the first time but lasted for only one season before being relegated again.

== Honours ==
The club's honours:

- Oberliga Baden-Württemberg
  - Champions: 2015
- Verbandsliga Nordbaden (VI)
  - Champions: (2) 2009, 2011

== Recent managers ==
Recent managers of the club:

Manager	Start	Finish
Martin Fleck	?	Present

== Recent seasons ==
The recent season-by-season performance of the club:

Season	Division	Tier	Position
1999–2000	Verbandsliga Nordbaden	V	9th
2000–01	Verbandsliga Nordbaden	V	12th
2001–02	Verbandsliga Nordbaden	V	12th
2002–03	Verbandsliga Nordbaden	V	6th
2003–04	Verbandsliga Nordbaden	V	9th
2004–05	Verbandsliga Nordbaden	V	3rd
2005–06	Verbandsliga Nordbaden	V	4th
2006–07	Verbandsliga Nordbaden	V	7th
2007–08	Verbandsliga Nordbaden	V	6th
2008–09	Verbandsliga Nordbaden	VI	1st ↑
2009–10	Oberliga Baden-Württemberg	V	15th ↓
2010–11	Verbandsliga Nordbaden	VI	1st ↑
2011–12	Oberliga Baden-Württemberg	V	14th
2012–13	Oberliga Baden-Württemberg	V	15th
2013–14	Oberliga Baden-Württemberg	V	16th
2014–15	Oberliga Baden-Württemberg	V	1st ↑
2015–16	Regionalliga Südwest	IV	16th ↓
2016–17	Oberliga Baden-Württemberg	V	10th
2017–18	Oberliga Baden-Württemberg	V	14th

- With the introduction of the Regionalligas in 1994 and the 3. Liga in 2008 as the new third tier, below the 2. Bundesliga, all leagues below dropped one tier.

=== Key ===
↑ Promoted	↓ Relegated
