= Oberliga Baden-Württemberg =

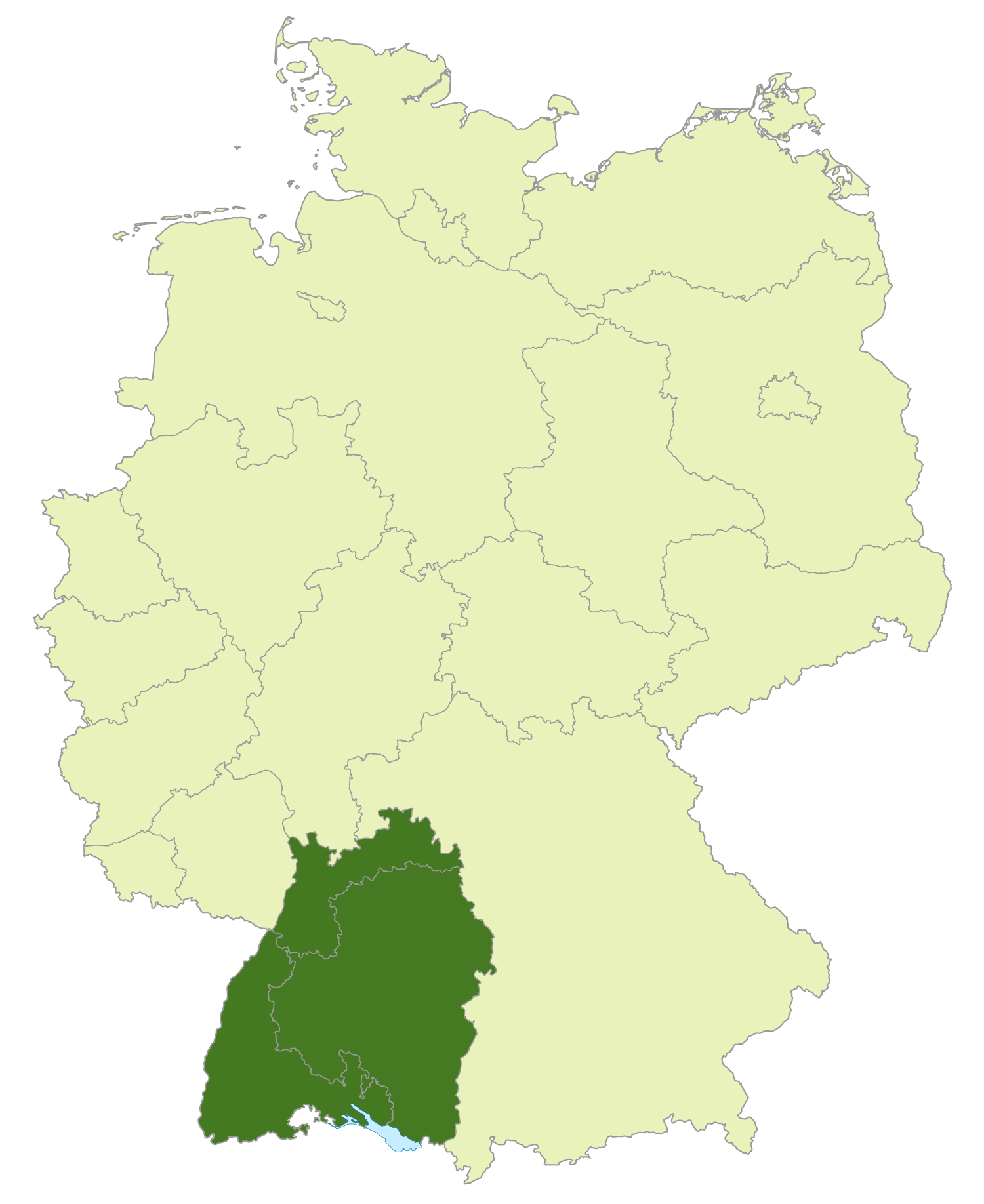
- Organising bodies: Baden Football Association; South Baden Football Association; Württemberg Football Association
- Founded: 1978
- Country: Germany
- State: Baden-Württemberg
- Number of clubs: 18
- Level on pyramid: Level 5
- Promotion to: Regionalliga Südwest
- Relegation to: Verbandsliga Nordbaden; Verbandsliga Südbaden; Verbandsliga Württemberg
- Domestic cups: Badischer Pokal; Südbadischer Pokal; Württembergischer Pokal
- Current champions: VfR Aalen (2025–26)
- Current: 2026-27 Oberliga Baden-Württemberg

The Oberliga Baden-Württemberg is the highest association football league in the state of Baden-Württemberg and the Baden-Württemberg football league system. It is one of fourteen Oberligas in German football, the fifth tier of the German football league system. Until the introduction of the 3. Liga in 2008 it was the fourth tier of the league system, and until the introduction of the Regionalligas in 1994 the third tier.

== Overview ==
The league was formed in 1978 as the highest level of play in the state. Previous to that, the four Amateurligas Nordwürttemberg, Schwarzwald-Bodensee, Südbaden and Nordbaden formed the tier right below the 2nd Bundesliga. The Amateurligas changed their name since into Verbandsliga. The Amateurligas Nordwürttemberg and Schwarzwald-Bodensee merged to form the Verbandsliga Württemberg. The three Verbandsliga's now feed the Oberliga Baden-Württemberg.

Until 1994, the winners of the Oberligas had to play-off for the four promotion spots to the 2nd Bundesliga with the other Oberliga winners.

In 1994, the Regionalliga Süd was introduced, and the Oberliga Baden-Württemberg is automatically promoted to this league. In the inaugural season, five clubs from Baden-Württemberg were qualified for the new league, based on their performance over the last three seasons, these clubs being:

- SSV Ulm 1846
- SSV Reutlingen
- VfR Mannheim
- TSF Ditzingen
- SpVgg Ludwigsburg

Originally, a sixth place for the Oberliga was available but because the Stuttgarter Kickers, a club from Württemberg, was relegated from the 2nd Bundesliga that year, the club took up this spot.

After the reduction of the number of Regionalligas from four to two in 2000, the Oberliga Baden-Württemberg still remained below the Regionalliga Süd, but this reduction meant that the Oberliga champions in that year were not promoted.

With the changes in the league system in 2008, there was four clubs from the Oberliga Baden-Württemberg promoted to Regionalliga Süd after the 2007–08 season, nominally the top four teams, however, there was also financial requirements to receive a Regionalliga license. The four clubs were:

- SC Freiburg II
- SSV Ulm 1846
- Waldhof Mannheim
- 1. FC Heidenheim 1846

The winners of the three Verbandsligas gain automatic promotion to the Oberliga. The runners-up of North Baden then plays the runners-up of South Baden in a home-and-away series. The winner of this games faces the runners-up of Württemberg for the final Oberliga spot.

Feeder Leagues to the Oberliga Baden-Württemberg

- Verbandsliga Württemberg
- Verbandsliga Baden
- Verbandsliga Südbaden

In the past two clubs which played in the Oberliga Baden-Württemberg were not based in the state. TSV Amicitia Viernheim (Hesse) and SpVgg Au/Iller (Bavaria) both were in the Oberliga for a number of years.

The separation of Nordbaden and Südbaden is not traditional. It results from the end of World War II when North Baden was in the American occupation zone and South Baden in the French. Inter zone travel was difficult then and two separate leagues developed. Until 1950 the clubs from the South Baden and the Schwarzwald-Bodensee regions actually played in the southwest league system, the old (1945–1963) Oberliga Südwest, only after that were they integrated into the southern league system, where they geographically belonged.

For the 2012–13 season, the Regionalliga Süd was disbanded, and the Oberliga Baden-Württemberg became a feeder league to the new Regionalliga Südwest, together with the Hessenliga and the Oberliga Rheinland-Pfalz/Saar.

== League champions ==
The league champions since 1979:

Season	Club
1978–79	SSV Ulm 1846
1979–80	VfB Stuttgart II
1980–81	SV Sandhausen
1981–82	SSV Ulm 1846
1982–83	SSV Ulm 1846
1983–84	Freiburger FC
1984–85	SV Sandhausen
1985–86	SSV Ulm 1846
1986–87	SV Sandhausen
1987–88	FV 09 Weinheim
1988–89	SSV Reutlingen
1989–90	Karlsruher SC II
1990–91	1. FC Pforzheim
1991–92	SSV Reutlingen
1992–93	SSV Ulm 1846
1993–94	SSV Ulm 1846
1994–95	SV Sandhausen
1995–96	Karlsruher SC II
1996–97	VfL Kirchheim/Teck
1997–98	VfB Stuttgart II
1998–99	VfR Aalen
1999–00	SV Sandhausen
2000–01	TSG 1899 Hoffenheim

Season	Club
2001–02	SC Pfullendorf
2002–03	VfB Stuttgart II
2003–04	FC Nöttingen
2004–05	Karlsruher SC II
2005–06	SSV Reutlingen
2006–07	SV Sandhausen
2007–08	SC Freiburg II
2008–09	SG Sonnenhof Großaspach
2009–10	1899 Hoffenheim II
2010–11	Waldhof Mannheim
2011–12	SSV Ulm 1846
2012–13	SpVgg Neckarelz
2013–14	FC Astoria Walldorf
2014–15	SV Spielberg
2015–16	SSV Ulm 1846
2016–17	SC Freiburg II
2017–18	TSG Balingen
2018–19	Bahlinger SC
2019–20	VfB Stuttgart II
2020–21	None
2021–22	SGV Freiberg
2022–23	Stuttgarter Kickers
2023–24	FC 08 Villingen
2024–25	Sonnenhof Großaspach
2025–26	VfR Aalen

Source:"Oberliga B/W". Das deutsche Fussball-Archiv.

- In 2014, the third-placed team FC Nöttingen was also promoted after a play-off.
- In 2016, the runners-up Bahlinger SC were also promoted after a play-off.
- In 2016, the runners-up FC Nöttingen were also promoted after a play-off.
- In 2021, the competition was abandoned because of the COVID-19 pandemic.
- In 2025, the runners-up TSG Balingen were also promoted after a play-off.

== Founding members of the league ==
The Oberliga started in 1978 with 20 clubs from four regions.

From the Amateurliga Nordwürttemberg:

- SSV Ulm 1846
- 1. Göppinger SV
- SpVgg Ludwigsburg
- FC Eislingen
- SB Heidenheim

From the Amateurliga Schwarzwald-Bodensee:

- SSV Reutlingen
- FV Biberach
- FC Tailfingen
- FV Ravensburg
- VfB Friedrichshafen

From the Amateurliga Nordbaden:

- FV Weinheim 09
- SV Sandhausen
- 1. FC Pforzheim
- VfR Mannheim
- SV Neckargerach

From the Amateurliga Südbaden:

- FC Rastatt 04
- FC 08 Villingen
- SV Kuppenheim
- DJK Konstanz
- Offenburger FV

== League placings ==
Club	13	14	15	16	17	18	19	20	21	22	23	24	25
SSV Ulm 1846	R	R	5	1	R	R	R	R	R	R	R	3L	2B
VfB Stuttgart II	3L	3L	3L	3L	R	R	R	1	R	R	R	R	3L
SC Freiburg II	R	R	R	R	1	R	R	R	R	3L	3L	3L	R
Astoria Walldorf	2	1	R	R	R	R	R	R	R	R	R	R	R
Bahlinger SC	6	14	2	R	5	9	1	R	R	R	R	R	R
SGV Freiberg	5	4	3	15		3	7	16	1	1	R	R	R
Stuttgarter Kickers	3L	3L	3L	3L	R	R	2	3	2	2	1	R	R
FC 08 Villingen	11	6	16	16		2	8	5	10	4	11	1	R
1. Göppinger SV					7	8	5	2	3	6	4	2	R
Sonnenhof Großaspach	R	R	3L	3L	3L	3L	3L	3L	R	R	2	3	1
TSG Balingen	10	13	4	8	4	1	R	R	R	R	R	R	2
VfR Mannheim	3	15	17									9	3
VfR Aalen	2B	2B	2B	3L	3L	3L	3L	R	R	R	R	R	4
1. CfR Pforzheim				5	8	13	11	13	11	5	3	4	5
SV Oberachern		18		7	13	11	14	6	17	13	6	10	6
FC Nöttingen	4	3	R	2	R	5	4	12	5	7	10	5	7
TSG Backnang 1919						12	15		12	3	13	11	8
SSV Reutlingen	7	7	9	11	9	7	9	14	13	9	14	15	9
TSV Essingen												8	10
FSV Hollenbach	9	8	8	6	16						8	6	11
Normannia Gmünd							17					7	12
FSV 08 Bietigheim-Bissingen	17			3	2	4	3	7	4	10	9	14	13
FV Ravensburg		9	7	9	6	6	6	4	8	8	15	13	14
SV Fellbach													15
FC Zuzenhausen													16
Calcio Leinfelden-Echterdingen													17
FC 08 Villingen II													18
ATSV Mutschelbach											5	12	
FC Holzhausen											7	16	
FC Denzlingen												17	
Offenburger FV	16				17						12	18	
1. FC Rielasingen-Arlen								11	6	11	16		
Neckarsulmer SU					3	10	10	15	7	12	17		
Freiburger FC			15	13				8	20	14	18		
Spfr. Dorfmerkingen								9	9	15			
Astoria Walldorf II					15	17			19	16			
SV Linx							12	10	16	17			
1. FC Bruchsal		17							14	18			
TSV Ilshofen							13	17	15	19			
FV Lörrach-Brombach									18	20			
SV Sandhausen II				10	11	16		18	21				
Germania Friedrichstal			12	17			16						
SV Spielberg	15	16	1	R	10	14	18						
Karlsruher SC II	12	5	6	4	12	15							
TSG Weinheim						18							
Stuttgarter Kickers II	14	10	14	12	14								
SpVgg Neckarelz	1	R	R	R	18								
Kehler FV	8	11	10	14									
SC Pfullendorf	R	R	11	18									
VfR Aalen II			13										
Kickers Pforzheim			18										
TSV Grunbach	13	2											
1. FC Heidenheim II		12											
FC Singen 04	18												

=== Key ===
Symbol	Key
B	Bundesliga
2B	2. Bundesliga
3L	3. Liga
R	Regionalliga Süd (1994–2012) Regionalliga Südwest (2012–present)
1	League champions
Place	League
Blank	Played at a league level below this league
