= Karlsruher SC II =

- Full name: Karlsruher Sport-Club; Mühlburg-Phönix e. V.
- Founded: 6 June 1894 (club)
- Ground: Wildparkstadion – Platz 2
- Capacity: 5,000
- Chairman: Ingo Wellenreuther
- Manager: Dietmar Blicker
- League: Oberliga Baden-Württemberg (V)
- 2025–26: Oberliga Baden-Württemberg, 10th of 18
| Home colours | Away colours |

Karlsruher SC II is the reserve team of German association football club Karlsruher SC, based in Karlsruhe, Baden-Württemberg. Historically the team has played as Karlsruher SC Amateure until 2005.

The team has reached the first round of the DFB-Pokal, the German Cup, on four occasions, advancing to the third round in 1996–97 as its best-ever result. The team has played as high as the Regionalliga, courtesy to league titles in the Oberliga Baden-Württemberg, the highest football league in the state.

== History ==
Karlsruher SC Amateure first made an appearance in the highest league of northern Baden when it won promotion to the tier three Amateurliga Nordbaden in 1961. After two lower table results the team finished runners-up in 1964 and won the league the season after. The team continued to generally achieve good results in the league but came only ninth in 1977–78 when a top five finish was required to qualify for the new Oberliga Baden-Württemberg and instead had to enter new the tier four Verbandsliga Nordbaden.

KSC Amateure finished only fifteenth in the Verbandsliga in 1979 and dropped down to the Landesliga for two seasons before returning in 1981. Between 1981and 1994 the team moved up and down between the Verbandsliga and Oberliga, earning promotion to the later in 1983, 1989 and 1994 but also being relegated again in 1985 and 1993. In between, in 1989–90, the team took out an Oberliga title but was ineligible for promotion to the 2. Bundesliga. In this era it also won the North Baden Cup on two occasions, in 1991 and 1994 and thereby advanced to the first round of the German Cup. On the first occasion it advanced to the second round where it lost to Freiburger FC while, in 1994–95, it lost to SG Wattenscheid 09 in the first round.

The team entered a more successful era from 1994 onwards, now fluctuating between the Oberliga and the newly established Regionalliga Süd. KSC Amateure won the Oberliga for a second time in 1996 and earned promotion to the Regionalliga Süd, where it played for the next four seasons as a mid-table side. The team qualified for the DFB-Pokal for a third time for 1996–97 and experienced its greatest success in the competition that season when it reached the third round where it was knocked out by VfL Bochum. Despite a twelfth-place finish in 1999–2000 the team had to drop down from the Regionalliga to the Oberliga because the senior team was relegated from the 2. Bundesliga for the first time. KSC II qualified for the German Cup for the fourth and last time but was knocked out by Alemannia Aachen. Playing in the Oberliga as Karlsruher SC II while the senior side won the Regionalliga and returned to professional football the team took three seasons to recover before becoming a top side in the Oberliga again.

In 2004–05, the last season it played as Karlsruher SC Amateure, the team won a third Oberliga championship and made a return to the Regionalliga Süd and played at this level for the next seven seasons until the league was disbanded in 2012. The first four seasons proved difficult for the team at this level, struggling against relegation but results greatly improved from 2009 onwards when the team earned two fifth-place finishes. Despite the fifth place in 2012 KSC II could not enter the new Regionalliga Südwest because the senior team had been relegated to the 3. Liga and reserve teams of 3. Liga clubs could not play higher than the Oberliga.

From 2012 to 2018, Karlsruher SC II competed in the Oberliga Baden-Württemberg, becoming eligible for promotion back to the Regionalliga after the senior team's return to the 2. Bundesliga. In March 2018, the club decided to discontinue its reserve team for economic reasons.

Following an initiative by supporters, Karlsruher SC reintroduced its second team for the 2019–20 season as a fan-run side, entering the Kreisklasse C, the lowest tier of league football in North Baden.

In November 2023, the club announced the official reinstatement of an under-23 team for the 2024–25 season, following approval by the Baden Football Association. The re-established reserve side was designated as the highest team within the club's academy structure, intended to bridge the gap between youth football and the professional squad, and entered the Verbandsliga Baden for the 2024–25 campaign. In its first season after reinstatement, Karlsruher SC II won the Verbandsliga Nordbaden and secured promotion to the Oberliga Baden-Württemberg for the following season.

== Current squad ==
As of 8 September 2026

Note: Flags indicate national team as defined under FIFA eligibility rules; some limited exceptions apply. Players may hold more than one non-FIFA nationality.

| No. | Pos. | Nation | Player |
|---|---|---|---|
| 3 | DF | GER | Joshua Geyer |
| 4 | DF | GER | Marlon Dinger |
| 5 | DF | TUN | Jassin Manai |
| 6 | MF | GER | Vasco Walz |
| 7 | MF | GER | Sidiky Zügel |
| 8 | MF | GER | Luis Dettling |
| 9 | FW | GER | Nico Engel |
| 10 | FW | GER | Devin Sür |
| 11 | FW | GER | Mathias Fetsch |
| 16 | DF | GER | Houssam Arbai |

| No. | Pos. | Nation | Player |
|---|---|---|---|
| 17 | DF | GER | Kimberly Ezekwem |
| 18 | FW | GER | Eymen Laghrissi |
| 19 | FW | GER | Tim Schunk |
| 20 | MF | GER | Niklas Behr |
| 22 | GK | GER | Kamil Günes |
| 23 | MF | GER | Bassem El-Dor |
| 24 | DF | GER | Sladan Puseljic |
| 26 | DF | GER | Louis Schmidt |
| 27 | FW | GER | Julian Gerold |
| 29 | GK | MAR | Soufiane Hikmat |

== Honours ==
The club's honours:

=== League ===
- Oberliga Baden-Württemberg
  - Champions: (3) 1990, 1996, 2005
- Verbandsliga Nordbaden (IV-V)
  - Champions: (4) 1983, 1989, 1994, 2025
- Amateurliga Nordbaden (III)
  - Champions: 1965
  - Runners-up: (2) 1964, 1967

=== Cup ===
- DFB-Pokal
  - Participation: 1991–92, 1994–95, 1996–97, 2000–01
- North Baden Cup
  - Winners: (4) 1991, 1994, 1996, 2000

== Recent seasons ==
The recent season-by-season performance of the club:

| Season | Division | Tier | Position |
| 1999–2000 | Regionalliga Süd | III | 12th (demoted) |
| 2000–01 | Oberliga Baden-Württemberg | IV | 8th |
| 2001–02 | Oberliga Baden-Württemberg | IV | 11th |
| 2002–03 | Oberliga Baden-Württemberg | IV | 15th |
| 2003–04 | Oberliga Baden-Württemberg | IV | 4th |
| 2004–05 | Oberliga Baden-Württemberg | IV | 1st↑ |
| 2005–06 | Regionalliga Süd | III | 11th |
| 2006–07 | Regionalliga Süd | III | 14th |
| 2007–08 (Note: With the introduction of the Regionalligas in 1994 and the 3. Liga in 2008 as the new third tier, below the 2. Bundesliga, all leagues below dropped one tier.) | Regionalliga Süd | III | 16th |
| 2008–09 | Regionalliga Süd | IV | 16th |
| 2009–10 | Regionalliga Süd | IV | 10th |
| 2010–11 | Regionalliga Süd | IV | 10th |
| 2011–12 | Regionalliga Süd | IV | 5th (demoted) |
| 2012–13 | Oberliga Baden-Württemberg | V | 12th |
| 2013–14 | Oberliga Baden-Württemberg | V | 5th |
| 2014–15 | Oberliga Baden-Württemberg | V | 6th |
| 2015–16 | Oberliga Baden-Württemberg | V | 4th |
| 2016–17 | Oberliga Baden-Württemberg | V | 12th |
| 2017–18 | Oberliga Baden-Württemberg | V | 15th (folded) |
| 2018–19 | defunct | | |
| 2019–20 | Kreisklasse A Karlsruhe 2 | XI | 7th |
| 2020–21 (Note: Season abandoned due to the COVID-19 pandemic.) | Kreisklasse C Karlsruhe 3 | XI | 1st |
| 2021–22 | Kreisklasse C Karlsruhe 1 | XI | 1st↑ |
| 2022–23 | Kreisklasse B Karlsruhe 2 | X | 2nd |
| 2023–24 | Kreisklasse B Karlsruhe 2 | X | 1st↑ |
| 2024–25 (Note: Karlsruher SC reintroduced its U23 team for the 2024–25 season after receiving approval from the Baden Football Association in November 2023. The newly formed Karlsruher SC II competed in the Verbandsliga Nordbaden and serves as the highest-level team within the club's academy structure, with the existing reserve side redesignated as the third team.) | Verbandsliga Nordbaden | VI | 1st↑ |
| 2025–26 | Oberliga Baden-Württemberg | V | 10th |

=== Key ===
| ↑ Promoted | ↓ Relegated |
