= Friedrichstal (Stutensee) =

Part of Stutensee in the district of Karlsruhe in Baden-Wuerttemberg Germany

Friedrichstal is a part of Stutensee in the district of Karlsruhe in Baden-Wuerttemberg, Germany.

Coat of arms of Friedrichstal

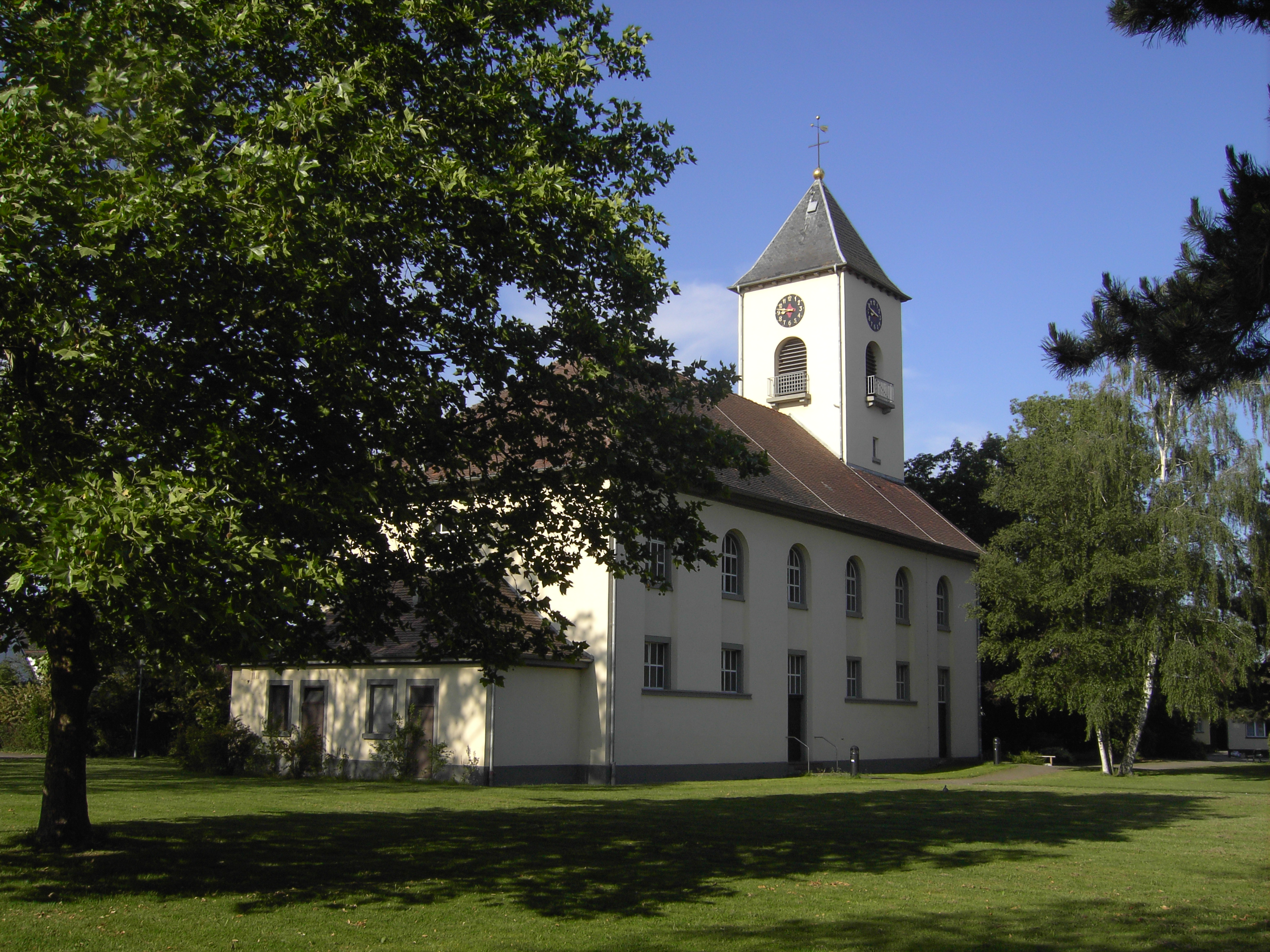
Protestant Church Friedrichstal

== History ==
Friedrichstal was founded by Huguenots from northern France, Belgium and Switzerland. The name Friedrichstal (Fridericiana Vallis) was given to the new settlement by Frederick VII, Margrave of Baden-Durlach, who had ceded the land and allowed the settlement.

The village was established from 1699 on a section of cleared Hardtwald forest with the addition of parts of the Spöck municipality. The inhabitants of the village of Spöck were probably not very enthusiastic at first when the margrave agreed with the later mayor of Friedrichstal Jacques de Gorenflo that around 70 new settlers would initially be distributed among empty houses in Spöck. The vacancies had arisen during the previous wars, reducing the village population to around 20 people.

Along the River Heglach, on the eastern edge of the Hardtwald, on the way from Spöck to Linkenheim, directly at the fork in the road to Schröck, today Leopoldshafen, 25 single-storey houses were to be built. A church was soon built in the middle of the settlement area. A well had already been built by the herdsmen of Spöck as a watering place for their cattle, which lived in the forest all year round. However, this led to annoyance with the citizens of Spöck, whereupon the people of Friedrichstal built the "Friedensbrunnen" (peace well) by hand in the Spöck district.

The size of the building plot for the house, yard, barn and garden was set at five ruthen in width, which corresponds to 15 meters, and 16 ruthen in length, which corresponds to 48 meters. The first farmhouses in Friedrichstal were half-timbered buildings, half with a cellar, single-storey and with timber-framed compartments.

The population brought tobacco seeds and Welschkorn seeds (maize seeds) and, through diligence and iron discipline, achieved a modest prosperity that soon spread to the neighboring villages. Welschkorn brought double and tobacco many times the grain yield. A family could live well on a plot of three Badische Morgen, 1.08 hectares. The expansion of the processing of tobacco into pipe tobacco and cigars provided further employment and improved incomes.

Communication with the citizens of the neighboring communities proved difficult at first, especially as the margraviate accepted the French language of the village for six decades. In addition to the Schultheißen appointed by the margrave, a spokesman for the new citizens was elected as mayor and was regarded as the second person in the village hierarchy. Furthermore, the population lived according to the strict rules of Calvin, while the populations of the neighboring communities were of Lutheran denomination.(See Staffort Book)

Since January 1, 1975, Friedrichstal has been part of the town of Stutensee, which was jointly founded by the neighboring communities of Blankenloch including Büchig, Friedrichstal, Spöck and Staffort. Since 1982, there has been a partnership with the French town of Saint-Riquier in Picardy, the region from which some of the founders of Friedrichstal once fled.

== Literature ==
- Heinz Bender:Vergangenheit und Zeitgeschehen: Blankenloch, Büchig und Schloss Stutensee; Hrsg: Gemeinde Stutensee mit Beiträgen von Klaus Demal und Hanspeter Gaal; Originalausgabe 872 Seiten Stutensee 1995
- Arnold Hauck: Duwaggbreche in Stutensee. Stutensee Hefte, Stadt Stutensee 2003
- Artur Hauer: Das Hardtdorf Spöck, Verlag Chr. Faaß Karlsruhe 1923; Neuauflage 1965 Heimat- und Kulturfreunde Spöck|Heimat- und Kulturfreunde Spöck e.V.
- Dieter H. Hengst: Die alten Straßen noch ...; Bildband "Alt-Friedrichsthal", Hrsg: Heimat- un Hugenottenmuseum Alt Friedrichsthal, 2. veränderte Auflage Dezember 2000
- Oskar Hornung: Friedrichstal; Geschichte einer Hugenotten-Gemeinde; zur 250-Jahrfeier / 1949 - 2. erg. Aufl.. - Friedrichstal: Bürgermeisteramt, 1974
- Günther Hornung und Bertold Gorenflo: „Friedrichstal – Meilensteine aus drei Jahrhunderten“, erschienen 2009, 200 Seiten
- Manfred G. Raupp: Die Entwicklung des Tabakanbaus in Deutschland unter besonderer Berücksichtigung der Entwicklung in der Gemeinde Staffort; Ingenieurschule Nürtingen 1962 und Zum früheren Tabakanbau der Hardt und seiner historischen Einordnung, Stutensee 2016, ISBN 978-3-945046-08-1
