= Pascal Borel =

German footballer (born 1978)

Personal information
- Date of birth: 26 September 1978 (age 48)
- Place of birth: Karlsruhe, West Germany
- Height: 1.92 m (6 ft 4 in)
- Position: Goalkeeper

Youth career
- 1983–1996: FC Germania Friedrichstal
- 1997–1997: Waldhof Mannheim

Senior career*
Years	Team	Apps	(Gls)
1997–1998	Waldhof Mannheim	3	(0)
1998–2002	Werder Bremen II	120	(0)
2000–2005	Werder Bremen	32	(0)
2005–2006	LR Ahlen	14	(0)
2007–2008	Budapest Honvéd	8	(0)
2009–2011	Chernomorets Burgas	60	(0)
2011–2013	RB Leipzig	33	(0)
Total		270	(0)

International career
1999	Germany U21	2	(0)
2002	Germany B	1	(0)

Managerial career
- 2013–2014: VfB Stuttgart U16 (goalkeeper coach)
- 2014–2020: Hannover 96 youth (goalkeeper coach)
- 2020–2021: Hannover 96 II (goalkeeper coach)
- * Club domestic league appearances and goals

Pascal Borel (born 26 September 1978) is a German football coach and former player who played as a goalkeeper. In 1999, Borel earned two caps for Germany at the U21 level.

== Playing career ==
Borel was born in Karlsruhe. He played for FC Germania Friedrichstal and Waldhof Mannheim before joining Werder Bremen in 1998 where he stayed until 2005. During his time at Werder Bremen he and goalkeeping rival Jakub Wierzchowski were labelled the "weakest goalkeepers in the Bundesliga" by Süddeutsche Zeitung journalist Ralf Wiegand.

In season 2007–08, he was part of Budapest Honvéd, where he made eight appearances playing in the Hungarian League.

In March 2009, Borel signed with Chernomorets Burgas until the end of the season. On 4 April 2009, he made his competitive debut for the team in a match against Lokomotiv Sofia. Borel quickly became part of the main team and on 28 May 2009 he received a new contract with the club until the end of 2010–11 season. He left the club on 10 June 2011 after his contract expired. Borel ended his career at RB Leipzig.

== Post-playing career ==
Borel worked as goalkeeper coach in VfB Stuttgart youth setup. He moved to Hannover 96 in 2014.

== Honours ==
Werder Bremen

- Bundesliga: 2003–04
- DFB-Pokal: 2003–04
- DFB-Ligapokal finalist: 2004
