= Maximilian Reule =

German footballer (born 1994)

Personal information
- Date of birth: 1 February 1994 (age 32)
- Place of birth: Neuenbürg, Germany
- Height: 1.89 m (6 ft 2 in)
- Position: Goalkeeper

Team information
- Current team: Sonnenhof Großaspach
- Number: 1

Youth career
- FV Bad Wildbad
- –2008: Germania Brötzingen
- 2008–2012: Karlsruher SC

Senior career*
| Years | Team | Apps | (Gls) |
| 2012–2014 | Karlsruher SC II | 50 | (0) |
| 2012–2014 | Karlsruher SC | 0 | (0) |
| 2014–2015 | Chemnitzer FC | 5 | (0) |
| 2014–2015 | Chemnitzer FC II | 8 | (0) |
| 2015–2017 | SV Wehen Wiesbaden | 4 | (0) |
| 2017–2020 | Sonnenhof Großaspach | 32 | (0) |
| 2020–2021 | SSV Ulm 1846 | 15 | (0) |
| 2021– | Sonnenhof Großaspach | 166 | (0) |
- * Club domestic league appearances and goals as of 26 June 2026

Maximilian Reule (born 1 February 1994) is a German footballer who plays as a goalkeeper for Regionalliga Südwest club Sonnenhof Großaspach.

== Career ==
Reule played at FV Wildbad and FC Germania Brötzingen as a youth player and then joined the youth department of Karlsruher SC. In 2012, he was promoted to the professional squad, but only made appearances for the reserve team. In 2014, Reule moved to Chemnitzer FC as their new backup goalkeeper and signed a contract until 30 June 2015, with an option for an extra year. On 1 November 2014, he made his professional debut against SV Wehen Wiesbaden, but after making five appearances, Philipp Pentke replaced him in the starting lineup. After the 2014–15 season, Reule signed a two-year contract with SV Wehen Wiesbaden. There, too, he could not beat out first goalkeeper, Markus Kolke, in competition, and was only utilised in four league matches in November to December 2016, as Kolke had suffered an injury.

For the 2017–18 season, Reule moved to league rivals SG Sonnenhof Großaspach, where he was used as a backup for Kevin Broll, but made appearances in the DFB Pokal. After Broll moved to Dynamo Dresden in 2019, Reule took over as the starting goalkeeper for Sonnenhof Großaspach.

== Honours ==
Sonnenhof Großaspach

- Regionalliga Südwest: 2025–26
- Oberliga Baden-Württemberg: 2024–25
