= Bismarck Gymnasium Karlsruhe =

School in Karlsruhe, Germany

Coordinates: 49°00′48″N 8°23′42″E

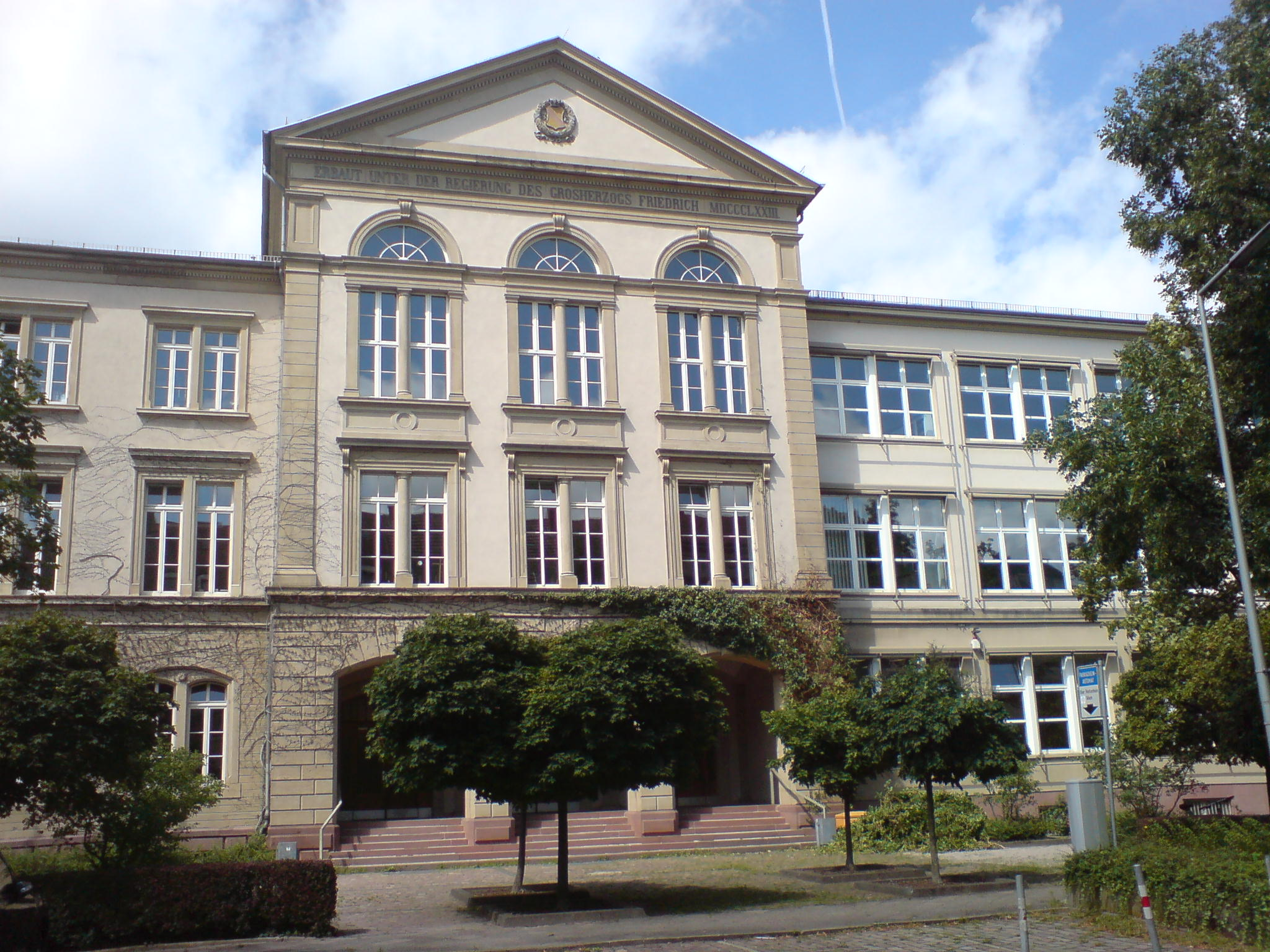
Bismarck-Gymnasium Karlsruhe

Bismarck Gymnasium Karlsruhe is a school in Karlsruhe.

== History ==
Bismarck Gymnasium Karlsruhe was founded as the Gymnasium Illustre 1586 by Ernest Frederick, Margrave of Baden-Durlach. It was located in the center of Durlach between the Stadtkirche Durlach and the Basler Tor. The margrave, who had a strict Lutheran upbringing, leaned towards Calvinism and employed Calvinist teachers at the grammar school.

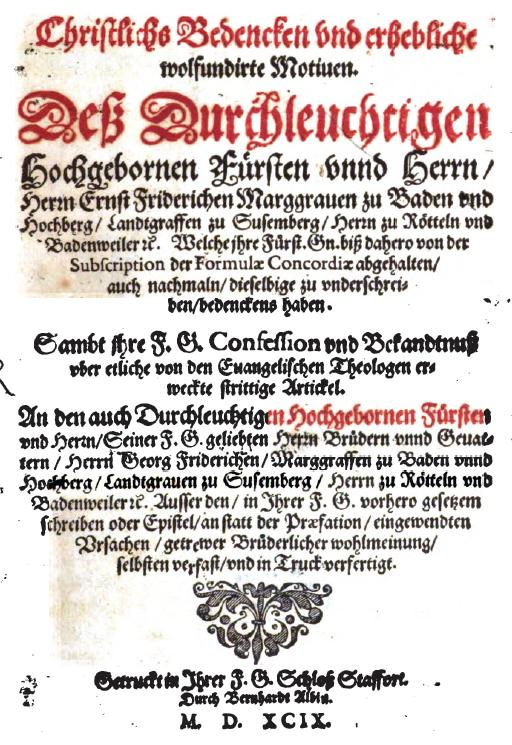
Title page of the Staffort Book of 1599

He had a theological book printed in the Staffort Castle, the Staffort Book, which was intended to reconcile the two denominations.

Between 1808 and 1814, the poet, philologist and Protestant theologian Johann Peter Hebel was director of the Lyceum and set a high point in German calendar history with his calendar reform, his contributions and a renaming of the calendar to.

In 1872, the Lyceum was given the name "Großherzoglich Fedorisches Gymnasium". In 1874, after the end of the German-French War, the school moved into the newly built school building in Bismarckstraße, where the school is still located today. The current headmistress is Mrs Hartenstein.

The principal at this time was Gustav Wendt, who reformed the school system in the spirit of Alexander von Humboldt. In 1938, the grammar school was renamed Bismarck-Gymnasium.

The oldest grammar school in Karlsruhe generated Carl Benz, the inventor of the automobile, as well as Karl Freiherr von Drais, the inventor of the bicycle and the typewriter.

Bismarck-Gymnasium also offers extracurricular activities, including various study groups, sports tournaments and festivals.

The study groups at Bismarck-Gymnasium are also successful at national level: the chess club came 5th in WK IV at the German School Chess Championships in 2019, and WK II came 3rd.
