= Daniel Reule =

German footballer (born 1983)

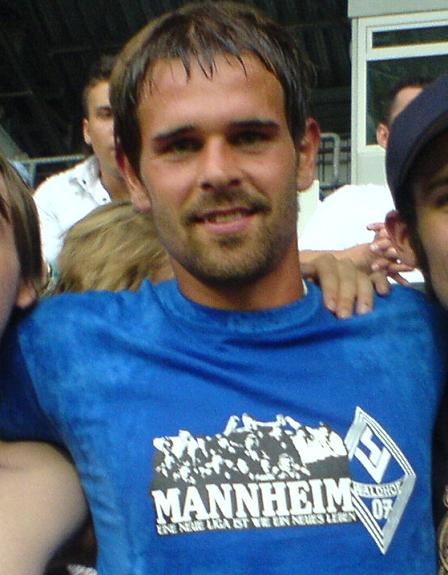
- Reule in 2008.

Personal information
- Full name: Daniel Reule
- Date of birth: 2 May 1983 (age 43)
- Place of birth: Neuenbürg, West Germany
- Height: 1.91 m (6 ft 3 in)
- Position: Forward

Team information
- Current team: SV Kickers Pforzheim

Youth career
- SV Enzklösterle
- 1. FC Birkenfeld
- –2003: VfR Pforzheim

Senior career*
Years	Team	Apps	(Gls)
2003–2005	Karlsruher SC	7	(0)
2005	TSG 1899 Hoffenheim	14	(4)
2006	1. FC Kaiserslautern II	12	(3)
2006–2007	TSG 1899 Hoffenheim	3	(0)
2007–2008	SV Waldhof Mannheim	24	(11)
2008–2009	FC Nöttingen	17	(12)
2009	SSV Reutlingen 05	17	(6)
2009–2010	SV Waldhof Mannheim	31	(11)
2010	Stuttgarter Kickers	10	(2)
2011–2012	SV Waldhof Mannheim	31	(10)
2012	TSV Grunbach	14	(1)
2013–	SV Kickers Pforzheim		
- * Club domestic league appearances and goals

Daniel Reule (born 2 May 1983, in Neuenbürg) is a German footballer who plays for SV Kickers Pforzheim as a striker. In the 2. Fußball-Bundesliga he has made seven appearances for Karlsuher SC between 2003 and 2005.

== Honours ==
In August 2011, Reule was nominated for the Goal of the Month award after he scored a bicycle kick against FC Bayern Munich II.
