= Theodor Burkhardt =

German footballer (1905–1958)

Personal information
- Date of birth: 31 January 1905
- Date of death: 14 March 1958 (aged 53)
- Position: Defender

Senior career*
Years	Team	Apps	(Gls)
- Germania Brötzingen

International career
1930	Germany	1	(0)
- * Club domestic league appearances and goals

Theodor Burkhardt (31 January 1905 – 14 March 1958) was a German international footballer.
