= Neuenbürg =

German town

- Town
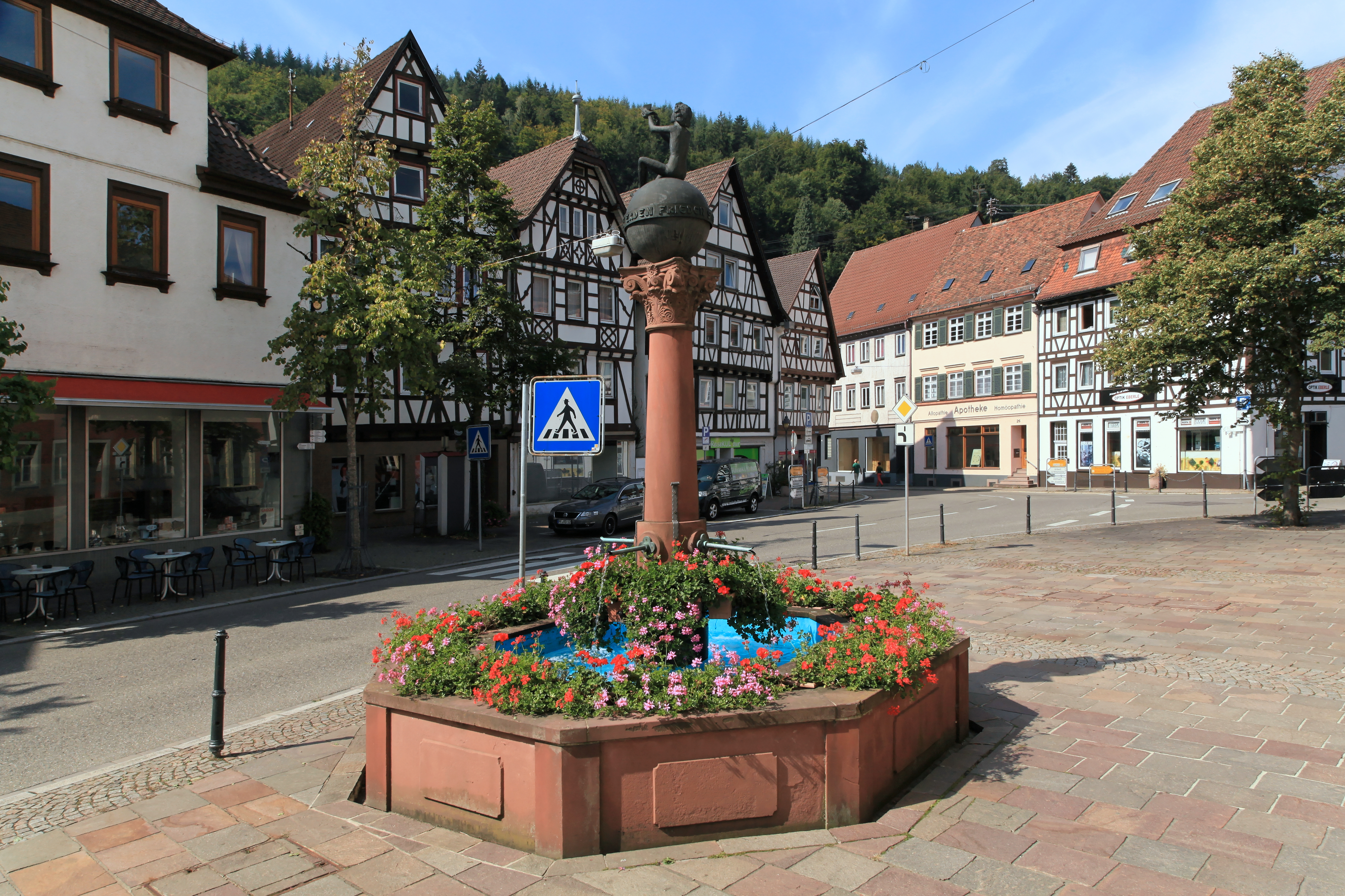
- Market square

- Coat of arms

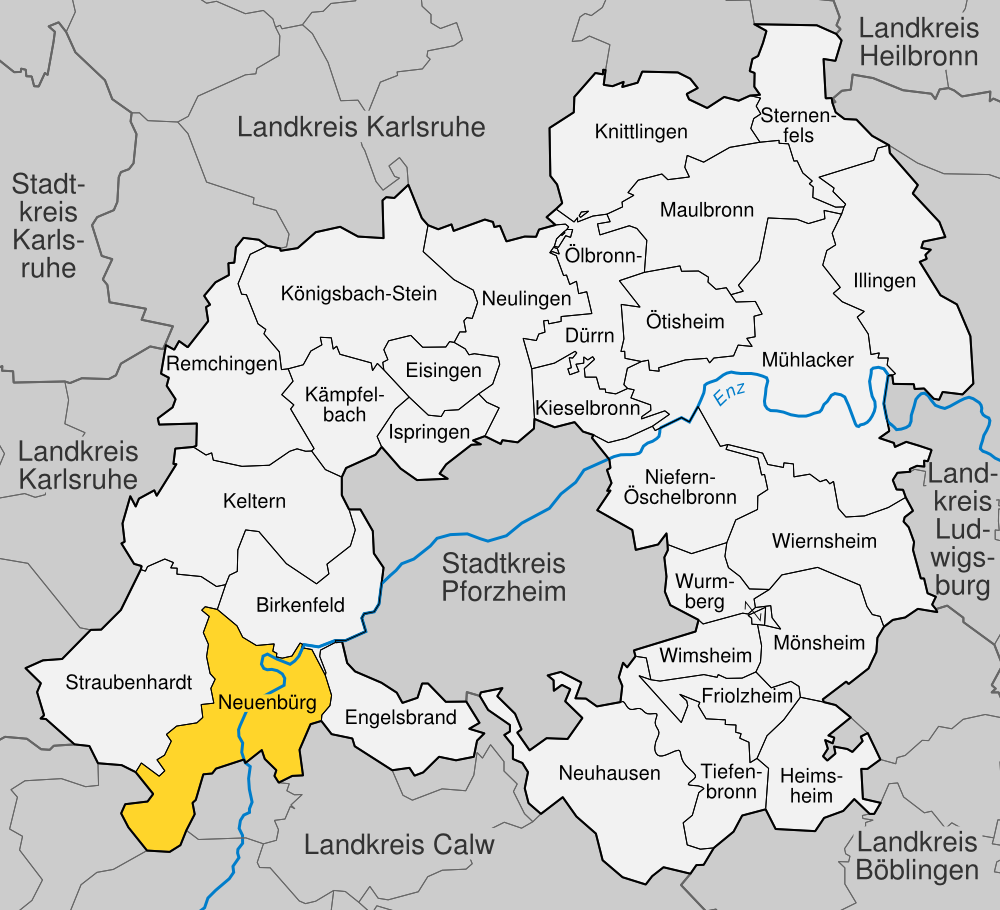
- Location of Neuenbürg within Enzkreis district
- Interactive map of Neuenbürg
- Location within Germany Location within Baden-Württemberg
- Coordinates: 48°50′46″N 8°35′20″E
- Country: Germany
- State: Baden-Württemberg
- Admin. region: Karlsruhe
- District: Enzkreis
- Subdivisions: 4

Government
  - Mayor (2022–30): Fabian Bader

Area
  - Total: 28.15 km^{2} (10.87 sq mi)
- Elevation: 323 m (1,060 ft)

Population (2025-12-31)
  - Total: 8,012
  - Density: 284.6/km^{2} (737.2/sq mi)
- Time zone: UTC+01:00 (CET)
  - Summer (DST): UTC+02:00 (CEST)
- Postal codes: 75305
- Dialling codes: 07082
- Vehicle registration: PF
- Website: www.neuenbuerg.de

Neuenbürg (German pronunciation: [ˈnɔʏənˌbʏʁk]) is a town in the Enz district, in Baden-Württemberg, Germany. It is situated on the river Enz, 10 km southwest of Pforzheim.

== History ==
Neuenbürg originated as a village around a castle built by the House of Vaihingen in the 12th century. Between 1315 and 1322, Neuenbürg became a possession of the Counts of Württemberg, who gave it town rights. With the villages of Arnbach, Dennach, and Waldrennach, Neuenbürg was assigned its own district. On 18 March 1806, that district was reorganized as Oberamt Neuenbürg. The Oberamt was dissolved on 1 October 1938 and its constituents were assigned to the Calw district. When the Enz district was created by the 1973 Baden-Württemberg district reform on 1 January 1973, Neuenbürg and its villages were assigned to it. Arnbach, Dennach, and Waldrennach were fully incorporated into Neuenbürg on 1 January 1975.

== Geography ==
The township (Stadt) of Neuenbürg covers 28.17 square kilometers (10.88 mi^{2}) of the Enz district, within the state of Baden-Württemberg and the Federal Republic of Germany. It is physically located on the Pfinzhügelland, on the southern reaches of the Kraichgau. The geological makeup of the municipal area is decided by the meeting of the Pfinzhügelland's muschelkalk and keuper and the Black Forest's buntsandstein plateaus. The main watercourse is the Enz, which flows in a deep bed of Middle Buntsandstein. Where the Enz flows into Birkenfeld marks the lowest elevation above sea level in the municipal area, 309 meters (1,014 ft) Normalnull (NN). The highest is the top of the Heuberg, south of Dennach, at 709 meters (2,326 ft) NN.

A portion of the Eyach and Rotenbach Valley Federally-protected nature reserve is found within Neuenbürg's municipal area.

== Coat of arms ==
Neuenbürg's municipal coat of arms depicts a red, hexagonal tower upon a field of white. The oldest images to be associated with the township are from 1440, as an engraving, and in 1490, from a print. The first coat of arms associated with Neuenbürg is from 1535, and showed the tower in red but the field as being blue. The change to a white field was made in 1956 by agreement of the municipal government and the Central State Archive Stuttgart. This pattern was then approved by the Federal Ministry of the Interior on 18 February 1958.

== Transport ==
The town has three stops, Neuenbürg, Neuenbürg Süd and Neuenbürg Freibad, on route S6 of the Karlsruhe Stadtbahn, which operates over the Enztalbahn railway.

== Notable people ==
- Adolph Carl August von Eschenmayer (1768–1852), philosopher and physician
- Robert Gaupp (1870–1953), psychiatrist and neurologist
- Ralf Metzler (born 1968), physicist who focuses on statistical mechanics and anomalous diffusion
- Daniel Reule (born 1983, footballer who has played over 160 games
- Maximilian Reule (born 1994) football goalkeeper who has played over 190 games
