= Staffort Book =

1599 religious-historical work

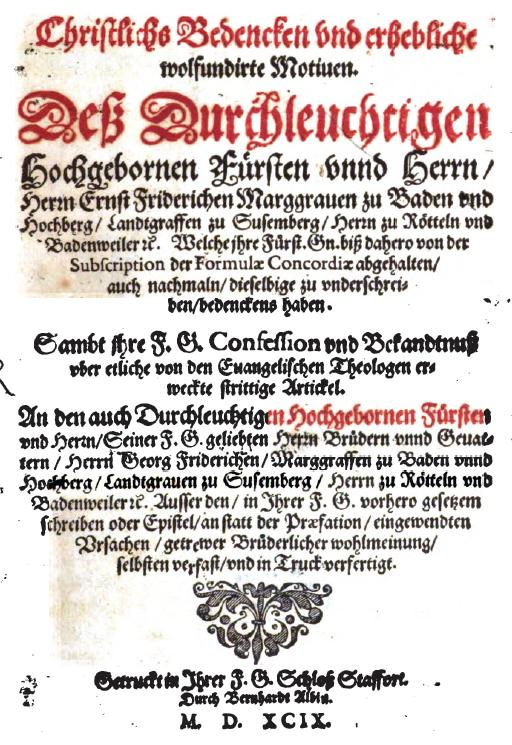
Title page of the Staffort Book of 1599

The Staffort Book is a religious-historical work that was printed in 1599 in the Staffort Castle printing house and is regarded as an attempt by Margrave Ernst Friedrich von Baden-Durlach to reconcile Lutheran and Calvinist doctrine.

== History ==
Karl II of Baden-Durlach married the Protestant Princess Kunigunde of Brandenburg-Kulmbach in 1551. He converted to the Protestant doctrine and ordered the introduction of Protestant worship in the Margraviate of Baden-Durlach with the church order he issued on June 1, 1556.

After his death in 1577, his son Ernst Friedrich von Baden-Durlach inherited the lower margraviate with the offices of Durlach, Mühlburg, Pforzheim, Graben and Staffort. He was a friend and patron of the sciences and is said to have enjoyed spending time in Staffort Castle. In 1584, he founded the Gymnasium Illustre, which was named Ernestinum after its founder.

While he was brought up as a devout Lutheran at a young age, he later also leaned towards Calvinism. From 1595, he attempted to introduce a reformed doctrine in the margraviate, also appointing reformed pastors and civil servants, but met with considerable resistance from his people and his Württemberg neighbors. He appointed Calvinizing teachers to the Gymnasium-Illustre and pursued intensive theological studies himself. Above all, he opposed the Formula of Concord of the Lutheran Church (1577) and refused to sign it. He had a print shop set up in Staffort Castle and employed the Speyer Huguenot printer Bernhardt Albin in his service to have his own printed works produced in Staffort.

Two of his own books were printed in Staffort: firstly the Kurtze und einfeltige außer Gottes Wort und der Alten Rechtgläubigen Kirchen gestellte Bekanntnuß nach welcher als einer Richtschnur die Kirchen und Schuldiener in der Markgravschaft Artikel so in diesen Zeiten zwischen denjenigen so sich zur Augsburgischen Konfession bekennen contovertierend und strittig sind, in ihren anvertravertrauen Kirchen und Schulen zu verhalten haben (Staffort 1599). The larger book, which went down in church history as the Staffort Book, was published in the same year. The title is: Christliche Bedenken und erhebliche wohlfundierte Motiven Deß Durchleuchtigen Hochgebornen Fürsten, Herrn Friederichen Marggraven zu Baden und Hochberg etc. welche ihre Fürstliche Gnaden bis dahero von der Subcription der Formulä Concordiä abgehalten, auch nachmalen dieselbe zu unterschreiben Bedenken, haben, sambt Ihre Fürstlichen Gnaden Confession und Bekanntnuß über etliche von den Evangelischen Theologen erweckte strittige Artikel. Printed in your F. G. Castle Staffort by Bernhardt Albin M.D.XCIX.

Staffort was the last place of work for the book printer Albin, whose prints are known from 1581 onwards. He died at the turn of the year 1599/1600. His widow described herself as a printer in 1600, but no further printed works are known. The second edition of the "Glaubens-Bekanntnuß" was printed "Auf New übersehen und verbessert" in Heidelberg in 1601.

The book triggered a huge storm against the margrave in Baden. He had abandoned the foundations of the Baden Reformation. The resistance in the state was supported by the Lutheran faculty of the University of Tübingen with counter-writings, which on the other hand described him as a "fundamentally learned gentleman". Resistance was particularly strong in Pforzheim, especially as the citizens there did not want to accept the relocation of the residence to Durlach and the loss of tax privileges. When the margrave set out to resolve the confused situation by force if necessary, he died at Remchingen Castle on April 14, 1604, before achieving his goal.

Under his successor Georg Friedrich von Baden-Durlach, the old church order of 1556 was reinstated in full. The Baden church union only came about in 1821, after the Calvinist denomination had become widespread in Baden due to the immigration of Huguenots (Neureut, Stutensee-Friedrichstal) and the Reichsdeputationshauptschluss. The Staffort book thus initiated a discussion that only led to the union of the Protestant Christians in Baden 222 years later.

To mark the 200th anniversary of the church union in Baden, the Staffort Book was translated into the current language by theologian Holger Müller and published by Klotz Verlagshaus.

== Literature ==
- Christlichs Bedenken und erhebliche wohlfundierte Motiven Deß Durchleuchtigen Hochgebornen Fürsten, Herrn Friederichen Marggraven zu Baden und Hochberg etc. welche ihre Fürstliche Gnaden bis dahero von der Subcription der Formulä Concordiä abgehalten, auch nachmalen dieselbe zu unterschreiben Bedenken, haben, sambt Ihre Fürstlichen Gnaden Confession und Bekanntnuß über etliche von den Evangelischen Theologen erweckte strittige Artikel. Getruckt in Ihrer F. G. Schloß Staffort Durch Bernhardt Albin M.D.XCIX. Digitalisat der BSB München
- Kurtze vnd Einfeltige ausser Gottes Wort vnd der Alten Rechtglaubigen Kirchen gestelte Bekandtnuß, Nach welcher, alß nach einer Richtschnur, die Kirchen vnd Schuldiener der Marggraffschafft Baden, sich in den Artickeln, so in diesen zeiten, zwischen den jenigen, die sich zur Augspurgischen Confession bekennen, Controuertirent vnd strittig sein … im lehren, zuuerhalten haben, Staffort 1599 Google-Digitalisat
- Werner Baumann: Das Staffortsche Buch. Ernst Friedrichs Tod. In: Werner Baumann: Ernst Friedrich von Baden-Durlach. Die Bedeutung der Religion für Leben und Politik eines süddeutschen Fürsten im Zeitalter der Gegenreformation (= Veröffentlichungen der Kommission für geschichtliche Landeskunde in Baden-Württemberg. Reihe B: Forschungen. Band 20). W. Kohlhammer, Stuttgart 1962, S. 156–171.
- Johannes Ehmann: Geschichte der Evangelischen Kirche in Baden. Band 1: Reformatorische Bewegungen im Südwesten des Reichs (1518–1557): Von Luthers Heidelberger Disputation bis zum Augsburger Frieden und seinen Nachwirkungen. Evangelische Verlagsanstalt, Leipzig 2018; Band 2: Die Geschichte der Markgrafschaft. Evangelische Verlagsanstalt, Leipzig 2021.
- Johannes Ehmann, Gottfried Gerner-Wolfhard (Hrsg.): Vereinigte Evangelische Landeskirche in Baden 1821–2021. Geschichte, Gottesdienste, Gemeinde. Neulingen 2020, ISBN 978-3-948968-01-4.
- Wilhelm Otto Hauck: Staffort – Schloß und Dorf an der steten Furt. Gemeinde Stutensee 1993.
- Volker Leppin Der Kampf des Markgrafen Ernst Friedrich von Baden um sein Bekenntnis und der Widerstand in Pforzheim und im Anhang Bekenntnis Markgraf Ernst Friedrichs in Reformierte Spuren in Baden (= Veröffentlichungen des Vereins für Kirchengeschichte in der Evangelischen Landeskirche in Baden. Band 57). ISBN 3-87210-912-X.
- Leon F. Raupp, Manfred G. Raupp: Das Schloss zu Staffort, Druckort des Stafforter Buches. Stutensee und Lörrach 2021, ISBN 978-3-945046-20-3.
- Udo Wennemuth: 450 Jahre Reformation in Baden und Kurpfalz. Kohlhammer, Stuttgart 2009, ISBN 978-3-17-020722-6.
- Marlis Zeus: Das Bürkleskreuz in Singen. In: Die Löbliche Singergesellschaft von 1501 Pforzheim und andere Geschichten aus der Markgrafschaft Baden. Selbstverlag, Pforzheim 2001, ISBN 3-00-008225-5 (mit den Themen Das „Stafforter Buch“ und die Folgen, Warum die Drucklegung in Staffort? und Der Streit mit den Pforzheimer Protestanten).
- Gunter Zimmermann: Das „Staffortsche Buch“ als Einführung in die reformierte Theologie. In: Arbeitsgemeinschaft für geschichtliche Landeskunde am Oberrhein e. V., 431. Protokoll über die Tagung „Konfession und Politik in Baden um 1600 Tagung zum 400. Todestag des Markgrafen Ernst Friedrich von Baden (1560–1604)“ in Karlsruhe-Durlach.
- Holger Müller, Johannes Ehmann und Manfred G. Raupp: Das Stafforter Buch, Baden zwischen Calvin und Luther, J.S. Klotz Verlagshaus Neulingen 2021, ISBN 978-3-948968-55-7
  - English Version: The Staffort Book, Baden between Calvin and Luther, Klotz Verlagshaus Neulingen 2022, ISBN 978-3-949763-04-5 and available free of charge on Regionalia Open at Staffort Book as PDF-Version.
