= FC Germania Friedrichstal =

German football club

- Full name: Fussball Club Germania Friedrichstal e.V.
- Founded: 23 November 1913
- Ground: FC-Sportplatz
- Manager: Michael Streichsbier
- League: Verbandsliga Baden (VI)
- 2015–16: Oberliga Baden-Württemberg (V), 17th (relegated)
Home colours	Away colours

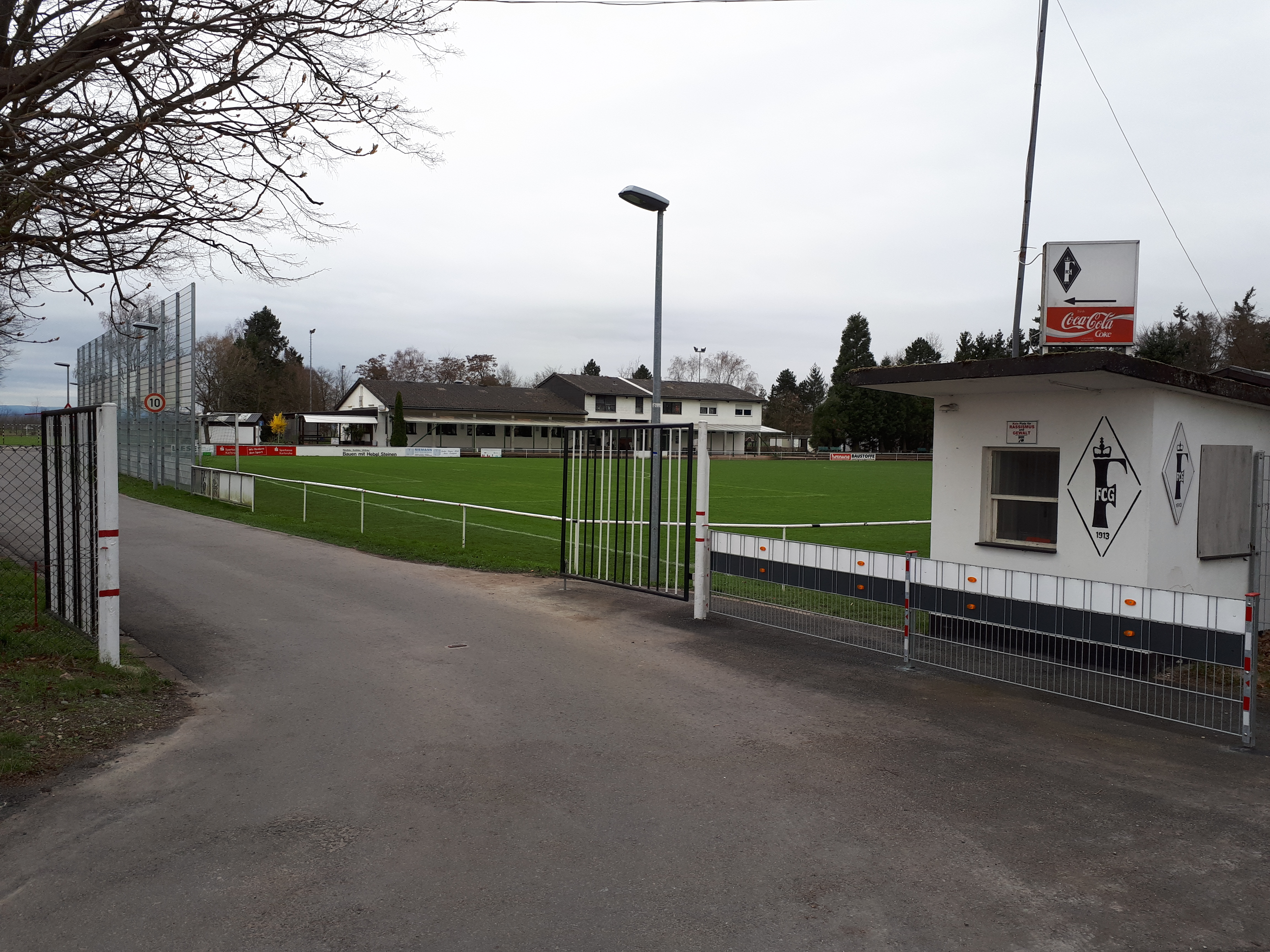
Stutensee Stadium

The FC Germania Friedrichstal is a German association football club from Friedrichstal, Baden-Württemberg.

The club achieved its greatest success in 2014 when it earned promotion to the Oberliga Baden-Württemberg for the first time.

== History ==
FC Germania Friedrichstal was formed on 23 November 1913. Because of the effects of the First World War the club had to withdraw from football soon after, in 1915. After the war the club restarted in the lowest possible division, the local C-Klasse but had to withdraw from league football once more from 1925 to 1928. FC even had to leave the Southern German Football Association because of financial troubles caused by the hyperinflation in Germany. Upon returning to competitive football the club played in the local C and B-Klasse again until 1939 when the Second World War brought football to a halt again.

On 1 January 1946 the club once more reformed but now adopted the name Sportfreunde Friedrichstal. In 1947 Sportfreunde resumed league football, now joining the A-Klasse and, in 1951, the club returned to its pre-war name FC Germania Friedrichstal. After playing in local amateur football for the most part of its history FC won promotion to the 2. Amateurliga Mittelbaden in 1968, finishing runners-up in its first season there. In 1972 a division title in the 2. Amateurliga earned the club promotion to the Amateurliga Nordbaden for the first time, the third tier of German football.

At this level Germania struggled, narrowly avoiding relegation in its first year but coming last in its second and dropping back down to the 2. Amateurliga. In 1975 the village of Friedrichstal together with four other villages amalgamated to form the municipality of Stutensee. It was also decided by the local football clubs to hold an annual Stutenseepokal, a local cup competition. In 1978 the club won the 2. Amateurliga once more and thereby qualified for the Verbandsliga Baden, the new fourth tier of local football, below the also newly introduced Oberliga Baden-Württemberg. FC Germania would play the next twelve seasons in the Verbandsliga.

The first couple of seasons in the Verbandsliga Germania spend as a lower table side but, from 1982, performances improved, culminating with a third-place finish in 1984–85. In the same year the team also reached the final of the Baden Cup but lost to SV Sandhausen. After 1986 however the club started to decline and was eventually relegated in 1990.

By the late 1980s the club was financially struggling, having to pay off depth. The seasons immediately after being relegated from the Verbandsliga Germania almost suffered another relegation but narrowly managed to stay in the Landesliga for the time. In this time youth player Jens Nowotny left the club to join near-by Karlsruher SC and eventually rise to become a German international. In 1993 the club dropped out of the Landesliga down to the Bezirksliga and, in the following season, to the A-Klasse. It took the club until 1999 to recover from this and return to the Bezirksliga. In 2001–02 the club was back in the Landesliga for a season but suffered immediate relegation. It returned to the Landesliga in 2004 and finished runners-up in its first season back. The following year it won the league and returned to the Verbandsliga.

Germania played the next eight seasons in the Verbandsliga. In 2009–10 it finished runners-up in the league but failed in the promotion round to the Oberliga. It got another change for Oberliga promotion in 2013–14, when it came third in the Verbandsliga but runners-up FC Astoria Walldorf II declined the option to play in the promotion round. Germania, in its place, was successful against SV Linx and SV Göppingen and earned promotion to the Oberliga Baden-Württemberg for the first time. After two Oberliga seasons as a lower table side Friedrichstal was relegated in 2016.

== Honours ==
The club's honours:

=== League ===
- Verbandsliga Baden (VI)
  - Runners-up: 2010
- 2. Amateurliga Mittelbaden (IV)
  - Champions: 1972, 1978
- Landesliga Mittelbaden (VI)
  - Champions: 2006
  - Runners-up: 2005

=== Cup ===
- Baden Cup
  - Runners-up: 1985

== Recent seasons ==
The recent season-by-season performance of the club:

Season	Division	Tier	Position
1999–2000	Bezirksliga	VII	4th
2000–01	Bezirksliga	VII	↑
2001–02	Landesliga Mittelbaden	VI	↓
2002–03	Bezirksliga	VII	
2003–04	Bezirksliga	VII	↑
2004–05	Landesliga Mittelbaden	VI	2nd
2005–06	Landesliga Mittelbaden	VI	1st ↑
2006–07	Verbandsliga Baden	V	10th
2007–08	Verbandsliga Baden	V	13th
2008–09	Verbandsliga Baden	VI	7th
2009–10	Verbandsliga Baden	VI	2nd
2010–11	Verbandsliga Baden	VI	4th
2011–12	Verbandsliga Baden	VI	8th
2012–13	Verbandsliga Baden	VI	7th
2013–14	Verbandsliga Baden	VI	3rd ↑
2014–15	Oberliga Baden-Württemberg	V	12th
2015–16	Oberliga Baden-Württemberg	V	17th ↓
2016–17	Verbandsliga Baden	VI	

- With the introduction of the Regionalligas in 1994 and the 3. Liga in 2008 as the new third tier, below the 2. Bundesliga, all leagues below dropped one tier.

=== Key ===
↑ Promoted	↓ Relegated
