= Staffort =

Coordinates: 49°05′31″N 8°30′41″E

Staffort is an old German village between Karlsruhe and Bruchsal - since 1975 the village is part of the town Stutensee which was created by joining together with Blankenloch, Friedrichstal and Spöck. Stutensee-Staffort has roughly 2000 inhabitants (2011).

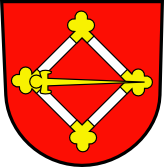
Coat of Arms of Staffort

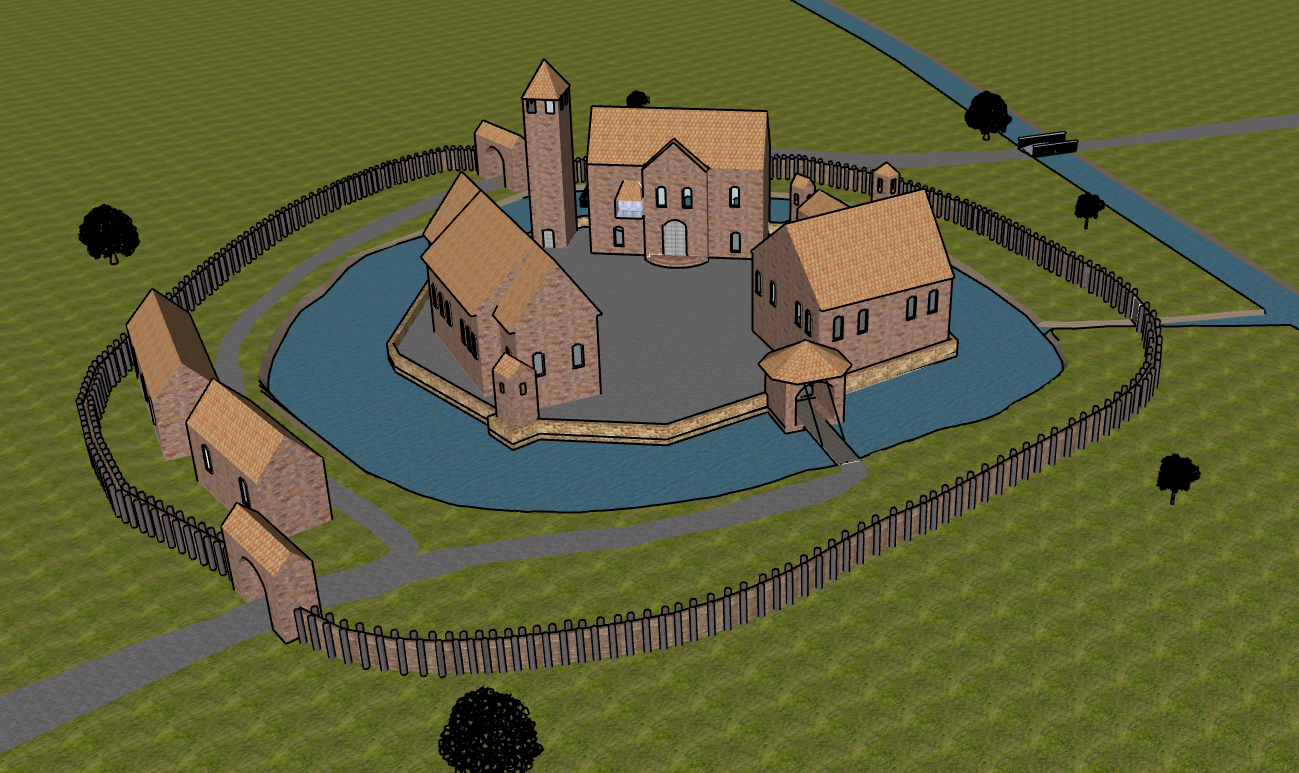
Staffort Castle 1599 according to Leon & Manfred Raupp

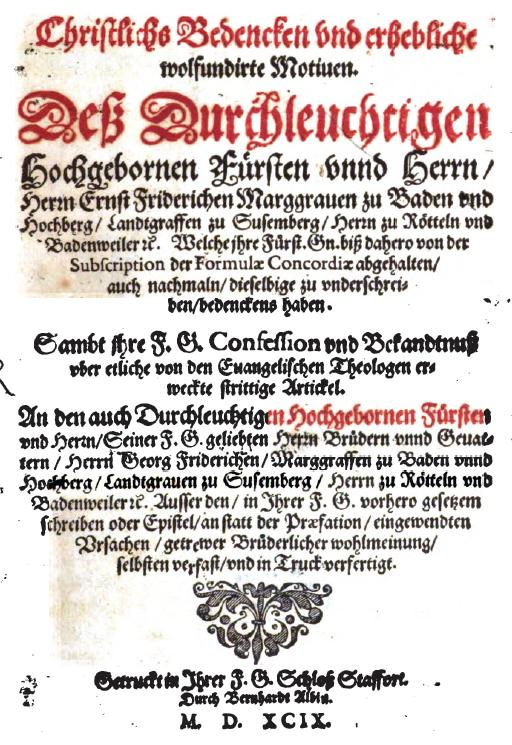
Title page of the Staffort Book of 1599

== History ==
Staffort means "constant trudge ford" (stete stapfen Furt) as the location was the only feasible place to cross the Pfinz River, and so was strategically important in the wider region since ancient times. Excavations and artifacts that were discovered evidence a settlement existing near by the Pfinz 25 AD. The first mention of Staffort occurred in 1110 when the Emperor Heinrich V. named the village Stafphort in an official document.

The Staffort Book is a religious-historical work that was printed in 1599 in the Staffort Castle printing house and is regarded as an attempt by Margrave Ernst Friedrich von Baden-Durlach to reconcile Lutheran and Calvinist doctrine. A translation into modern English is available.

== Economy ==
Until around 1950, farming was the main source of income and self-sufficiency for more than 90% of families in Staffort. The village living and working community was the guiding principle of the village for centuries. The farm structure was therefore characterized by small farms, the predominant farm size in Staffort, as everywhere in Baden, was less than 2 ha until the middle of the 20th century. In Staffort, 135 farms cultivated an area of 0.5-2 ha, 95 farmers owned between 2 and 5 ha and only three farmers owned between 5 and 10 ha. Due to the small size of the farms, many families were dependent on additional income. A special feature of Staffort was the widespread production and processing of hemp and flax, tobacco cultivation from 1860 onwards and the production of clogs - which is commemorated by the traditional "Staffort clog race".

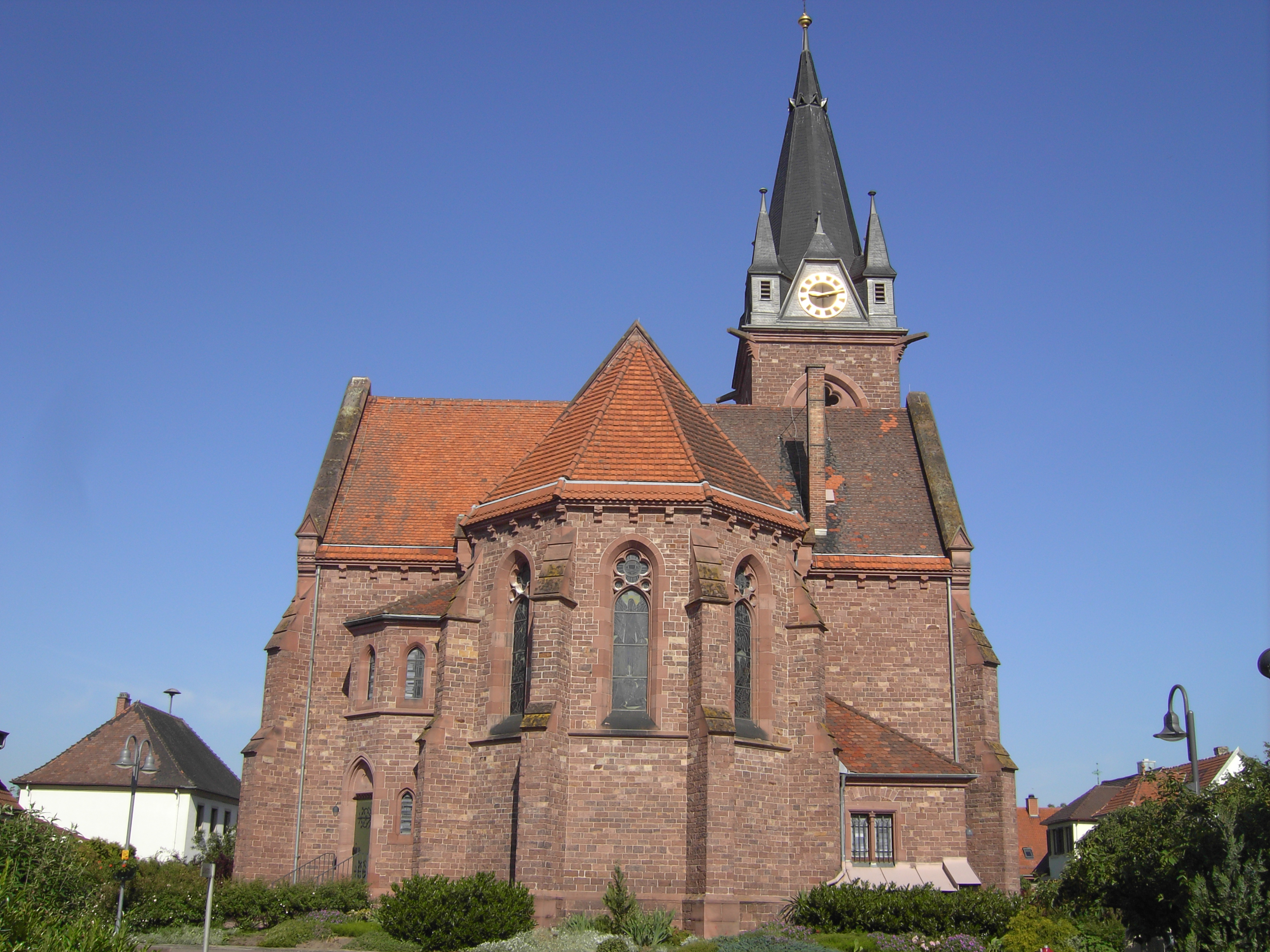
Protestant Church at Staffort

== People ==
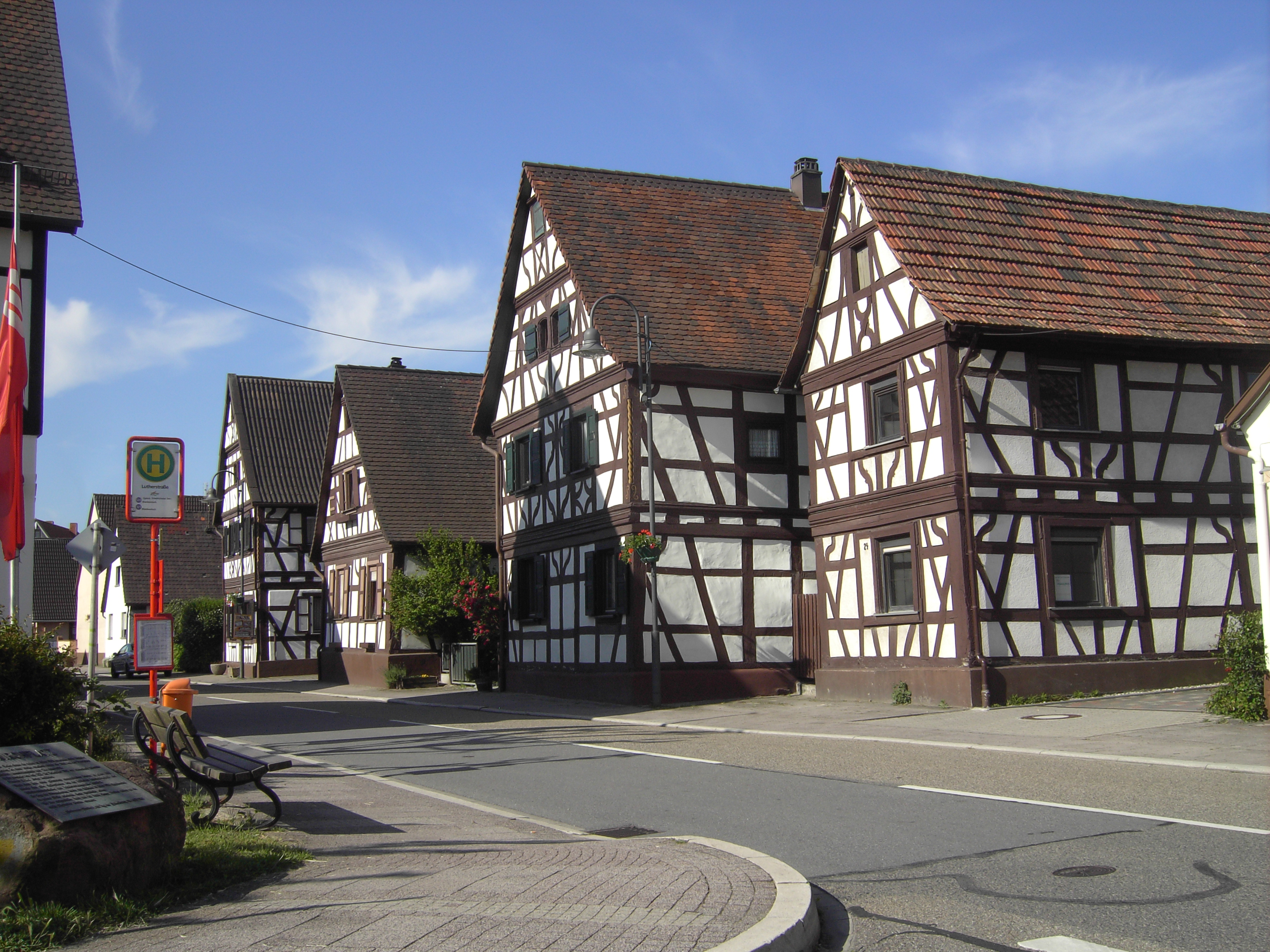
Timber framing houses at Staffort

In the municipal book out of 1837 the following existing family names are mentioned: Amolsch, Brauch, Beideck, Dürr, Enderlin, Ernst, Gamer, Glaser, Hager, Hauck, Hauth, Hecht, Heidt, Kohler, Malsch, Maier, Mezger, Nagel, Oberacker, Raupp, Stahl, Stober, Schilling, Scholl, Schoppinger, Sickinger, Süß, Waidmann, Winnes.

During the 18th and 19th centuries nearly 100 inhabitants left the village to relocate in America, Austria, Denmark, Hungary, Jutland, Prussia, Russia, Serbia and Styria.

== Literature ==
- Wilhelm Hauck: Staffort - Schloß und Dorf an der steten Furt (Ortschronik). Gemeinde Stutensee 1993
- Manfred G. Raupp: Ortsfamilienbuch Staffort, Herausgeber Stadt Stutensee, Verlag Gesowip Basel 2010, ISBN 978-3-906129-64-8
