= Staffort Castle =

Coordinates: 49.0945°N 8.5083°E

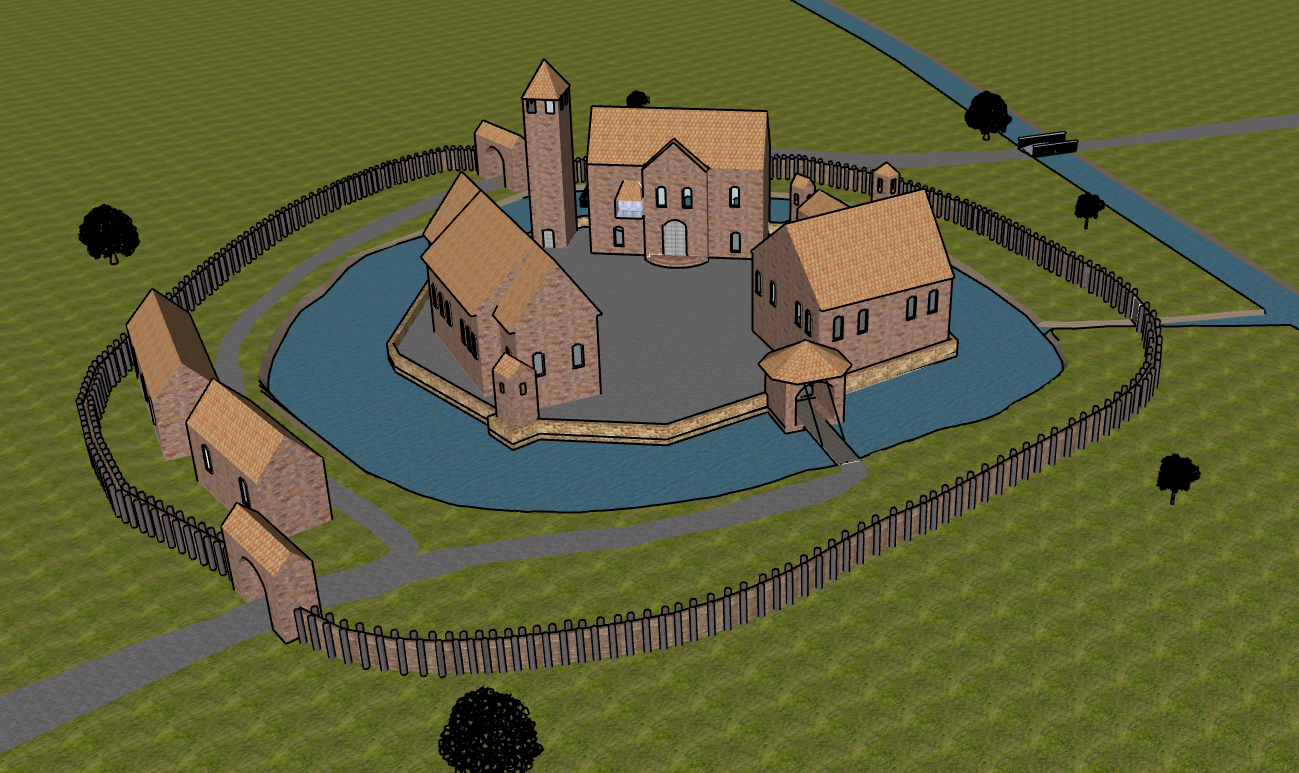
Staffort Castle 1599, reconstruction by Leon & Manfred Raupp

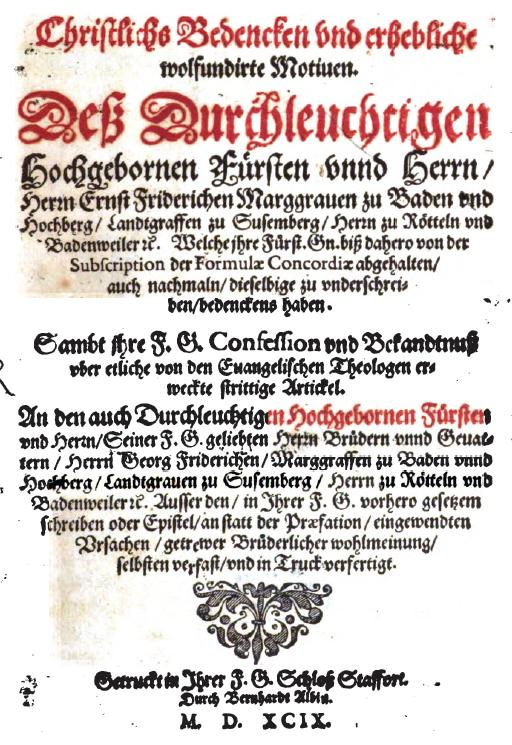
Title page of the Staffort Book of 1599

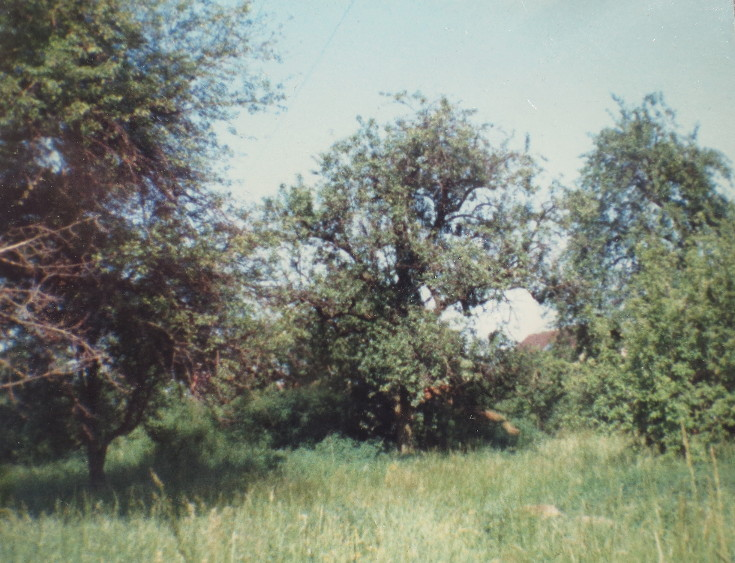
Overburden mound of the former Staffort Castle around 1980

The Staffort Castle (also moated castle, water castle or deep castle) was the building in Staffort, a district of the town of Stutensee, where the Staffort Book was printed in 1599. Schmalkalder's plan from 1689, which shows the dimensions of the foundation walls, is the only surviving document relating to the castle plan.

== History ==
Already in Roman times there was a Roman fort on the trade route from Hochstetten to the Roman station Stettfeld at the "stete Furt", the crossing over the "Sumpfbach" (the Pfinz). Four Roman plates with the potter's stamp JUCUNDUS and DOMINA - TUS FE were found here. The stone house of the "Knight of Staphurt" was probably built on the foundations of this Roman fortification. In 1157, Ruedegerus de Staphurt is mentioned for the first time in a document as a servant of the Bishop of Speyer. In 1377, Gerhard von Staphurt placed himself in the service of the Baden Margrave as a noble servant. After several disputes between the Bishop of Speyer, Ruprecht von der Pfalz and Margrave Bernhard I, the castle and village finally remained in Baden's possession from 1424. The complex, including farm buildings such as stables, barns, storehouses and armories, was surrounded by a moat, rampart and wall. The castle, which was later referred to as Schloss, gradually emerged.

The garden next to the castle was one acre in size, there was a fruit grove and a moat rich in fish. The castle was probably in its best condition at the time of the Reformation and was often visited by Margrave Ernst Friedrich. During this time, the margraves of Baden took part in the debates of their time about the "right doctrine". Books on the religious policy of the Margraves of Baden-Durlach were produced in the palace's own print shop. The castle experienced its literary highlight with the printing of the "Staffort Book" by Book printer Margrave Margrave Ernst, lord of the lower margraviate from 1584, presented a compendium of Reformed doctrine in an attempt to mediate between Lutheran and Calvinist teachings.

The castle was damaged or devastated on various occasions during armed conflicts: in 1273, the castle, then owned by Margrave Rudolf I, was destroyed by the Roman-German King. In 1404, it was the Count Palatine of the Rhine who burnt down the castle and destroyed the village down to its foundations. Peasant bands from the Bruhrain-Region, who followed Tilly's victorious army, plundered and pillaged 1627 Staffort and in 1676 it was destroyed by French troops. The castle was struck again in 1681: On July 10, a lightning strike caused a powder explosion in the tower, which tore it down to its foundations.

In 1689, French troops under General Melac completed the work of destruction during the Palatinate War of Succession. The village, the castle and the margrave's building yard were razed to the ground. A report from 1692 states that Staffort Castle was "completely burnt and blown to pieces". Although the village and the castle were rebuilt again and again over the course of history, the castle was not rebuilt after the last destruction.

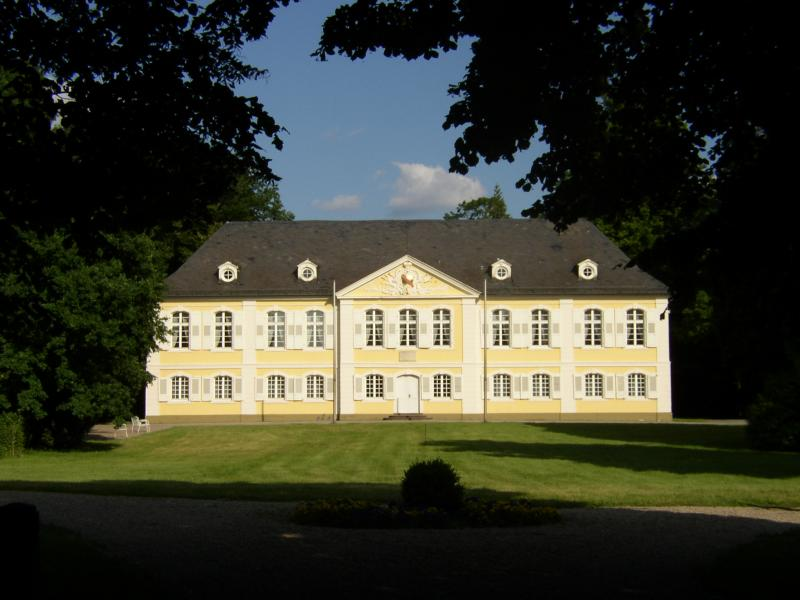
Stutensee Castle built from the stones of Staffort Castle

The castle ruins were used as a quarry for the construction of Schloss Stutensee as well as for the construction of some of Staffort's foundations and the mill in Friedrichstal. Pieces of wall from the castle can be found on barns in Staffort, and the church mound in Staffort is also said to have originated from spoil from the castle. Parts of a door frame were found in the Heglach, but have not yet been recovered.

Today, an inconspicuous hill at the western entrance to the village of Staffort, the Schlossbuckel, is a modest reminder of Staffort Castle and its former importance for the region.

== Literatur ==
- Konrad Dussel: Staffort 1110 bis 2010: Streifzüge durch 900 Jahre Geschichte, Verlag Regionalkultur Heidelberg, Ubstadt-Weiher, Basel 2010, ISBN 978-3-89735-622-1
- Wilhelm Otto Hauck: Staffort – Schloß und Dorf an der steten Furt (Ortschronik), Gemeinde Stutensee 1993
- Artur Hauer: Das Hardtdorf Spöck, Verlag Chr. Faaß Karlsruhe 1923; Neuauflage 1965 Heimat- und Kulturfreunde Spöck e.V.
- Hanna Heidt: Erinnerungen an die Vergangenheit. Eigenverlag, Schwanen Stutensee-Staffort 2003
- Leon F. Raupp und Manfred G. Raupp: Das Schloss zu Staffort, Druckort des Stafforter Buches, Stutensee und Lörrach 2021, ISBN 978-3-945046-20-3
- Manfred G. Raupp: 4000 Jahre Stete Furt und 350 Jahre Kirchenbuchaufzeichnungen, Stutensee-Staffort 2010; Ortsfamilienbuch Staffort, Herausgeber Stadt Stutensee, Verlag Gesowip Basel 2010, ISBN 978-3-906129-64-8
