= SV Kickers Pforzheim =

German football club

- Full name: Sport Verein Kickers Pforzheim e.V.
- Founded: 2011
- Ground: Sportzentrum Wilferdinger Höhe
- Capacity: 3,000
- League: Kreisklasse C1 Pforzheim (XI)
- 2016–17: inactive
Home colours	Away colours

The SV Kickers Pforzheim is a German association football club from the town of Pforzheim, Baden-Württemberg.

The club was formed in a merger of two local clubs in Pforzheim in 2011. Its greatest success came in 2014 when it won promotion to the Oberliga Baden-Württemberg, the highest football league in the state.

== History ==
The club was formed in 2011 in a merger of Germania Brötzingen and 1. FC Eutingen. Of the two clubs Germania Brötzingen had been the more successful, playing as high as the Gauliga Baden in the 1930s. Eutingen's greatest achievements were two seasons in the Amateurliga Nordbaden and a Baden Cup win in 1950. The merger came only a season after two other well known Pforzheim clubs, 1. FC Pforzheim and VfR Pforzheim merged to form 1. CfR Pforzheim.

The new club inherited the league place of Germania Brötzingen in the tier seven Landesliga Mittelbaden. After a seventh place in 2012 the club won this league and promotion the following season. In its first year in the Verbandsliga Baden Kickers won the league and earned promotion to the Oberliga. The club came last in the Oberliga in 2014–15 and was relegated back to the Verbandsliga, followed by a last place in this league in 2015–16. Instead of relegation, Kickers' first team resigned from competitive football. Amid financial constraints leading to the departure of many players, the club was inactive in 2016–17 to form youth teams. The first team joined the C-Klasse for the 2017–18 season.

== Honours ==
The club's honours:

- Verbandsliga Baden
  - Champions: 2014
- Landesliga Mittelbaden
  - Champions: 2013

== Seasons ==
The season-by-season performance of the club:

Season	Division	Tier	Position
2011–12	Landesliga Mittelbaden	VII	7th
2012–13	Landesliga Mittelbaden	VII	1st ↑
2013–14	Verbandsliga Baden	VI	1st ↑
2014–15	Oberliga Baden-Württemberg	V	18th ↓
2015–16	Verbandsliga Baden	VI	16th ↓
2016–17	inactive		
2017–18	Kreisklasse C1 Pforzheim	XI	

=== Key ===
↑ Promoted	↓ Relegated
