= Stutensee =

- Town
- Coat of arms

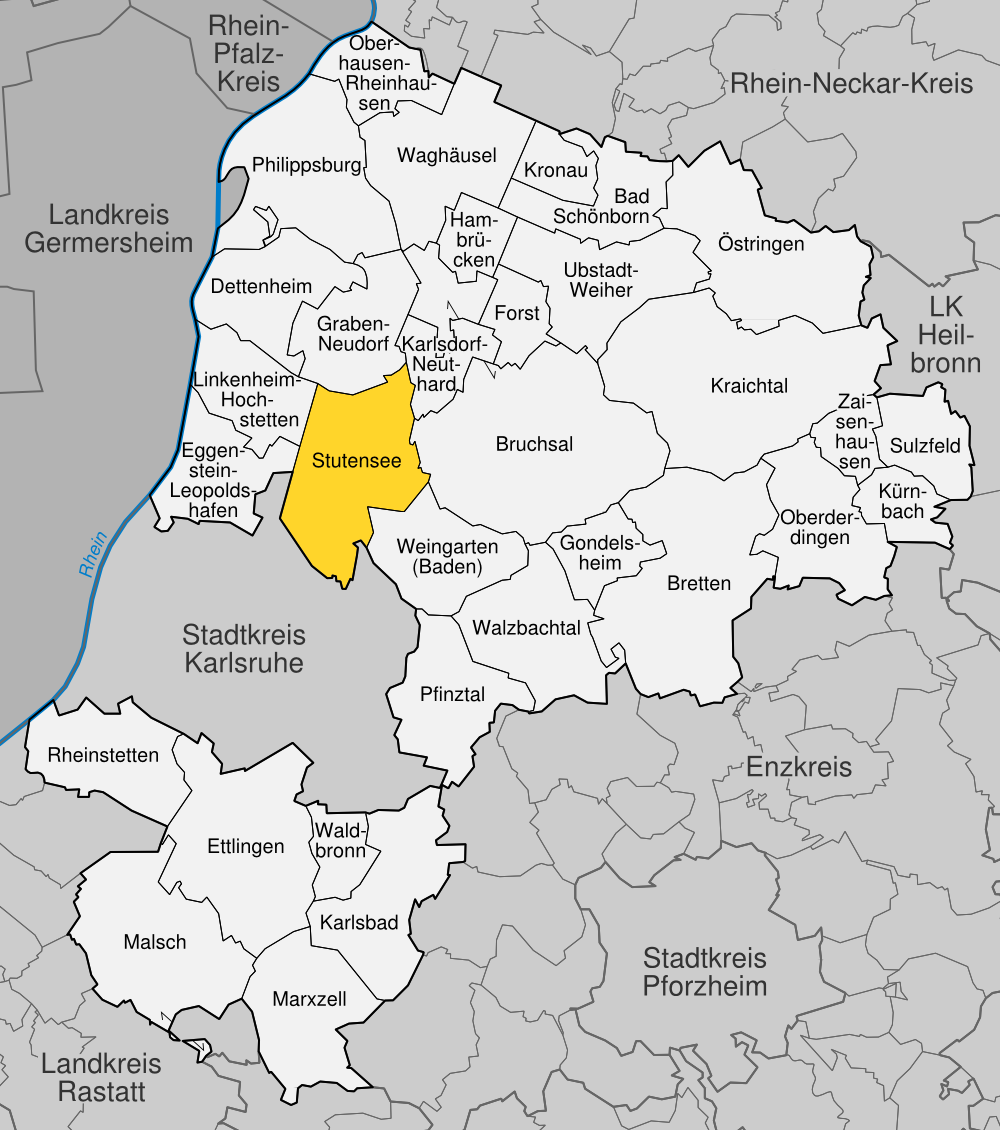
- Location of Stutensee within Karlsruhe district
- Interactive map of Stutensee
- Location within Germany Location within Baden-Württemberg
- Coordinates: 49°03′53″N 8°28′18″E
- Country: Germany
- State: Baden-Württemberg
- Admin. region: Karlsruhe
- District: Karlsruhe
- Subdivisions: 4

Government
  - Mayor (2018–26): Petra Becker (Ind.)

Area
  - Total: 45.68 km^{2} (17.64 sq mi)
- Elevation: 114 m (374 ft)

Population (2025-12-31)
  - Total: 25,422
  - Density: 556.5/km^{2} (1,441/sq mi)
- Time zone: UTC+01:00 (CET)
  - Summer (DST): UTC+02:00 (CEST)
- Postal codes: 76288–76297
- Dialling codes: 07244, 07249, 0721
- Vehicle registration: KA
- Website: www.stutensee.de

Stutensee (German pronunciation: [ˈʃtuːtn̩zeː]) is a town in northern Karlsruhe district in Baden-Württemberg, Germany.

It was founded in 1975 by the voluntary connection of the four villages of Blankenloch (with Büchig), Friedrichstal, Spöck and Staffort. In the meantime it has become a lively city with more than 23,000 inhabitants.

== Palace of Stutensee ==
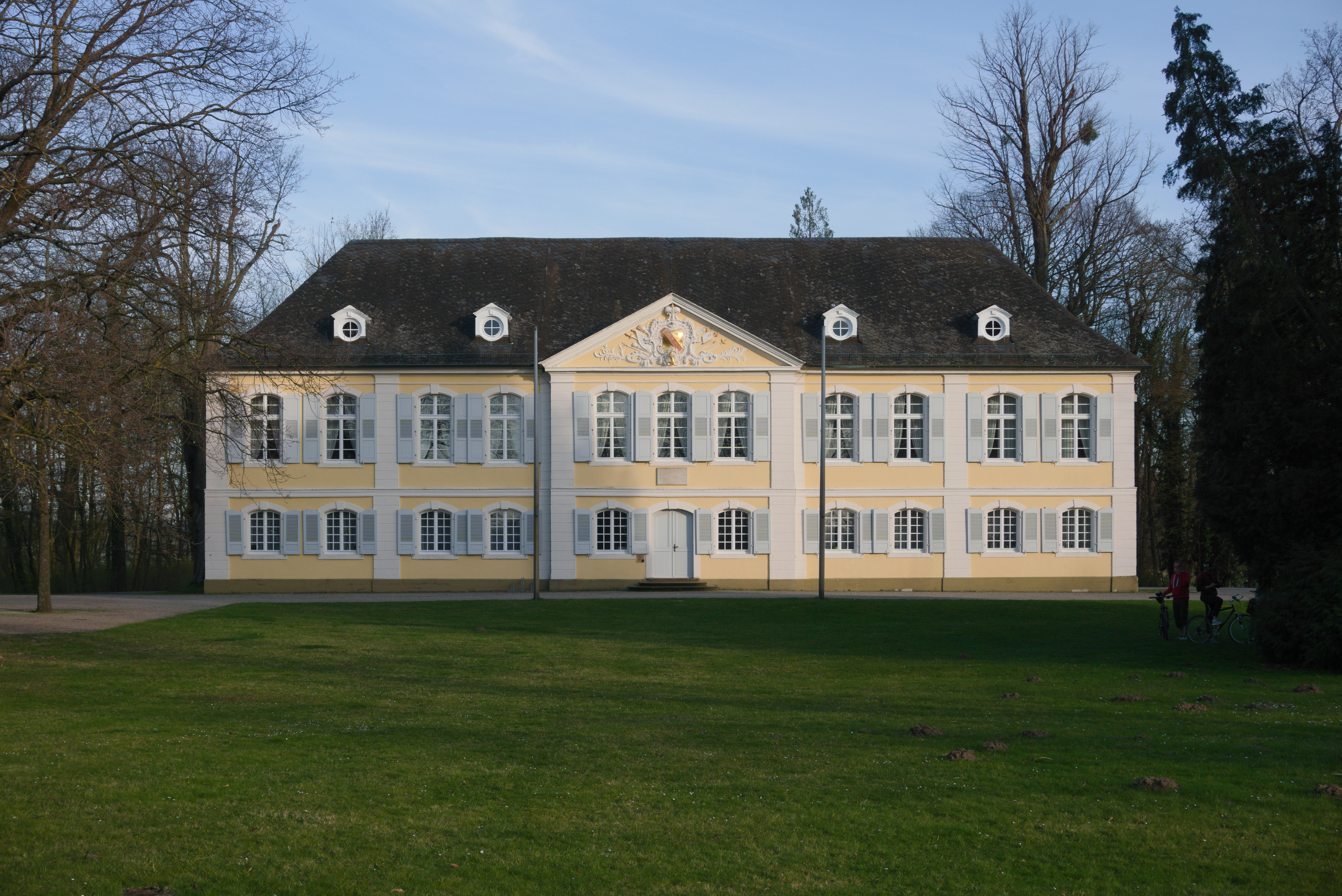
Schloss Stutensee

The Palace of Stutensee is the geographic center and namesake of the city. It was built in 1749 by Charles Margrave of Baden, by the 1,000-year-old oak trees. Today an institution of the Landeswohlfahrtsverband is located here.

== Geography ==
The city is situated between Karlsruhe and Bruchsal in the Upper Rhine region and its altitude is 114 m (374 ft).

== History ==
Stutensee was founded on 1 January 1975 when the four villages of Blankenloch (with Büchig), Friedrichstal, Spöck and Staffort were combined into one municipality. All parts of the town are old villages. Spöck was first mentioned in official documents as Speccha in 865, Staffort 1110 as Stafphort, Blankenloch 1337 as Blankelach and Büchig 1373 as Buchech. Friedrichstal was founded in 1699. Huguenots fleeing religious persecution came from the north of France, and also by way of Belgium and Switzerland.

== Traffic ==
Stutensee can be reached via the federal highway 5 Karlsruhe-Frankfurt (Karlsruhe-Durlach, Karlsruhe-Nord and Bruchsal junctions). Federal highways 3 (Buxtehude-Weil am Rhein) and 36 (Mannheim-Lahr/Schwarzwald) pass to the east and west of the town of Stutensee.

There is a train station and a stop on the Mannheim-Rastatt railroad line in the districts of Blankenloch and Friedrichstal. Local public transport is primarily served by the S2 light rail line of the Karlsruhe Transport Association (KVV). The stops in Stutensee are Büchig (Büchig), Süd, Tolna-Platz, Kirche, Mühlenweg, Nord (Blankenloch), Saint-Riquier-Platz, Mitte, Nord (Friedrichstal), Hochhaus and Richard-Hecht-Schule (Spöck). The extension of the S2 from Blankenloch to Friedrichstal and Spöck was opened on 24/25 June 2006. This means that only the Staffort district is not connected to the light rail. Several bus lines supplement the public transport network in the city area.

== Education ==
Stutensee has the following schools: Erich-Kästner-Realschule, Thomas-Mann-Gymnasium, Pestalozzi-Grund- und Hauptschule Blankenloch, Theodor-Heuss-Grundschule Büchig, Friedrich-Magnus-Schule Friedrichstal (Grund- und Hauptschule mit Werkrealschule), Richard-Hecht-Schule Spöck (Grund mit Werkrealschule) and Drais-Grundschule Staffort.

There are also six Protestant and three municipal and three Roman Catholic kindergartens.

The adult education center in Stutensee is a public institution for further education. It is a branch of the non-profit organization Volkshochschule im Landkreis Karlsruhe.

== Sport ==
One of the town's association football club FC Germania Friedrichstal, formed in 1913, experienced its greatest success in 2014 when it won promotion to the Oberliga Baden-Württemberg for the first time.

== See also ==
- Staffort Castle

== Notable people ==
- Daniel Caspary, Member of the European Parliament
- Werner Fischer, former President of the University of Applied Sciences in Karlsruhe
- Manfred G. Raupp, agricultural scientist and economist
- Werner Raupp, historian and philosopher
- René Repasi, Member of the European Parliament

== Gallery ==
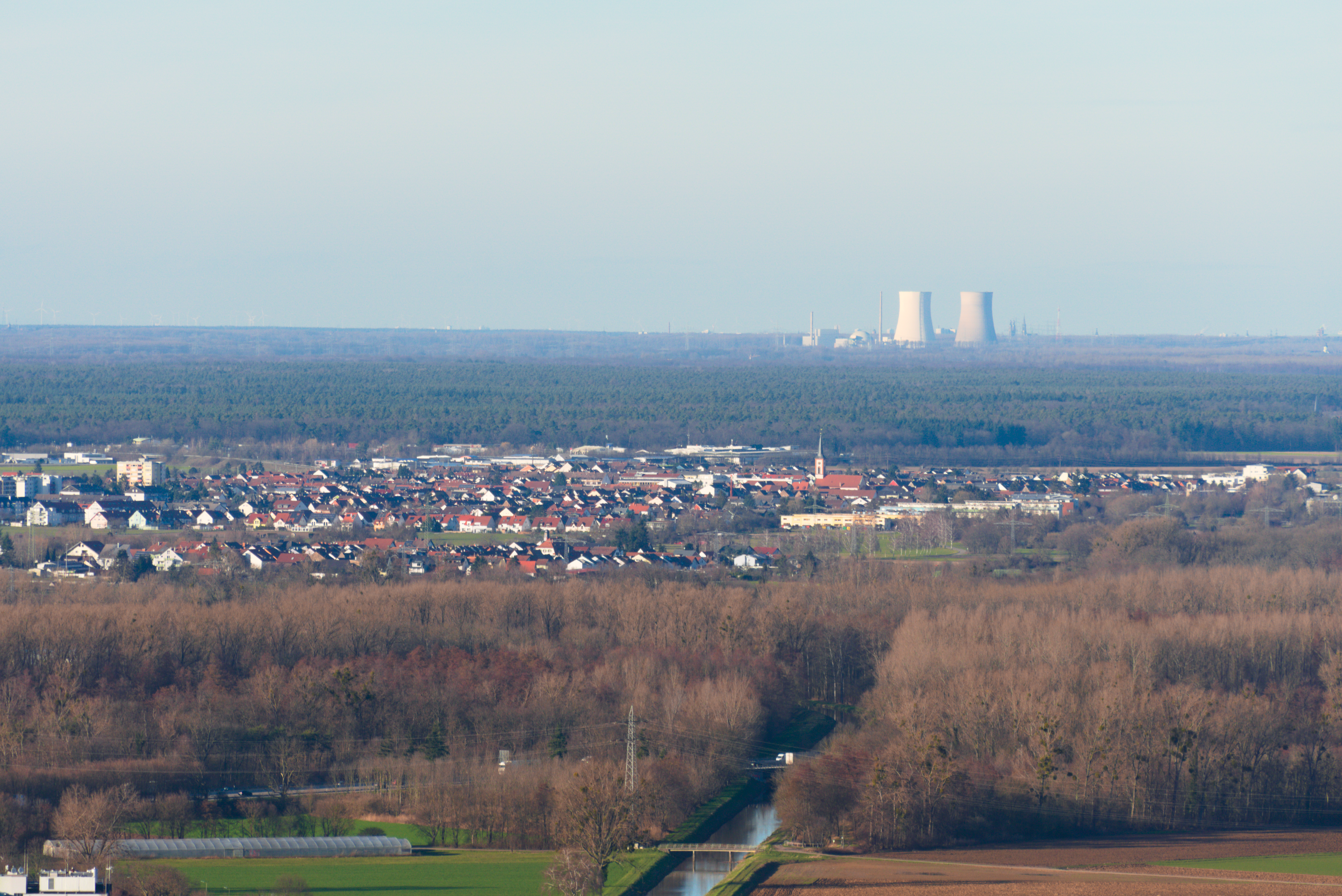
Blankenloch as viewed from Turmberg in Karlsruhe-Durlach

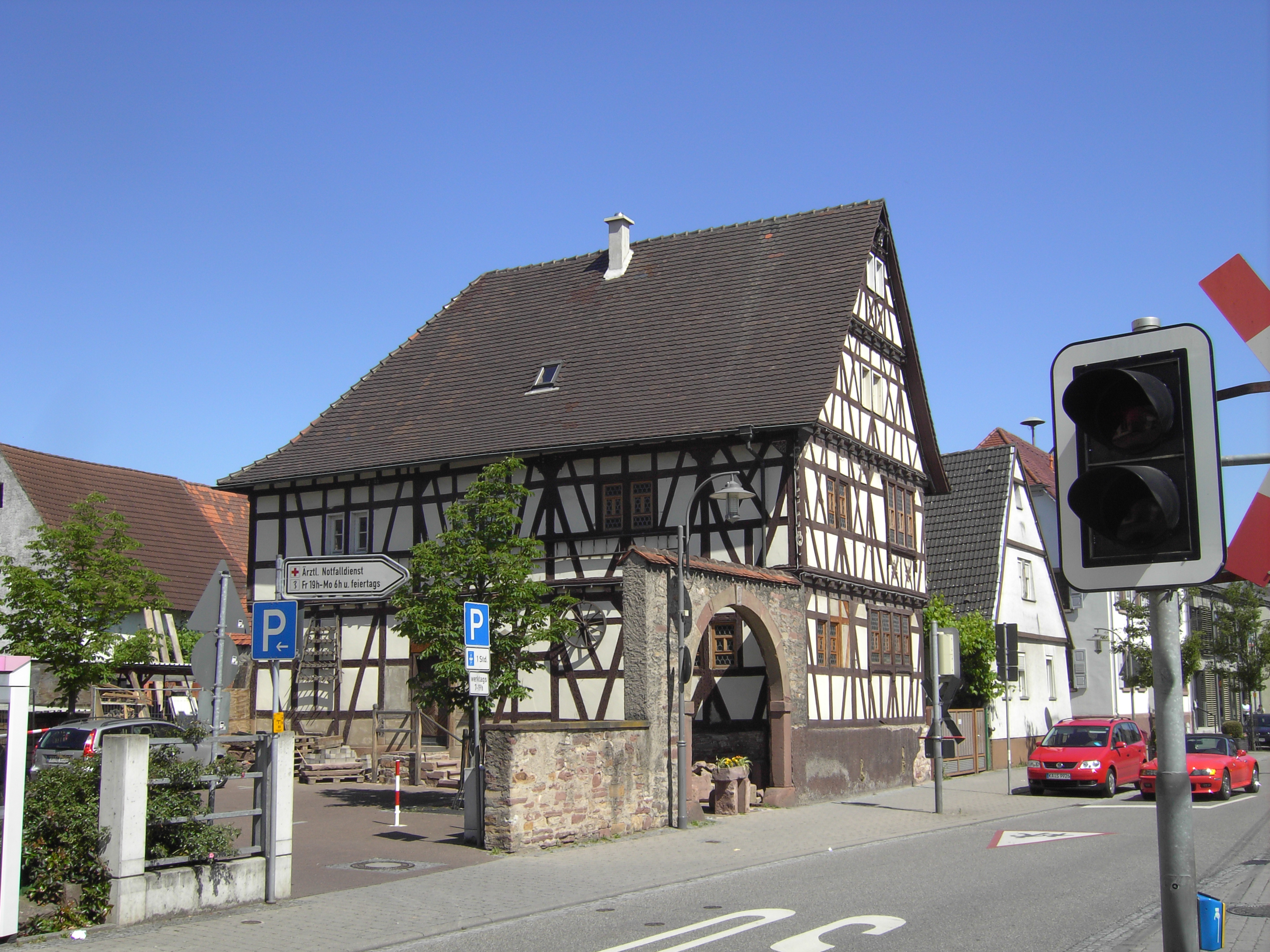
Kerns-Max-House at Blankenloch

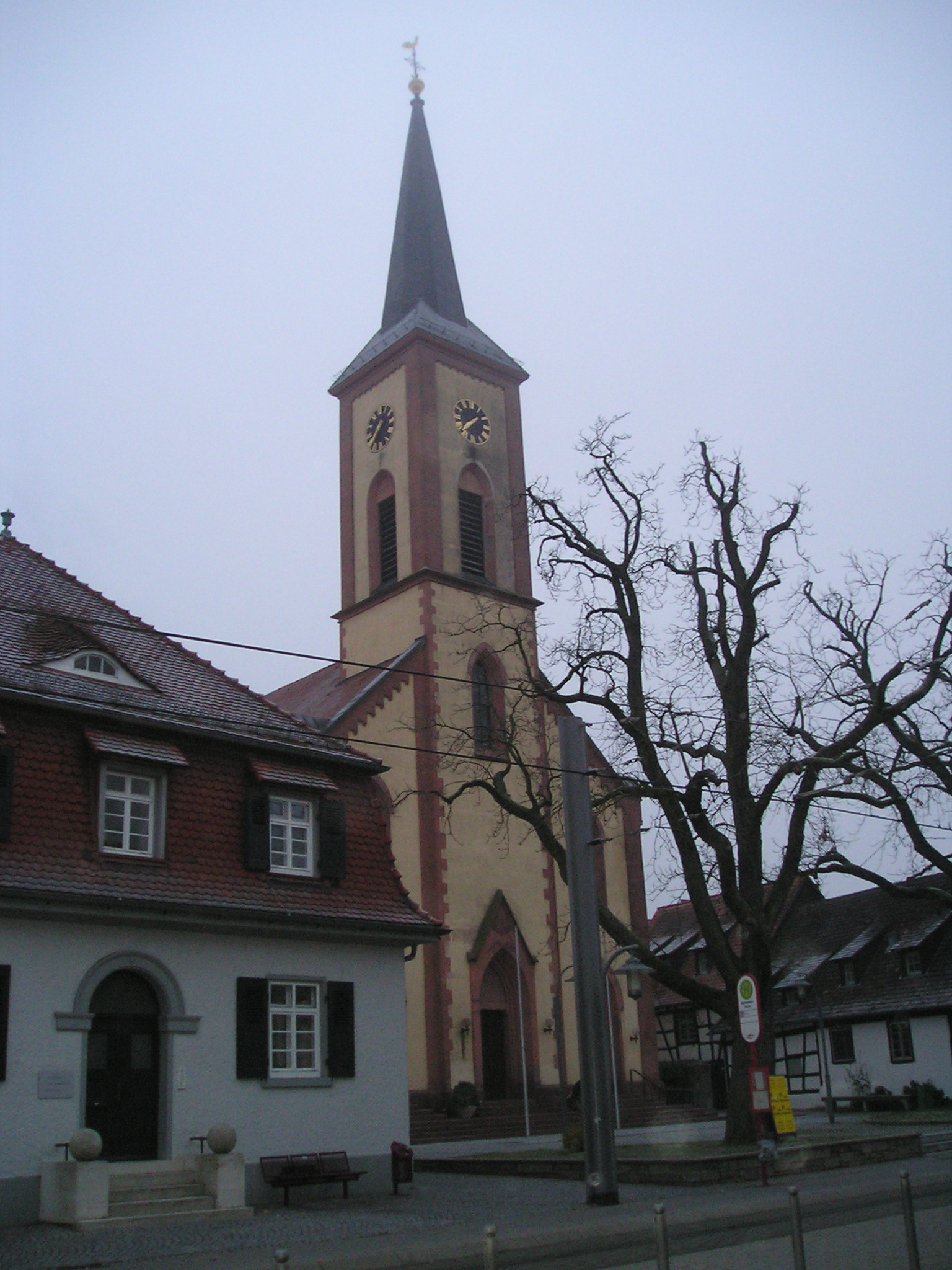
Protestant Church in Stutensee-Blankenloch

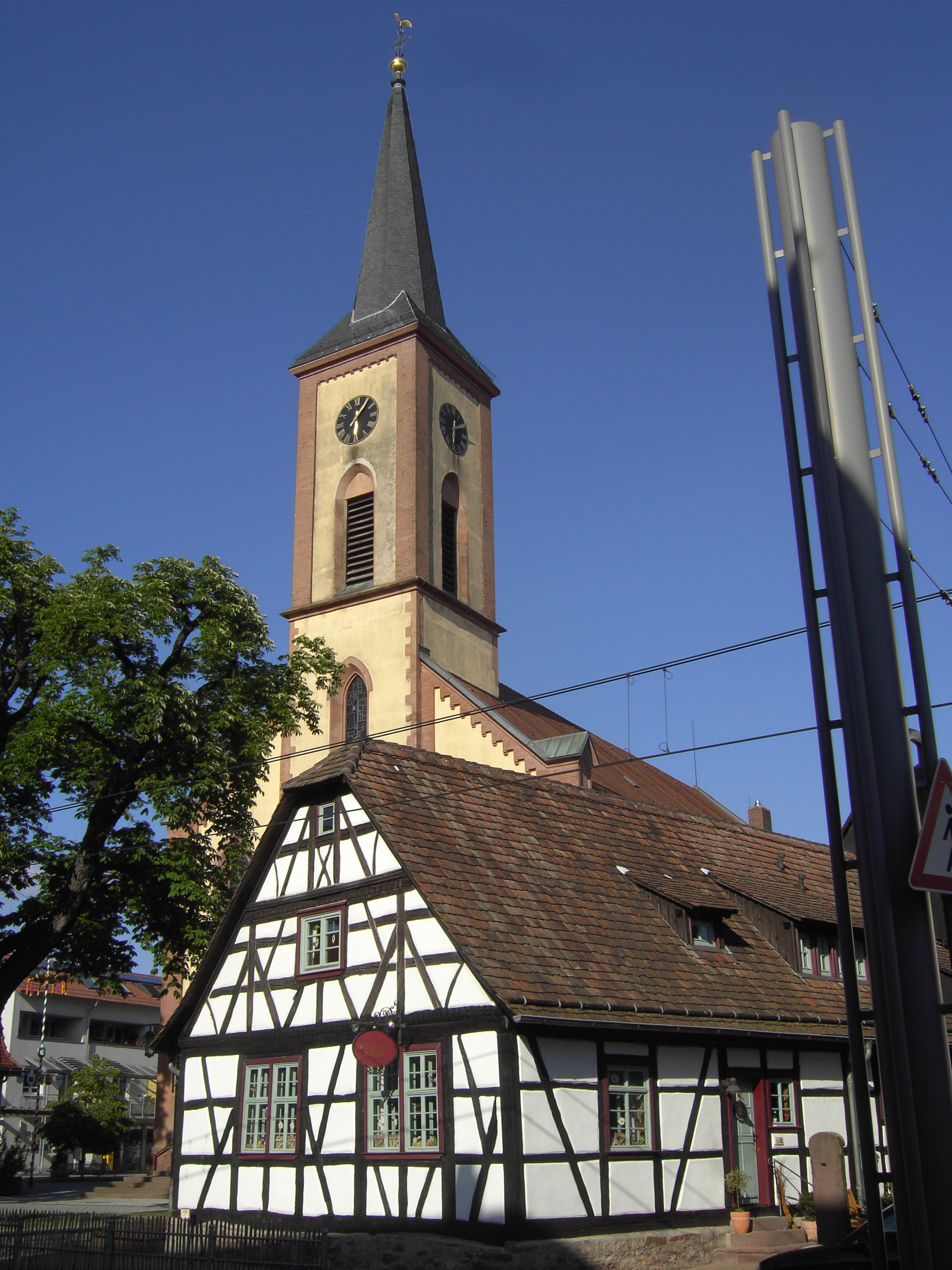
"Hermannshäusle" and the Protestant Church (Michaeliskirche) at Blankenloch

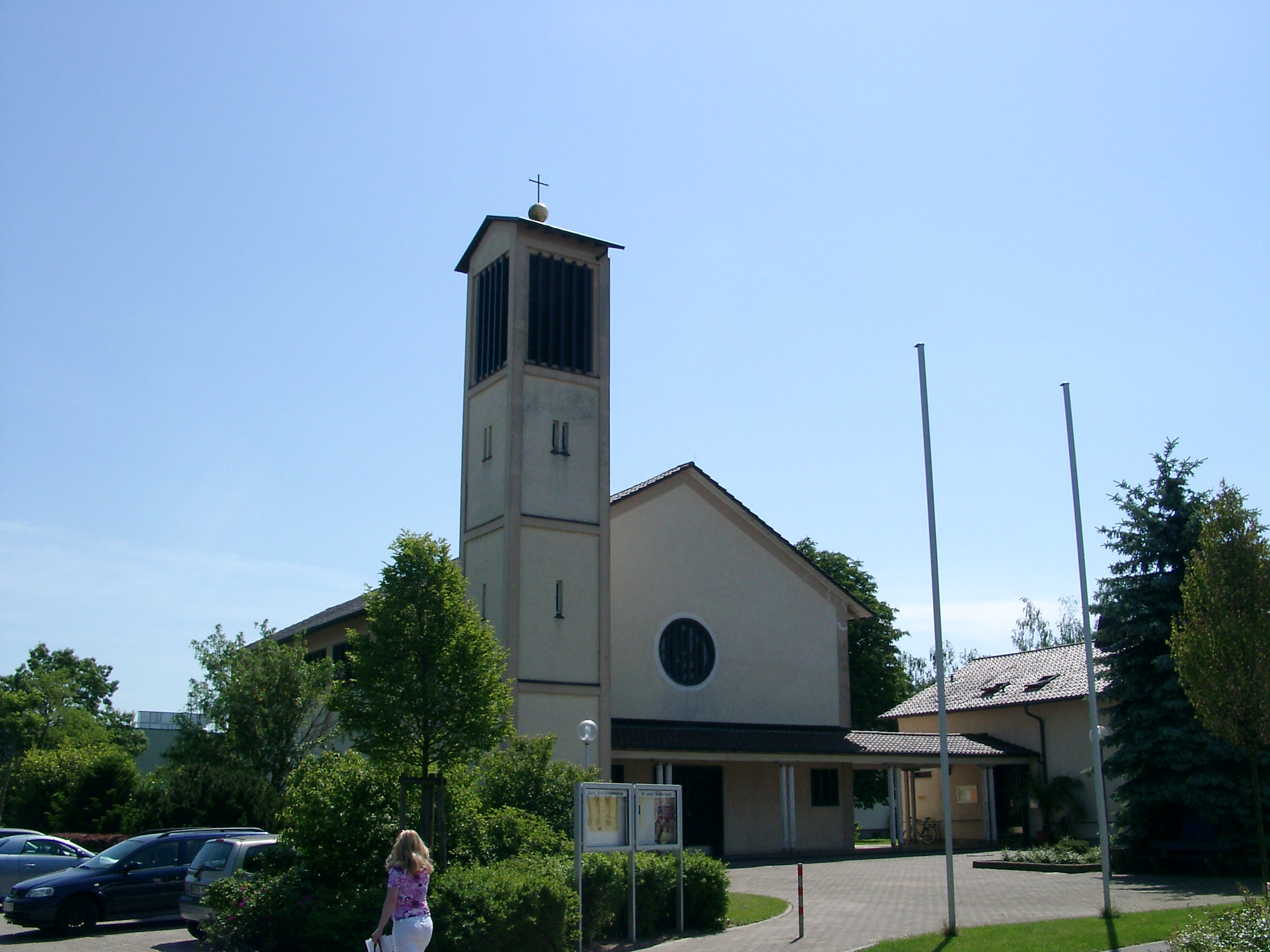
Catholic Church at Blankenloch

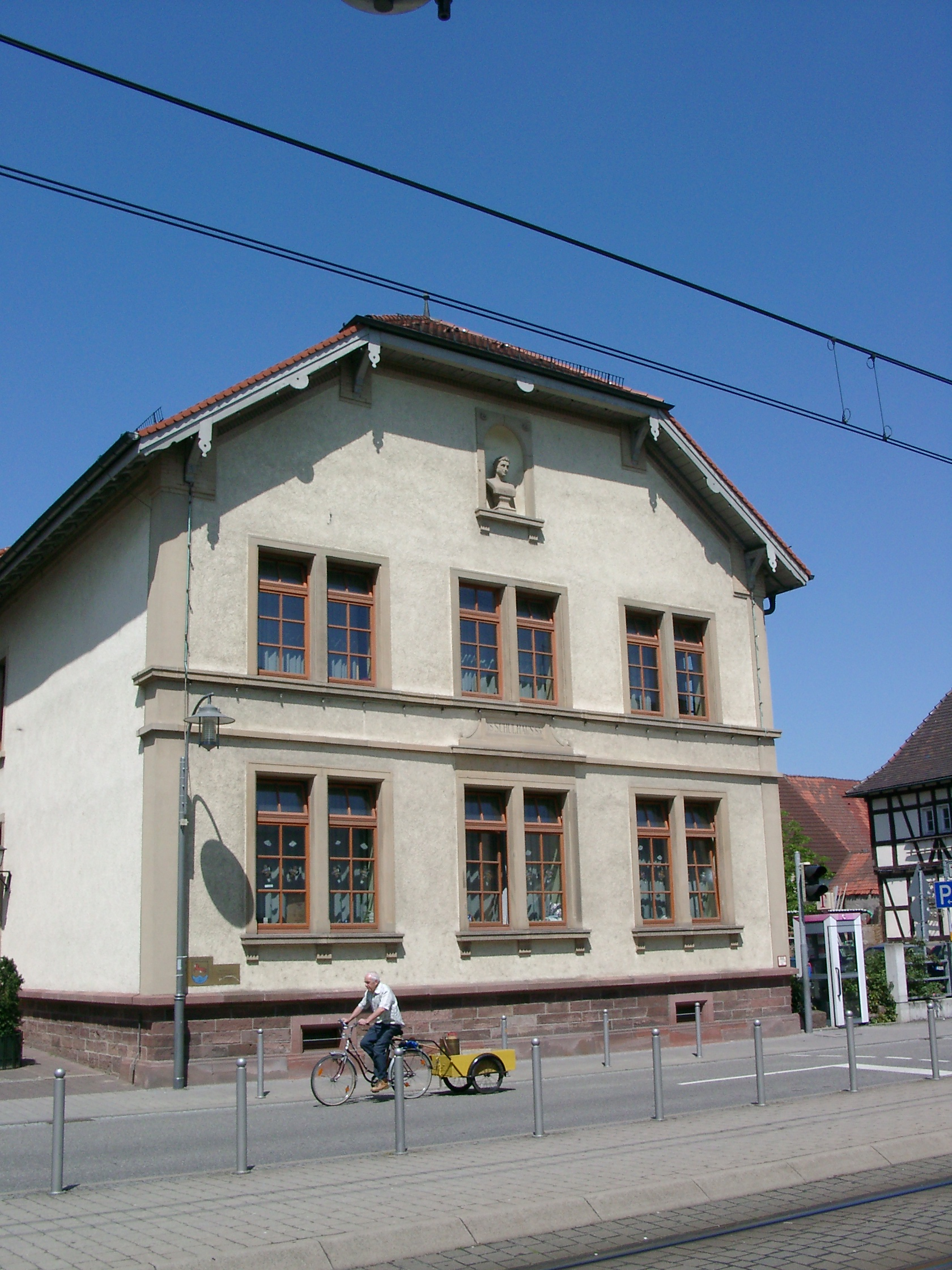
Old Schoolhouse at Blankenloch

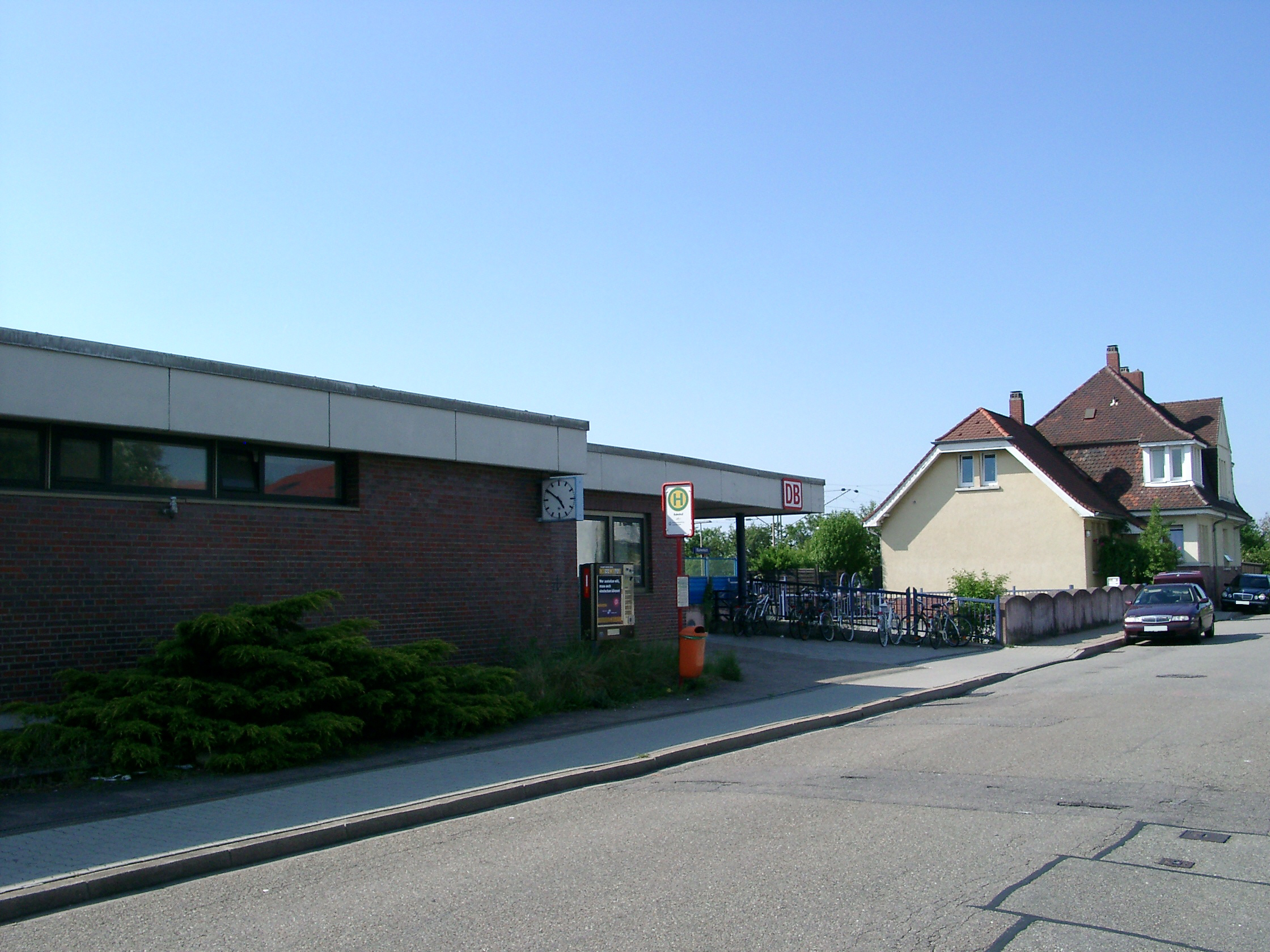
Railway station at Blankenloch

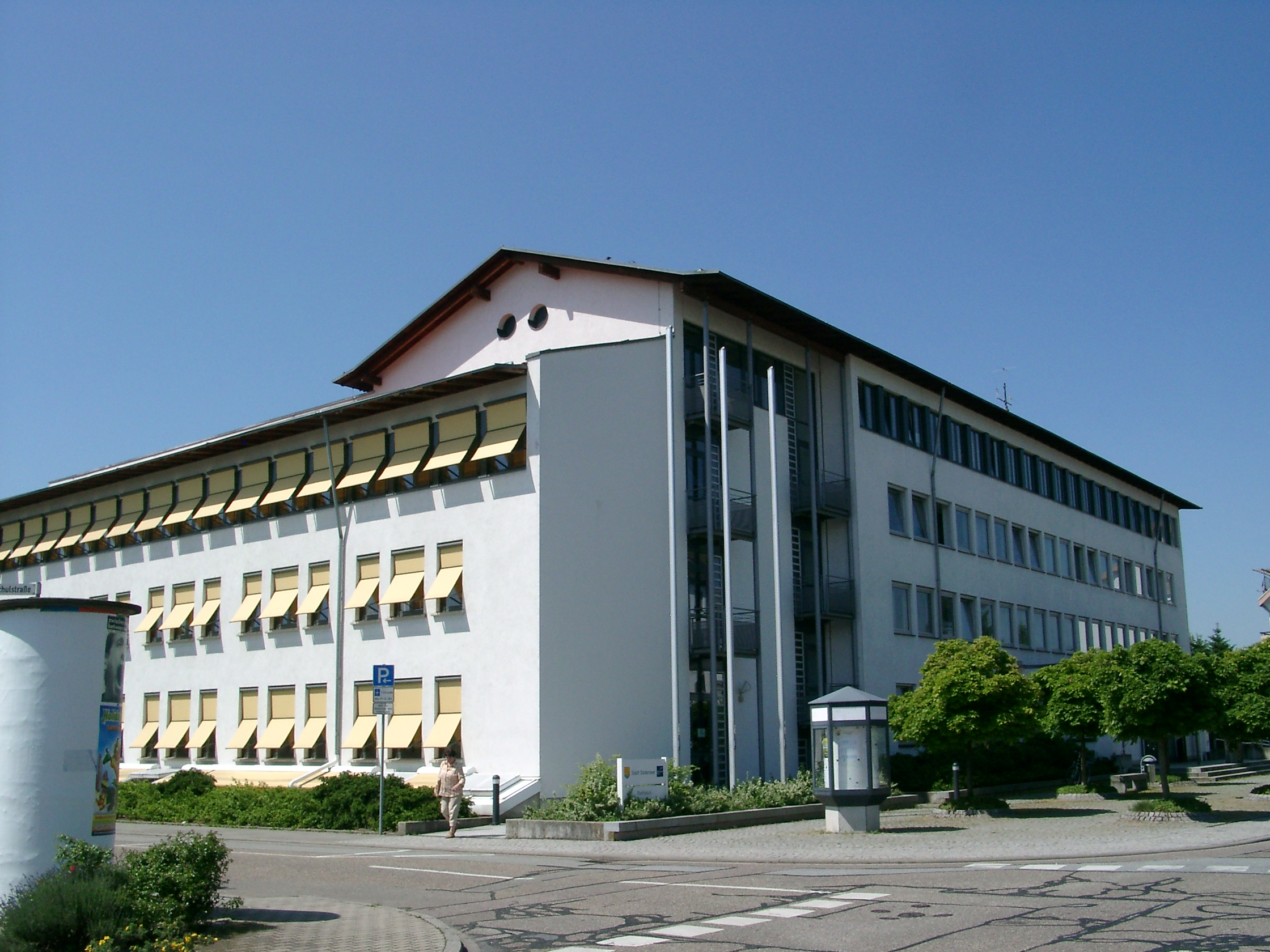
City Hall

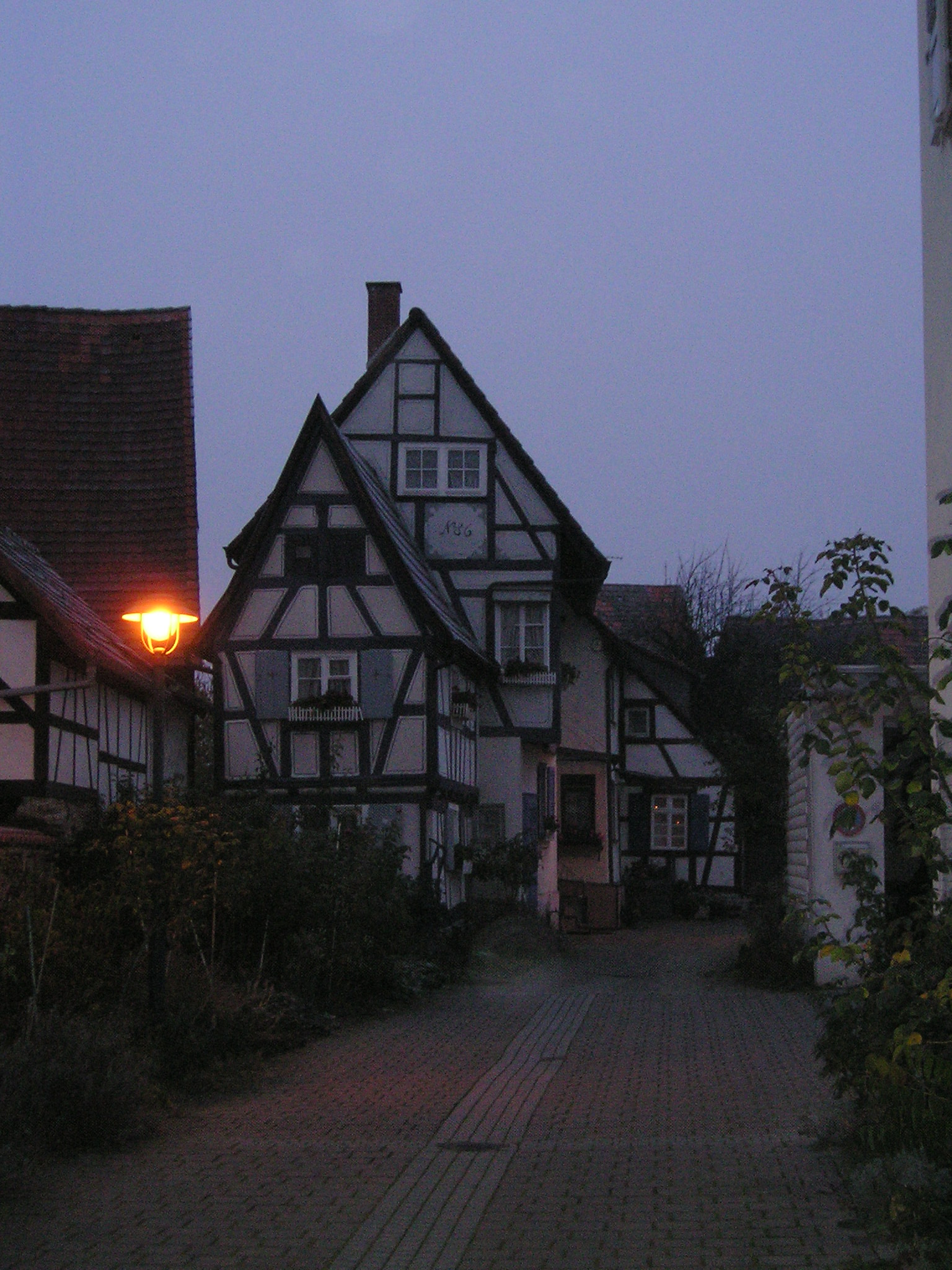
Rathausgaessle Blankenloch

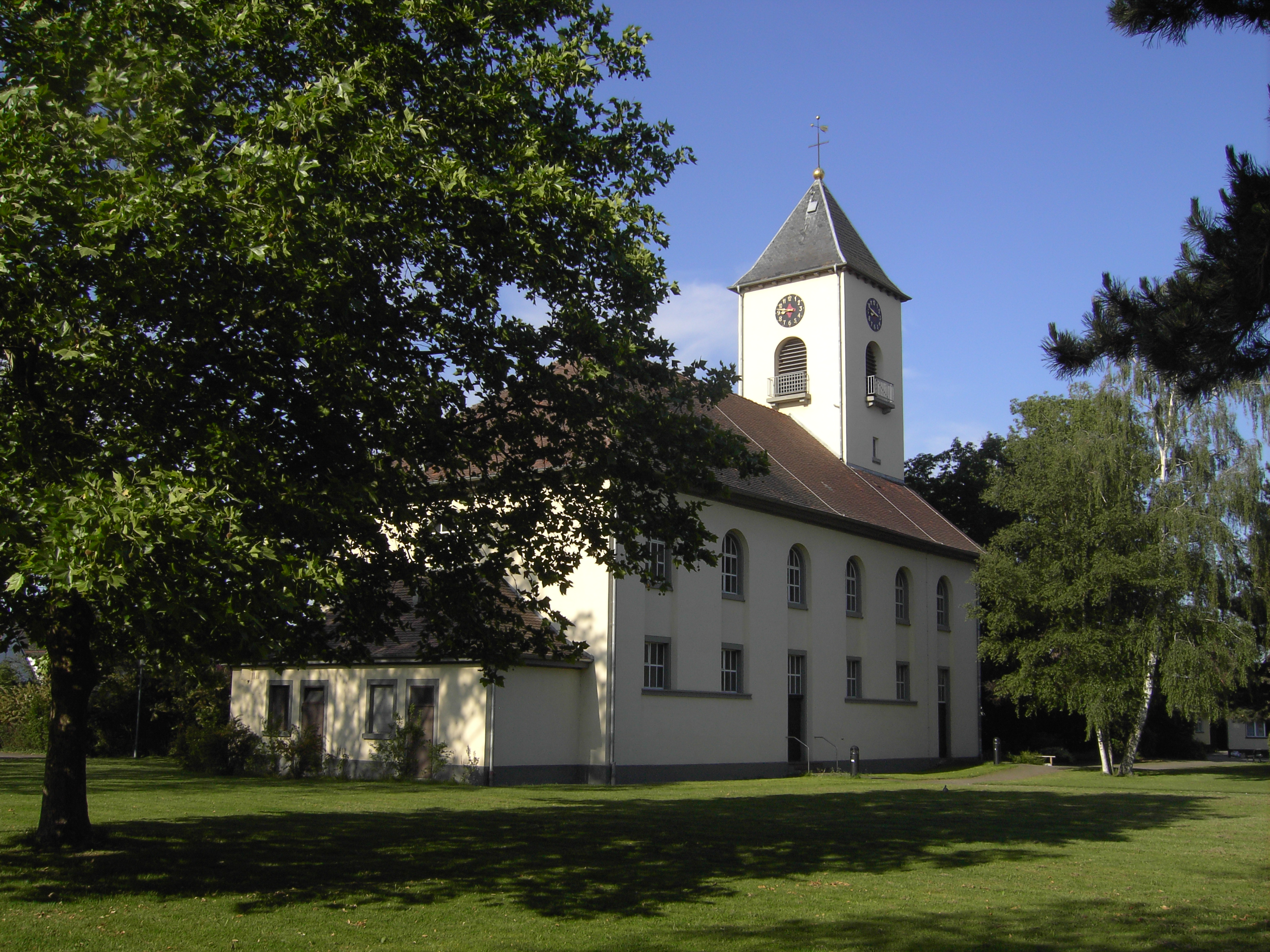
Protestant Church at Friedrichstal

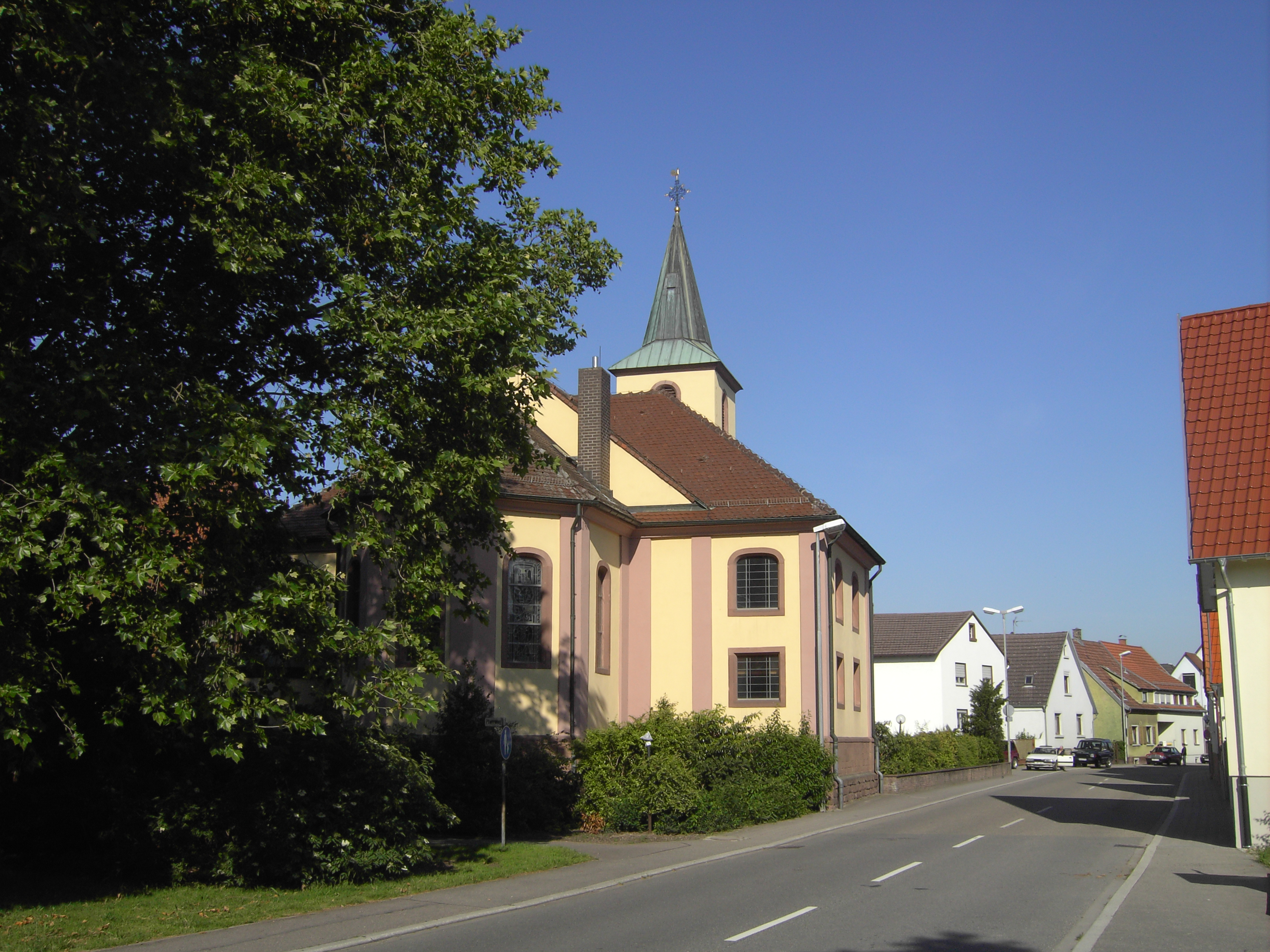
Protestant Church at Spöck

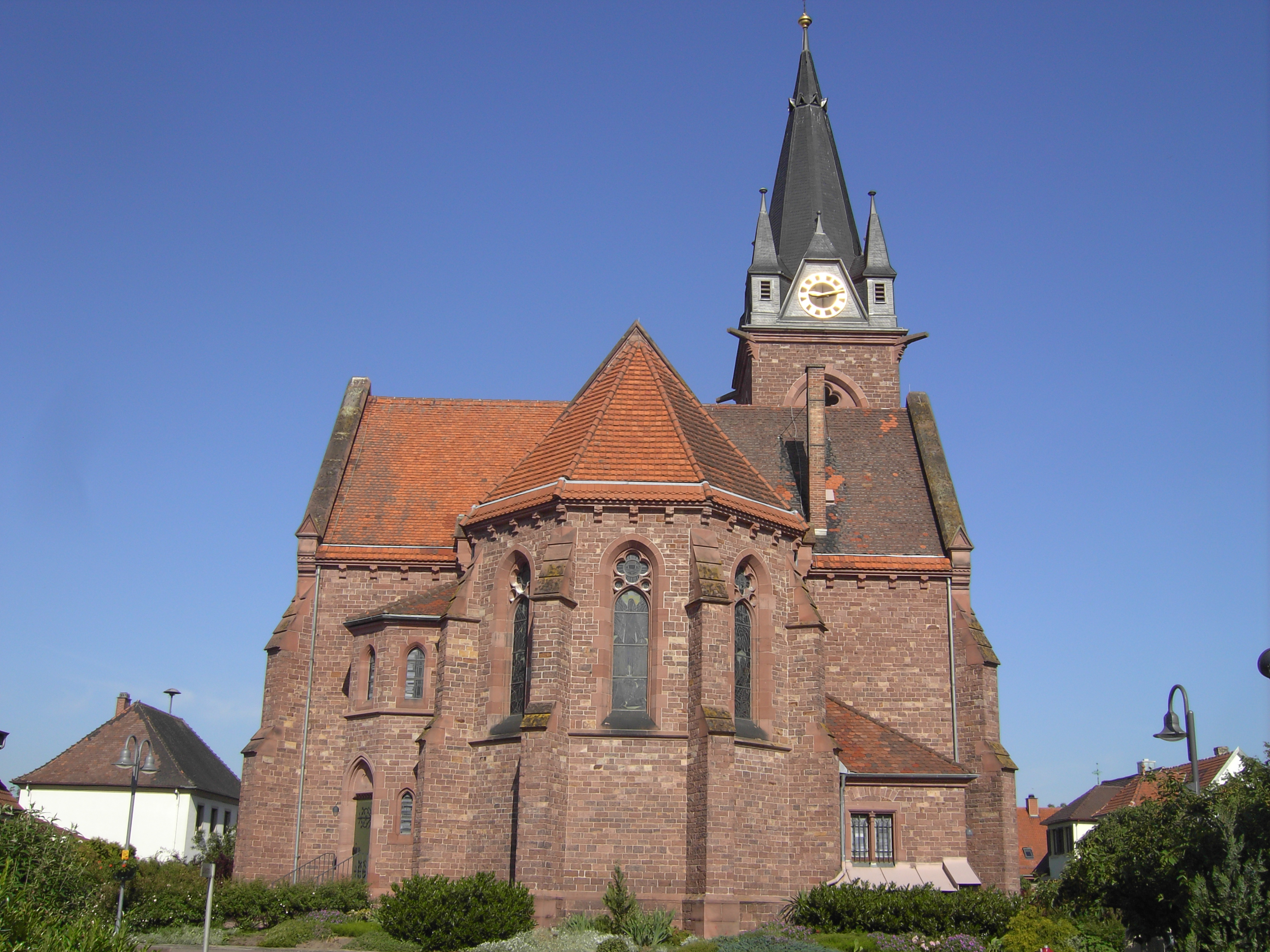
Protestant Church at Staffort

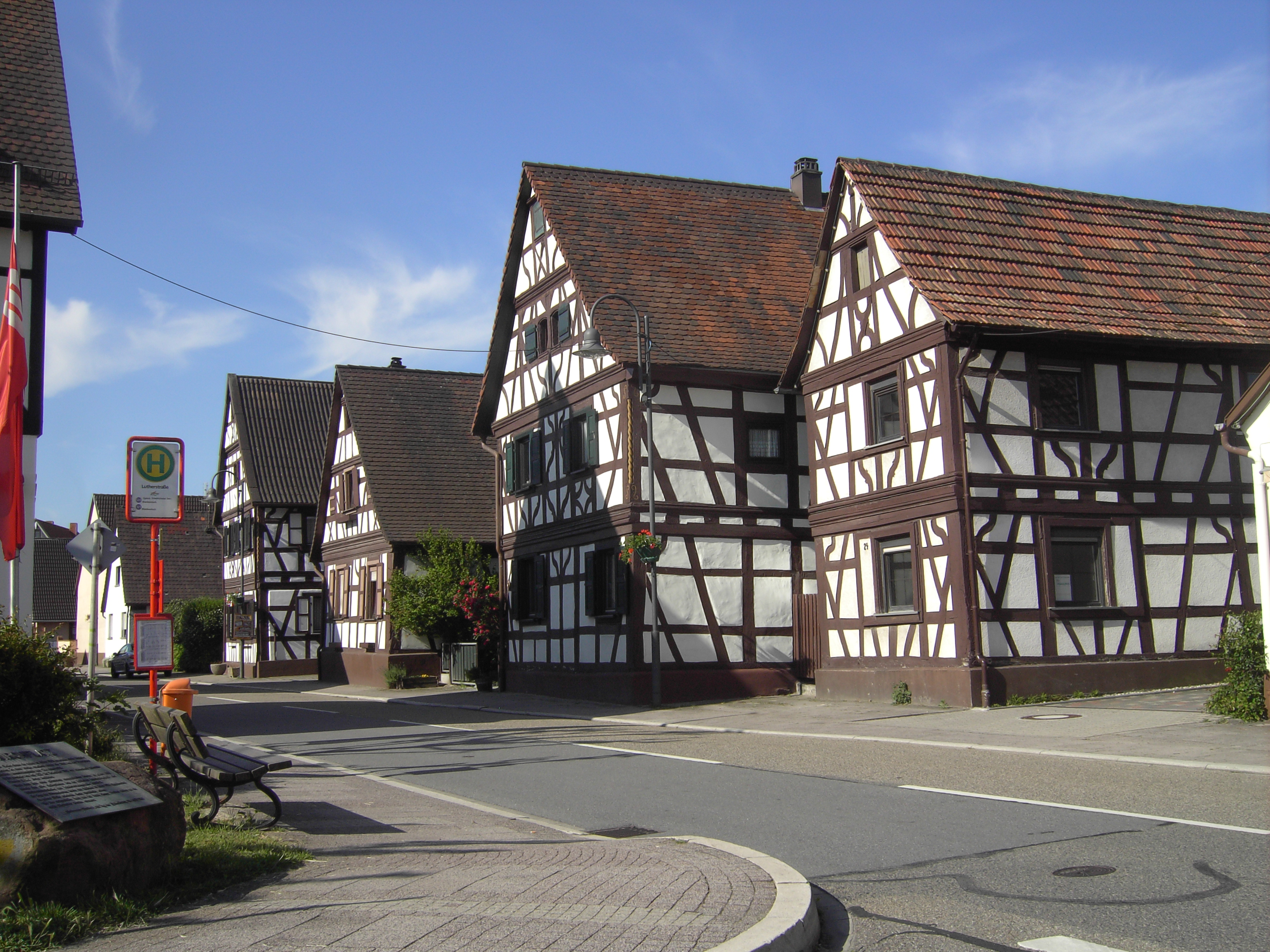
Timber framing houses at Staffort
