= Germania Brötzingen =

German football club

- Full name: Fuβball-Club Germania e.V. Pforzheim-Brötzingen
- Founded: 1906
- Dissolved: 30 June 2011
- 2010–11: Kreisliga Pforzheim (VIII), 2nd

Germania Brötzingen was a German association football club from the district of Brötzingen in Pforzheim, Baden-Württemberg. Together with the 1. FC Pforzheim and VfR Pforzheim, it was one of three clubs in the city who have played higher league football.

On 1 July 2011, the club merged with 1. FC Eutingen to form SV Kickers Pforzheim, with the new side playing in the tier seven Landesliga.

== History ==
The club was established in December 1906 as Fuβball-Club Germania Brötzingen. In 1913, it was merged briefly with Ballspielclub 05 Brötzingen as BC Germania Pforzheim, but the union quickly fell apart. Following World War I, in 1920, several clubs including Turnverein Brötzingen, KSV Achilles Brötzingen, and Radfahrclub Sturm Brötzingen joined with FC to create the current club.

FC enjoyed a steady string of successes in local play that soon saw the club promoted to the senior regional circuit, the Kreisliga Südwest and then the Bezirksliga Württemberg-Baden, where they took part in qualification for the national playoff round in 1928–29. Following the reorganization of German football under the Third Reich into 16 top flight divisions, Brötzingen became part of the Gauliga Baden. A poor campaign led to the club's demotion after their debut season, but they returned to the Gauliga to play three more seasons between 1935 and 1938.

After World War II, FC became part of the Amateurliga Nordbaden-Süd, later the Amateurliga Baden (II), where they fared poorly through the late 40s and 50s. The side improved in the 60s and enjoyed local title and cup wins on their way to promotion to the Amateurliga Nordbaden (III) in 1968. FC was relegated after a 16th-place result there in 1971 and returned to the Bezirksliga (VIII) level.

Spending its final four seasons at Kreisliga level, where the side achieved a second-place finish in 2011, the club eventually disappeared through a merger with 1. FC Eutingen to form SV Kickers Pforzheim on 1 July 2011.

== Honours ==
- Bezirksliga Württemberg-Baden (I)
  - Champions: 1929

== Recent seasons ==
The recent season-by-season performance of the club:

Season	Division	Tier	Position
2002–03	Landesliga Mittelbaden	VI	9th
2003–04	Landesliga Mittelbaden	VI	10th
2004–05	Landesliga Mittelbaden	VI	7th
2005–06	Landesliga Mittelbaden	VI	11th
2006–07	Landesliga Mittelbaden	VI	14th ↓
2007–08	Kreisliga Pforzheim	VII	4th
2008–09	Kreisliga Pforzheim	VIII	7th
2009–10	Kreisliga Pforzheim	VIII	4th
2010–11	Kreisliga Pforzheim	VIII	2nd

- With the introduction of the Regionalligas in 1994 and the 3. Liga in 2008 as the new third tier, below the 2. Bundesliga, all leagues below dropped one tier.

↑ Promoted	↓ Relegated

== International players ==
Theodor Burkhardt, appeared for the national side in 1930, playing one game against the Hungary national football team.
