= German football league system =

Hierarchically interconnected league system for association football in Germany

- Country: Germany
- Sport: Association football
- Promotion and relegation: Yes

National system
- Federation: German Football Association
- Confederation: UEFA
- Top division: Bundesliga (men); Frauen-Bundesliga (women)
- Second division: 2. Bundesliga (men); 2. Frauen-Bundesliga (women)
- Cup competition: Men: DFB Cup; DFL-Supercup; Women: DFB-Pokal Frauen; DFB-Supercup Frauen

Regional systems
- Federations: Northeastern German Football Association; Northern German Football Association; Southern German Football Association; Southwestern Regional Football Association; Western German Football Association

The German football league system, or league pyramid, refers to the hierarchically interconnected league system for association football in Germany that in the 2016–17 season consisted of 2,235 leagues in up to 13 levels having 31,645 teams, in which all divisions are bound together by the principle of promotion and relegation.

The top three professional levels contain one division each. Below this, the semi-professional and amateur levels have progressively more parallel divisions, which each cover progressively smaller geographic areas. Teams that finish at the top of their division at the end of each season can rise higher in the pyramid, while those that finish at the bottom find themselves sinking further down. Therefore, in theory, it is possible for even the lowest local amateur club to rise to the top of the system and become German football champions one day. The number of teams promoted and relegated between the divisions varies, and promotion to the upper levels of the pyramid is usually contingent on meeting additional criteria, especially concerning appropriate facilities and finances.

== Structure ==
The German football league system is held under the jurisdiction of the nationwide German Football Association and its professional body German Football League, along with its five regional associations and their 21 state associations.

On top of the system sits the level one 1. Bundesliga and the level two 2. Bundesliga, both organized by the professional German Football League. The two top flights are then followed by the level three 3. Liga, the lowest full professional division in Germany, organised by the German Football Association itself.

The professional level four Regionalliga is divided into 5 regional divisions, these typically organised by one or two of the five regional associations of the German Football association, these being the Northern German Football Association, the Northeastern German Football Association, the Western German Football Association, the Southwestern Regional Football Association and the Southern German Football Association. For Bavaria, the Bavarian Football Association, a member state association of the Southern German Football Association, runs their top division under their own jurisdiction.

Starting at level five, the various fully amateur divisions are usually governed by the 21 state associations. For the North East German Football Association and Southwestern Regional Football Association, both regional bodies still run the level five divisions under their jurisdiction. Their state member associations' pyramids therefore start at level six.

Level	Division				
	Professional Leagues				
1	1. Bundesliga; 18 teams; ↓ 2 relegation spots + 1 relegation play-off spot				
2	2. Bundesliga; 18 teams; ↑ 2 promotion spots + 1 promotion play-off spot ↓ 2 relegation spots + 1 relegation play-off spot				
3	3. Liga; 20 teams; ↑ 2 promotion spots + 1 promotion play-off spot ↓ 4 relegation spots				
	Non-Professional Leagues				
4	Regionalliga Nord; 18 teams ↑ 1 promotion spot or promotion play-off spot ↓ 2 to 4 relegation spots	Regionalliga Nordost; 18 teams ↑ 1 promotion spot or promotion play-off spot ↓ 1 to 5 relegation spots	Regionalliga West; 18 teams ↑ 1 promotion spot ↓ 1 to 4 relegation spots	Regionalliga Südwest; 18 teams ↑ 1 promotion spot ↓ 3 to 6 relegation spots	Regionalliga Bayern; 20 teams ↑ 1 promotion spot or promotion play-off spot ↓ 2 to 4 relegation spots + 2 relegation play-off spots
5	Hamburg state league system ↑ 1 promotion playoff spot Bremen state league system ↑ 1 promotion playoff spot Schleswig-Holstein state league system ↑ 1 promotion playoff spot Lower Saxony state league system ↑ 1 promotion spot + 1 promotion playoff spot	2 divisions of NOFV-Oberliga; 33 teams ↑ 2 promotion spots ↓ 5 to 11 relegation spots	Lower Rhine state league system ↑ 1 promotion spot Middle Rhine state league system ↑ 1 promotion spot Westphalia state league system ↑ 2 promotion spots	Oberliga Rheinland-Pfalz/Saar; 19 teams ↑ 1 to 2 promotion spots ↓ 3 to 6 relegation spots Oberliga Baden-Württemberg; 18 teams ↑ 1 promotion spot ↓ 3 to 6 relegation spots Hesse state league system ↑ 1 promotion spot	2 divisions in Bavaria state league system ↑ 2 promotion spots + 2 promotion playoff spots
6		Mecklenburg-Western Pomerania state league system ↑ 1 promotion spot Brandenburg state league system ↑ 1 promotion spot Berlin state league system ↑ 1 promotion spot Saxony-Anhalt state league system ↑ 1 promotion spot Thuringia state league system ↑ 1 promotion spot Saxony state league system ↑ 1 to 2 promotion spots		Rhineland state league system ↑ 1 promotion spot to Oberliga Rheinland-Pfalz/Saar Saarland state league system ↑ 1 promotion spot to Oberliga Rheinland-Pfalz/Saar Southwest state league system ↑ 1 promotion spot to Oberliga Rheinland-Pfalz/Saar Baden state league system ↑ 1 promotion spot + 1 promotion playoff spot to Oberliga Baden-Württemberg South Baden state league system ↑ 1 promotion spot + 1 promotion playoff spot to Oberliga Baden-Württemberg Württemberg state league system ↑ 1 promotion spot + 1 promotion playoff spot to Oberliga Baden-Württemberg	

== Federal association league system ==
After each season, the winners of the Bundesliga are crowned German football champions. The bottom two Bundesliga teams are relegated to 2. Bundesliga, whereas the champion and runner-up of 2. Bundesliga are promoted to the top flight. Additionally, the third-last ranked team of Bundesliga and the third-best ranked team of 2. Bundesliga plays a promotion/relegation playoff for the final spot in the next Bundesliga edition. The bottom two 2. Bundesliga teams are relegated to 3. Liga, whereas the champion and runner-up of 3. Liga are promoted to the second flight. Additionally, the third-last ranked team of 2. Bundesliga and the third-best ranked team of 3. Liga plays a promotion/relegation playoff for the final spot in the next 2. Bundesliga edition. The bottom four teams of 3. Liga are relegated to Regionalliga.

== Regional association league systems ==
Whereas the professional first three levels of the German football league system each are single division only and are organised by nationwide governing bodies, the semi-professional level four Regionalliga comprises five independent divisions, each run by different regional and/or state associations.

Three regional bodies, being the Northern German Football Association, the North East German Football Association and the Western German Football Association, each run a division under their sole jurisdiction, these being the corresponding Regionalliga Nord, the Regionalliga Nordost and the Regionalliga West. The two regional bodies Southwestern Regional Football Association and Southern German Football Association share the jurisdiction on the Regionalliga Südwest. Finally, the Bavarian Football Association, although being just a subordinate state association to the superior Southern German Football Association, runs the Regionalliga Bayern, by far the largest single state football association in Germany.

As an exception to the regular promotion rules within the German league system, not all champions of each Regionalliga division are granted automatic promotion. Instead only the Regionalliga West and Southwest each provide a fixed direct promotion. Another direct promotion place is assigned according to a rotation principle among the Regionalliga Nord, Nordost, and Bayern champions. The representatives from the remaining two Regionalligen determine the fourth promoted club in two-legged playoffs.

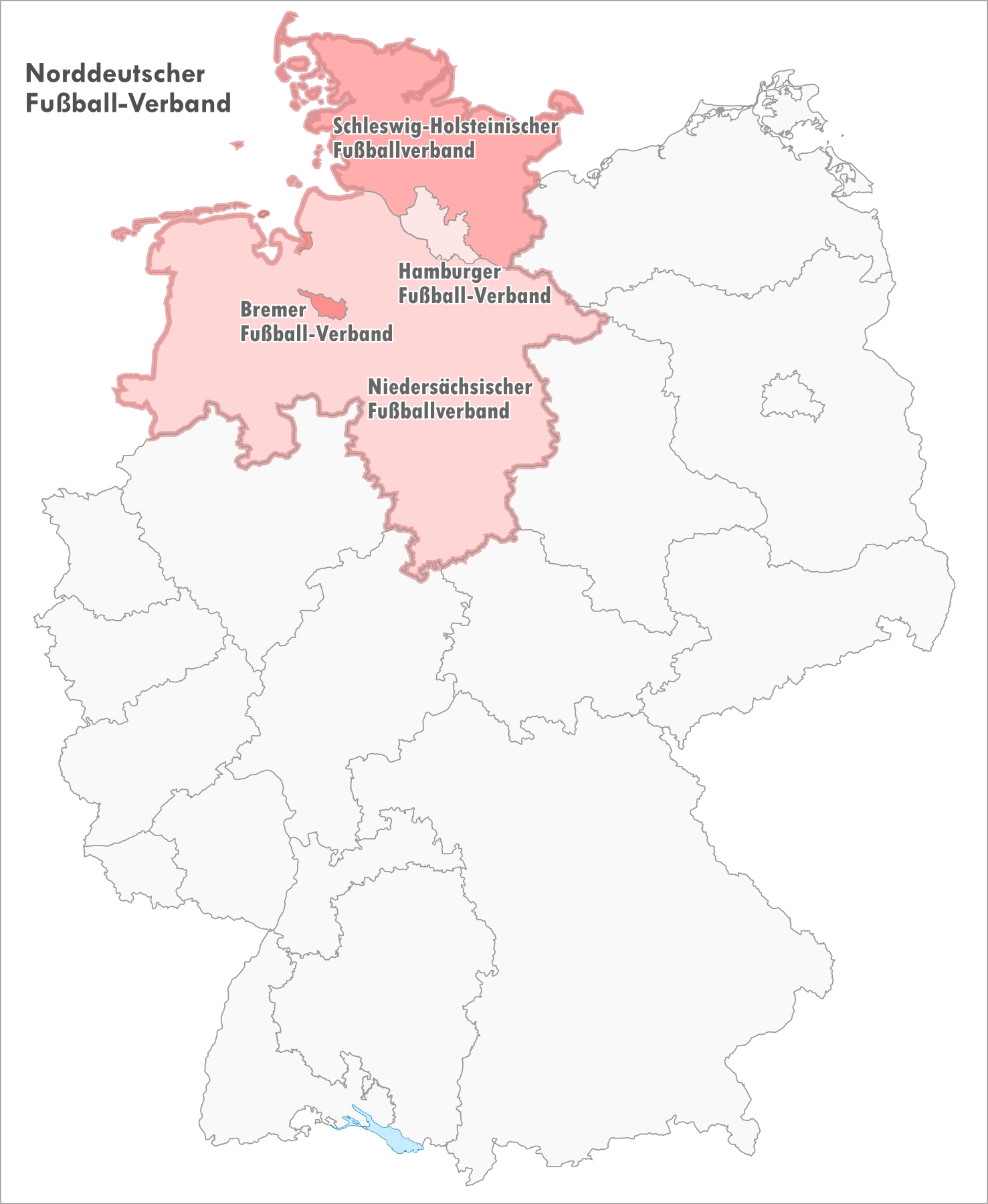
Northern German Football Association

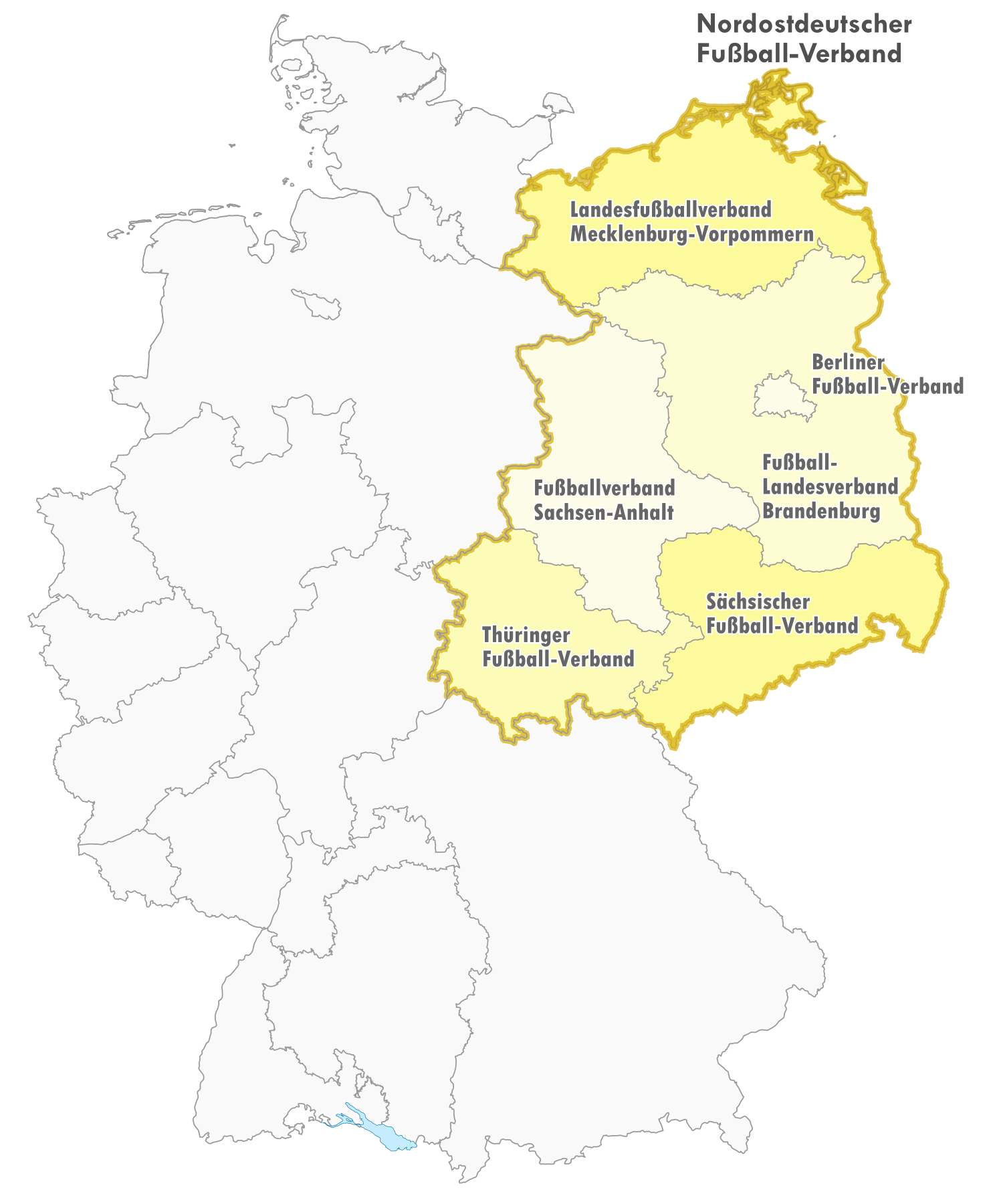
Northeastern German Football Association

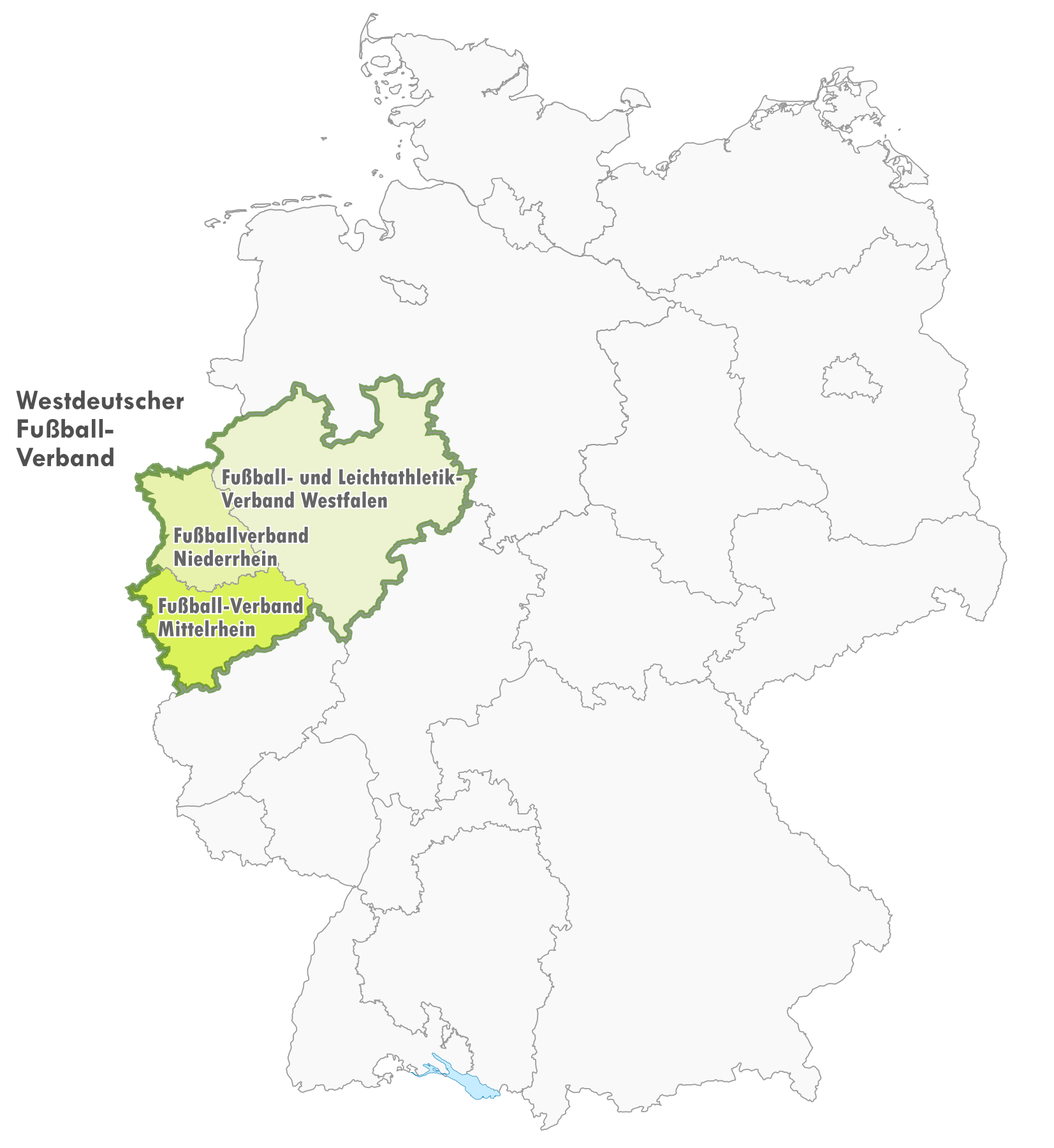
Western German Football Association

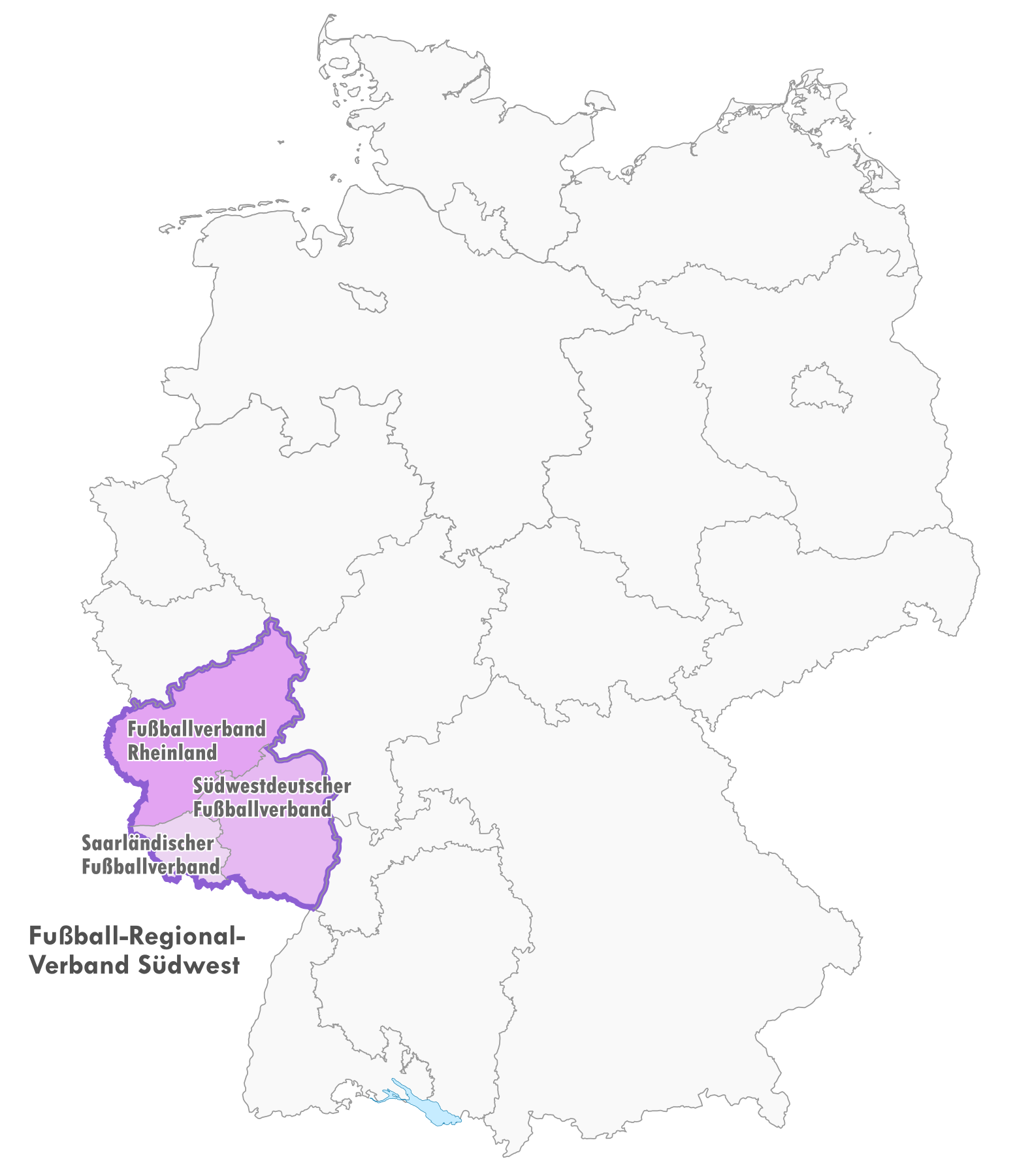
Southwestern Regional Football Association

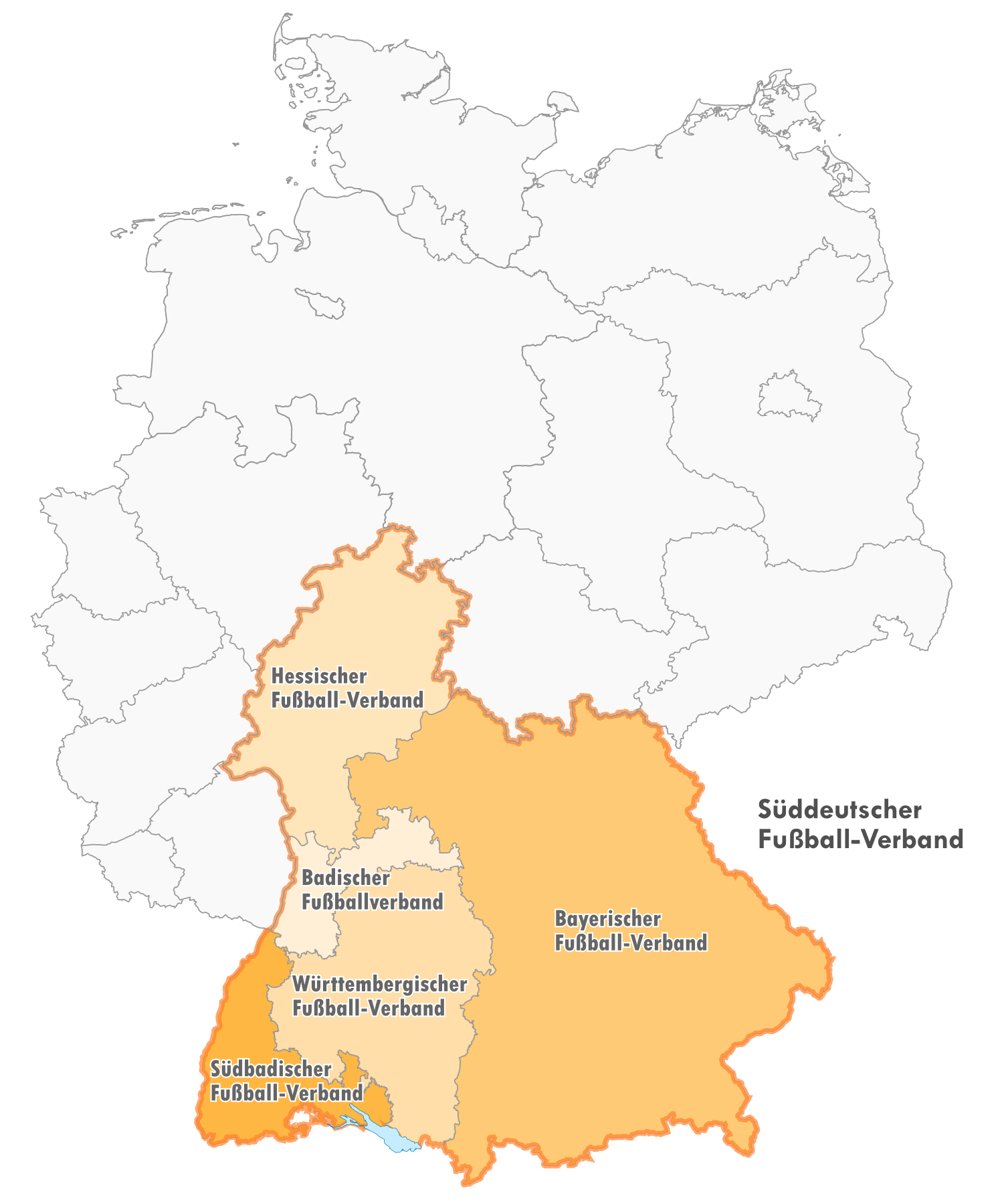
Southern German Football Association

=== Northern Germany ===
The Northern German Football Association league system is the regional association league system in the states of Bremen, Hamburg, Lower Saxony and Schleswig-Holstein and starts at level four of the German league system with the Regionalliga Nord on top. The champions enter a promotion playoff along with the winners of the four other Regionalliga divisions and the Regionalliga Südwest runner-up for three promotions to the 3. Liga.

Below the regional association's league system, the four state association league systems of the Bremen Football Association, the Hamburg Football Association, the Lower Saxony Football Association and the Schleswig-Holstein Football Association work as feeders to the Regionalliga.

=== Northeastern Germany ===
The Northeastern German Football Association league system is the regional association league system in the states of Berlin, Brandenburg, Mecklenburg-Western Pomerania, Saxony, Saxony-Anhalt and Thuringia and starts at level four of the German league system with the Regionalliga Nordost on top. The champions enter a promotion playoff along with the winners of the four other Regionalliga divisions and the Regionalliga Südwest runner-up for three promotions to the 3. Liga.

Below the regional association's league system, the six state association league systems of the Berlin Football Association, the Brandenburg State Football Association, the Mecklenburg-Vorpommern State Football Association, the Saxony Football Association, the Saxony-Anhalt Football Association and the Thuringian Football Association work as feeders to the Oberliga.

=== Western Germany ===
The Western German Football Association league system is the regional association league system in the state of North Rhine-Westphalia and starts at level four of the German league system with the Regionalliga West on top. The champions enter a promotion playoff along with the winners of the four other Regionalliga divisions and the Regionalliga Südwest runner-up for three promotions to the 3. Liga.

Below the regional association's league system, the three state association league systems of the Lower Rhine Football Association, the Middle Rhine Football Association and the Westphalian Football and Athletics Association work as feeders to the Regionalliga.

=== Southwestern Germany ===
The Southwestern Regional Football Association league system is the regional association league system in the states of Rhineland-Palatinate and Saarland and starts at level four of the German league system with the Regionalliga Südwest on top, which is held under joint jurisdiction along with the Southern German Football Association. The champions and the runner-up enter a promotion playoff along with the winners of the four other Regionalliga divisions for three promotions to the 3. Liga. By rule, the champions and the runner-up will not face each other in the promotion playoffs.

Below the regional association's league system, the three state associations league systems of the Rhineland Football Association, the Saarland Football Association and the Southwest German Football Association work as feeders to the Oberliga.

=== Southern Germany ===
The Southern German Football Association league system is the regional association league system in the states of Baden-Württemberg, Bavaria and Hessen and starts at level four of the German league system with the Regionalliga Südwest, which is held under joint jurisdiction along with the Regional Football Association South West respectively with the Regionalliga Bayern. The champions and the runner-up of the Regionalliga Südwest and the champions of the Regionalliga Bayern enter a promotion playoff along with the winners of the three other Regionalliga divisions for three promotions to the 3. Liga.

Below the regional association's league system, the five state association league systems of the Baden Football Association, the Bavarian Football Association, the Hessian Football Association, the South Baden Football Association and the Württembergian Football Association work as feeders to the Regionalliga.

== State association league systems ==
Mostly in line with the geographical borders of the 16 German states, amateur football is organised by 21 state football associations. Therefore, 13 states, these being Bavaria, Berlin, Brandenburg, Bremen, Hamburg, Hesse, Lower Saxony, Mecklenburg-Western Pomerania, Saarland, Saxony, Saxony-Anhalt, Schleswig-Holstein and Thuringia have a state football association with a jurisdiction covering the whole area of the corresponding political entity.

Three states are subdivided into more than one state football association. The state of North Rhine-Westphalia is subdivided into three state associations, these being Middle Rhine, Lower Rhine and Westphalia. The state of Baden-Württemberg is also subdivided into three state associations, these being Baden, South Baden and Württemberg. Finally, the state of Rhineland-Palatinate is subdivided into two state associations, these being Rhineland and Southwest.

Starting on levels four to six of the German football league system, each of these 21 state associations runs a league pyramid under its own jurisdiction. The state association of Bavaria starts its pyramid at level four. The top divisions of the state associations of Bremen, Hamburg, Hesse, Middle Rhine, Lower Rhine, Lower Saxony, Schleswig-Holstein and Westphalia sit at level five of the pyramid. The pyramids of the remaining associations of Baden, Berlin, Brandenburg, Mecklenburg-Western Pomerania, Rhineland, Saarland, Saxony, Saxony-Anhalt, South Baden, Southwest, Thuringia and Württemberg start at level six of the German football league system.

All state associations have full jurisdiction over their league pyramids, though the configuration varies in between states. A traditional state league pyramid had a Verbandsliga (Association League) as its top flight, followed by several divisions of Landesliga (State League). Due to many structural reforms in the last decades, both on federal level and on state levels, this structure has become more indeterminate. Currently, eight of the 21 state associations (Bremen, Hamburg, Hesse, Middle Rhine, Lower Rhine, Lower Saxony, Schleswig-Holstein and Westphalia) have an Oberliga (English: Premier League) as their top amateur state division, some followed by a Verbandsliga, some directly by a Landesliga. Starting in 2012, the state association of Bavaria organized its own Regionalliga (Regional League), a league formerly only organized by the superior regional associations.

With the exception of Berlin and Hamburg, all other state associations usually supervise several county and/or district associations. The county associations usually cover the area of a government district, whereas the district associations have jurisdiction for the territory of an urban district. The associations of Bavaria, Bremen, Lower Saxony and the Southwest are initially subdivided into several county associations, the latter are then subdivided into district associations. The associations of South Baden and Württemberg have several county associations following in the league system, but no district associations. The remaining associations (Baden, Brandenburg, Hesse, Lower Rhine, Mecklenburg-Western Pomerania, Middle Rhine, Rhineland, Saarland, Saxony, Saxony-Anhalt, Schleswig-Holstein, Thuringia and Westphalia) are directly subdivided into district associations. The county associations usually run a single division, the Bezirksliga (County League) under their jurisdiction, then followed by the district associations' top flights Kreisliga (District League). State associations that are directly subdivided into district associations, typically run the Bezirksliga themselves. In Hesse, the Bezirksliga is called the Gruppenliga (Group League).

=== Northern Germany ===
==== Schleswig-Holstein ====
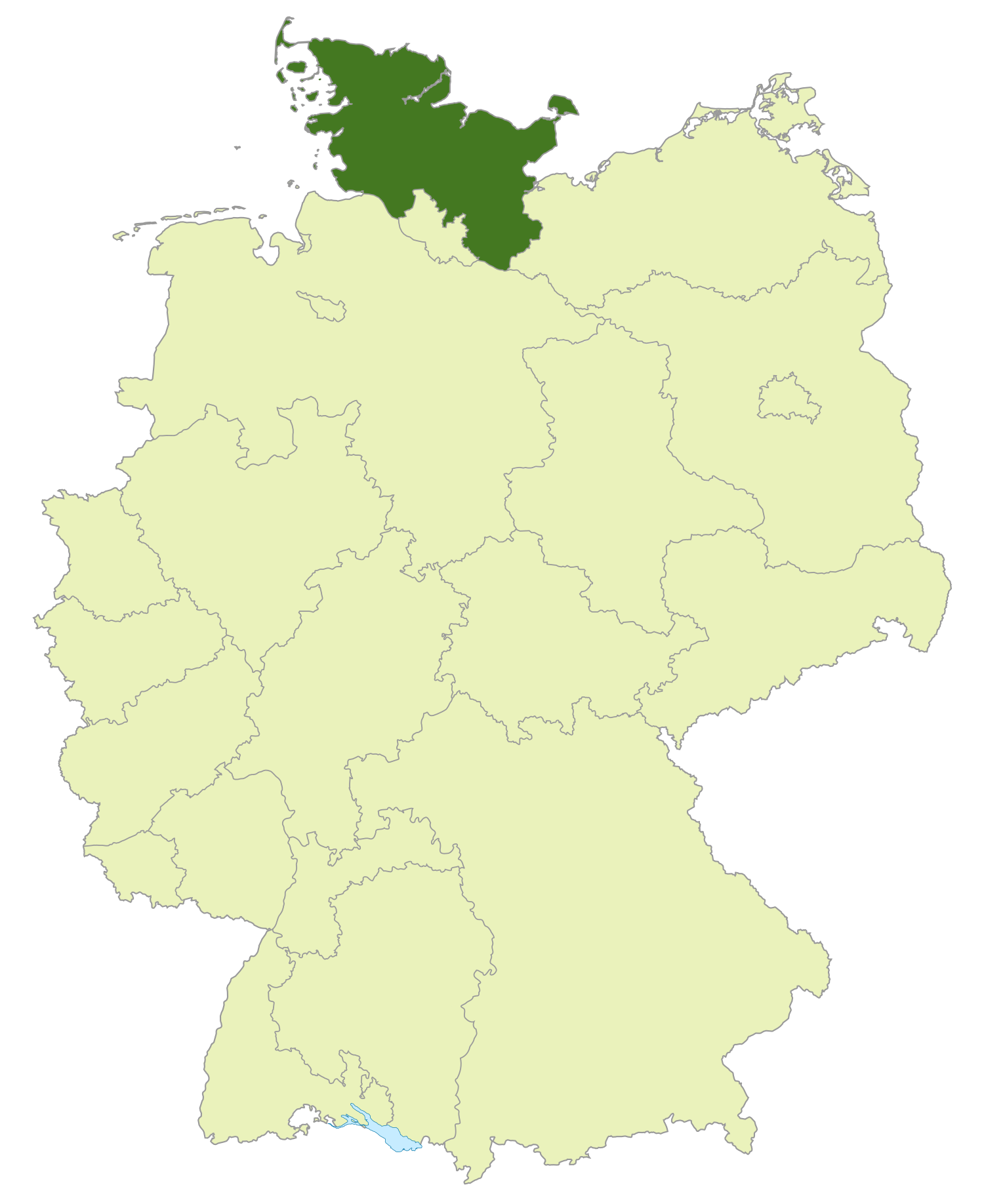
Schleswig-Holstein Football Association

The Schleswig-Holstein Football Association league system is the state association league system in the state of Schleswig-Holstein and starts at level five of the German league system with the Oberliga Schleswig-Holstein on top. The current (2016–17 season) champions are Eutin 08. The champions enter a promotion playoff along with the Bremen-Liga champions, the Oberliga Hamburg champions and the Niedersachsenliga runner-up for two promotions to the Regionalliga Nord.

Below the state association league system 12 district associations work as feeders to the Verbandsliga. In the 2017–18 season, the full system comprises 61 divisions having 861 teams. Additionally, four teams play above the state association league system: Holstein Kiel (2. Bundesliga), Eutin 08, SC Weiche Flensburg 08 and VfB Lübeck (all Regionalliga Nord).

Level	Division
	↑ 1 promotion playoff spot to Regionalliga Nord
5	Oberliga Schleswig-Holstein – 16 teams
6	2 divisions of Landesliga – 32 teams
7	4 divisions of Verbandsliga – 64 teams
	↓ relegation to Kiel, Herzogtum Lauenburg, Lübeck, Neumünster, Nordfriesland, Ostholstein, Plön, Rendsburg-Eckernförde, Schleswig-Flensburg, Segeberg, Stormarn or Westküste (Dithmarschen-Steinburg) district FA league systems
8	8 divisions of Kreisliga – 128 teams
9	12 divisions of Kreisklasse A – 168 teams
10	16 divisions of Kreisklasse B – 224 teams
11	18 divisions of Kreisklasse C – 229 teams

==== Hamburg ====
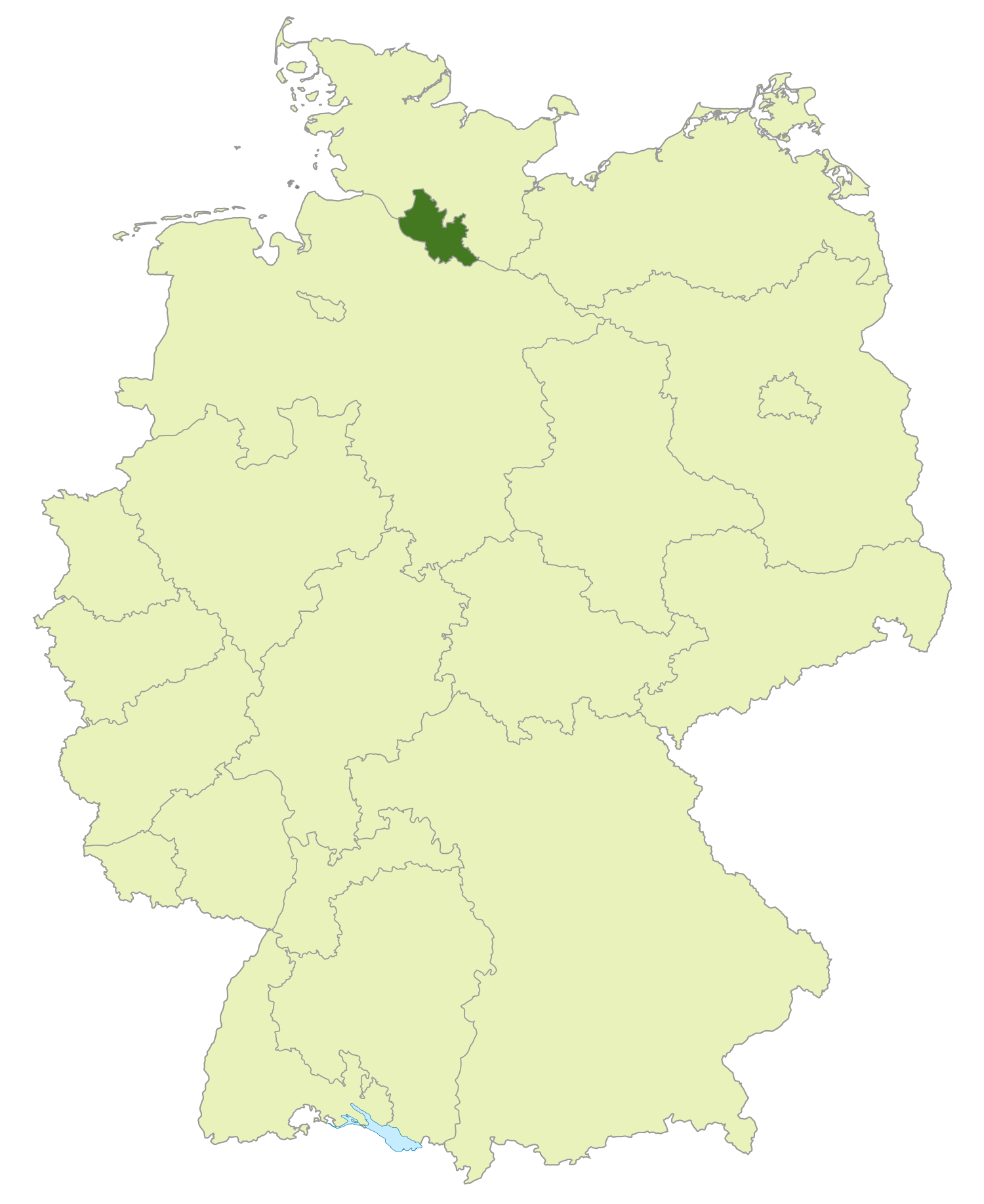
Hamburg Football Association

The Hamburg Football Association league system is the state association league system in the state of Hamburg and parts of southern Schleswig-Holstein and northeastern Lower Saxony and it starts at level five of the German league system with the Oberliga Hamburg on top. The 2021–22 season champions were TuS Dassendorf. The champions enter a promotion playoff along with the Bremen-Liga champions, the Oberliga Schleswig-Holstein champions and the Niedersachsenliga runner-up for two promotions to the Regionalliga Nord.

As the state of Hamburg consists only of the city of Hamburg itself, there are no local associations below. In the 2016–17 season, the full system comprises 30 divisions having 453 teams. Additionally, six teams play above the state association league system: Hamburger SV (Bundesliga), FC St. Pauli (2. Bundesliga), Altona 93, Hamburger SV II, FC St. Pauli II and FC Eintracht Norderstedt 03 (all Regionalliga Nord).

Level	Division
	↑ 1 promotion playoff spot to Regionalliga Nord
5	Oberliga Hamburg – 18 teams
6	2 divisions of Landesliga – 32 teams
7	4 divisions of Bezirksliga – 63 teams
8	8 divisions of Kreisliga – 120 teams
9	8 divisions of Kreisklasse A – 122 teams
10	7 divisions of Kreisklasse B – 98 teams

==== Lower Saxony ====
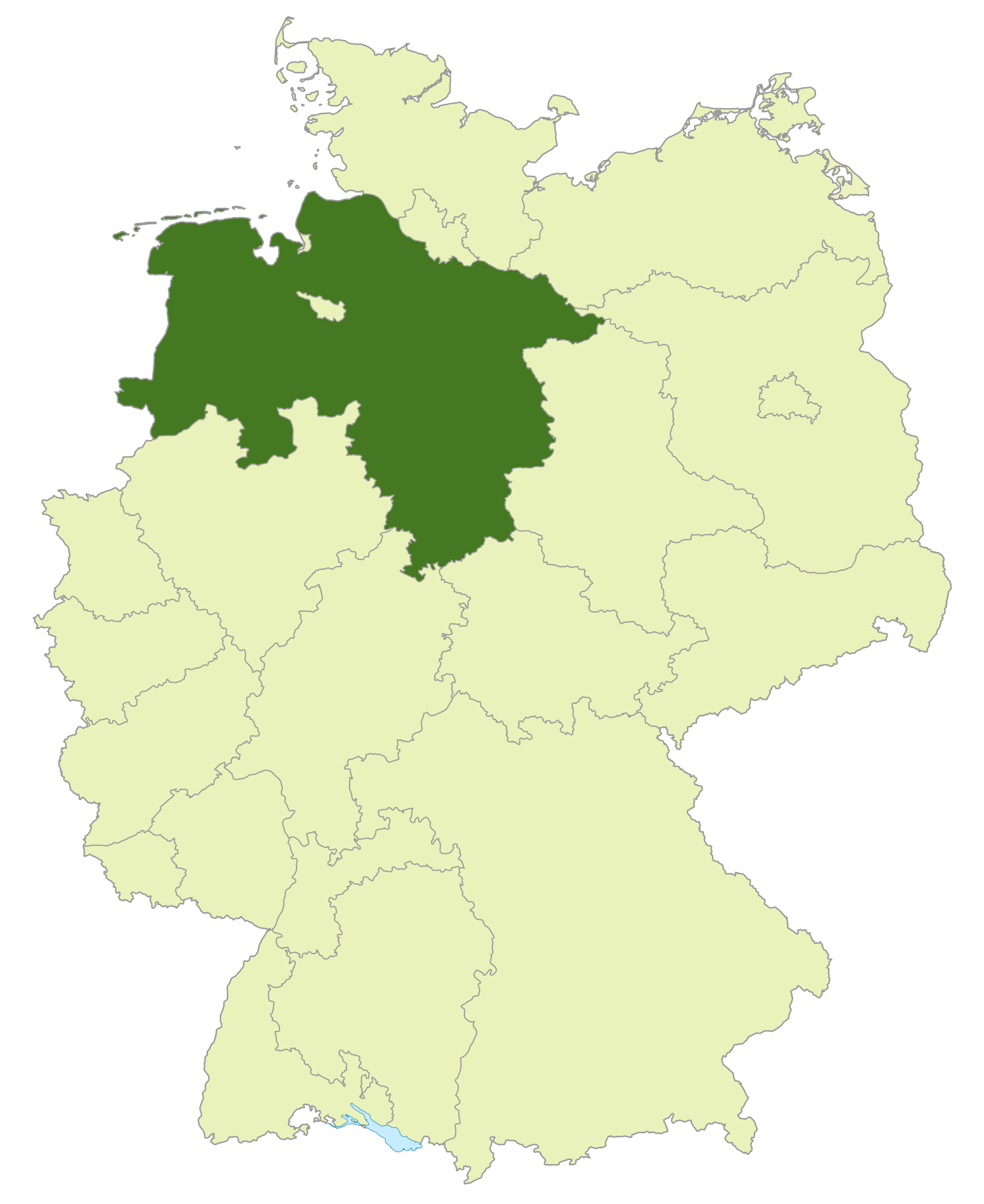
Lower Saxony Football Association

The Lower Saxony Football Association league system is the state association league system in the state of Lower Saxony and starts at level five of the German league system with the Niedersachsenliga on top. The current (2016–17 season) champions are SSV Jeddeloh. The champions are directly promoted to Regionalliga Nord, whereas the runner-up enters a promotion playoff along with the Bremen-Liga champions and the Oberliga Hamburg champions and the Oberliga Schleswig-Holstein champions for two additional promotions.

Below the state association league system four county associations and following them 43 district associations work as feeders to the Oberliga. In the 2016–17 season, the full system comprises 295 divisions having 4,022 teams. Additionally, 16 teams play above the state association league system: Hannover 96 and VfL Wolfsburg (Bundesliga), Eintracht Braunschweig (2. Bundesliga), SV Meppen and VfL Osnabrück (3. Liga), Lüneburger SK Hansa, TSV Havelse, VfL Wolfsburg II, Hannover 96 II, 1. FC Germania Egestorf/Langreder, Schwarz-Weiß Rehden, VfB Oldenburg, SSV Jeddeloh, SV Drochtersen/Assel, VfV 06 Hildesheim and Eintracht Braunschweig II (all Regionalliga Nord).

Level	Division
	↑ 1 promotion spot + 1 promotion playoff spot to Regionalliga Nord
5	Niedersachsenliga – 16 teams
	↓ relegation to Braunschweig, Hanover, Lüneburg or Weser-Ems county FA league systems
6	4 divisions of Landesliga – 68 teams
7	17 divisions of Bezirksliga – 274 teams
	↓ relegation to Ammerland, Aurich, Bentheim, Braunschweig, Celle, Cloppenburg, Cuxhaven, Diepholz, Emden, Emsland, Friesland, Gifhorn, Göttingen-Osterode, Hamelin-Pyrmont, Hanover, Hanover region, Harburg, Heidekreis, Helmstedt, Hildesheim, Holzminden, Leer, Lüchow-Dannenberg, Lüneburg, Nienburg, Nordharz, Northeim-Einbeck, Oldenburg, Oldenburg region/Delmenhorst, Osnabrück, Osnabrück region, Osterholz, Peine, Rotenburg, Schaumburg, Stade, Uelzen, Vechta, Verden, Wesermarsch, Wilhelmshaven, Wittmund or Wolfsburg district FA league systems
8	42 divisions of Kreisliga – 634 teams
9	57 divisions of 1. Kreisklasse – 837 teams
10	65 divisions of 2. Kreisklasse – 879 teams
11	67 divisions of 3. Kreisklasse – 831 teams
12	38 divisions of 4. Kreisklasse – 448 teams
13	4 divisions of 5. Kreisklasse – 35 teams

==== Bremen ====
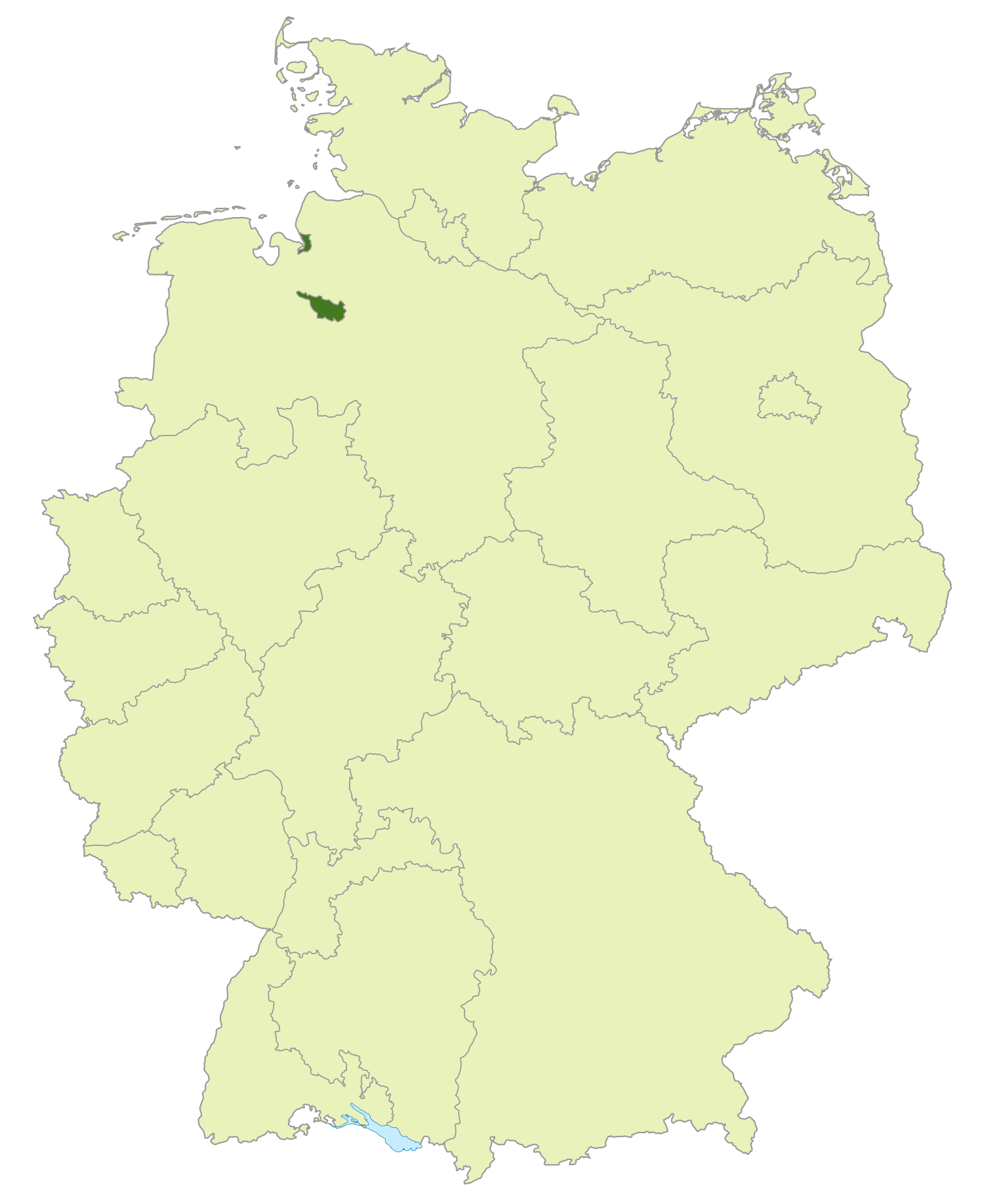
Bremen Football Association

The Bremen Football Association league system is the state association league system in the state of Bremen and starts at level five of the German league system with the Bremen-Liga on top. The current (2016–17 season) champions are Bremer SV. The champions enter a promotion playoff along with the Oberliga Hamburg champions, the Oberliga Schleswig-Holstein champions and the Niedersachsenliga runner-up for two promotions to the Regionalliga Nord.

Below the state association league system one county association and following it two district associations work as feeders to the Landesliga. In the 2016–17 season, the full system comprises 11 divisions having 148 teams. Additionally, two teams play above the state association league system: SV Werder Bremen (Bundesliga) and SV Werder Bremen II (3. Liga).

Level	Division
	↑ 1 promotion playoff spot to Regionalliga Nord
5	Bremen-Liga – 16 teams
6	Landesliga – 16 teams
	↓ relegation to Bremen county FA league systems
7	Bezirksliga – 16 teams
	↓ relegation to Bremen city or Bremerhaven district FA league systems
8	2 divisions of Kreisliga A – 26 teams
9	Kreisliga B – 16 teams
10	Kreisliga C – 16 teams
11	2 divisions of 1. Kreisklasse – 22 teams
12	2. Kreisklasse – 10 teams
13	3. Kreisklasse – 10 teams

=== Northeastern Germany ===
==== Mecklenburg-Western Pomerania ====
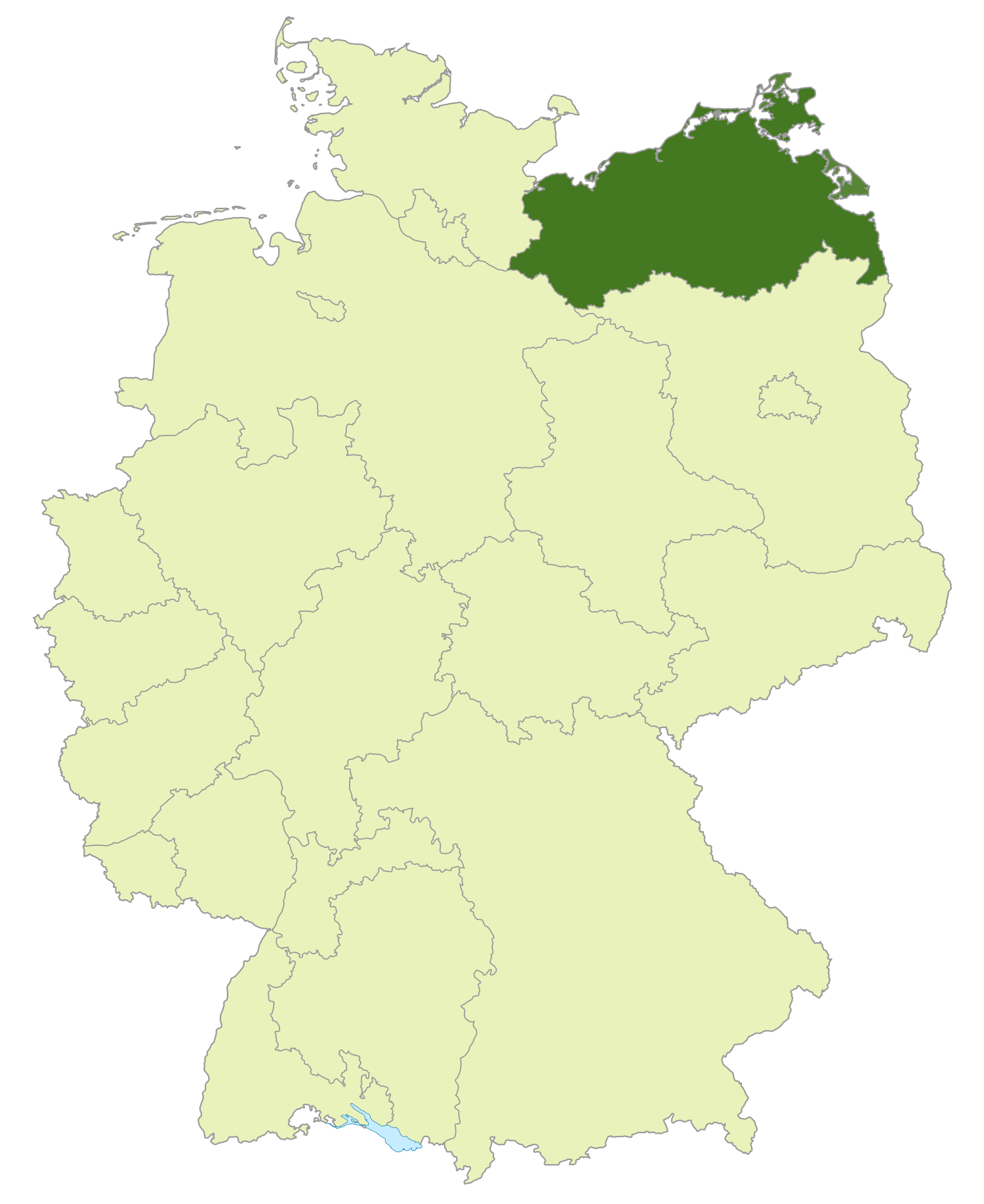
Mecklenburg-Vorpommern State Football Association

The Mecklenburg-Vorpommern State Football Association league system in the state association league systems in the state of Mecklenburg-Western Pomerania and starts at level six of the German league system with the Verbandsliga Mecklenburg-Vorpommern on top. The current (2020–21 season) champions are FC Mecklenburg Schwerin. The champions are directly promoted to Oberliga Nordost.

Below the state association league system six district associations work as feeders to the Landesklasse. In the 2016–17 season, the full system comprises 37 divisions having 487 teams. Additionally, seven teams play above the state association league system: Hansa Rostock (3. Liga), TSG Neustrelitz (Regionalliga Nordost), Hansa Rostock II, FC Anker Wismar, Malchower SV, FC Mecklenburg Schwerin and Torgelower FC Greif (all Oberliga Nordost).

Level	Division
	↑ 1 promotion spot to Oberliga Nordost
6	Verbandsliga Mecklenburg-Vorpommern – 16 teams
7	2 divisions of Landesliga – 32 teams
8	4 divisions of Landesklasse – 64 teams
	↓ relegation to Mecklenburger Seenplatte-Vorpommern, North Vorpommern-Rügen, Schwerin-Northwestern Mecklenburg, Vorpommern-Greifswald, Warnow or West Mecklenburg district FA league systems
9	7 divisions of Kreisoberliga – 94 teams
10	12 divisions of Kreisliga – 147 teams
11	7 divisions of 1. Kreisklasse – 91 teams
12	2. Kreisklasse – 12 teams

==== Brandenburg ====
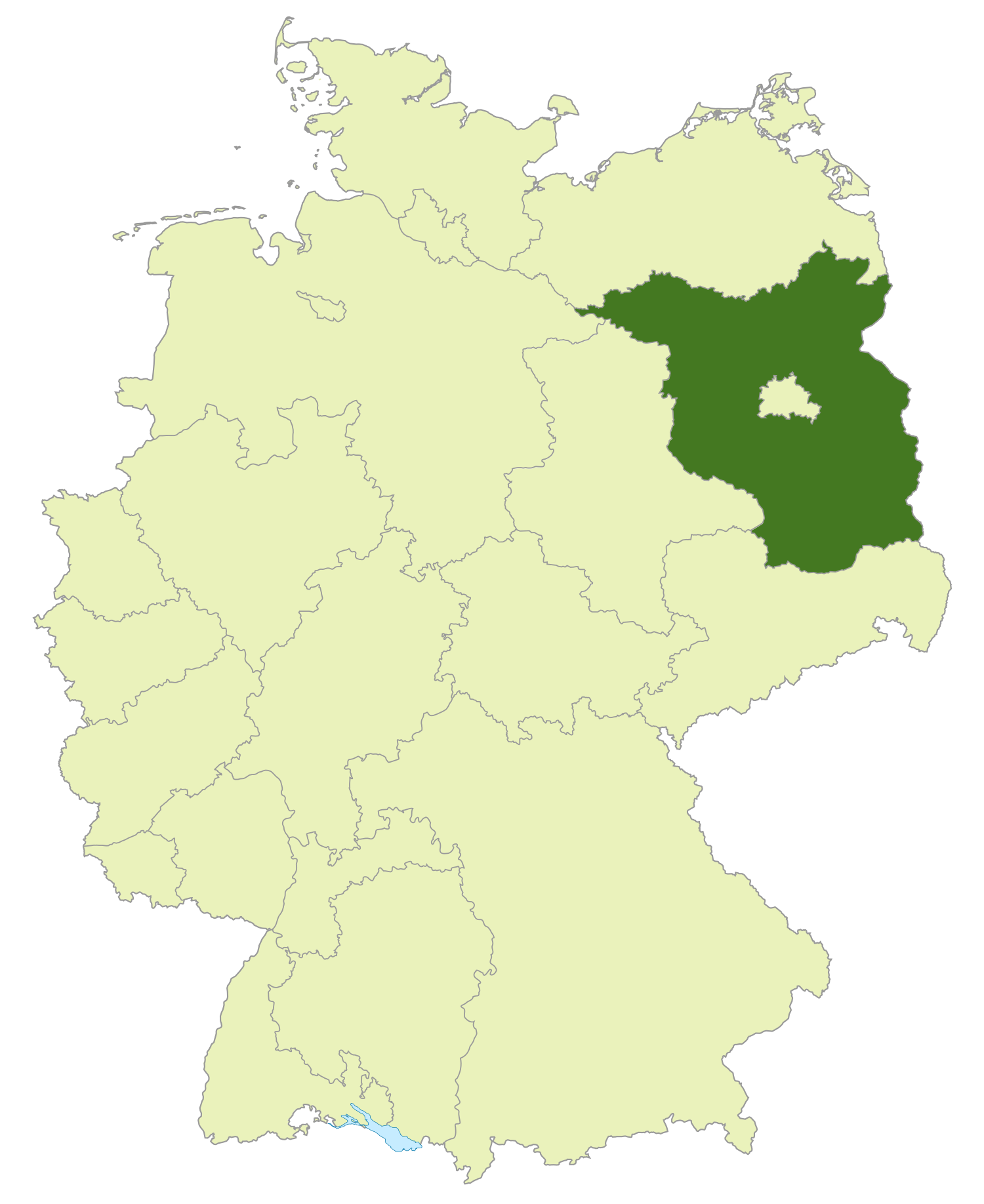
Brandenburg State Football Association

The Brandenburg State Football Association league system is the state association league system in the state of Brandenburg and starts at level six of the German league system with the Brandenburg-Liga on top. The current (2016–17 season) champions are VfB Krieschow. The champions are directly promoted to Oberliga Nordost.

Below the state association league system eight district associations work as feeders to the Landesklasse. In the 2016–17 season, the full system comprises 64 divisions having 871 teams. Additionally, 11 teams play above the state association league system: SV Babelsberg 03, FC Energie Cottbus, FSV 63 Luckenwalde and FSV Union Fürstenwalde (all Regionalliga Nordost), SV Grün-Weiß Brieselang, Brandenburger SC Süd 05, SV Altlüdersdorf, FSV Optik Rathenow, VfB Krieschow, SV Victoria Seelow and FC Strausberg (all Oberliga Nordost).

Level	Division
	↑ 1 promotion spot to Oberliga Nordost
6	Brandenburg-Liga – 16 teams
7	2 divisions of Landesliga – 32 teams
8	4 divisions of Landesklasse – 64 teams
	↓ relegation to Dahme/Flaming, East Brandenburg, Havelland, Lower Lusatia, Oberhavel/Barnim, Prignitz/Ruppin, South Brandenburg or Uckermark district FA league systems
9	8 divisions of Kreisoberliga – 123 teams
10	15 divisions of Kreisliga – 225 teams
11	17 divisions of 1. Kreisklasse – 226 teams
12	17 divisions of 2. Kreisklasse – 185 teams

==== Berlin ====
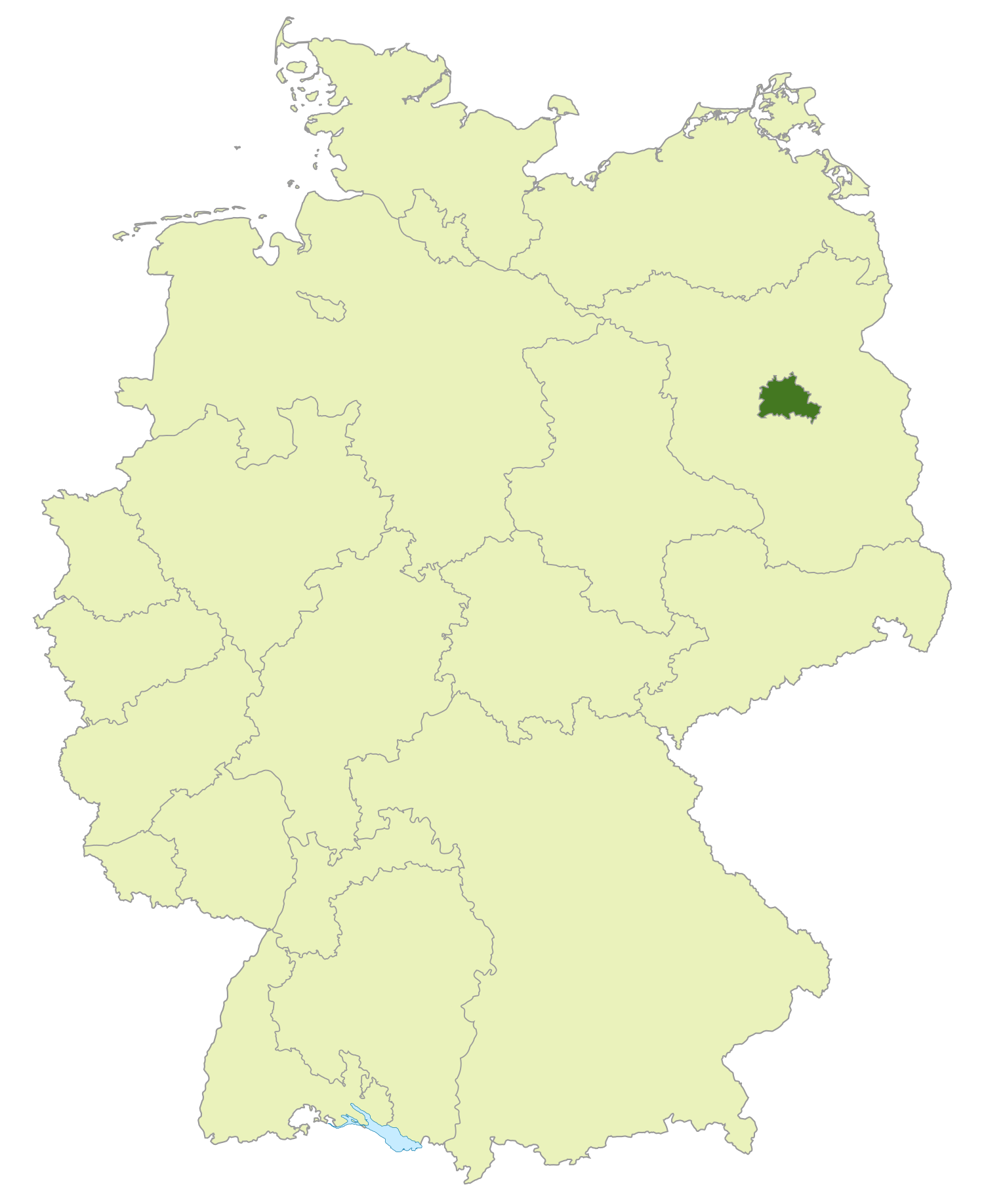
Berlin Football Association

The Berlin Football Association league system is the state association league system in the state of Berlin and starts at level six of the German league system with the Berlin-Liga on top. The current (2022-23 season) champions are SV Sparta Lichtenberg. The champions are directly promoted to NOFV-Oberliga Nord. Within the BFA, main and Reserve teams (Addressed as II, III, IV, V etc.) are allowed to play in the same rank up to Landesliga but will be grouped separate. When the main team is being overtaken by a reserve team by promotion, the teams switch the names for the following season.

As the state of Berlin consists only of the city of Berlin itself, there are no local associations below. The full system comprises 23 divisions having 358 teams. Additionally, as of the 2022-23 season, 15 teams play above the state association league system: 1. FC Union Berlin (Bundesliga), Hertha BSC (2. Bundesliga), Hertha BSC II, VSG Altglienicke, FC Viktoria 1889 Berlin, BFC Dynamo, Berliner AK 07 (Regionalliga Nordost), SV Lichtenberg 47, Tennis Borussia Berlin, FC Hertha 03 Zehlendorf, SC Staaken, SV Tasmania Berlin, CFC Hertha 06, SFC Stern 1900 and SV Sparta Lichtenberg (NOFV-Oberliga Nord)

Level	Division
	↑ 1 promotion spot to NOFV-Oberliga Nord
6	Berlin-Liga – 18 teams
7	2 divisions of Landesliga – 32 teams
8	3 divisions of Bezirksliga – 48 teams
9	4 divisions of Kreisliga A – 64 teams
10	5 divisions of Kreisliga B – 80 teams
11	8 divisions of Kreisliga C – 116 teams

==== Saxony-Anhalt ====
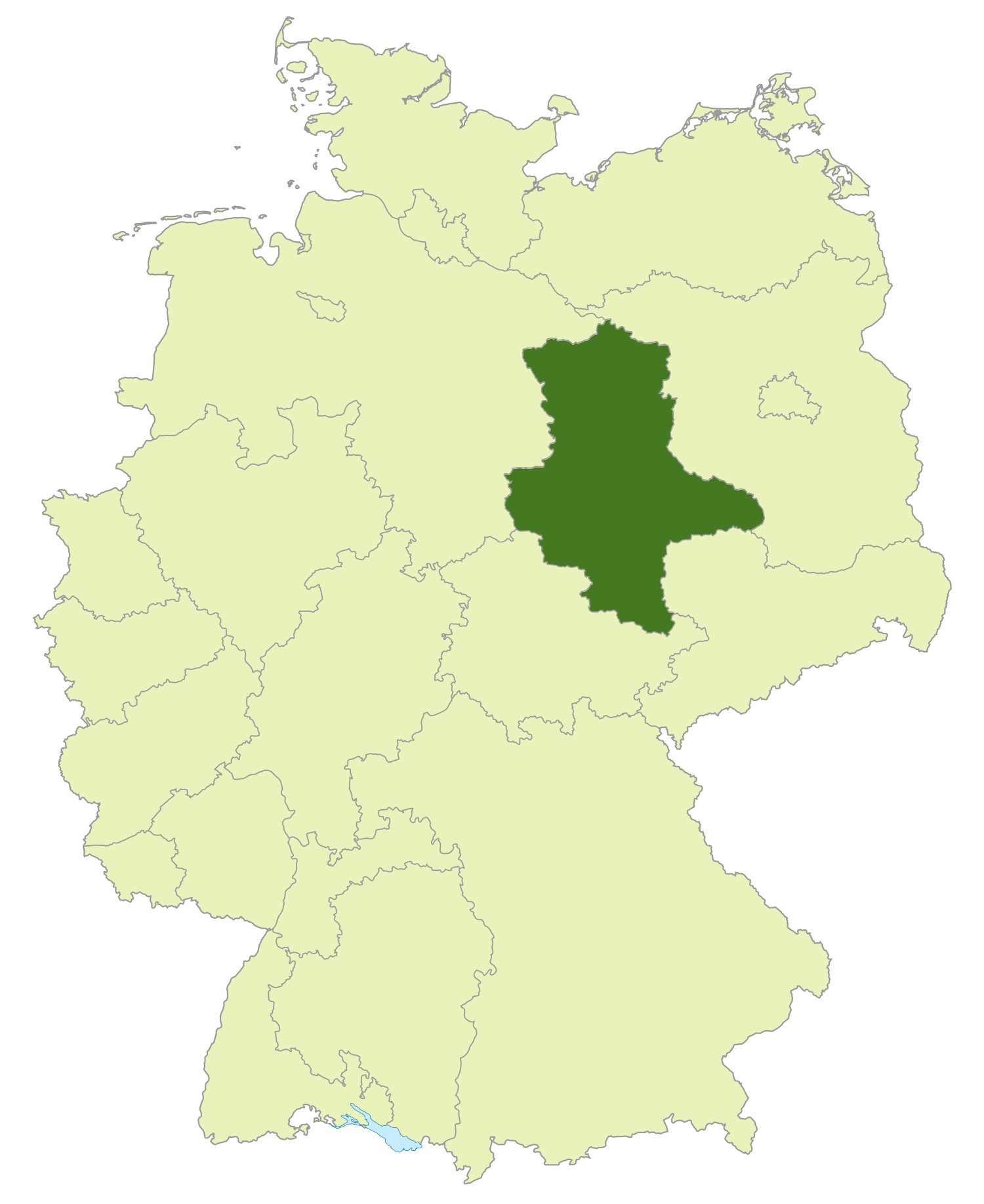
Saxony-Anhalt Football Association

The Saxony-Anhalt Football Association league system is the association league systems in the state of Saxony-Anhalt and starts at level six of the German league system with the Verbandsliga Sachsen-Anhalt on top. The current (2016–17 season) champions are 1. FC Lok Stendal. The champions are directly promoted to Oberliga Nordost.

Below the state association league system 14 district associations work as feeders to the Landesklasse. In the 2016–17 season, the full system comprises 72 divisions having 974 teams. Additionally, eight teams play above the state association league system: 1. FC Magdeburg and Hallescher FC (3. Liga), VfB Germania Halberstadt (Regionalliga Nordost), SV Merseburg 99, VfL Halle 96, Askania Bernburg, Union Sandersdorf and 1. FC Lok Stendal (all Oberliga Nordost).

Level	Division
	↑ 1 promotion spot to Oberliga Nordost
6	Verbandsliga Sachsen-Anhalt – 16 teams
7	2 divisions of Landesliga – 32 teams
8	6 divisions of Landesklasse – 96 teams
	↓ relegation to Altmark East, Altmark West, Anhalt, Anhalt-Bitterfeld, Börde, Burgenland, Halle, Harz, Jerichower Land, Magdeburg, Mansfeld-Südharz, Saalekreis, Salzland or Wittenberg district FA league systems
9	14 divisions of Kreisoberliga – 211 teams
10	18 divisions of Kreisliga – 252 teams
11	20 divisions of 1. Kreisklasse – 241 teams
12	11 divisions of 2. Kreisklasse – 126 teams

==== Thuringia ====
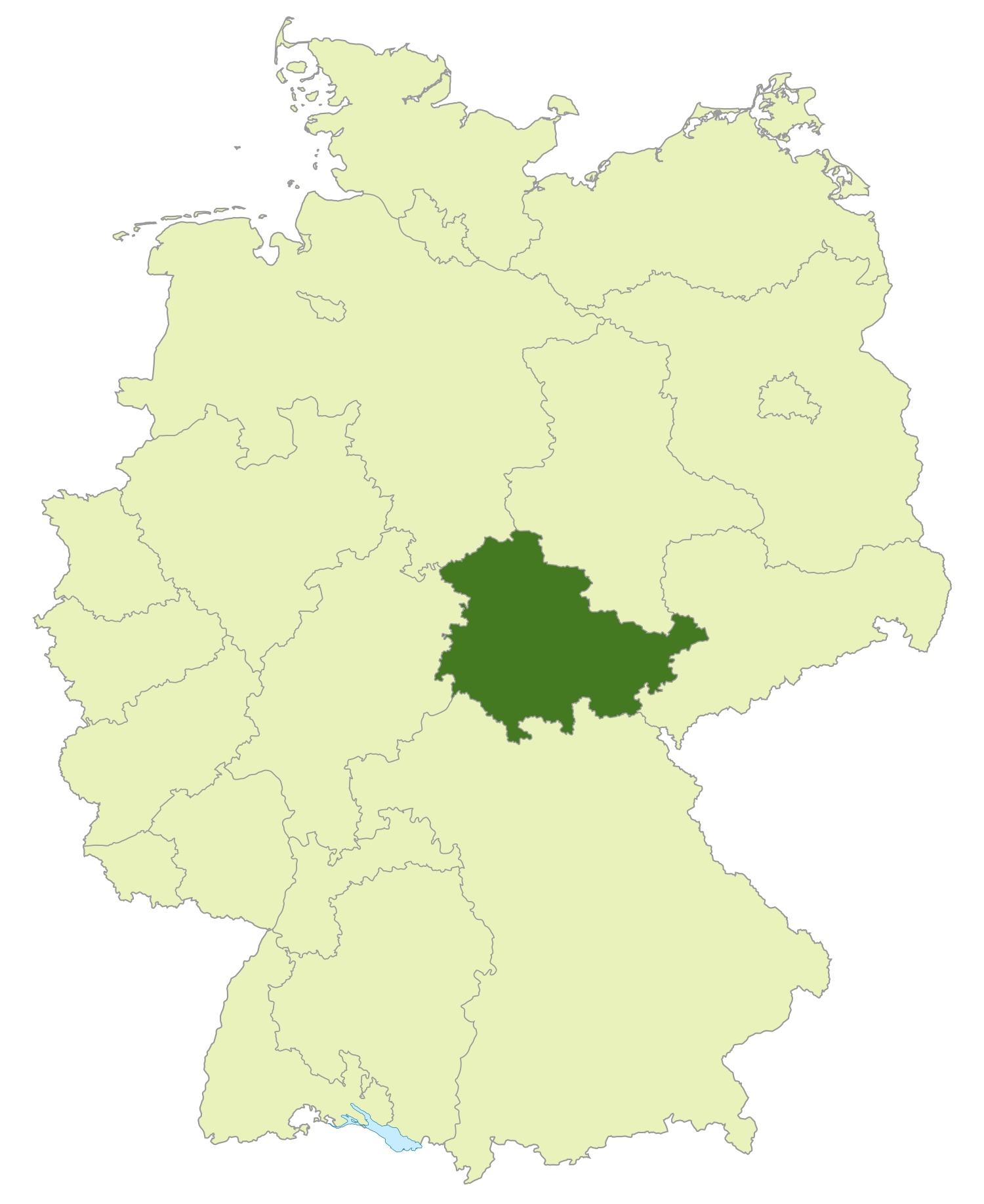
Thuringian Football Association

The Thuringian Football Association league system is the state association league system in the state of Thuringia and starts at level six of the German league system with the Thüringenliga on top. The current (2016–17 season) champions are FSV Wacker 90 Nordhausen II (not promoted). The champions are directly promoted to Oberliga Nordost.

Below the state association league system nine district associations work as feeders to the Landesklasse. In the 2016–17 season, the full system comprises 75 divisions having 949 teams. Additionally, seven teams play above the state association league system: FC Carl Zeiss Jena and Rot-Weiß Erfurt (3. Liga), ZFC Meuselwitz and FSV Wacker 90 Nordhausen (Regionalliga Nordost), FC Carl Zeiss Jena II, Einheit Rudolstadt and BSG Wismut Gera (all Oberliga Nordost).

Level	Division
	↑ 1 promotion spot to Oberliga Nordost
6	Thüringenliga – 16 teams
7	3 divisions of Landesklasse – 48 teams
	↓ relegation to Central Thuringia, East Thuringia, Eichsfeld-Unstrut-Hainich, Erfurt-Sömmerda, Jena-Saale-Orla, North Thuringia, Rhön-Rennsteig, South Thuringia or West Thuringia district FA league systems
8	9 divisions of Kreisoberliga – 130 teams
9	17 divisions of Kreisliga – 239 teams
10	25 divisions of 1. Kreisklasse – 322 teams
11	20 divisions of 2. Kreisklasse – 194 teams

==== Saxony ====
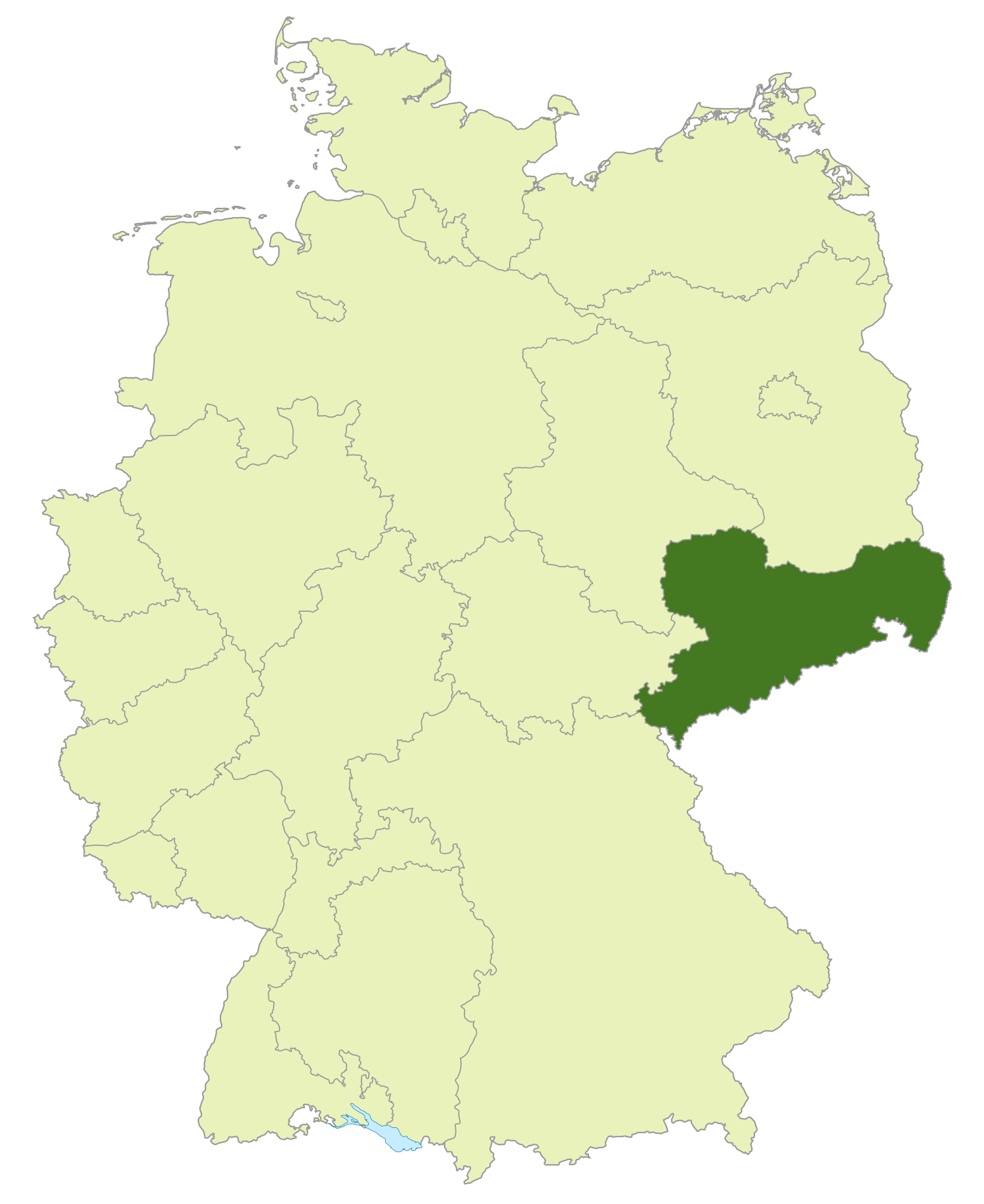
Saxony Football Association

The Saxony Football Association league system is the association league system in the state of Saxony and starts at level six of the German league system with the Sachsenliga on top. The current (2023–24 season) champions are SG Taucha 99. The champions are directly promoted to Oberliga Nordost. Below the state association league system 13 district associations work as feeders to the Sachsenklasse.

14 teams play above the state association league system: RB Leipzig (Bundesliga), FC Erzgebirge Aue and Dynamo Dresden (3. Liga), Chemnitzer FC, FSV Zwickau, 1. FC Lokomotive Leipzig, VFC Plauen, BSG Chemie Leipzig and FC Eilenburg (all Regionalliga Nordost), Bischofswerdaer FV 08, VfB Auerbach, SC Freital, Budissa Bautzen, and FC Grimma (all Oberliga Nordost).

Level	Division
	↑ 1 promotion spot to Oberliga Nordost
6	Sachsenliga – 16 teams
7	3 divisions of Sachsenklasse – 48 teams
	↓ relegation to Central Saxony, Chemnitz, Dresden, Erzgebirge, Leipzig, Meissen, Muldental/Leipzig region, North Saxony, Sächsische Schweiz/Osterzgebirge, Upper Lusatia, Vogtland, West Lusatia or Zwickau district FA league systems
8	13 divisions of Kreisoberliga – 190 teams
9	20 divisions of Kreisliga A – 280 teams
10	10 divisions of Kreisliga B – 129 teams
11	Kreisliga C – 14 teams
12	27 divisions of 1. Kreisklasse – 327 teams
13	17 divisions of 2. Kreisklasse – 187 teams
14	3. Kreisklasse – 14 teams

=== Western Germany ===
==== Lower Rhine ====
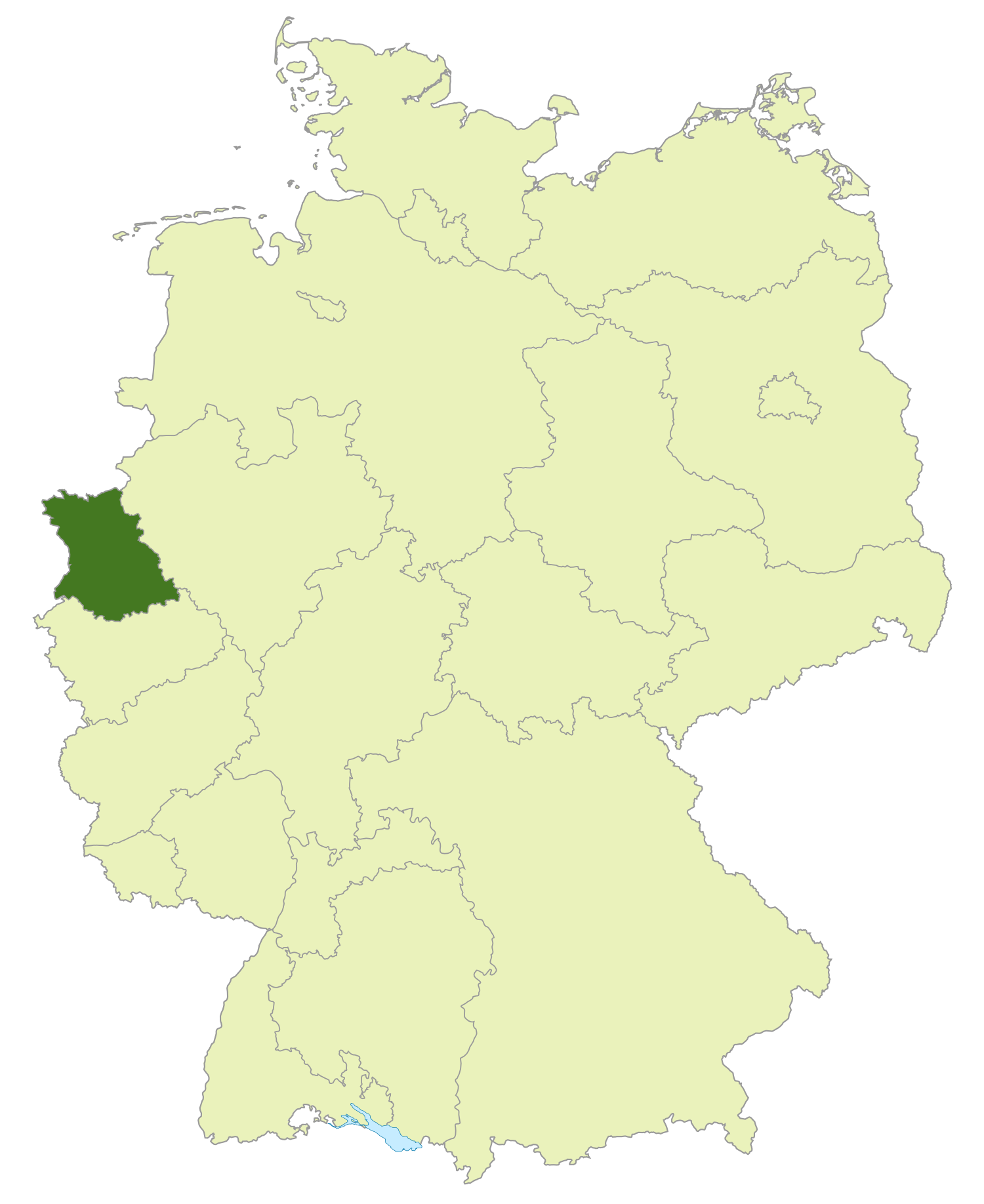
Lower Rhine Football Association

The Lower Rhine Football Association league system is one of three state association league systems in the state of North Rhine-Westphalia, covering its northwestern part, and starts at level five of the German league system with the Oberliga Niederrhein on top. The current (2016–17 season) champions are KFC Uerdingen 05. The champions are directly promoted to Regionalliga West.

Below the state association league system 13 district associations work as feeders to the Bezirksliga. In the 2016–17 season, the full system comprises 91 divisions having 1,476 teams. Additionally, nine teams play above the state association league system: Borussia Mönchengladbach (Bundesliga), Fortuna Düsseldorf (2. Bundesliga), MSV Duisburg (3. Liga), ( Borussia Mönchengladbach II, Rot-Weiß Oberhausen, Rot-Weiss Essen, Fortuna Düsseldorf II, KFC Uerdingen 05 and Wuppertaler SV (all Regionalliga West).

Level	Division
	↑ 1 promotion spot to Regionalliga West
5	Oberliga Niederrhein – 18 teams
6	2 divisions of Landesliga – 36 teams
7	7 divisions of Bezirksliga – 108 teams
	↓ relegation to Duisburg-Mülheim-Dinslaken, Düsseldorf, Essen, Grevenbroich-Neuss, Kempen-Krefeld, Kleve-Geldern, Moers, Mönchengladbach-Viersen, Oberhausen-Bottrop, Rees-Bocholt, Remscheid, Solingen or Wuppertal-Niederberg district FA league systems
8	15 divisions of Kreisliga A – 255 teams
9	29 divisions of Kreisliga B – 473 teams
10	38 divisions of Kreisliga C – 586 teams

==== Middle Rhine ====
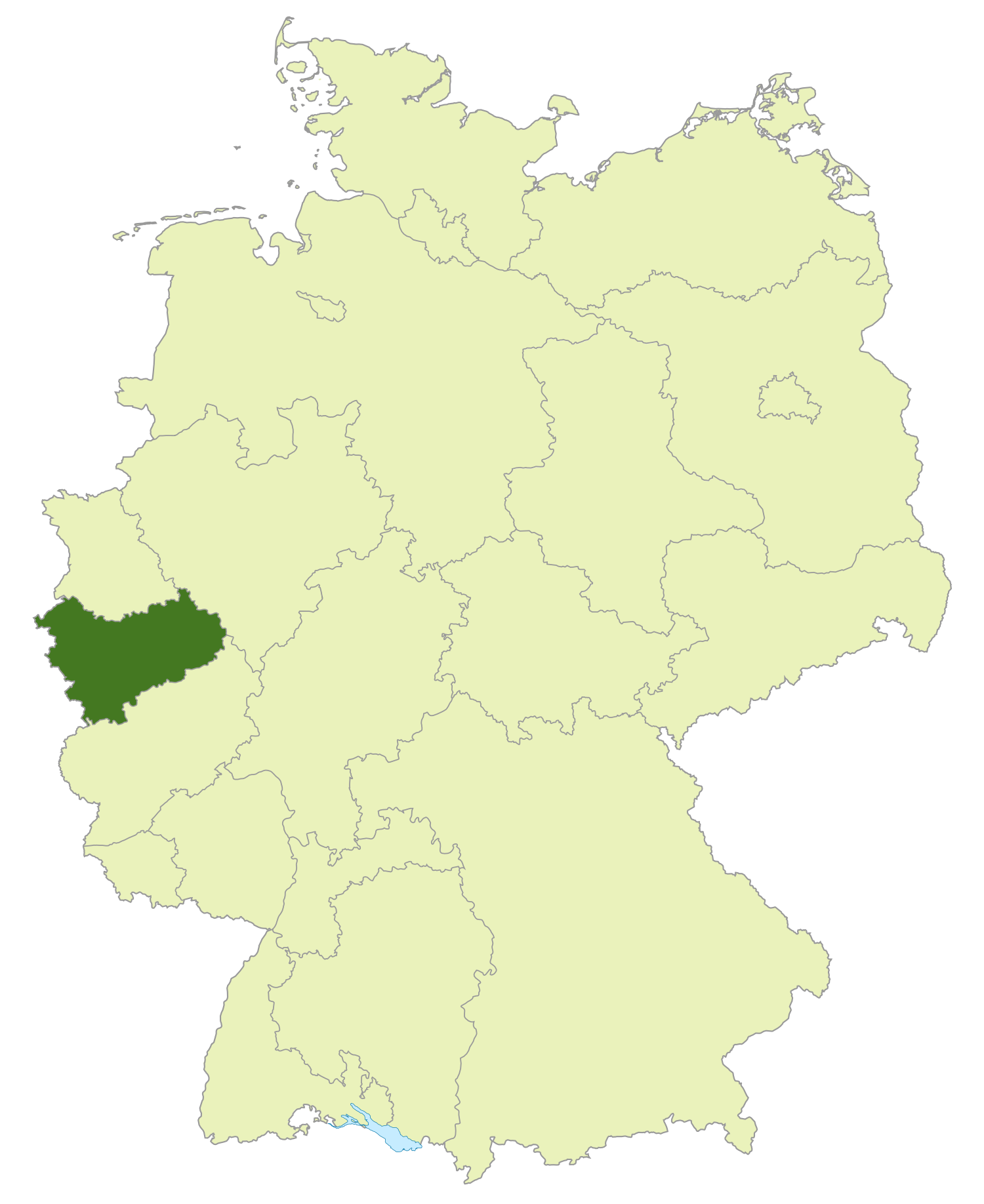
Middle Rhine Football Association

The Middle Rhine Football Association league system is one of three state association league systems in the state of North Rhine-Westphalia, covering its southwestern part, and starts at level five of the German league system with the Mittelrheinliga on top. The current (2016–17 season) champions are FC Wegberg-Beeck. The champions are directly promoted to Regionalliga West.

Below the state association league system nine district associations work as feeders to the Bezirksliga. In the 2016–17 season, the full system comprises 92 divisions having 1,348 teams. Additionally, eight teams play above the state association league system: Bayer Leverkusen and 1. FC Köln (Bundesliga), FC Viktoria Köln (3. Liga), Alemannia Aachen, 1. FC Köln II, SC Fortuna Köln, Bonner SC and FC Wegberg-Beeck (all Regionalliga West).

Level	Division
	↑ 1 promotion spot to Regionalliga West
5	Mittelrheinliga – 16 teams
6	2 divisions of Landesliga – 32 teams
7	4 divisions of Bezirksliga – 63 teams
	↓ relegation to Aachen, Berg, Bonn, Cologne, Düren, Euskirchen, Heinsberg, Rhein-Erft or Sieg district FA league systems
8	9 divisions of Kreisliga A – 140 teams
9	20 divisions of Kreisliga B – 310 teams
10	35 divisions of Kreisliga C – 493 teams
11	21 divisions of Kreisliga D – 294 teams

==== Westphalia ====
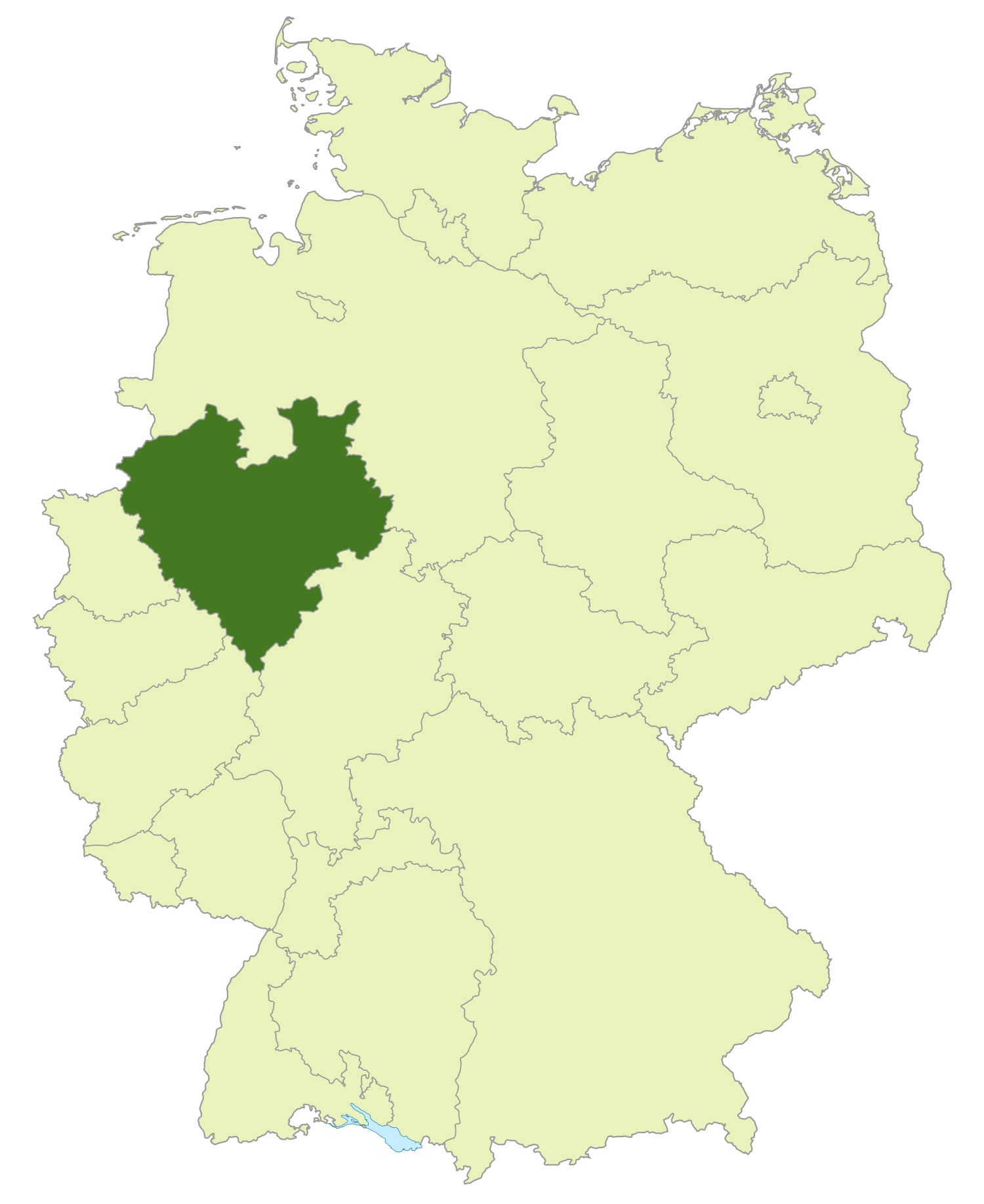
Westphalian Football and Athletics Association

The Westphalian Football and Athletics Association league system is one of three state association league systems in the state of North Rhine-Westphalia, covering its eastern part, and starts at level five of the German league system with the Oberliga Westfalen on top. The current (2016–17 season) champions are TuS Erndtebrück. The champions and the runner-up are directly promoted to Regionalliga West.

Below the state association league system 29 district associations work as feeders to the Bezirksliga. In the 2016–17 season, the full system comprises 214 divisions having 3,231 teams. Additionally, 14 teams play above the state association league system: Borussia Dortmund and Vfl Bochum (Bundesliga), Arminia Bielefeld and FC Schalke 04 (2. Bundesliga), Sportfreunde Lotte, Preußen Münster and SC Paderborn 07 (all 3. Liga), Borussia Dortmund II, TuS Erndtebrück, SC Verl, SC Wiedenbrück 2000, SV Rödinghausen, Westfalia Rhynern and SG Wattenscheid 09 (all Regionalliga West).

Level	Division
	↑ 2 promotion spots to Regionalliga West
5	Oberliga Westfalen – 18 teams
6	2 divisions of Westfalenliga – 32 teams
7	4 divisions of Landesliga – 64 teams
8	12 divisions of Bezirksliga – 194 teams
	↓ relegation to Ahaus-Coesfeld, Arnsberg, Beckum, Bielefeld, Bochum, Detmold, Dortmund, Gelsenkirchen, Gütersloh, Hagen, Herford, Herne, Hochsauerlandkreis, Höxter, Iserlohn, Lemgo, Lippstadt, Lübbecke, Lüdenscheid, Minden, Münster, Olpe, Paderborn, Recklinghausen, Siegen-Wittgenstein, Soest, Steinfurt, Tecklenburg or Unna-Hamm district FA league systems
9	39 divisions of Kreisliga A – 629 teams
10	57 divisions of Kreisliga B – 909 teams
11	79 divisions of Kreisliga C – 1,110 teams
12	20 divisions of Kreisliga D – 275 teams

=== Southwestern Germany ===
==== Rhineland ====
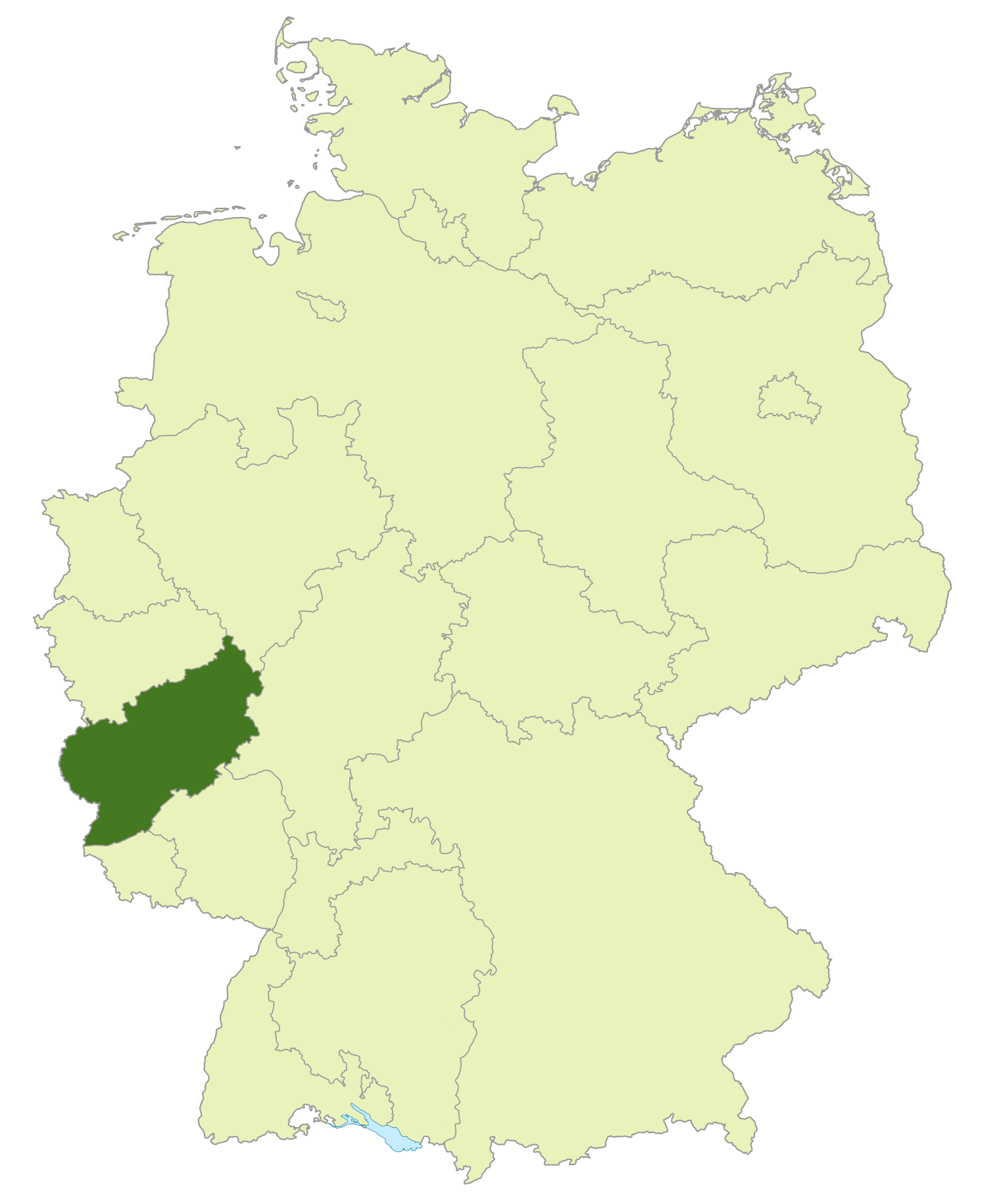
Rhineland Football Association

The Rhineland Football Association league system is one of two state association league systems in the state of Rhineland-Palatinate, covering its northern part, and starts at level six of the German league system with the Rheinlandliga on top. The current (2016–17 season) champions are FV Engers 07. The champions are directly promoted to Oberliga Rheinland-Pfalz/Saar.

Below the state association league system nine district associations work as feeders to the Bezirksliga. In the 2016–17 season, the full system comprises 70 divisions having 916 teams. Additionally, six teams play above the state association league system: TuS Koblenz (Regionalliga Südwest), FV Engers 07, FC Karbach, TuS Rot-Weiss Koblenz, FSV Salmrohr and Eintracht Trier (all Oberliga Rheinland-Pfalz/Saar).

Level	Division
	↑ 1 promotion spot to Oberliga Rheinland-Pfalz/Saar
6	Rheinlandliga – 19 teams
7	3 divisions of Bezirksliga – 47 teams
	↓ relegation to Eifel, Hunsrück/Mosel, Koblenz, Mosel, Rhein/Ahr, Rhein/Lahr, Trier/Saarburg, Westerwald/Sieg or Westerwald/Wied district FA league systems
8	9 divisions of Kreisliga A – 130 teams
9	16 divisions of Kreisliga B – 224 teams
10	20 divisions of Kreisliga C – 260 teams
11	21 divisions of Kreisliga D – 236 teams

==== Southwest ====
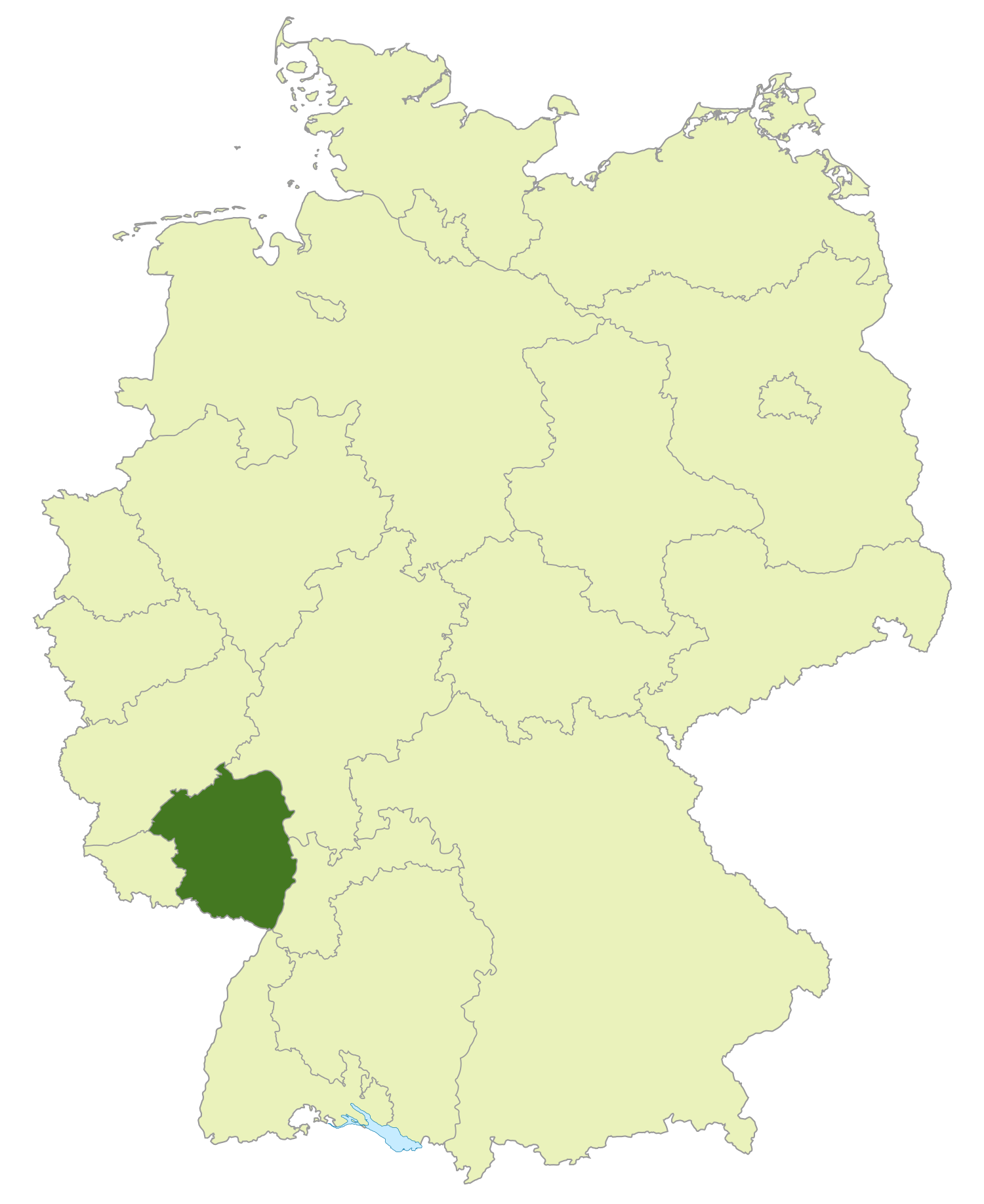
South West German Football Association

The South West German Football Association league system is one of two state association league systems in the state of Rhineland-Palatinate, covering its southern part, and starts at level six of the German league system with the Verbandsliga Südwest on top. The current (2016–17 season) champions are FV Dudenhofen. The champions are directly promoted to Oberliga Rheinland-Pfalz/Saar.

Below the state association league system 10 district associations work as feeders to the Bezirksliga. In the 2016–17 season, the full system comprises 67 divisions having 1,042 teams. Additionally, 14 teams play above the state association league system: 1. FSV Mainz 05 (Bundesliga), 1. FC Kaiserslautern (2. Bundesliga), Wormatia Worms, 1. FSV Mainz 05 II and TSV Schott Mainz (all Regionalliga Südwest), SV Morlautern, SC 07 Idar-Oberstein, 1. FC Kaiserslautern II, FK Pirmasens, TSG Pfeddersheim, SV Gonsenheim, TuS Mechtersheim, Arminia Ludwigshafen and FV Dudenhofen (all Oberliga Rheinland-Pfalz/Saar).

Level	Division
	↑ 1 promotion spot to Oberliga Rheinland-Pfalz/Saar
6	Verbandsliga Südwest – 16 teams
7	2 divisions of Landesliga – 32 teams
8	4 divisions of Bezirksliga – 66 teams
	↓ relegation to Alzey-Worms, Bad Kreuznach, Birkenfeld, Kaiserslautern-Donnersberg, Kusel-Kaiserslautern, Mainz-Bingen, Pirmasens/Zweibrücken, Rhine-Middle Haardt, Rhine-Palatinate and South Palatinate district FA league systems
9	10 divisions of A-Klasse – 160 teams
10	20 divisions of B-Klasse – 317 teams
11	27 divisions of C-Klasse – 403 teams
12	3 divisions of D-Klasse – 48 teams

==== Saarland ====
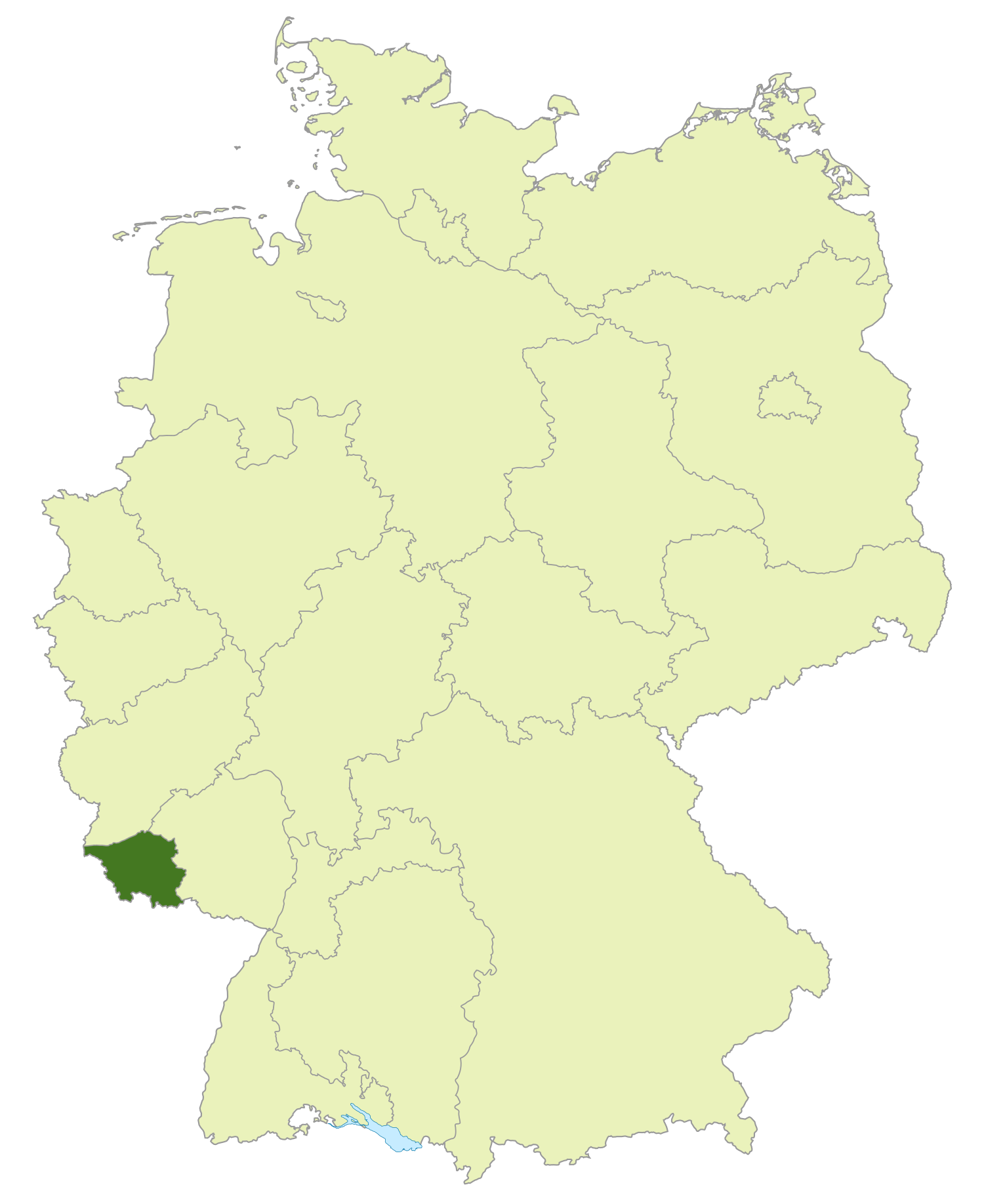
Saarland Football Association

The Saarland Football Association league system is the association league system in the state of Saarland and starts at level six of the German league system with the Saarlandliga on top. The current (2016–17 season) champions are FV Eppelborn. The champions are directly promoted to Oberliga Rheinland-Pfalz/Saar.

Below the state association league system four district associations work as feeders to the Bezirksliga. In the 2016–17 season, the full system comprises 40 divisions having 587 teams. Additionally, nine teams play above the state association league system: 1. FC Saarbrücken, SV Röchling Völklingen and SV Elversberg (all Regionalliga Südwest), SV Saar 05 Saarbrücken, FC Hertha Wiesbach, FSV Jägersburg, FV Diefflen, FV Eppelborn and FC 08 Homburg (all Oberliga Rheinland-Pfalz/Saar).

Level	Division
	↑ 1 promotion spot to Oberliga Rheinland-Pfalz/Saar
6	Saarlandliga – 18 teams
7	2 divisions of Verbandsliga – 32 teams
8	4 divisions of Landesliga – 64 teams
9	6 divisions of Bezirksliga – 97 teams
	↓ relegation to East Saar, North Saar, South Saar or West Saar district FA league systems
10	15 divisions of Kreisliga A – 226 teams
11	12 divisions of Kreisliga B – 150 teams

=== Southern Germany ===
==== Hesse ====
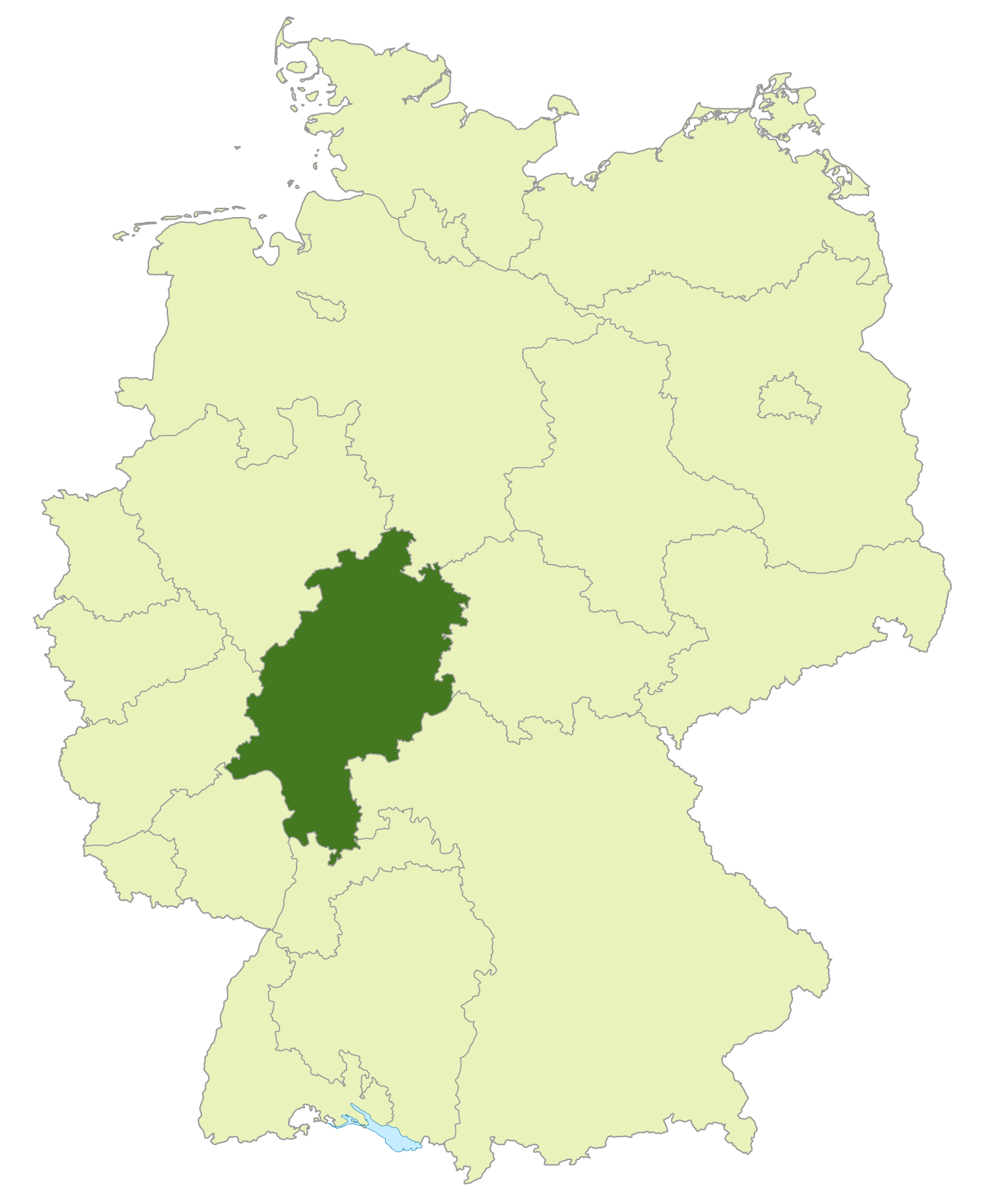
Hessian Football Association

The Hessian Football Association league system is the state association league system in the state of Hesse and starts at level five of the German league system with the Hessenliga on top. The current (2016–17 season) champions are SC Hessen Dreieich (not promoted). The champions are directly promoted to Regionalliga Südwest.

Below the state association league system six county associations and following them 32 district associations work as feeders to the Verbandsliga. In the 2016–17 season, the full system comprises 165 divisions having 2,526 teams. Additionally, eight teams play above the state association league system: Eintracht Frankfurt (Bundesliga), SV Darmstadt 98 (2. Bundesliga), SV Wehen-Wiesbaden (3. Liga), FSV Frankfurt, KSV Hessen Kassel, Kickers Offenbach, TSV Steinbach and TSV Eintracht Stadtallendorf (all Regionalliga Südwest).

Level	Division
	↓ 1 promotion spot to Regionalliga Südwest
5	Hessenliga – 17 teams
6	3 divisions of Verbandsliga – 51 teams
	↓ relegation to Darmstadt, Frankfurt, Fulda, Giessen/Marburg, Kassel or Wiesbaden county FA league systems
7	8 divisions of Gruppenliga – 131 teams
	↓ relegation to Alsfeld, Bergstraße, Biedenkopf, Büdingen, Darmstadt, Dieburg, Dillenburg, Frankenberg, Frankfurt, Friedberg, Fulda, Gelnhausen, Giessen, Groß-Gerau, Hanau, Hersfeld-Rotenburg, Hochtaunus, Hofgeismar-Wolfhagen, Kassel, Lauterbach-Hünfeld, Limburg-Weilburg, Maintaunus, Marburg, Odenwald, Offenbach, Rheingau-Taunus, Schlüchtern, Schwalm-Eder, Waldeck, Werra/Meißner, Wetzlar or Wiesbaden district FA league systems
8	25 divisions of Kreisoberliga – 405 teams
9	38 divisions of Kreisliga A – 604 teams
10	49 divisions of Kreisliga B – 732 teams
11	32 divisions of Kreisliga C – 460 teams
12	9 divisions of Kreisliga D – 126 teams

==== Baden ====
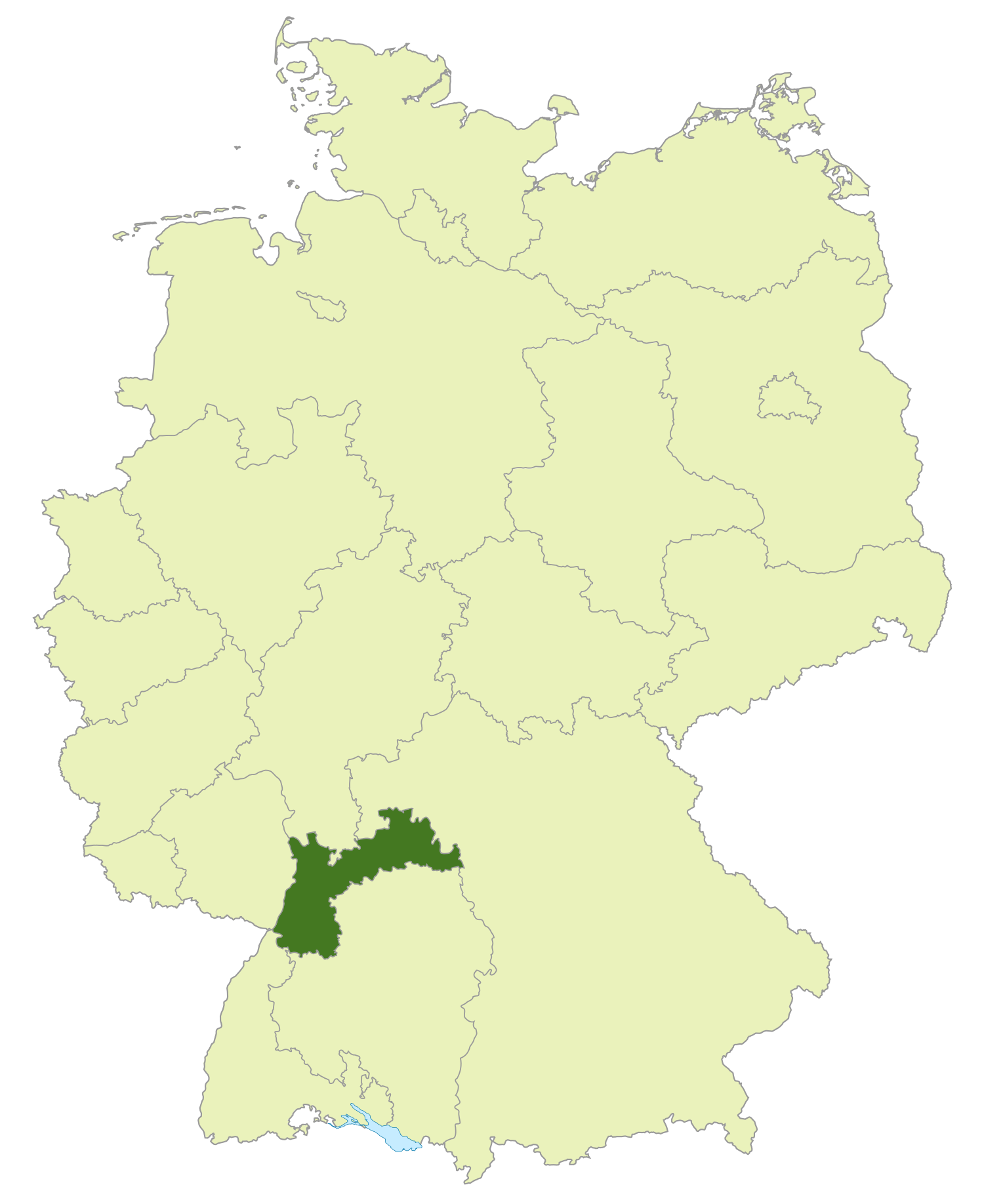
Baden Football Association

The Baden Football Association league system is one of three state association league systems in the state of Baden-Württemberg, covering its northwestern part, and starts at level six of the German league system with the Verbandsliga Nordbaden on top. The current (2021–22 season) champions are ATSV Mutschelbach. The champions are directly promoted to Oberliga Baden-Württemberg, whereas the runner-up enters a promotion playoff along with the Verbandsliga Südbaden runner-up and the Verbandsliga Württemberg runner-up for one additional promotion.

Below the state association league system nine district associations league systems work as feeders to the Landesliga. In the 2016–17 season, the full system comprises 57 divisions having 818 teams. Additionally, 13 teams play above the state association league system: TSG 1899 Hoffenheim (Bundesliga), SV Sandhausen (2. Bundesliga), Karlsruher SC (3. Liga), 1899 Hoffenheim II, SV Waldhof Mannheim and FC Astoria Walldorf (all Regionalliga Südwest), Karlsruher SC II, FC Nöttingen, 1. CfR Pforzheim, SV Sandhausen II, SV Spielberg, FC Astoria Walldorf II and TSG Weinheim (all Oberliga Baden-Württemberg).

Level	Division
	↑ 1 promotion spot + 1 promotion playoff spot to Oberliga Baden-Württemberg
6	Verbandsliga Nordbaden – 15 teams
7	3 divisions of Landesliga – 48 teams
	↓ relegation to Bruchsal, Buchen, Heidelberg, Karlsruhe, Mannheim, Mosbach, Pforzheim, Sinsheim or Tauberbischofsheim district FA league systems
8	9 divisions of Kreisliga – 140 teams
9	12 divisions of Kreisklasse A – 187 teams
10	16 divisions of Kreisklasse B – 239 teams
11	16 divisions of Kreisklasse C – 188 teams

==== South Baden ====
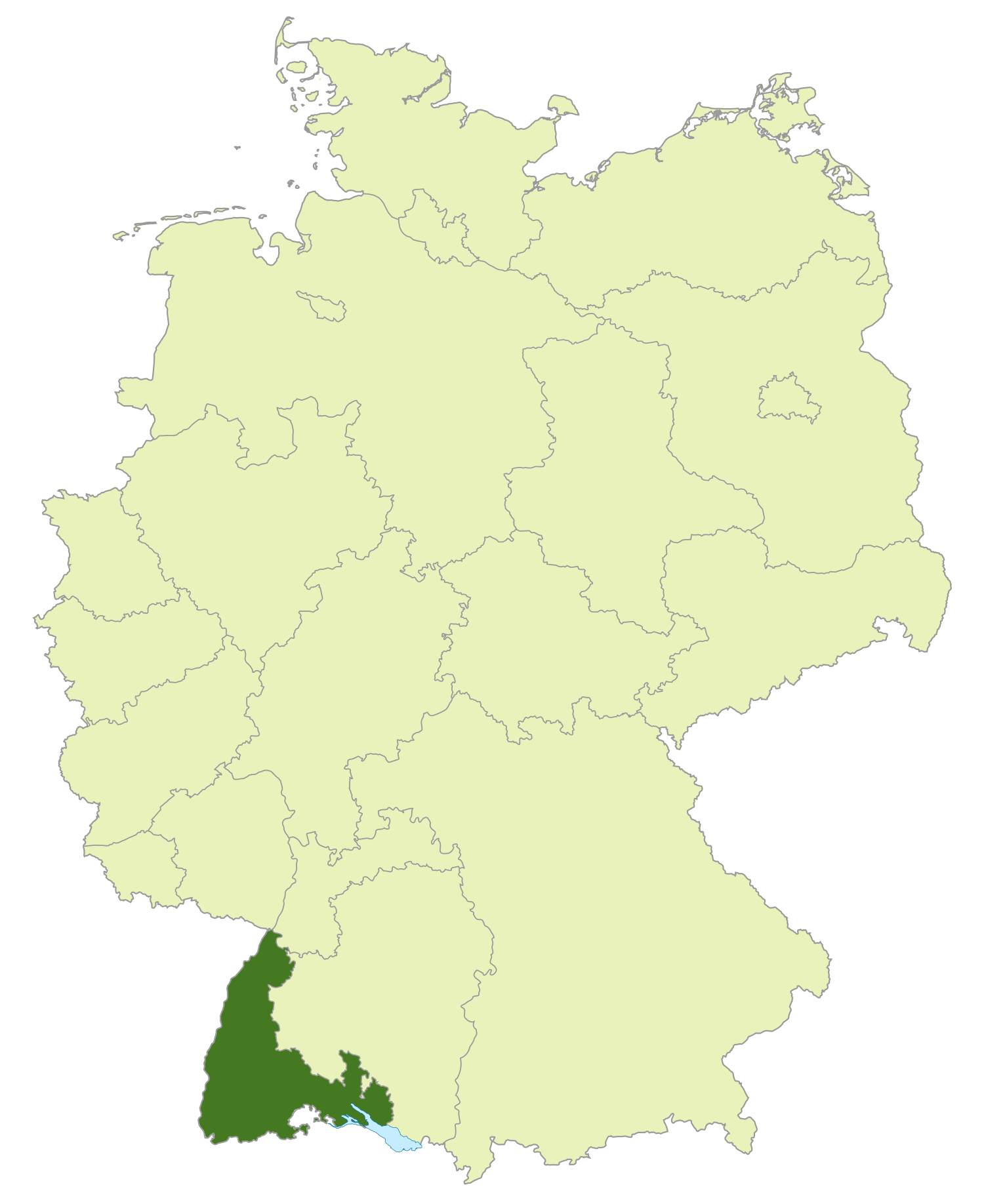
South Baden Football Association

The South Baden Football Association league system is one of three state association league systems in the state of Baden-Württemberg, covering its southwestern part, and starts at level six of the German league system with the Verbandsliga Südbaden on top. The current (2016–17 season) champions are FC 08 Villingen. The champions are directly promoted to Oberliga Baden-Württemberg, whereas the runner-up enters a promotion playoff along with the Verbandsliga Baden runner-up and the Verbandsliga Württemberg runner-up for one additional promotion.

Below the state association league system six county associations work as feeders to the Landesliga. In the 2016–17 season, the full system comprises 81 divisions having 1,146 teams. Additionally, six teams play above the state association league system: SC Freiburg (Bundesliga), SC Freiburg II (Regionalliga Südwest), Bahlinger SC, TSG Balingen, SV Oberachern and FC 08 Villingen (all Oberliga Baden-Württemberg).

Level	Division
	↑ 1 promotion spot + 1 promotion playoff spot to Oberliga Baden-Württemberg
6	Verbandsliga Südbaden – 16 teams
7	3 divisions of Landesliga – 49 teams
	↓ relegation to Baden-Baden, Black Forest, Bodensee, Freiburg, Hochrhein or Offenburg county FA league systems
8	6 divisions of Bezirksliga – 99 teams
9	13 divisions of Kreisliga A – 207 teams
10	32 divisions of Kreisliga B – 445 teams
11	26 divisions of Kreisliga C – 327 teams

==== Württemberg ====
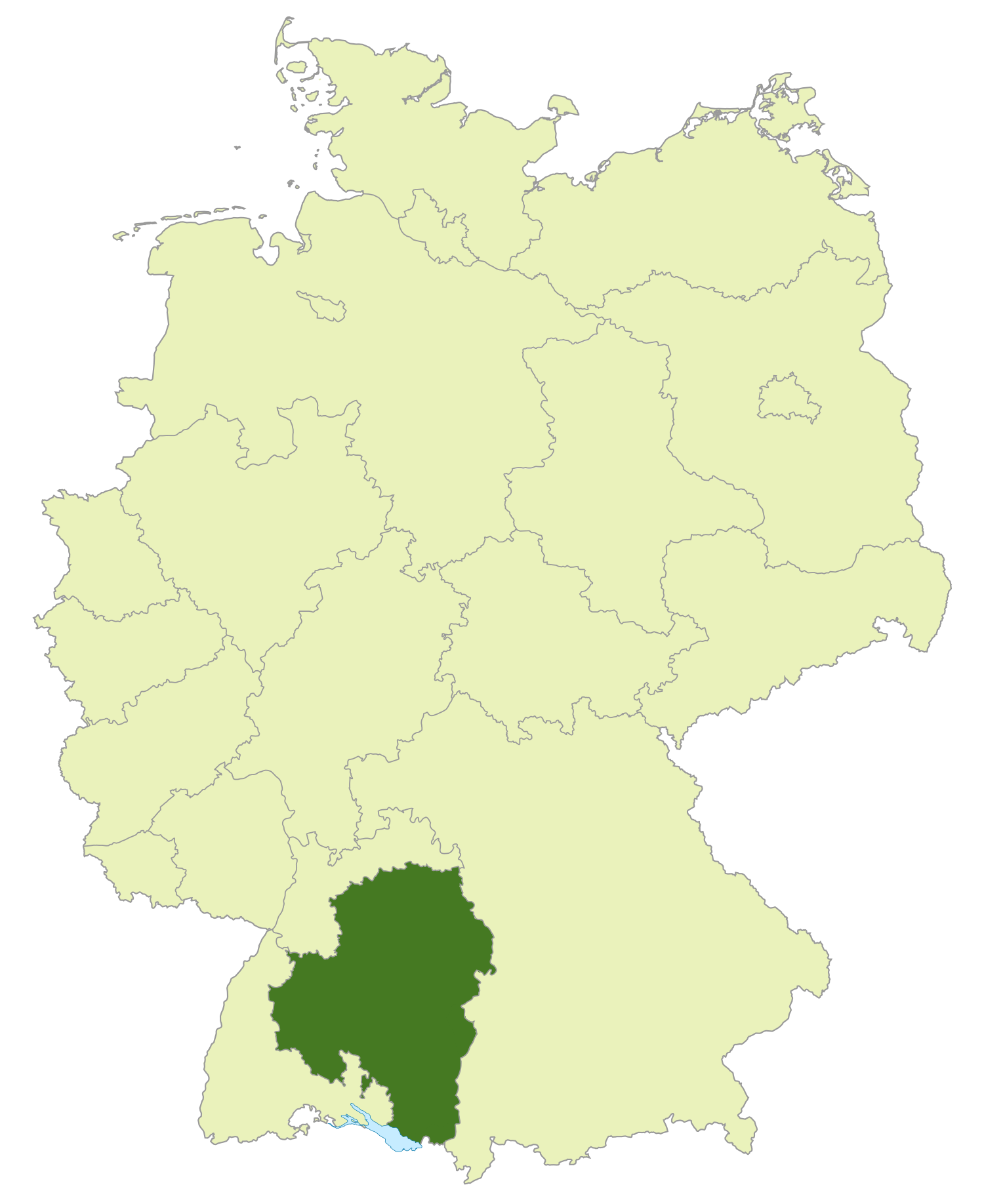
Württembergian Football Association

The Württembergian Football Association league system is one of three state association league systems in the state of Baden-Württemberg, covering its southeastern part, and starts at level six of the German league system with the Verbandsliga Württemberg on top. The current (2022-23 season) champions are TSV Essingen. The champions are directly promoted to Oberliga Baden-Württemberg, whereas the runner-up enters a promotion playoff along with the Verbandsliga Baden runner-up and the Verbandsliga Südbaden runner-up for one additional promotion.

Below the state association league system 16 county associations work as feeders to the Landesliga. In the 2016–17 season, the full system comprises 146 divisions having 2,053 teams. Additionally, 13 teams play above the state association league system: VfB Stuttgart (Bundesliga), 1. FC Heidenheim (2. Bundesliga), VfR Aalen and SG Sonnenhof Großaspach (3. Liga), VfB Stuttgart II, Stuttgarter Kickers and SSV Ulm 1846 Fußball (Regionalliga Südwest), TSG Backnang 1919, FSV 08 Bissingen, SGV Freiberg, SV Göppingen, Neckarsulmer SU and SSV Reutlingen 05 (all Oberliga Baden-Württemberg).

Level	Division
	↑ 1 promotion spot + 1 promotion playoff spot to Oberliga Baden-Württemberg
6	Verbandsliga Württemberg – 16 teams
7	4 divisions of Landesliga – 64 teams
	↓ relegation to Alb, Black Forest, Böblingen/Calw, Bodensee, Danube, Danube/Iller, Enz/Murr, Hohenlohe, Kocher/Rems, Neckar/Fils, Northern Black Forest, Rems/Murr, Riß, Stuttgart, Unterland or Zollern county FA league systems
8	16 divisions of Bezirksliga – 254 teams
9	40 divisions of Kreisliga A – 597 teams
10	77 divisions of Kreisliga B – 1,037 teams
11	8 divisions of Kreisliga C – 85 teams

==== Bavaria ====
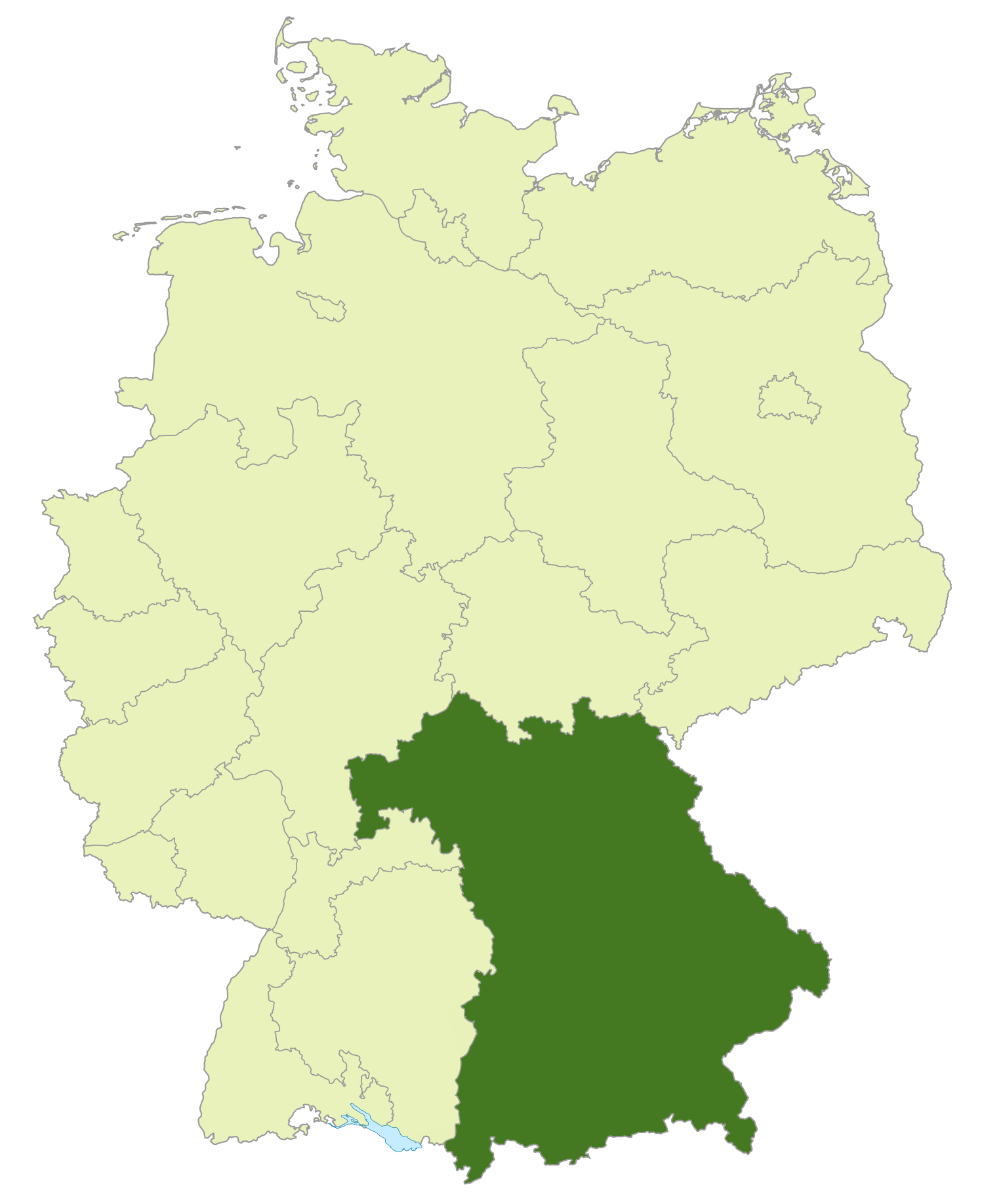
Bavarian Football Association

The Bavarian Football Association league system is the state association league system in the state of Bavaria and starts at level four of the league system with the Regionalliga Bayern on top. The champions enter a promotion playoff along with the Regionalliga Nord champions, the Regionalliga Nordost champions, the Regionalliga Südwest champions and runner-up and the Regionalliga West champions for three promotions to the 3. Liga. The current (2016–17 season) champions are SpVgg Unterhaching.

Below the state association league system seven county associations and following them 24 district associations work as feeders to the Landesliga. In the 2016–17 season, the full system comprises 442 divisions having 6,054 teams. Additionally, nine teams play above the state association league system: FC Bayern Munich and FC Augsburg (all Bundesliga), SpVgg Greuther Fürth, FC Ingolstadt, SSV Jahn Regensburg and 1. FC Nürnberg (all 2. Bundesliga), SpVgg Unterhaching, TSV 1860 Munich and Würzburger Kickers (all 3. Liga).

Level	Division
	↑ 1 promotion playoff spot to 3. Liga
4	Regionalliga Bayern – 19 teams ↓ 2 to 4 relegation spots
5	2 divisions of Bayernliga – 37 teams
6	5 divisions of Landesliga – 87 teams
	↓ relegation to Middle Franconia, Lower Bavaria, Upper Bavaria, Upper Franconia, Upper Palatinate, Swabia and Lower Franconia county FA league systems
7	15 divisions of Bezirksliga – 244 teams
	↓ relegation to Allgäu, Amberg/Weiden, Aschaffenburg, Augsburg, Bamberg/Bayreuth, Bavarian Forest, Cham/Schwandorf, Coburg/Kronach, Danube, Danube/Isar, Erlangen/Pegnitzgrund, Hof/Marktredwitz, Inn/Salzach, Landshut, Munich, Neumarkt/Jura, Nuremberg/Frankenhöhe, Passau, Regensburg, Rhön, Schweinfurt, Straubing, Würzburg and Zugspitze district FA league systems
8	43 divisions of Kreisliga – 633 teams
9	92 divisions of Kreisklasse – 1,296 teams
10	129 divisions of A-Klasse – 1,787 teams
11	128 divisions of B-Klasse – 1,618 teams
12	27 divisions of C-Klasse – 335 teams

== See also ==
- Football in Germany
- German women's football league system
- Women's football in Germany
