= TFV =

TFV may refer to:

- Thüringer Fußballverband, the umbrella organization of the football clubs in the German state Thuringia
- Tiroler Fussballerband, an umbrella organization of the football clubs of the Austrian state Tyrol, Austria
- Tracked Firefighting Vehicle, a Bandvagn 206 that is used in forested areas
