= Saxony-Anhalt Football Association =

- Formation: 19 August 1990
- Type: Football association
- Headquarters: Friedrich-Ebert-Straße 62
- Location: Magdeburg, Germany
- Members: 89,441 (2017)
- President: Erwin Bugar
- Parent organization: German Football Association
- Website: fsa-online.de

The Saxony-Anhalt Football Association (German: Fußballverband Sachsen-Anhalt - FSA), is the umbrella organization of the football clubs in the German state Saxony-Anhalt and covers 14 football districts. The FSA was founded in 1990 and has its headquarters in Magdeburg. President of the association is Erwin Bugar.

The FSA belongs to the Northeastern German Football Association and is one of 21 state organizations of the German Football Association (German: Deutscher Fussball-Bund - DFB).

In 2017, the FSA had 89,441 members from 787 football clubs with 3,331 teams.
