= Northeastern German Football Association =

- NOFV logo since 2019
- Formation: 20 November 1990
- Type: Football association
- Headquarters: Fritz-Lesch-Strasse 38
- Location: Berlin
- Members: 833,045 (2025)
- President: Hermann Winkler
- Parent organization: German Football Association
- Website: www.nofv-online.de

The Northeastern German Football Association (German: Nordostdeutscher Fußballverband), the NOFV, is one of five regional organisations of the German Football Association, the DFB, and covers the states of Berlin, Brandenburg, Mecklenburg-Western Pomerania, Saxony, Saxony-Anhalt and Thuringia.

== Overview ==
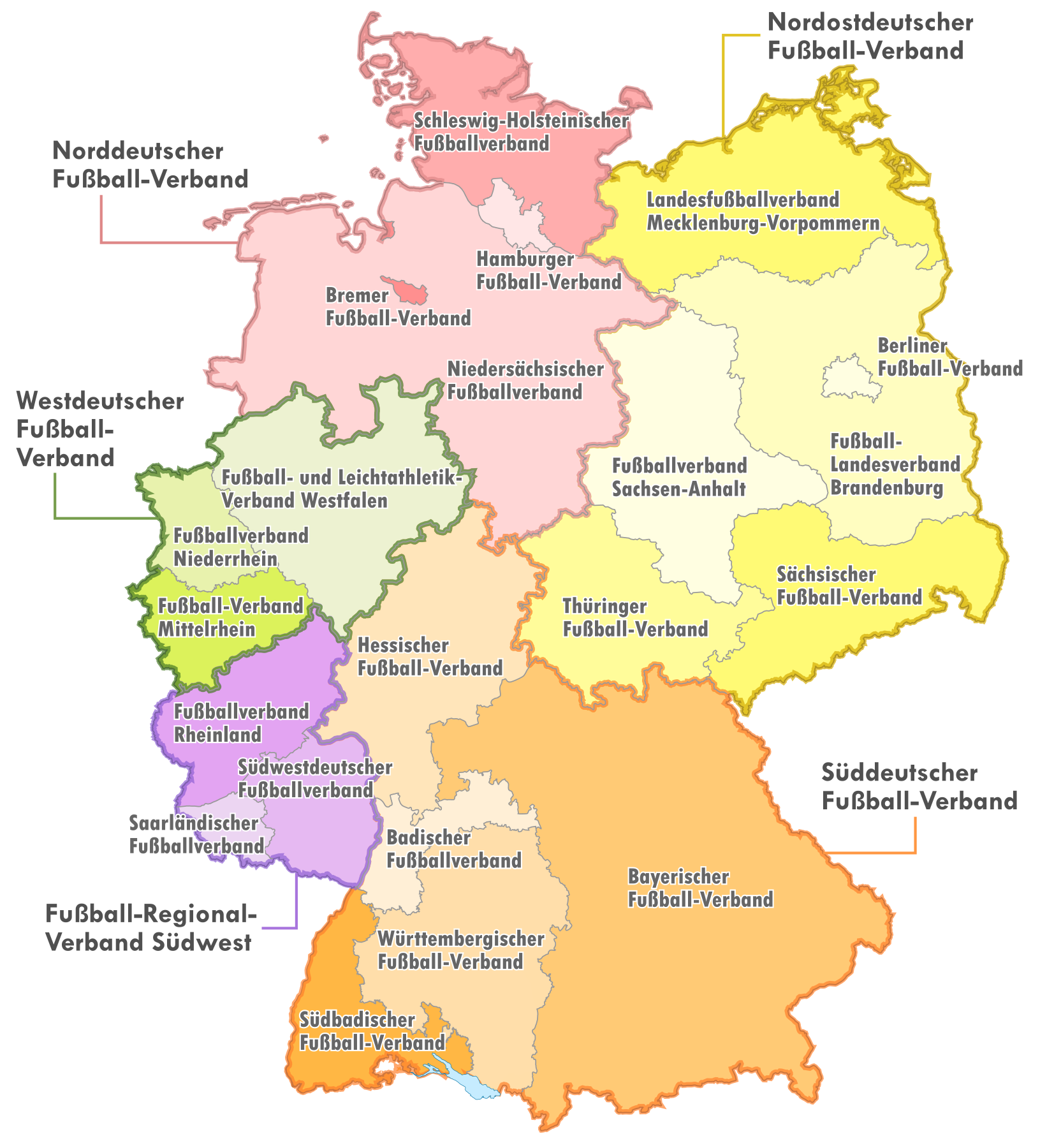
DFB, its five regional and 21 state associations

The NOFV was formed on 20 November 1990 in Leipzig to take the place of the Deutscher Fußball-Verband der DDR, the DFV which was dissolved immediately before the formation of the new association at the same location. The DFV had been the football association of East Germany which itself had ceased to exist after the German reunification on 3 October 1990.

The NOFV is in turn subdivided into the Berlin Football Association, Brandenburg State Football Association, Mecklenburg-Vorpommern State Football Association, Saxony Football Association, Saxony-Anhalt Football Association and the Thuringia Football Association.

In 2025, the NOFV has had 833,045 members, 4,084 member clubs and 20,967 teams playing in its league system.

Former logo
