= Saxony Football Association =

Governing body of association football in Saxony

- Formation: 6 October 1990
- Type: Football association
- Headquarters: Abtaundorfer Straße 47
- Location: Leipzig, Germany
- Members: 152,902 (2017)
- President: Klaus Reichenbach
- Parent organization: German Football Association
- Website: sfv-online.de

The Saxony Football Association (German: Sächsischer Fußball-Verband, SFV), is the umbrella organization of the football clubs in the German state Saxony and covers 13 football districts. The SFV was founded in 1990 and has its headquarters in Leipzig. President of the association is Klaus Reichenbach.

The SFV belongs to the Northeastern German Football Association and is one of 21 state organizations of the German Football Association (German: Deutscher Fussball-Bund - DFB).

In 2017, the SFV had 152,902 members from 908 football clubs with 6,431 teams.
