= Mecklenburg-Vorpommern State Football Association =

Mecklenburg-Western Pomerania State Football Association
- Formation: 14 July 1990
- Type: Football association
- Headquarters: Kopernikusstraße 17a
- Location: Rostock, Germany
- Members: 58,949 (2017)
- President: Joachim Masuch
- Parent organization: German Football Association
- Website: lfvm-v.de

The Mecklenburg-Western Pomerania Football Association (German: Landesfußballverband Mecklenburg-Vorpommern, LFVMV), is the umbrella organization of the football clubs in the German state Mecklenburg-Western Pomerania and covers the football districts of Mecklenburg Lake District, Vorpommern-Rügen, Schwerin – Nordwestmecklenburg, Western Pomerania – Greifswald, Warnow and West Mecklenburg. The LFVMV was founded in 1990 and has its headquarters in Rostock. President of the association is Joachim Masuch.

The LFV belongs to the Northeastern German Football Association and is one of 21 state organizations of the German Football Association (German: Deutscher Fussball-Bund - DFB).

In 2017, the LFV had 58,949 members from 469 football clubs with 1,923 teams.
