= Thuringian Football Association =

Thuringia Football Association
- Formation: 1 March 1990
- Type: Football association
- Headquarters: Augsburger Straße 10
- Location: Erfurt, Germany
- Members: 98,801 (2017)
- President: Wolfhardt Tomaschewski
- Parent organization: German Football Association
- Website: tfv-erfurt.de

The Thuringia Football Association (German: Thüringer Fußballverband - TFV), is the umbrella organization of the football clubs in the German state Thuringia and covers nine football districts. The TFV was founded in 1990 and has its headquarters in Erfurt. President of the association is Wolfhardt Tomaschewski.

The TFV belongs to the Northeastern German Football Association and is one of 21 state organizations of the German Football Association (German: Deutscher Fussball-Bund - DFB).

In 2017, the TFV had 98,801 members from 1,104 football clubs with 3,134 teams.
