= Bernd Neuendorf =

German politician, journalist and football administrator (born 1961)

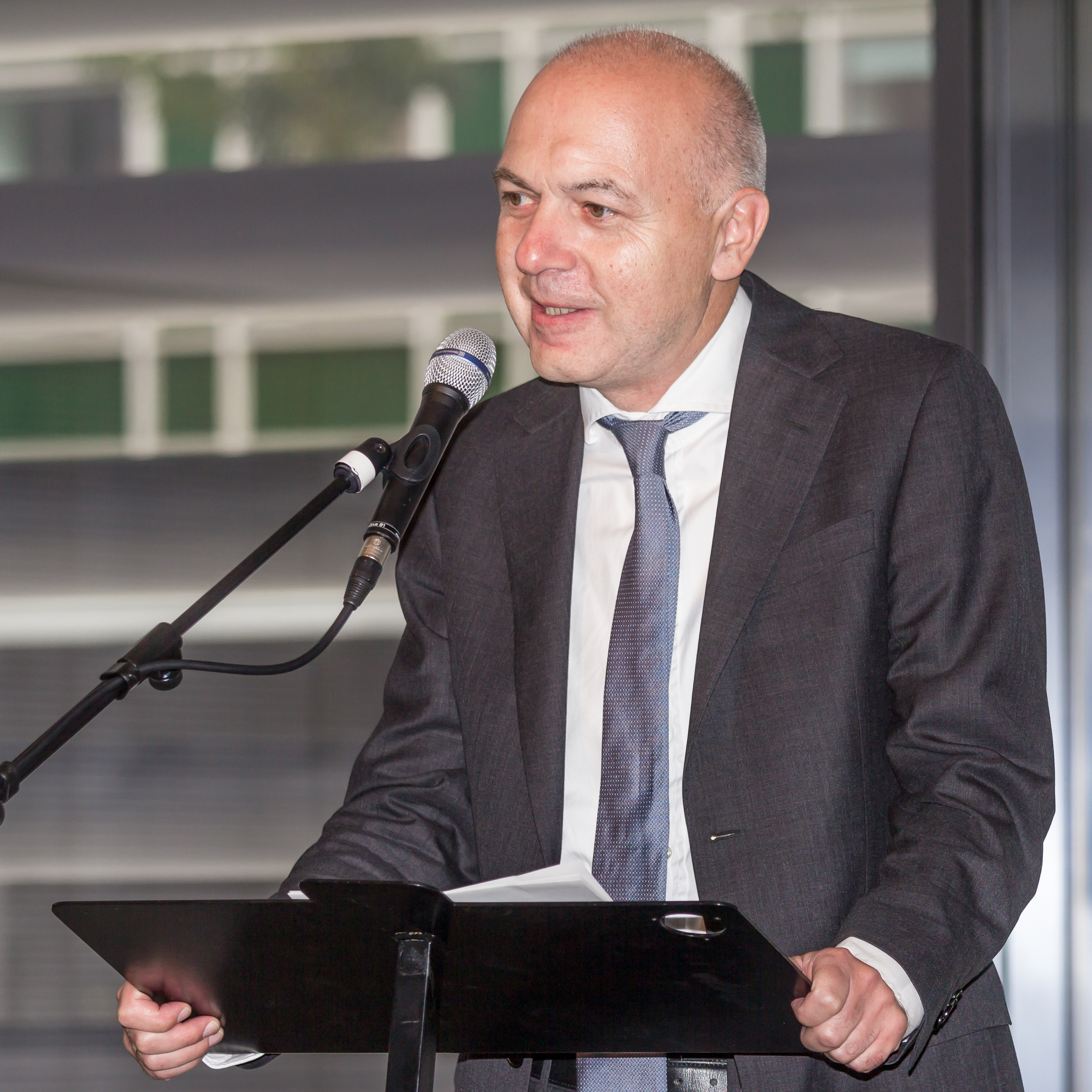
- Neuendorf in 2015

14th President of the DFB
- Incumbent
- Assumed office 11 March 2022
- Preceded by: Rainer Koch and Peter Peters (acting)

President of the Middle Rhine Football Association
- In office 29 June 2019 – 11 March 2022
- Preceded by: Alfred Vianden
- Succeeded by: Hans-Christian Olpen and Johanna Sandvoß (acting); Christos Katzidis

State Secretary of the Ministry for Family, Children, Youth, Culture and Sport of North Rhine-Westphalia
- In office 1 October 2012 – 27 June 2017
- Minister: Ute Schäfer (2012–2015); Christina Kampmann (2015–2017)
- Preceded by: Klaus Schäfer
- Succeeded by: Andreas Bothe

Personal details
- Born: Bernd Johannes Neuendorf; 6 July 1961 (age 64) Düren, West Germany
- Party: SPD
- Children: 2
- Occupation: Journalist; politician

Bernd Johannes Neuendorf (born 6 July 1961) is a German politician, journalist and football administrator who is currently serving as the president of the German Football Association (DFB). He had previously served as the president of the Middle Rhine Football Association from 2019 until his election as DFB president in 2022. Before entering sports, he was the state secretary of the Ministry for Family, Children, Youth, Culture and Sport of North Rhine-Westphalia from 2012 to 2017.

== Early life ==
Neuendorf was born in Düren and grew up in the municipality of Hürtgenwald. He studied modern history, political science and sociology in Bonn and Oxford after receiving his Abitur from the Gymnasium am Wirteltor Düren. He played youth football for FC Grenzwacht Hürtgen, where he is still a club member, as a left winger until suffering a serious knee injury. After a traineeship at Reuters from 1989 to 1990, he worked as an editor for the Associated Press in Frankfurt until 1991. Between 1992 and 1999, Neuendorf was a parliamentary correspondent for various daily newspapers in Bonn. He then moved to the Mitteldeutsche Zeitung in Halle (Saale). There he was deputy editor-in-chief from 2001 to 2003.

== Politics ==
In 2003, Neuendorf became a spokesperson for the SPD party executive in Berlin. In 2004, he became the head of the press and public relations department for SPD North Rhine-Westphalia. From 2007 to October 2012, he was the state manager of the SPD in North Rhine-Westphalia. From October 2012 until the change of government in June 2017, he succeeded Klaus Schäfer as state secretary of the Ministry for Family, Children, Youth, Culture and Sport of North Rhine-Westphalia.

Since 1 October 2019, Neuendorf has served as a board member of the Federal Chancellor Helmut Schmidt Foundation in Hamburg.

== Sports administration ==
On 29 June 2019, Neuendorf was unanimously elected president of the Middle Rhine Football Association at the association congress, succeeding Alfred Vianden in a term lasting until 2022. Neuendorf also served a member of the DFB Executive Committee and vice-president of the Western German Football Association.

On 11 March 2022, Neuendorf ran for the presidency of the German Football Association (DFB) at the DFB-Bundestag in Bonn. He won the election with 193 of the 250 votes cast, becoming the 14th president of the DFB. He defeated Peter Peters, who had formed an interim dual leadership with Rainer Koch following the resignation of Fritz Keller in May 2021. Following his election, he duly resigned from his previous post as president of the Middle Rhine Football Association.

== Personal life ==
Neuendorf is married and has two children.
