= German Football Museum =

Football museum in Germany

- Deutsches Fußballmuseum
- Museum Logo

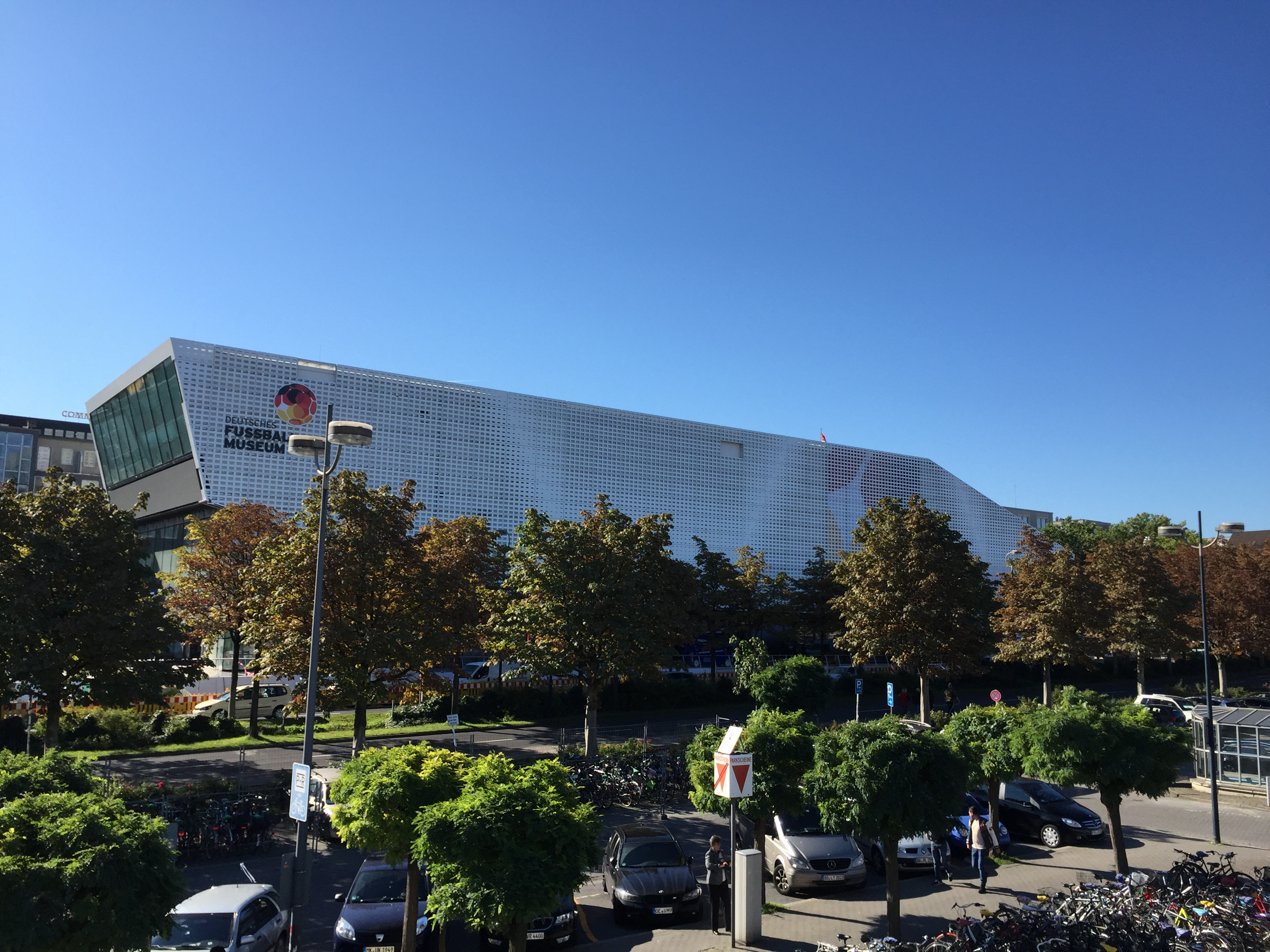
- Image of the museum in September 2015
- Established: 23 October 2015
- Location: Dortmund, Germany
- Coordinates: 51°30′58.5″N 7°27′30.8″E
- Type: Football museum
- Visitors: 200,000
- CEO: Manuel Neukirchner; Michael Keßeler
- Architects: Office HPP Hentrich-Petschnigg + Partner, Düsseldorf
- Owner: DFB-Stiftung Deutsches Fußballmuseum gGmbH
- Website: fussballmuseum.de

The German Football Museum (German: Deutsches Fußballmuseum) a.k.a. DFB-Museum is the national museum for German football in Dortmund, Germany. It opened on 23 October 2015.

== History ==
After the 2006 FIFA World Cup in Germany, the German Football Association (German: Deutscher Fußball-Bund [ˈdɔʏtʃɐ ˈfuːsbalˌbʊnt]; DFB [ˌdeːʔɛfˈbeː]) decided to finance the establishment of a national German soccer museum. In May 2007, the DFB Presidium shortlisted the cities of Cologne, Oberhausen, Gelsenkirchen and Dortmund from the 14 cities that had applied as a location for the football museum, locating museum in the most populous state of North Rhine-Westphalia. At a Bundestag of the DFB on 24 April 2009, the delegates decided on a location close to the city center south of Dortmund's Central Station, which had been previously used as a bus station. The area is part of an art and culture mile between the Dortmund U creative center and the Theater Dortmund concert hall.

=== Architectural competition ===
The city of Dortmund, in cooperation with the DFB, announced an international architectural competition for the building. On 4 May 2011, the jury of the competition awarded three designs from the 24 submitted works. There was no unqualified winning design. Instead, the judges awarded three equal awards to the architects HPP Hentrich-Petschnigg + Partner (Düsseldorf), ARGE Petersen BWM Architekten und Partner (Dortmund) and pmp Architekten (Munich). In addition, the jury gave recognition to the offices of Bolles + Wilson (Münster), LOOC / M (Frankfurt / Main) and Schulte-Frohlinde (Berlin) for their work. On 29 June 2011, at a joint press conference between the City of Dortmund and the DFB Football Museum, it was announced that the offices of HPP Hentrich-Petschnigg + Partner, Düsseldorf and pmp Architekten, Munich, were equally awarded first place in the international architecture competition. ARGE Petersen BWM Architects and Partners, Dortmund, achieved third place. Based on the jury's recommendation, the final winning design was determined in subsequent discussions and published on 26 September 2011 in the daily press.

=== Construction ===
Construction work on the museum began in September 2012 with the symbolic groundbreaking ceremony taking place on 20 September in the presence of DFB President Wolfgang Niersbach, Minister President of North Rhine-Westphalia Hannelore Kraft and Lord Mayor of Dortmund Ullrich Sierau. The foundation stone was laid on 29 April 2013. Among others, Niersbach, President of Borussia Dortmund Reinhard Rauball, and local politician Ute Schäfer were present. A year later, in 2014, the topping-out ceremony was celebrated. Originally intended to be completed summer 2015, due to bankruptcies of executing companies working on the project slowed construction, with the opening of the museum delayed until the fall with opening gala on 23 October 2015 and the facility opening to the public on 25 October 2015.

== Museum ==
The German Football Museum is intended to be a living place of remembrance and experience of German football history. The focus is on information about historical football events and the development of sport in all its facets as well as social and societal issues relating to football. "The museum should be designed specifically to be visitor-oriented and strive for a high quality of experience and attractiveness. It should inform, stimulate thought, surprise, touch, inspire - in one word: entertain. To do this, it uses the most modern exhibition concepts and media. "The museum is intended to serve as a "forum for encounters and discussions for [...] fans and clubs, friends and supporters, partners and sponsors". "Events such as galas and receptions, award ceremonies and press conferences". Exhibits include the shoe Mario Götze used scored the decisive goal in the 2014 World Cup final against Argentina. An unknown donor gave the maximum amount of two million euros on the evening of 6 December 2014. Götze also gave the museum his award for the goal of the decade which he scored in the 2014 World Cup final. The cultural and event program of the German Football Museum ANSTOSS deepens topics from the museum's permanent exhibition as well as from the daily debates with different formats from film and song evenings to discussion groups and readings. In February 2017, professional football manager and former player Thomas Tuchel and humanities scholar Hans Ulrich Gumbrecht lead a philosophical discussion about the beauty of the game. Since the 2017/18 season, the draws for the DFB-Pokal have been broadcast from the football museum on the Sunday after the respective cup round.

=== Exhibitions ===
- 2015: 25 Jahre Deutsche Fußball-Einheit
- 2016: 50 Jahre Wembley – Der Mythos in Momentaufnahmen
- 2017: Zwischen Erfolg und Verfolgung – Jüdische Stars im deutschen Sport bis 1933 und danach
- 2017: Herbergers Welt der Bücher – Die unbekannten Seiten der Trainer-Legende
- 2018: Schichtwechsel – FußballLebenRuhrgebiet

In 2018, as part of the celebration for Dortmund and Rostov-on-Don having been sister cities for 40 years, a statue of a winged rhinoceros was unveiled at the museum, which was to be installed on the Rostov-on-Don square after the World Cup.

=== Walk of Fame ===
On the forecourt of the museum, a Walk of Fame shows the footprints or signatures of famous German footballers.

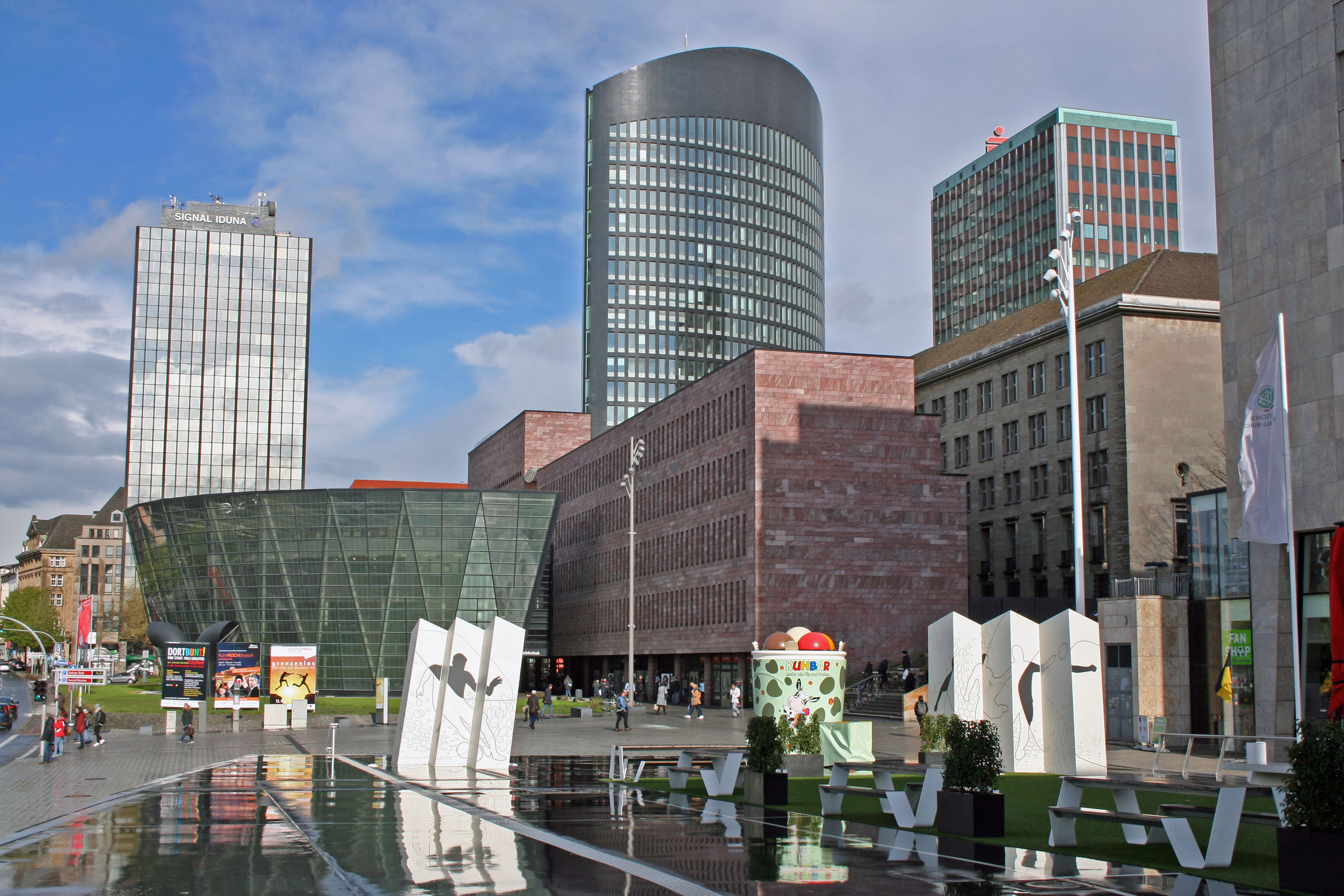
Vorplatz

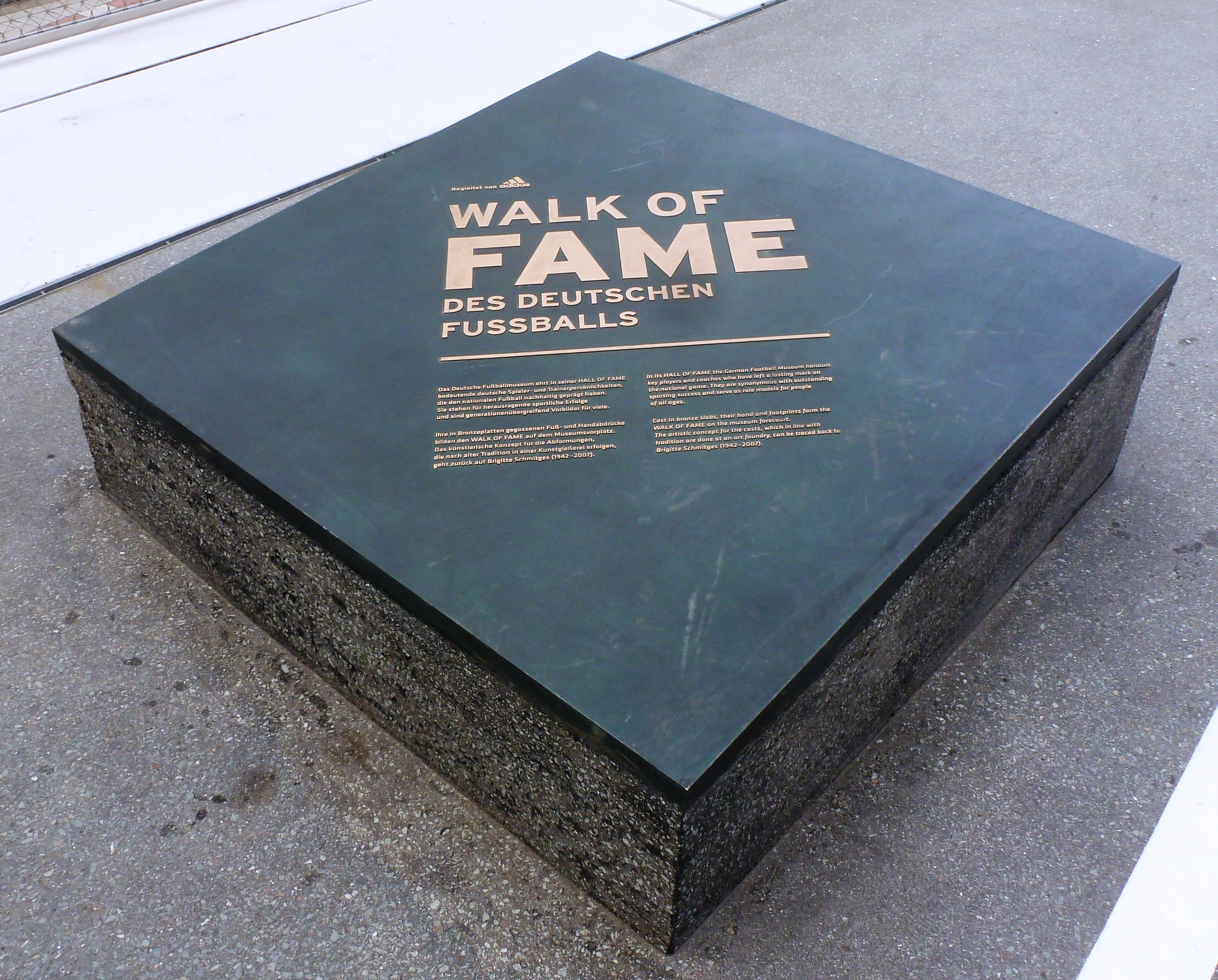
Startpunkt

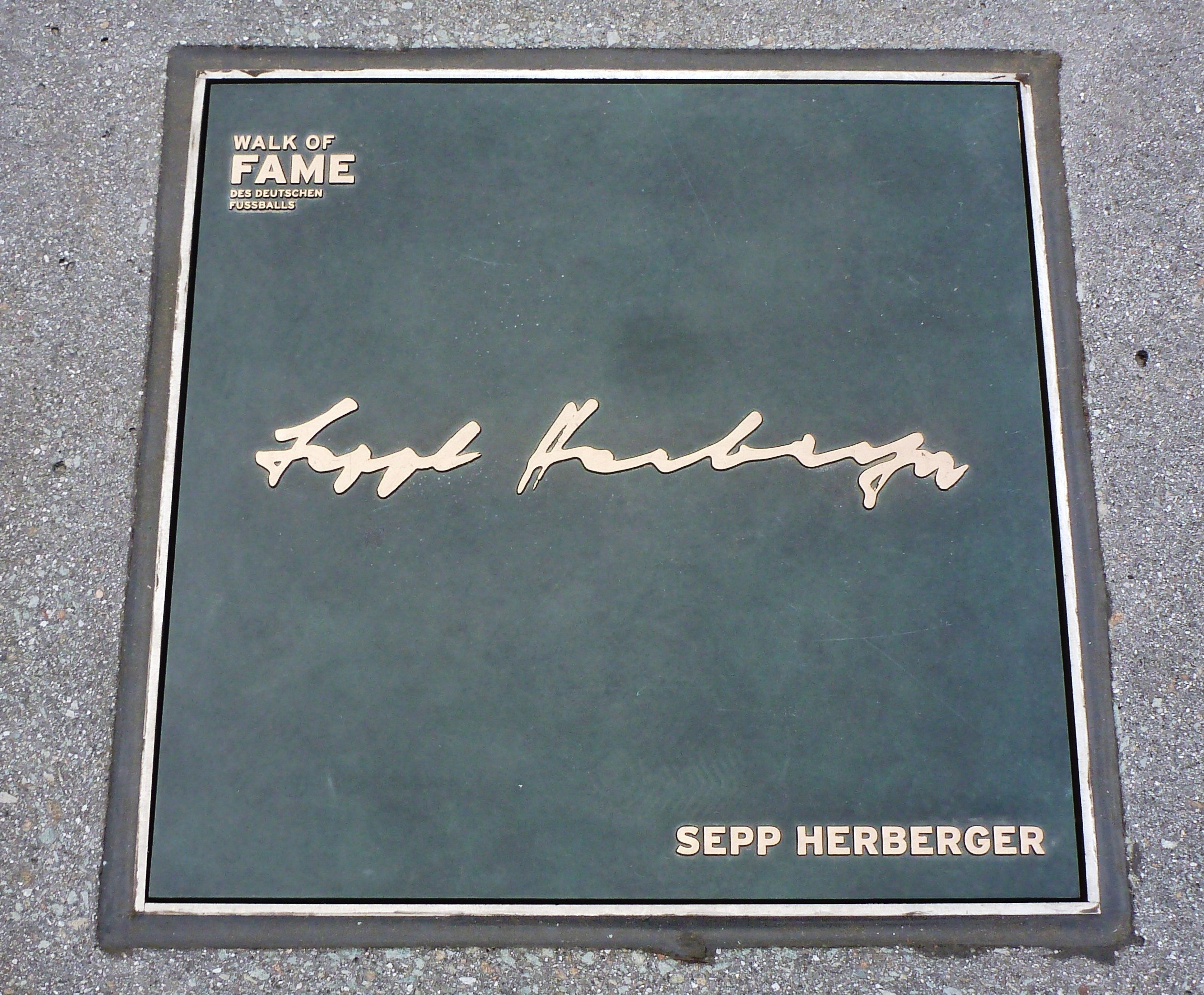
Sepp Herberger

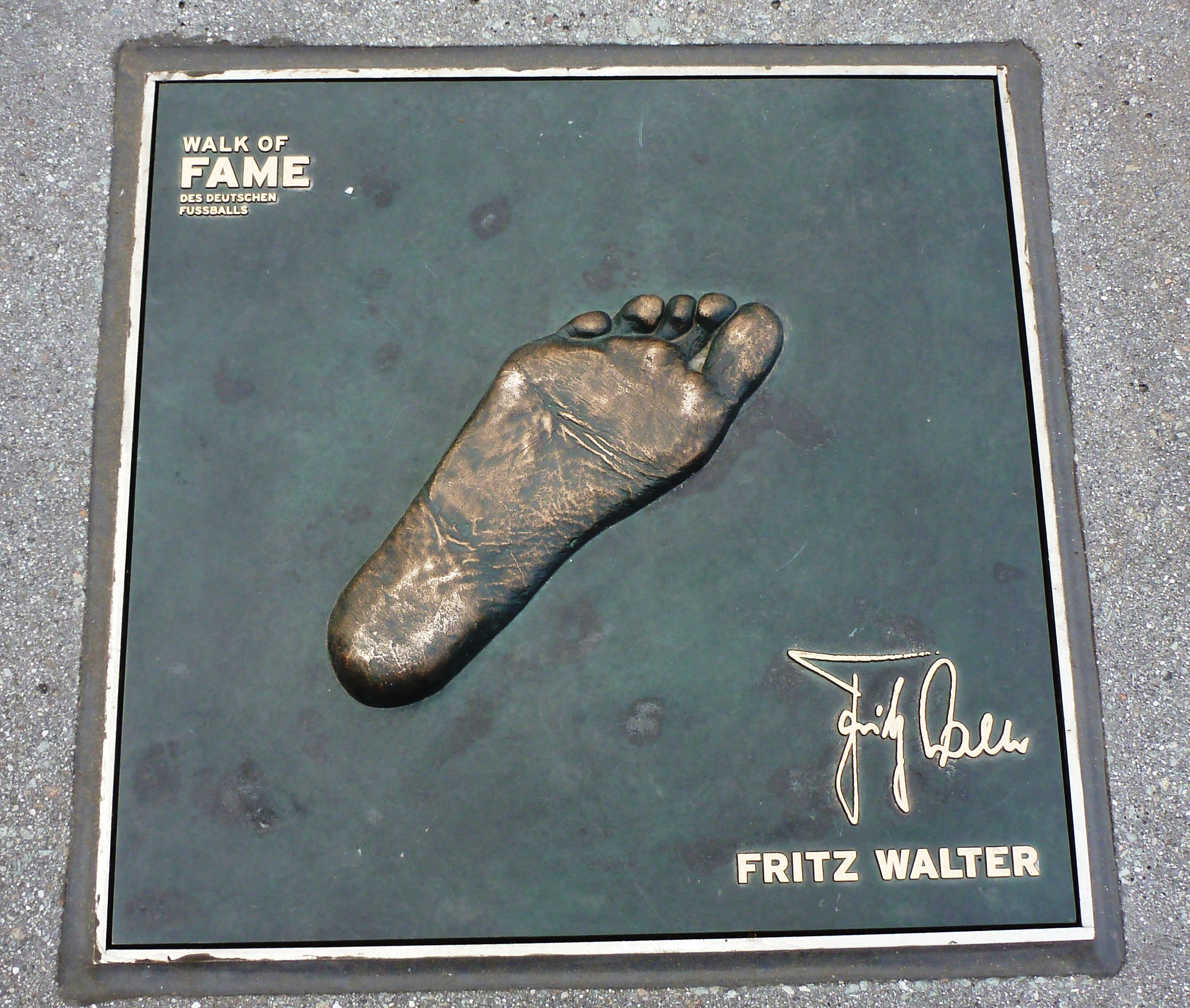
Fritz Walter

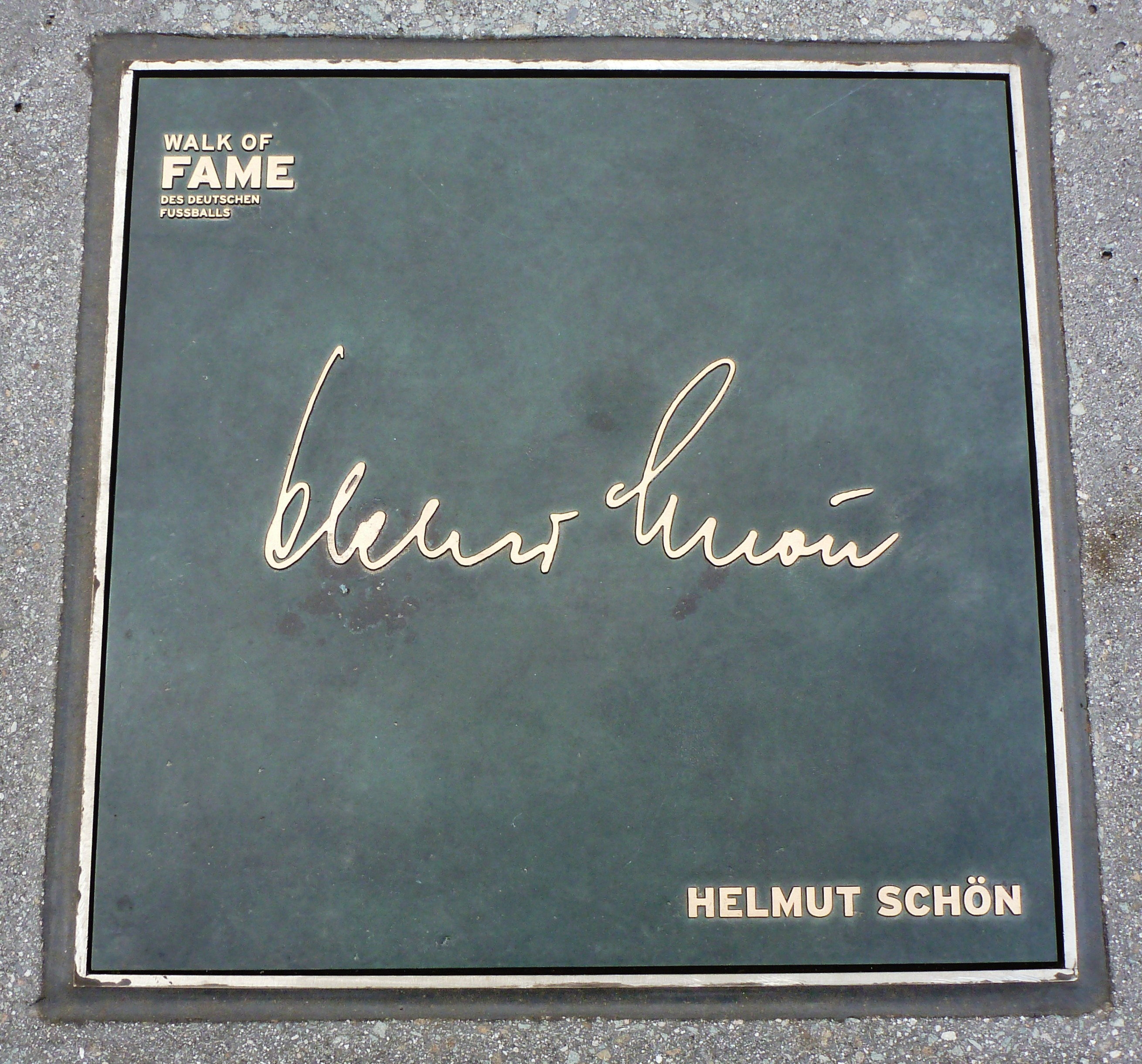
Helmut Schön

=== Hall of Fame ===
In November 2018, eleven players and a coach were selected for the new German Football Hall of Fame. In April 2019, the Hall of Fame opened as part of the house's permanent exhibition.

== Awards and recognition ==
- 2017: European Museum of the Year Award (EMYA) – Nominee
- 2017: Luigi Micheletti Award und DASA Award der European Museum Academy (EMA) – Nominee
- 2017: Location Award, Kategorie Kultur-Location für Events – Nominee
- 2018: Location Award, Kategorie Eventlocations für Incentives – Nominee

== Criticism ==
The Association of Taxpayers Germany criticized the use of public funds for a museum classing the expenditure as "too much tax money for a minor matter".

In his review Christian Wacker wrote that "most of the objects are copies, facsimiles or second objects". He also criticized the insufficient involvement of the visitors with the words "Like a provincial museum from the eighties". Alison Smale, chief correspondent of The New York Times, criticized some exhibits showing periods of German history for not providing complete perspective on certain subjects noting: "The national team from 1941 is shown with Nazi salute before the game against Sweden. A notorious propaganda film from 1944 shows the Jewish inmates in the Nazi ghetto Theresienstadt [...] playing football and allegedly leading a relaxed life. In reality, most of them were deported to Auschwitz".

High ticket prices for the museum has been the cause of complaints from fans and is cited as a contributing reason as to why the expected number of 300,000 visitors per year has not been reached.
