= Rainer Koch =

German jurist and football official (born 1958)

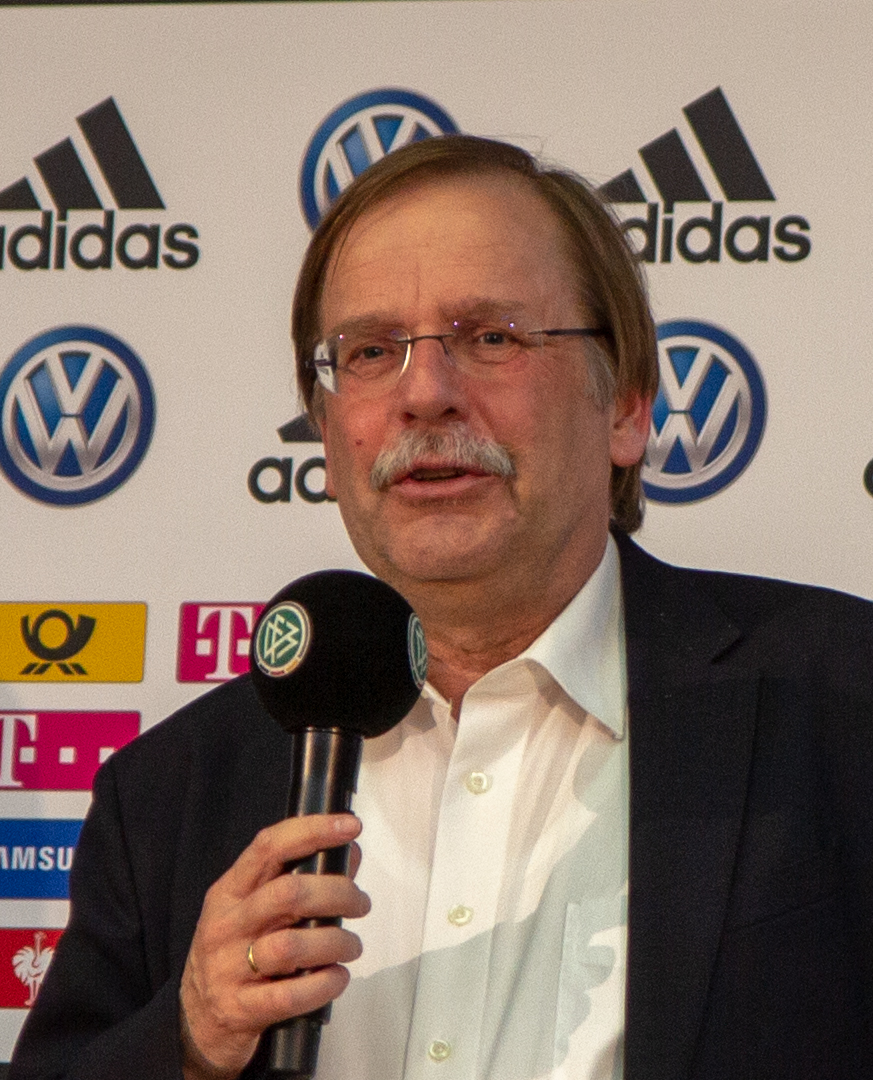
- Koch in 2019

Acting President of the DFB
- In office 17 May 2021 – 11 March 2022 Serving with Peter Peters
- Preceded by: Fritz Keller
- Succeeded by: Bernd Neuendorf
- In office 2 April 2019 – 27 September 2019 Serving with Reinhard Rauball
- Preceded by: Reinhard Grindel
- Succeeded by: Fritz Keller
- In office 9 November 2015 – 15 April 2016 Serving with Reinhard Rauball
- Preceded by: Wolfgang Niersbach
- Succeeded by: Reinhard Grindel

President of the Southern German Football Association
- Incumbent
- Assumed office 22 October 2011
- Preceded by: Rolf Hocke

President of the Bavarian Football Association
- Incumbent
- Assumed office November 2004
- Preceded by: Heinrich Schmidhuber

Personal details
- Born: 18 December 1958 (age 67) Kiel, West Germany
- Party: SPD
- Children: 1
- Education: LMU Munich
- Occupation: Jurist

Rainer Koch (born 18 December 1958) is a German jurist and football official. From November 2015 to April 2016, he was the acting president of the German Football Association along with Reinhard Rauball.

Koch is a member of UEFA's Appeals Body.

== Professional career ==
Koch completed his schooling at Wilhelmsgymnasium Munich and then did his military service. From 1979 to 1984 he studied law at LMU Munich. After receiving his doctorate, he worked in the Bavarian judicature. After working in various local courts, he worked for three years at the Saxonian University of Applied Sciences of Administration in Meissen. Koch was the deputy head of the IT authority of the Bavarian justice for several years. Since 2008, Koch has been a judge at the Oberlandesgericht Munich. Because of his diverse obligations as a sports official, he converted to a part-time job.

== Sporting career ==
=== Bavarian Football Association ===
In his youth, Koch played football for the Kirchheimer SC and for the TSV Poing. From 1977 to 1980, Koch was coach of the D and C junior teams from Kirchheimer SC. Also in Kirchheim, Koch took over head of the youth department from 1989-1990. Starting in 1975, he was a referee at the Bavarian Football Association (Bayerischer Fußball-Verband, BFV). Up to 1986, Koch refereed nearly 1,000 football matches, including some in the Bayernliga, which was then the third-highest league in Germany. From 1987 to 1989 he was an official referee observer. He also coached the A youth team of Falke Markt Schwaben. Koch acquired the coaching license B in 1982.

At the age of 24, in 1982, he was an observer in the referee committee of the football district of Munich, which he held until 1986. After a work-related break, Koch returned again in 1990 to the BFV and became chairman of the Jugend-Sportgericht (Youth Sport Court) in the district of Upper Bavaria. After six years he was assessor in the association sports court, the leading sports court in the BFV, which he chaired from 1998 until 2004. In November 2004, Koch was unanimously elected President of the Bavarian Football Association. As president, he visited the district and regional days in BFV, promoted the efforts against match fixing, and strengthened the lower divisions in the association. In the following BFV general meetings in 2006, 2010 and 2014 Koch was unanimously re-elected.

=== Southern German Football Association ===
Koch was elected in 2005 as vice president of the board of the Southern German Football Association (Süddeutscher Fußball-Verband, SFV). The SFV is made up of the football associations in Bavaria, Hesse, Baden and Württemberg. Koch is President of the SFV since 22 October 2011.

=== German Football Association ===
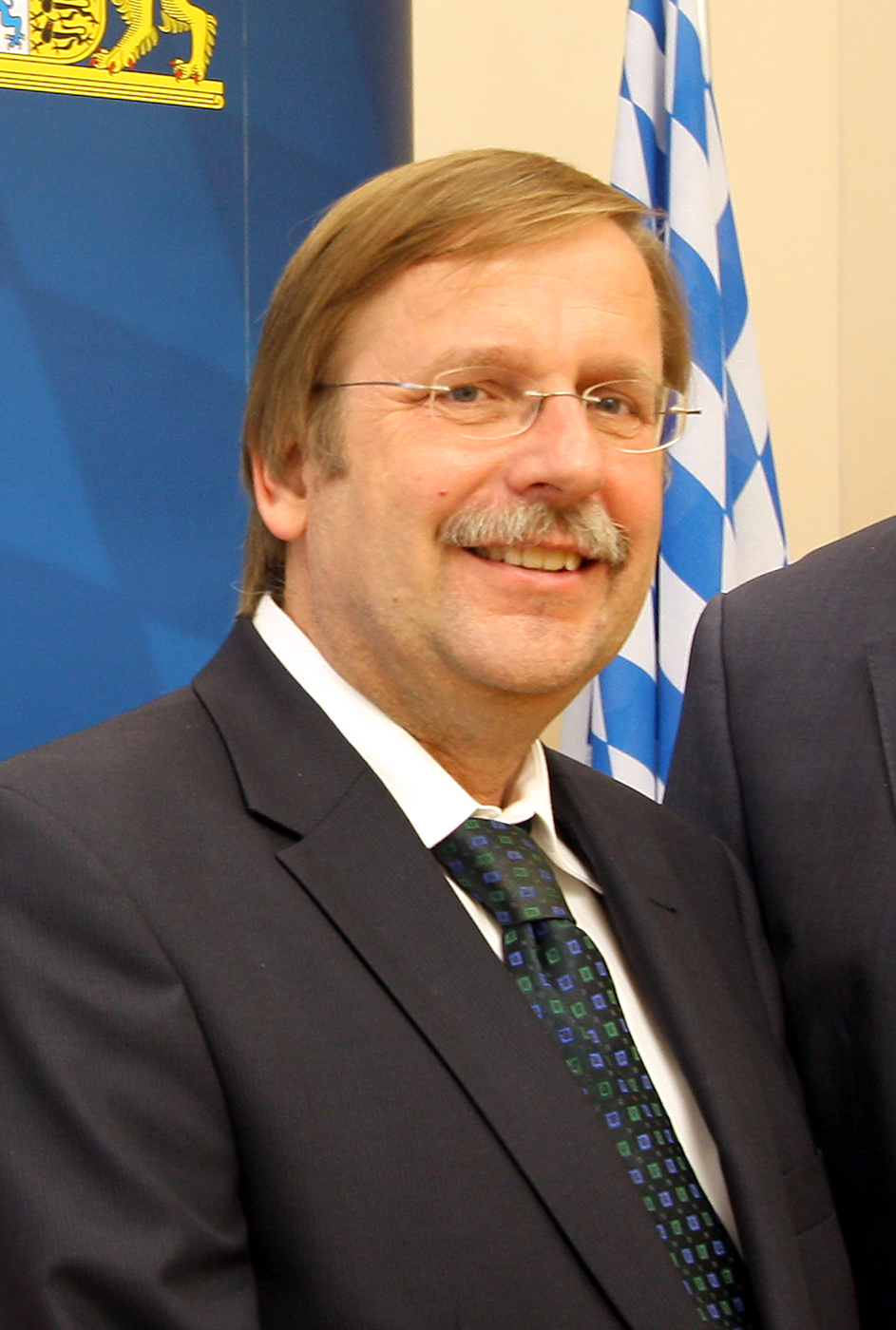
Koch in 2011

In 1996, Koch was made assessor of sports court of the German Football Association (Deutscher Fußball-Bund, DFB), to which he was elected chairman in 1998. In this position, Koch was much more involved in the investigation of the Bundesliga scandal 2005. Under his chairmanship, the court imposed the highest fines in the DFB-history for racism from football fans.

In October 2007, Koch was elected DFB vice-president and then gave up the chair of the sports court. As DFB vice-president he was involved in fighting against racism and violence in football stadiums. On 25 October 2013, Koch took over the responsibility for amateur football as 1st Vice President of the DFB board. In this capacity, he is chairman of the conference of 21 state and five regional association presidents. This conference advises the DFB Presidium, the DFB Board and the DFB central administration in all issues that affect amateur football. Following the resignation of Wolfgang Niersbach in November 2015, Koch was, along with first Vice President Reinhard Rauball, statutory acting DFB president. In connection with possible bribes before the 2006 FIFA World Cup, on 9 November 2015, Koch demanded a public announcement about the operations from Franz Beckenbauer and explained that it was absolutely necessary "that he is intensively introduced in the elucidation of the processes." Koch remained president along with Rauball until 15 April 2016.

== Politics ==
Koch runs since 1990 for the Social Democratic Party of Germany in the city council of Poing and in 2009 was a member of the Federal Convention for his party.

== Family ==
Koch is married and has a daughter.
