= Konstantin Heide =

German footballer

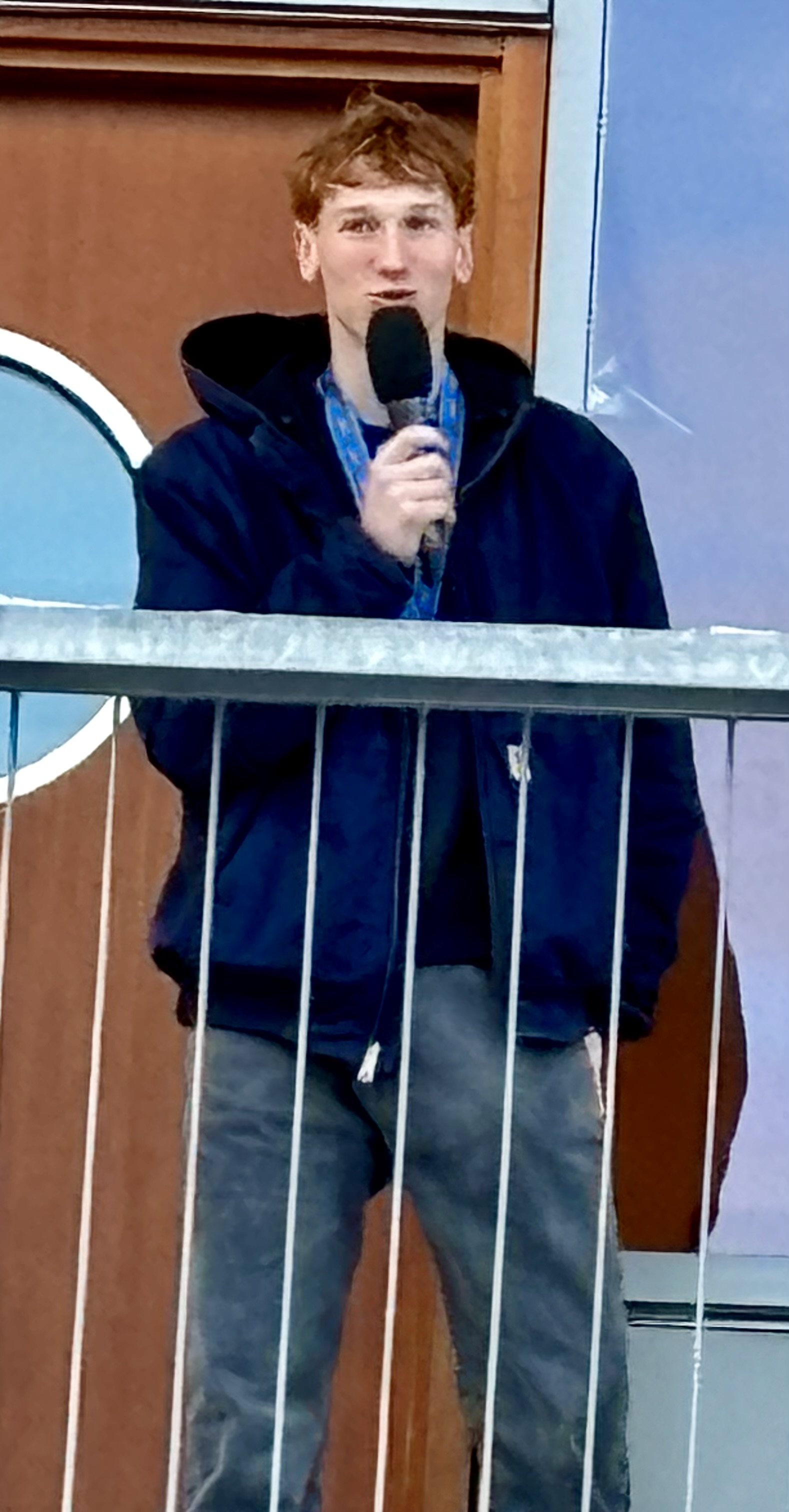
- Heide in 2024

Personal information
- Full name: Konstantin Günter Georg Heide
- Date of birth: 27 January 2006 (age 20)
- Place of birth: Kirchheim bei München, Germany
- Height: 1.89 m (6 ft 2 in)
- Position: Goalkeeper

Team information
- Current team: Hertha BSC
- Number: 13

Youth career
- 2009–2016: Kirchheimer SC
- 2016–2023: SpVgg Unterhaching

Senior career*
Years	Team	Apps	(Gls)
2023–2025	SpVgg Unterhaching	26	(0)
2024	SpVgg Unterhaching II	6	(0)
2025–	Hertha BSC	0	(0)
2025–	Hertha BSC II	24	(0)

International career^{‡}
2021–2022	Germany U16	3	(0)
2022–2023	Germany U17	3	(0)
2024	Germany U18	1	(0)
2024–2025	Germany U19	10	(0)
Medal record
Men's football
Representing Germany
FIFA U-17 World Cup
Winner	2023 Indonesia
UEFA European Under-17 Championship
Winner	2023 Hungary
- * Club domestic league appearances and goals as of 23 September 2026 ‡ National team caps and goals as of 23 June 2025

Konstantin Günter Georg Heide (born 27 January 2006) is a German professional footballer who plays as a goalkeeper for 2. Bundesliga club Hertha BSC.

== Club career ==
Heide is a youth product of Kirchheimer SC since the age of 3, before moving to SpVgg Unterhaching's youth academy in 2016. He was promoted to their senior team for the 2023–24 season in the 3. Liga. He made his senior and professional debut with Unterhaching in a 1–0 loss in the 3. Liga to MSV Duisburg on 7 October 2023.

On 22 August 2025, Heide signed a three-season contract with Hertha BSC in 2. Bundesliga.

== International career ==
Heide was first called up to represent the Germany U16s in October 2021. He was part of the Germany U17 squad that won the 2023 UEFA European Under-17 Championship. He was again called up to the U17s for the 2023 FIFA U-17 World Cup. His first game in the tournament was the semi-final against tournament favourites Argentina on 28 September 2023 after the starting goalkeeper Max Schmitt fell ill, which finished as 3–3 in regular time. In the following penalty shootout, Heide saved 2 penalties to help Germany win 4–2 and reach the final, being named man of the match in the process. He was named the starter for the final as well, and after a 2–2 draw in regular time, he again saved 2 penalties to win Germany the U-17 World Cup and another man of the match award for himself.

Heide was Germany's starting goalkeeper at the 2025 UEFA European Under-19 Championship, where they lost to Spain in the semi-finals. Heide saved a penalty kick by Antonio Cordero in the first half, Germany led 2–1 after 90 minutes before 3 goals were scored in added time for a 3–3 tie at the end of regulation, the extra time ended in a 6–5 victory for Spain.

== Honours ==
Germany U17

- UEFA European Under-17 Championship: 2023
- FIFA U-17 World Cup: 2023
