= Permanent Arbitration Court =

The Permanent Arbitration Court for clubs and corporations of the professional leagues (short form: Permanent Arbitration Court) is an arbitration tribunal between Die Liga – Fußballverband (The League - League Association), its subsidiary Deutsche Fußball Liga (DFL) and the German Football Association (German: Deutscher Fussball-Bund, DFB) on the one hand, and the clubs or corporations who are involved in the Bundesliga or 2. Bundesliga on the other hand.

== Structure ==
According to § 1 of the Arbitration Agreement (Schiedsgerichtsvertrag – SGV), the Permanent Arbitration Court decides in particular on disputes concerning admission to the two national leagues, as well as club sanctions from the DFB. The Permanent Arbitration Court can, in accordance with § 2 SGV, only be invoked by a party when a final decision was already set, be it from the legal side of the League Association, the DFL or the DFB (for example by the DFB Sports Court, or the DFB Federal Court). The Permanent Court of Arbitration makes the decision, in accordance with § 3 SGV, with the presence of a chairperson and two assessors. The acting chairman is the former judge of the Federal Constitutional Court of Germany, Udo Steiner. Arbitration decisions between the parties, in accordance with § 8 SGV, holds the same effects as a final judicial decision in court. Since the Permanent Arbitration Court is an arbitration tribunal within the meaning of §§ 1029 ff. ZPO, its arbitration decision can only be appealed before a state civil court within the limits of § 1059 par. 2 ZPO. Courts with jurisdiction, according to § 11 SGV and § 1062 par. 1 ZPO, is the Oberlandesgericht (Higher Regional Court) Frankfurt
