= Peter Peters (football administrator) =

German journalist and football official (born 1962)

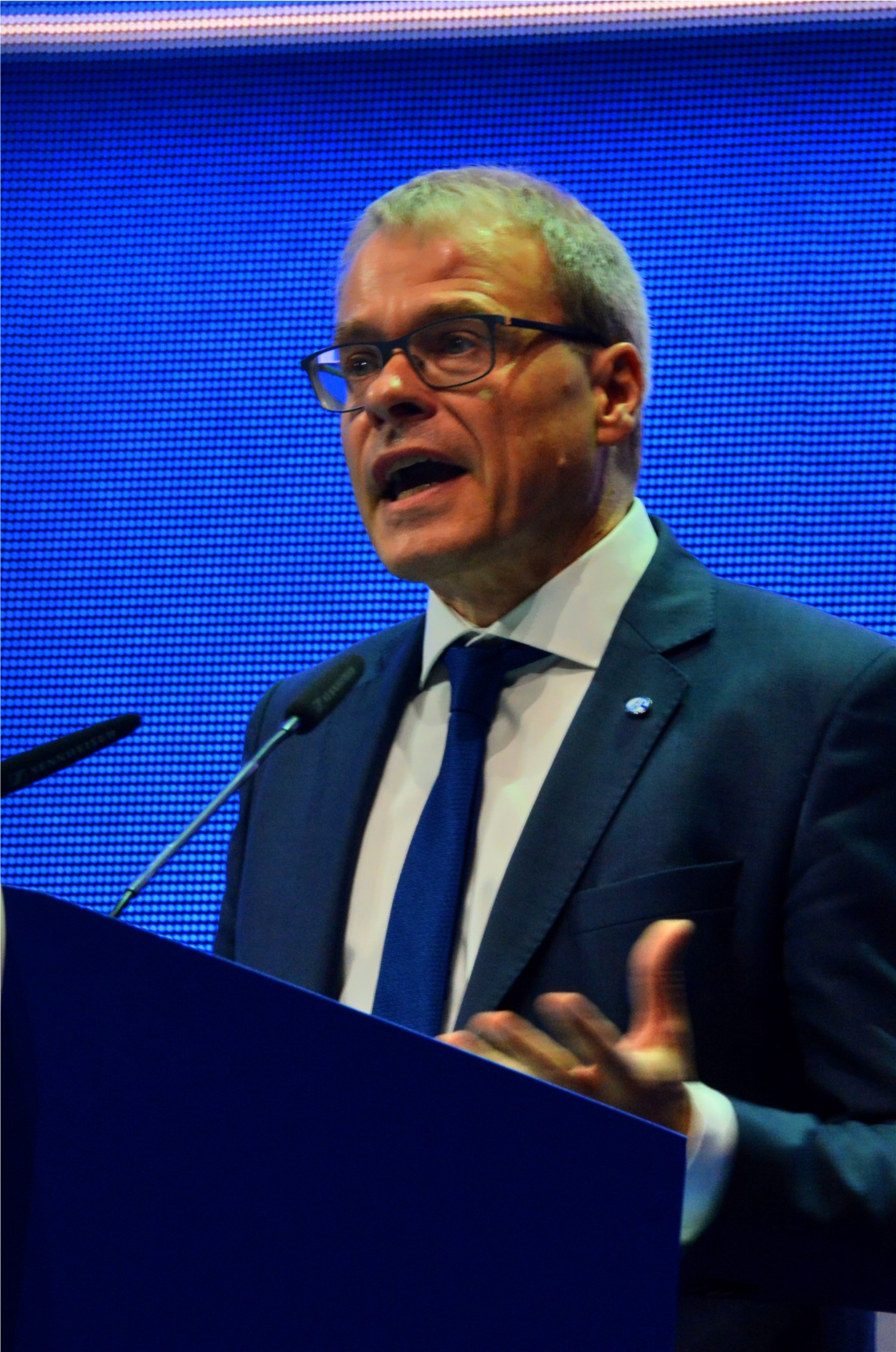
- Peters in 2017

Acting President of the DFB
- In office 17 May 2021 – 11 March 2022 Serving with Rainer Koch
- Preceded by: Fritz Keller
- Succeeded by: Bernd Neuendorf

Personal details
- Born: 21 June 1962 (age 64) Ochtendung, West Germany
- Education: Technical University of Dortmund
- Occupation: Journalist; manager

Peter Peters (born 21 June 1962) is a German journalist and football official.

== Early life ==
Peters studied business administration at the Technical University of Dortmund and completed his diploma in 1989. Before becoming a football official, he was head of the football editors for "Reviersport" magazine from 1987 to 1989, from 1989 to 1990 he volunteered at the Westfälische Rundschau and 1990 and 1991 he was sports editor of the Westdeutsche Allgemeine Zeitung. In 1991, he was Deputy Managing Director of 1. FC Kaiserslautern.

== Football official ==
In 1993 Peters became Managing Director of FC Schalke 04, and was appointed to its executive board in 1994. Since 1998, he is also managing director of "Arena-companies". In September 2012 he received a permanent contract at the club.

Besides his work at FC Schalke 04, Peters has assumed additional responsibilities. He is a member of the supervisory board of the DFL and the board of the League Association since 2004. 2006 to 2007, he was a member of UEFA's Stadium and Security Committee. During the 2006 FIFA World Cup, Peters was the CEO of the World Cup organizing committee at the Gelsenkirchen branch office. On March 15, 2007, Peters was elected deputy chairman of the supervisory board of the DFL and Vice President of the League Association. He was unanimously re-elected at the general meetings of the League Association In 2007, 2010 and 2013. As Vice-President of the League Association, he is also vice president and board member of the DFB (German:Deutscher Fussball-Bund). In addition, Peters is Chairman of the board of DFL Sports Digital and Vice Chairman of DFL Sports Enterprise. He is a member of UEFA's Club Licensing since 2011 and a board member of the Bundesliga Foundation.
