= Heinz-Günter Bargfrede =

German politician

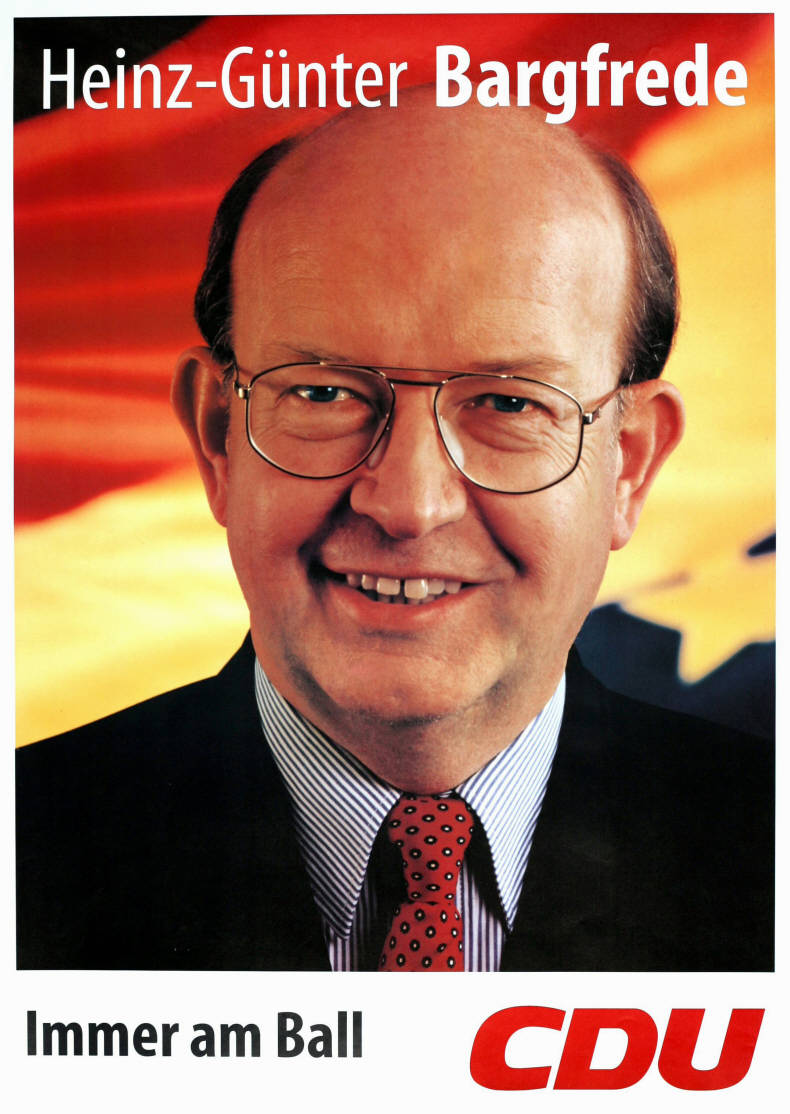
- Election poster of Bargfrede (1998)

Member of the Bundestag; for Soltau-Fallingbostel – Rotenburg II
- In office 20 December 1990 – 26 October 1998
- Preceded by: Ingeborg Hoffmann
- Succeeded by: Kurt Palis

Personal details
- Born: 20 January 1942 (age 84) Zeven, West Germany
- Party: Christian Democratic Union
- Children: 1

Heinz-Günter Bargfrede is a German politician (CDU) and former member of the Bundestag.

== Political career ==
Bargfrede joined the CDU in 1971 and was chairman of the Rotenburg municipal association from 1986 to 1990. He was a member of the German Bundestag from 20 December 1990 to 26 October 1998 (two terms). There he was a full member of the committee for transport.
