= Reinhard Rauball =

German politician

Acting President of the DFB
- In office 2 April 2019 – 27 September 2019 Serving with Rainer Koch
- Preceded by: Reinhard Grindel
- Succeeded by: Fritz Keller
- In office 9 November 2015 – 15 April 2016 Serving with Rainer Koch
- Preceded by: Wolfgang Niersbach
- Succeeded by: Reinhard Grindel

President of Borussia Dortmund
- Incumbent
- Assumed office 14 November 2004
- Preceded by: Gerd Niebaum
- In office 1984 – 1986
- Preceded by: Frank Roring
- Succeeded by: Gerd Niebaum
- In office 1979 – 1982
- Preceded by: Heinz Günther
- Succeeded by: Jürgen Vogt

CEO of Deutsche Fußball Liga e.V.
- In office 2007 – 21 August 2019
- Preceded by: Wolfgang Holzhäuser
- Succeeded by: Office abolished

Minister of Justice of North Rhine-Westphalia
- In office 1 March 1999 – 23 March 1999
- Prime Minister: Wolfgang Clement
- Preceded by: Fritz Behrens
- Succeeded by: Jochen Dieckmann

Personal details
- Born: 25 December 1946 (age 79) Northeim, Allied-occupied Germany
- Party: SPD
- Children: 2
- Education: Ruhr University Bochum
- Occupation: Lawyer

Reinhard Rauball (born 25 December 1946) is a German politician, member of the SPD, a trained lawyer, and football official. He is known for having served as president of football team Borussia Dortmund several times and also served very briefly as Minister of Justice of North Rhine-Westphalia. In addition to currently serving as president of Borussia Dortmund, he has also been President of the German Football League since August 2007. From November 2015 to April 2016, he was acting President of the German Football Association along with Rainer Koch.

Rauball played football in the late 1960s for Dortmund 95.

== Career ==
=== Lawyer ===
Rauball, son of the lawyer Johannes Rauball, studied jurisprudence at Ruhr University Bochum and earned his doctorate there in 1971.

He has worked as a lawyer at a legal firm in Dortmund since 1976. In the 1990s and 2000s he made a name for himself in particular as a sports lawyer, where he represented Katrin Krabbe, Nicole Uphoff and Graciano Rocchigiani as well as many dismissed managers from Bundesliga football clubs.

=== Politician ===
Rauball was Minister of Justice for North Rhine-Westphalia from 1 March 1999 to 8 March 1999 under Minister-President Wolfgang Clement. After just one week following his appointment to the cabinet, he was forced to resign because he had become a member of the supervisory board of US-based Eurogas in 1994 without applying for approval as required by German law.

=== Football official ===
Since 14 November 2004, Rauball has been President of Borussia Dortmund, serving his third term in that capacity. Together with Gerd Pieper and Reinhold Lunow, he forms the board of BVB. In his first term of office as president, from 1979 to 1982, as a 32-year-old he was the youngest president in Bundesliga history. He also served as president from 1984 to 1986. He is regarded as the saviour of BVB because he saved the team from bankruptcy in each of his terms as president, most recently in 2005 and 2006 in co-operation with the two managers Hans-Joachim Watzke and Thomas Treß.

Rauball succeeded the deceased Werner Hackmann as president of the German Football League in August 2007. As the only candidate, he was unanimously elected with the votes of all 36 professional clubs. He was unanimously re-elected on 18 August 2010 and on 7 August 2013.
