= German Football Association =

Governing body of association football in Germany

UEFA
- Short name: DFB
- Founded: 28 January 1900; 126 years ago in Leipzig
- Headquarters: Frankfurt
- FIFA affiliation: 21 May 1904; 122 years ago
- UEFA affiliation: 15 June 1954; 72 years ago
- President: Bernd Neuendorf
- Website: www.dfb.de

The German Football Association (German: Deutscher Fußball-Bund [ˈdɔʏtʃɐ ˈfuːsbalˌbʊnt]; DFB [ˌdeːʔɛfˈbeː]) is the governing body of football, futsal, and beach soccer in Germany. A founding member of both FIFA and UEFA, the DFB has jurisdiction for the German football league system and is in charge of the men's and women's national teams. The DFB headquarters are in Frankfurt am Main. Sole members of the DFB are the German Football League (German: Deutsche Fußball Liga; DFL), organising the professional Bundesliga and the 2. Bundesliga, along with five regional and 21 state associations, organising the semi-professional and amateur levels. The 21 state associations of the DFB have a combined number of 23,713 clubs with more than 8 million members, making the DFB the single largest sports federation in the world.

== History ==
Logo 1900 to 1926

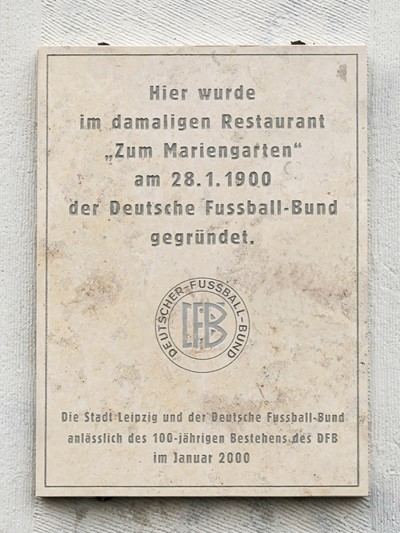
Commemorative plaque in Leipzig where the DFB was founded in 1900.

Logo 1926 to 1995

Logo 1995 to 2003

Logo 2003 to 2008

Logo 2008 to 2016

Logo 2016 to 2025

Logo since 2025

=== 1875 to 1900 ===
From 1875 to the mid-1880s, the first kind of football played in Germany was according to rugby rules. Later, association-style football teams formed separate clubs, and since 1890, they began to organise on regional and national levels.

=== 1900 to 1933 ===
The DFB (Deutscher Fußball-Bund) was founded on 28 January 1900 in Leipzig by representatives of 86 clubs. The vote held to establish the association was 62:22 in favour (84 votes). Some delegates present represented more than one club, but may have voted only once. Other delegates present did not carry their club's authority to cast a ballot. Ferdinand Hueppe, the representative of DFC Prague, was named its first president. The DFB consolidated the large number of state-based German regional competitions in play for a single recognized national title for the season 1902/03. Germans were not present in Paris when FIFA was founded by seven nations in May 1904, but by the time the FIFA statutes came into effect on 1 September, Germany had also joined by telegram as the eighth nation. The German national team played its first game in 1908.

Before 1914, the German Empire was much larger than today's Germany, comprising Alsace-Lorraine, North Schleswig and the eastern provinces. The borders of the regional associations were drawn according to suitable railway connections. Also, teams based in Bohemia, then part of Austria-Hungary, were eligible, as they were German Football clubs and thus considered German. Thus, a German team from Prague was runner-up in the German championship. On the other hand, clubs of the Danish minority in Northern Schleswig refused to join the DFB. This area after World War I voted to join Denmark. Due to border changes imposed by the Treaty of Versailles, the DFB had to adapt its structure. The Saarland, Danzig, and the Memelland were detached from Germany and East Prussia was cut off from the main part by the Polish Corridor.

=== 1933 to 1945 ===
The role of DFB and its representatives like Felix Linnemann under Nazi Germany was documented in 100 Jahre DFB and by Nils Havemann in Fußball unterm Hakenkreuz. According to Gleichschaltung policy, the DFB, with its large membership from all political sides, and strong regional structures compared to weak national ones, submitted to new rulers and new Gau structures. On a short general meeting on 9 July 1933 in Berlin, the DFB did so, at least formally.

Later, the Hitler salute was made compulsory; Marxists and Jews were expelled. The records of German Jews were erased from the DFB's records, such as those of Gottfried Fuchs who had scored a world record ten goals for Germany in a 16–0 win against Russia at the 1912 Summer Olympics in Stockholm, becoming the top scorer of the tournament and setting an international record. When, in 1972, German former player and national team coach Sepp Herberger asked the German Football Association vice president Hermann Neuberger to invite Fuchs as a guest or a guest of honour to an international against Russia on the 60th anniversary of Fuchs' performance for the German team, the DFB Executive Committee declined to do so, writing that it was not willing to invite Fuchs because it would have created an unfortunate precedent (as was pointed out, given that Fuchs was the last remaining former Jewish German international, the DFB's concern about creating a precedent was a difficult one to understand). As of 2016, Fuchs was still the top German scorer for one match.

A new organization, Deutscher Reichsbund für Leibesübungen (German Reich League for Physical Exercise), was established and Linnemann was appointed leader of its Fachamt Fußball (Football section), which took over the operational affairs, whereas the DFB lost most of its duties until it was formally dissolved in 1940.

On the pitch, Germany had done well in 1934, but after a 0–2 loss to Norway in the quarter finals of the 1936 Summer Olympics, with Adolf Hitler attending, the DFB and football fell from grace. Reichsjugendführer Baldur von Schirach and the Hitler Youth took over youth football (under 16) from the clubs following a deal with Reichssportführer Hans von Tschammer und Osten, who had been in charge of all sports in Germany since 1933, making DFB officials even more powerless. Germany had made a bid to host the 1938 World Cup, but it was withdrawn without comment.

Following the Anschluss in March 1938 that made Austria part of Germany, the Austrian Football Association became part of the German federation. New coach Sepp Herberger was told on short notice to use also Austrian players in his team, which was eliminated in the first round of the World Cup, weakening the situation of football within the Nazi politics to near meaninglessness. Four Germans (Hans Jakob, Albin Kitzinger, Ludwig Goldbrunner, and Ernst Lehner) represented West Europe in a FIFA friendly on 20 June 1937 in Amsterdam, and another two (Kitzinger again and Anderl Kupfer) represented a FIFA continental team on 26 October 1938 in London, England. During the war, Germany played international games until 1942.

=== 1945 to 1963 ===
In the aftermath of World War II, German organisations were disbanded by the allies. FIFA decided in November 1945 to ban the no longer existing DFB (and Japan's football association) from international competition, while the Austrian association was re-founded. Internationally, Germans were still represented, with Zürich-based Ivo Schricker serving as General Secretary of FIFA from 1932 to December 1950. In 1948, Switzerland requested FIFA to lift the ban on games against Germans, but this was denied. Swiss clubs played German clubs anyway, but had to cease doing so due to international protests. This was only changed in 1949 when The Football Association requested FIFA to lift the ban on club games. FIFA did so on 7 May 1949, two weeks before the Federal Republic of Germany was founded, thus games required permission by the military governments of the time. Due to partition into several occupation zones, and states, the DFB was legally re-founded in Stuttgart on 21 January 1950 only by the West German regional associations, without the Saarland Football Association in the French occupied Saarland, which on 12 June 1950 would be recognized by FIFA as the first of three German FAs after the war. At the FIFA congress held on 22 June prior to the 1950 FIFA World Cup in Brazil, the Swiss Football Association requested that the DFB be reinstated with full FIFA membership, which was granted on 22 September 1950 in Brussels. Thus, Germany was excluded from the 1950 FIFA World Cup and could resume international games only in late 1950.

In the early years of the division of Germany, West Germany claimed exclusive mandate of all of Germany. Unlike the IOC, which granted only provisional recognition to the East Germans in 1955, demanding they participate in an All-German Olympic team (United Team of Germany), FIFA fully recognized the East German Football Association in 1952. Winning the 1954 World Cup was a major success for the DFB, and the popularity of the sport in Germany.

The teams of the DFB and the Saarland played against one another in the qualifiers for the 1954 World Cup before the Saarland and its FA were permitted to rejoin Germany and the DFB in 1956.

=== 1963 to present ===
Due to that success, and due to regional associations fearing loss of influence, the old amateur structure, in which five regional leagues formed the top level, remained in effect longer than in many other countries, even though a Reichsliga had been proposed decades ago. Also, professionalism was rejected, and players who played abroad were considered "mercenaries" and not capped. The conservative attitude changed only after disappointing results in the 1962 FIFA World Cup when officials like the 75-year-old Peco Bauwens retired. According to the proposals of Hermann Neuberger, the DFB finally introduced a single nationwide professional league, the Bundesliga, for the 1963–64 season.

The DFB has hosted the World Cup in 1974 and 2006. Germany also hosted the European Championship in 1988 as well as in 2024. Upon reunification in 1990, the East German Deutscher Fußball-Verband der DDR (DFV) was absorbed into the DFB along its honours.

The national team won the World Cup for a second time in 1974, a third time in 1990, and a fourth in the 2014 FIFA World Cup. Also, they were crowned European champions three times, in 1972, in 1980 and in 1996. On top, the Mannschaft were runners-up in the 1966, 1982, 1986 and 2002 World Cups and in 1976, 1992 and 2008 European Championships, making it the second-most successful national team in the world as well as the most successful national team in Europe.

The DFB has also overseen the rise of Germany as a world power in women's football. The national team has won World Cups in 2003 and 2007—the latter without conceding a goal in the final tournament, making them the only World Cup champions for men or women to do so. Furthermore, the women's national team's victory in 2003 made Germany the only nation to have won both the Men's and Women's World Cups, until Spain achieved the same milestone in 2023. They have also won eight UEFA Women's Championships.

In 1990, mere months before reunification became official, the DFB founded the women's Bundesliga (Frauen-Bundesliga), directly modelled after the men's Bundesliga. Initially, it was played in north and south divisions but became a single league in 1997. Bundesliga teams have enjoyed more success in the UEFA Women's Champions League than those from any other nation; four different clubs have won a total of nine titles, with the most recent being 2015 champions 1. FFC Frankfurt, now known as Eintracht Frankfurt.

Since 2005, in memory of former German-Jewish Olympian international footballer Julius Hirsch who was killed in Auschwitz concentration camp during the Holocaust, the German Football Federation awards the "Julius-Hirsch-Preis" for outstanding examples of integration and tolerance within German football.

In 2020, a poll found that the unpopularity of the DFB was caused by increasing commercialization, among other reasons. An academic panel study in 2023 similarly found that the DFB had become deeply unpopular among important figures in German football, who cited reasons such as a lack of transparency, poor communication and distance from fans, and a lack of open reflection on mistakes. In 2025, its 125 year anniversary, the DFB reached more than eight million memberships.

== Competitions ==
=== Men === : Bundesliga (run by the DFL, a DFB subsidiary); 2. Bundesliga (run by the DFL, a DFB subsidiary); DFB-Pokal; 3. Liga; U19 & U17 Nachwuchsliga (former Junioren-Bundesliga); DFB-Ü-Männer-Cups; Over 32; Over 40; Over 50; DFB-Pokal der Junioren (German U19 Cup); Futsal-Bundesliga; German Futsal Youth Championships; Under 19; Under 17; Under 15; German Beach Soccer League; German Beach Soccer Championship; German Beach Soccer Tour; DFB-ePokal	=== Women === : Frauen-Bundesliga; 2. Frauen-Bundesliga; DFB-Pokal; DFB-Supercup; German Women's Futsal Championship; German Women's Youth Futsal Championship; DFB-Pokal der B-Juniorinnen (German U17 Cup); DFB-Ü 32-Frauen-Cup

== Structure ==
=== Members ===
Direct members of the DFB are only its five regional associations and its 21 state associations, along with the German Football League, whereas the clubs participating in the German football league system are members of the state associations covering their district. Today, more than 25,000 clubs are organised in those state associations, fielding nearly 170,000 teams with over two million active players and totalling over six million members, the largest membership of any single sports federation in the world. The Association governs 870,000 male members and 8,600 female teams.

=== Regional and state associations ===
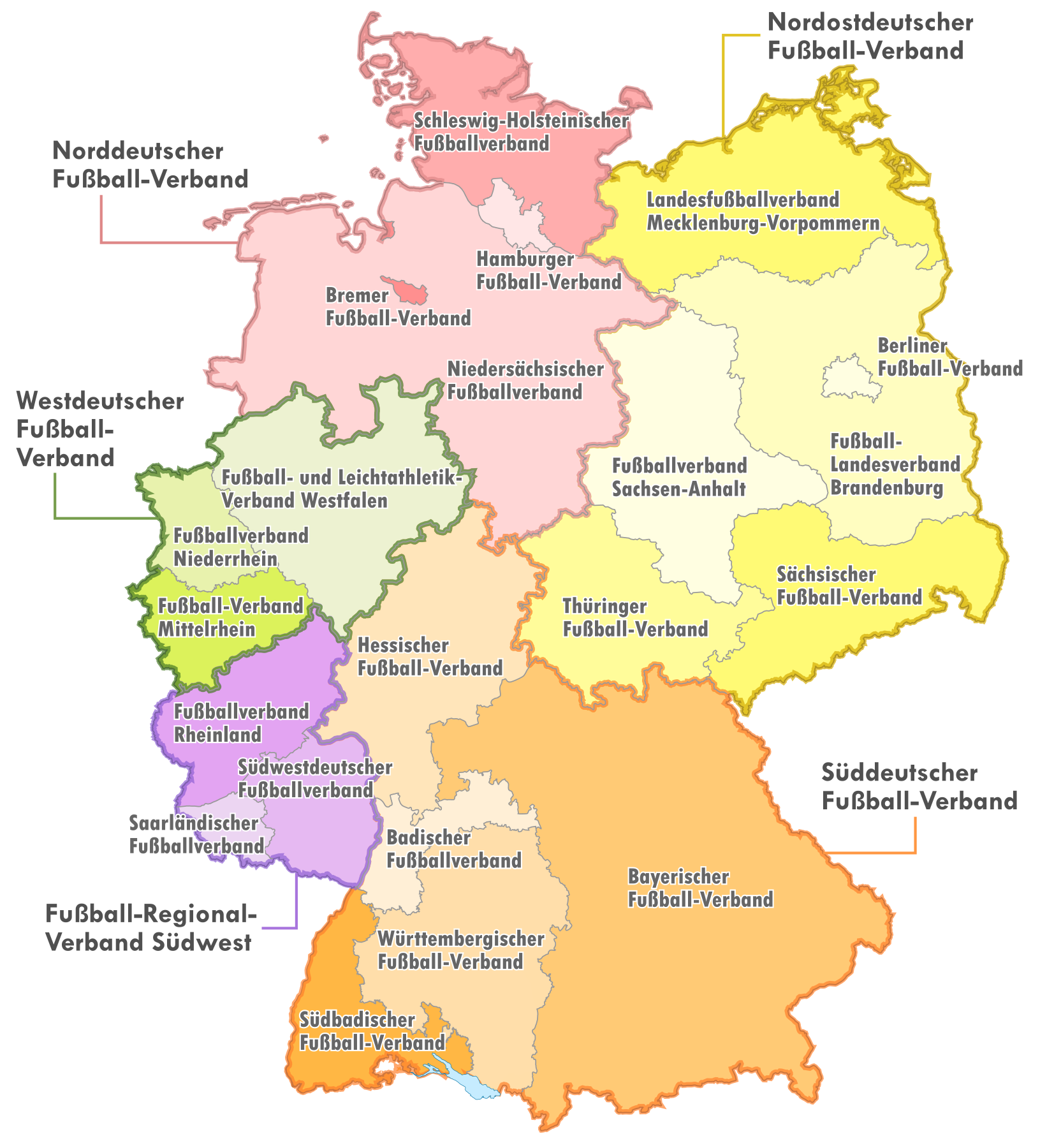
DFB, its five regional and 21 state associations

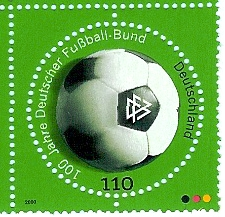
100 year commemorative stamp from 2000

The DFB is organised into five regional associations, which themselves are sub-divided into 21 state associations. These associations typically have their boundaries run along the borders of the German states, with the exception of some states (North Rhine-Westphalia, Rhineland-Palatinate, and Baden-Württemberg) having up to three state associations covering different areas of such state.

==== Southern Germany ====
The Southern German Football Association (German: Süddeutscher Fußball-Verband; SFV) covers the states of Baden-Württemberg, Bavaria and Hesse. The SFV, formed on 17 October 1897 under the name of Verband Süddeutscher Fußball-Vereine, originally administered the Southern German football championship, until it was dissolved by the Nazis in 1933. Reformed in the American occupation zone after the Second World War, it operated the Oberliga Süd, the regional division of the former top level German Oberliga until the introduction of the Bundesliga in 1963. Since the 2012–13 season, the SFV, except its member Bavarian FA, along with the Football Association of the Southwest is in charge of the Regionalliga Südwest, a step 4 division in the German football league system. The SFV itself is formed by the following state associations:

- Baden Football Association (German: Badischer Fußball-Verband; BFV)
- Bavarian Football Association (German: Bayerischer Fußball-Verband; BFV)
- Hessian Football Association (German: Hessischer Fußball-Verband; HFV)
- South Baden Football Association (German: Südbadischer Fußball-Verband; SBFV)
- Württemberg Football Association (German: Württembergischer Fußball-Verband; WFV)

==== Southwestern Germany ====
The Southwestern Regional Football Association (German: Fußball-Regional-Verband Südwest; FRVS) covers the states Rhineland-Palatinate and Saarland and was formed after the Second World War in the French occupation zone in Germany. Its highest league until the introduction of the Bundesliga in 1963 was the Oberliga Südwest, the regional division of the former top level German Oberliga. Since the 2012–13 season, the FRVS, along with the Southern German football association is in charge of Regionalliga Südwest, a step 4 division in the German football league system. Additionally, the FRVS administers the Oberliga Rheinland-Pfalz/Saar, a step 5 division. The FRVS itself is formed by the following state associations:

- Rhineland Football Association (German: Fußball-Verband Rheinland; FVR)
- Saarland Football Association (German: Saarländischer Fußball-Verband; SFV)
- Southwest German Football Association (German: Südwestdeutscher Fußball-Verband; SWFV)

==== Western Germany ====
The Western German Football Association (German: Westdeutscher Fußballverband; WDFV) covers the state of North Rhine-Westphalia. The association was known as WFLV from 2002 to 2016 and used to administer the Western German football championship until 1933. From 1947 to 1963, its highest league was the Oberliga West, the regional division of the former top level German Oberliga. Since the 2008–09 season, the WDFV is in charge of the Regionalliga West, a step 4 division in the German football league system. The WDFV itself is formed by the following state associations:

- Middle Rhine Football Association (German: Fußballverband Mittelrhein; FVM)
- Lower Rhine Football Association (German: Fußballverband Niederrhein; FVN)
- Westphalia Football and Athletics Association (German: Fußball- und Leichtathletikverband Westfalen; FLVW)

==== Northern Germany ====
The Northern German Football Association (German: Norddeutscher Fußball-Verband; NFV) covers the states of Bremen, Hamburg, Lower Saxony and Schleswig-Holstein. The association used to administer the Northern German football championship until 1933. From 1947 to 1963, its highest league was the Oberliga Nord, the regional division of the former top level German Oberliga. Since the 1994–95 season, the NFV is in charge of the Regionalliga Nord, a step 4 division in the German football league system. The NFV itself is formed by the following state associations:

- Bremen Football Association (German: Bremer Fußball-Verband; BFV)
- Hamburg Football Association (German: Hamburger Fußball-Verband; HFV)
- Lower Saxony Football Association (German: Niedersächsischer Fußball-Verband; NFV)
- Schleswig-Holstein Football Association (German: Schleswig-Holsteinischer Fußball-Verband; SHFV)

==== Northeastern Germany ====
The Northeastern German Football Association (German: Nordostdeutscher Fußball-Verband; NOFV) covers the states of Berlin, Brandenburg, Mecklenburg-Western Pomerania, Saxony, Saxony-Anhalt and Thuringia. The association is the youngest of the five regional associations, having been formed after German reunification in 1990 as a successor of the disbanded German Football Association of the GDR. Since the 2012–13 season and previously from 1994 to 2000, the NOFV administers the Regionalliga Nordost, a step 4 division in the German football league system, and the step 5 Oberliga Nordost. The NOFV itself is formed by the following state associations:

- Brandenburg State Football Association (German: Fußball-Landesverband Brandenburg; FLB)
- Berlin Football Association (German: Berliner Fußball-Verband; BFV)
- Mecklenburg-Vorpommern State Football Association (German: Landesfußball-Verband Mecklenburg-Vorpommern; LFVM)
- Saxony Football Association (German: Sächsischer Fußball-Verband; SFV)
- Saxony-Anhalt Football Association (German: Fußball-Verband Sachsen-Anhalt; FSA)
- Thuringian Football Association (German: Thüringer Fußball-Verband; TFV)

=== Presidents ===
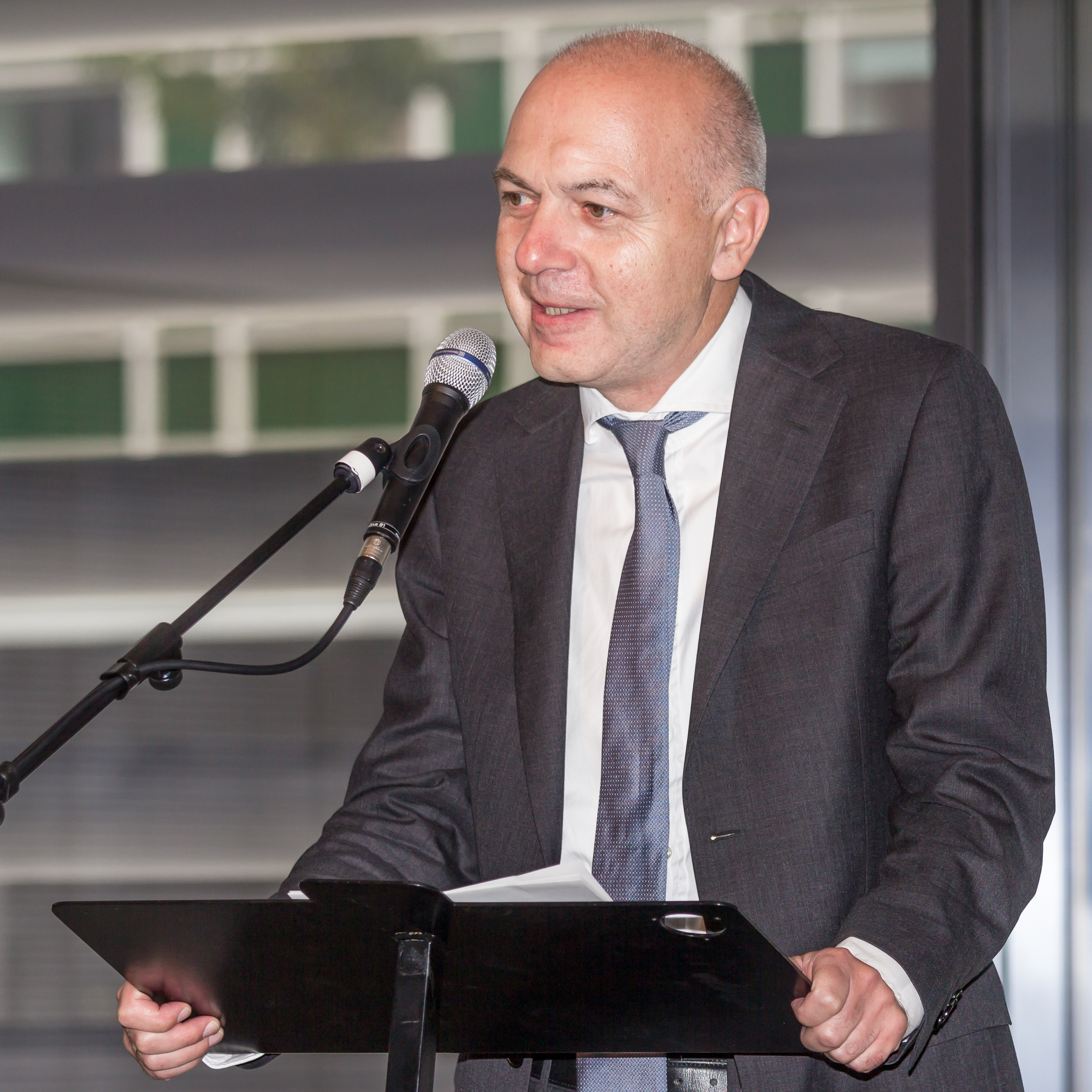
President Bernd Neuendorf, in charge since 2022

- Ferdinand Hueppe (1900–1904)
- Friedrich Wilhelm Nohe (1904–1905)
- Gottfried Hinze (1905–1925)
- Felix Linnemann (1925–1940)
- Peco Bauwens (1950–1962)
- Hermann Gösmann (1962–1975)
- Hermann Neuberger (1975–1992, died in office)
- Egidius Braun (1992–2001)
- Gerhard Mayer-Vorfelder (2001–2004)
- Gerhard Mayer-Vorfelder and Theo Zwanziger (2004–2006)
- Theo Zwanziger (2006–2012)
- Wolfgang Niersbach (2012–2015)
- Acting: Rainer Koch and Reinhard Rauball (2015–2016)
- Reinhard Grindel (2016–2019)
- Acting: Rainer Koch and Reinhard Rauball (2019)
- Fritz Keller (2019–2021)
- Acting: Rainer Koch and Peter Peters (2021–2022)
- Bernd Neuendorf (2022–present)

=== Administration ===
DFB Administration is located in Frankfurt (Main). It is headed by Secretary General Friedrich Curtius and managing directors Heike Ullrich (Deputy Secretary General), Oliver Bierhoff and Markus Holzherr.

== Men's honours ==
=== Major competitions ===
FIFA World Cup

- Champions (4): 1954, 1974, 1990, 2014
- Runners-Up (4): 1966, 1982, 1986, 2002
- Third Place (4): 1934, 1970, 2006, 2010
- Fourth Place (1): 1958

UEFA European Championship

- Champions (3): 1972, 1980, 1996
- Runners-Up (3): 1976, 1992, 2008
- Third Place (3): 1988, 2012, 2016

Summer Olympic Games

- Gold Medal (1): 1976
- Silver Medal (2): 1980, 2016
- Bronze Medal (3): 1964, 1972, 1988
- Fourth Place (1): 1952

FIFA Confederations Cup

- Champions (1): 2017
- Third Place (1): 2005

UEFA Nations League

- Fourth Place (1): 2024–25

Overview
Event	1st place	2nd place	3rd place	4th place
FIFA World Cup	4	4	4	1
UEFA European Championship	3	3	3	0
Summer Olympic Games	1	2	3	1
FIFA Confederations Cup	1	0	1	0
UEFA Nations League	0	0	0	1
Total	9	9	11	3

== Women's honours ==
=== Major competitions ===
FIFA Women's World Cup

- Champions (2): 2003, 2007
- Runners-Up (1): 1995
- Fourth Place (2): 1991, 2015

UEFA Women's European Championship

- Champions (8): 1989, 1991, 1995, 1997, 2001, 2005, 2009, 2013
- Runners-Up (1): 2022
- Fourth Place (1): 1993

Summer Olympic Games

- Gold Medal (1): 2016
- Bronze Medal (4): 2000, 2004, 2008, 2024

UEFA Women's Nations League

- Runners-Up (1): 2025
- Third Place (1): 2024

Overview
Event	1st place	2nd place	3rd place	4th place
FIFA Women's World Cup	2	1	0	2
UEFA Women's European Championship	8	1	0	1
Summer Olympic Games	1	0	4	0
UEFA Women's Nations League	0	1	1	0
Total	11	3	5	3

== DFB mascot ==
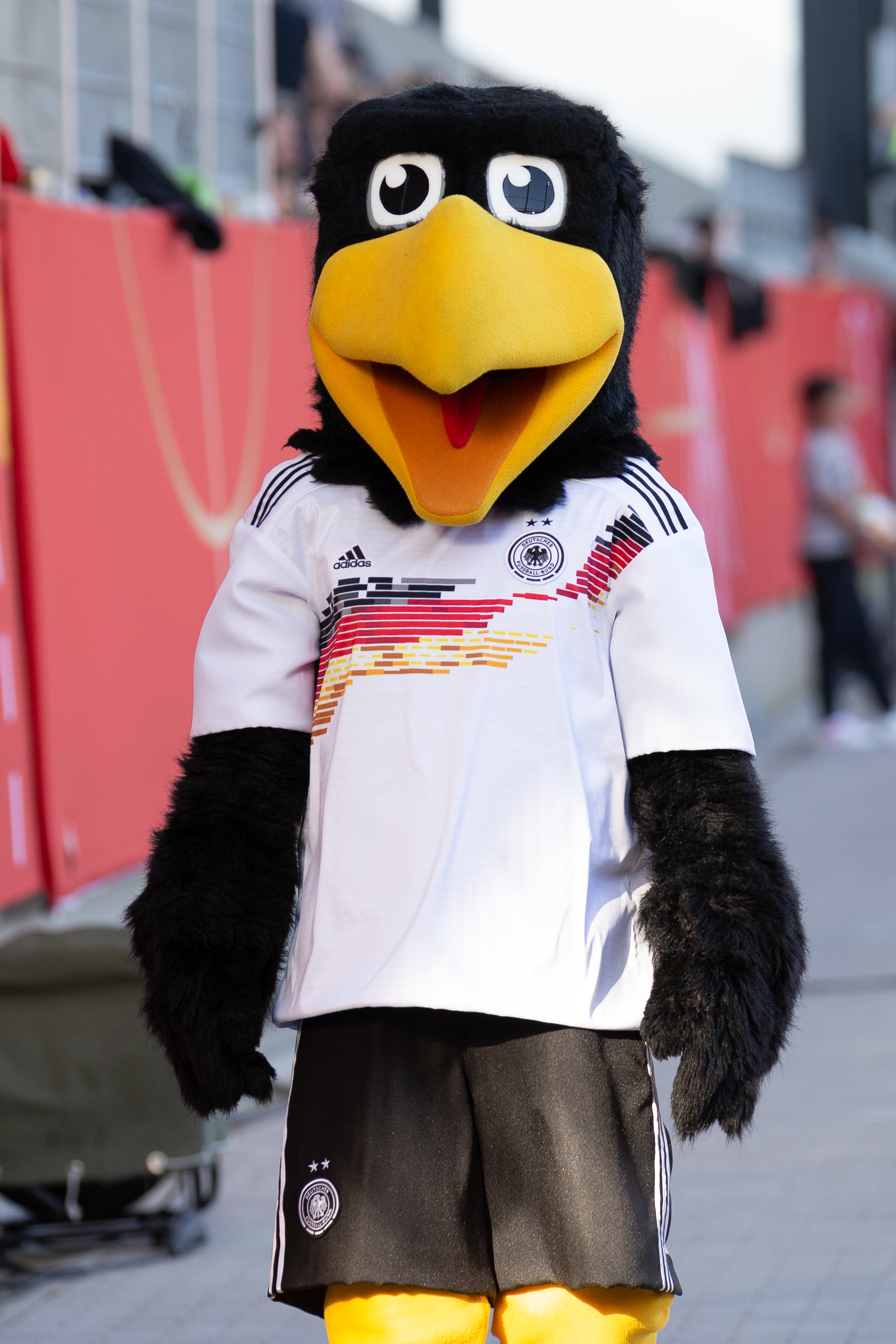
Mascot Paule (2019)

The official mascot is an eagle with black feathers and a yellow beak called "Paule" (since 26 March 2006).

== DFB Play ==
DFB Play
- Website type: OTT streaming platform
- Available in: English
- Headquarters: Frankfurt, Germany
- Country of origin: Germany
- Area served: Germany
- Owner: DFB
- Website: dfbplay.tv
- Registration: Required
- Launched: 2023
- Current status: Active

DFB Play is a free Over-The-Top (OTT) streaming platform created by the German Football Association (Deutscher Fußball-Bund e.V.) that provides live coverage, highlights, and on-demand content for the DFB-Pokal (German Cup) and other German football competitions.

=== Competitions ===
- DFB-Pokal
- 3. Liga
- Frauen-Bundesliga
- DFB-Pokal Frauen

== See also ==
- German football league system
- German Football Museum
- History of German football
- DFB Sports Court
- DFB-Bundestag
- Permanent Arbitration Court
