= Rotenburg I – Heidekreis =

Federal electoral district of Germany

35 Rotenburg I – Heidekreis
- Former electoral district for the Bundestag
- Rotenburg I – Heidekreis in 2025
- State: Lower Saxony
- Population: 215,800 (2019)
- Electorate: 168,927 (2021)
- Major settlements: Walsrode; Soltau; Rotenburg an der Wümme
- Area: 2,734.5 km^{2}

Former electoral district
- Created: 1980; 2009 (re-established)
- Abolished: 2002
- Party: SPD
- Member: Lars Klingbeil
- Elected: 2017, 2021, 2025

Rotenburg I – Heidekreis is an electoral constituency (German: Wahlkreis) represented in the Bundestag. It elects one member via first-past-the-post voting. Under the current constituency numbering system, it is designated as constituency 35. It is located in northern Lower Saxony, comprising the Heidekreis district and the southern part of the Rotenburg district.

Rotenburg I – Heidekreis was created for the 1980 federal election. It was abolished in 2002 and re-established in the 2009 federal election. Since 2017, it has been represented by Lars Klingbeil of the Social Democratic Party (SPD).

== Geography ==
Rotenburg I – Heidekreis is located in northern Lower Saxony. As of the 2021 federal election, it comprises the entirety of the Heidekreis district, as well as the municipalities of Rotenburg an der Wümme, Scheeßel, and Visselhövede and the Samtgemeinden of Bothel, Fintel, and Sottrum from the Rotenburg district.

== History ==
Rotenburg I – Heidekreis was created in 1980, then known as Soltau – Rotenburg. In its first incarnation, it was constituency 30 in the numbering system. Originally, the constituency comprised the districts of Soltau-Fallingbostel and Rotenburg. In the 1987 election, it was renamed Soltau-Fallingbostel – Rotenburg II. It was abolished in the 2002 election, and divided between the new constituencies of Rotenburg – Verden and Soltau-Fallingbostel – Winsen L.

The constituency was re-established in the 2009 election, acquiring the name Rotenburg I – Soltau-Fallingbostel. It was constituency number 36. In the 2013 election, it was renamed to Rotenburg I – Heidekreis and became constituency number 34. Its borders have not changed since its re-establishment.

Election	No.	Name	Borders
1980	30	Soltau – Rotenburg	Soltau-Fallingbostel district; Rotenburg district
1983	30	Soltau – Rotenburg	Soltau-Fallingbostel district; Rotenburg district
1987	30	Soltau-Fallingbostel – Rotenburg II	Soltau-Fallingbostel district; Rotenburg district
1990	30	Soltau-Fallingbostel – Rotenburg II	Soltau-Fallingbostel district; Rotenburg district
1994	30	Soltau-Fallingbostel – Rotenburg II	Soltau-Fallingbostel district; Rotenburg district
1998	30	Soltau-Fallingbostel – Rotenburg II	Soltau-Fallingbostel district; Rotenburg district
2002	Abolished		
2005	Abolished		
2009	36	Rotenburg I – Soltau-Fallingbostel	Heidekreis district; Rotenburg district (only Rotenburg an der Wümme, Scheeßel, and Visselhövede municipalities and Bothel, Fintel, and Sottrum Samtgemeinden)
2013	34	Rotenburg I – Heidekreis	Heidekreis district; Rotenburg district (only Rotenburg an der Wümme, Scheeßel, and Visselhövede municipalities and Bothel, Fintel, and Sottrum Samtgemeinden)
2017	34	Rotenburg I – Heidekreis	Heidekreis district; Rotenburg district (only Rotenburg an der Wümme, Scheeßel, and Visselhövede municipalities and Bothel, Fintel, and Sottrum Samtgemeinden)
2021	34	Rotenburg I – Heidekreis	Heidekreis district; Rotenburg district (only Rotenburg an der Wümme, Scheeßel, and Visselhövede municipalities and Bothel, Fintel, and Sottrum Samtgemeinden)
2025	34	Rotenburg I – Heidekreis	Heidekreis district; Rotenburg district (only Rotenburg an der Wümme, Scheeßel, and Visselhövede municipalities and Bothel, Fintel, and Sottrum Samtgemeinden)

== Members ==
The constituency was first held by Ingeborg Hoffmann of the Christian Democratic Union (CDU), who served from 1980 until 1990. She was succeeded by fellow CDU member Heinz-Günter Bargfrede, who served until 1998. In 1998, Kurt Palis of the Social Democratic Party (SPD) won the constituency, serving until its abolition in the next Bundestag term. After its re-establishment in the 2009 election, Reinhard Grindel of the CDU won the constituency and served two terms. In 2017, Lars Klingbeil was elected as representative.

Election	Member	Party	%
1980	Ingeborg Hoffmann	CDU	47.0
1983	Ingeborg Hoffmann	CDU	53.9
1987	Ingeborg Hoffmann	CDU	49.2
1990	Heinz-Günter Bargfrede	CDU	50.9
1994	Heinz-Günter Bargfrede	CDU	49.6
1998	Kurt Palis	SPD	47.0
Abolished (2002–2009)
2009	Reinhard Grindel	CDU	40.2
2013	Reinhard Grindel	CDU	44.8
2017	Lars Klingbeil	SPD	41.2
2021	Lars Klingbeil	SPD	47.6
2025	Lars Klingbeil	SPD	42.1

== Election results ==
=== 2025 election ===
Federal election (2025): Rotenburg I – Heidekreis
Notes:	Blue background denotes the winner of the electorate vote. Pink background denotes a candidate elected from their party list. Yellow background denotes an electorate win by a list member, or other incumbent. A ✓ or ✗ denotes status of any incumbent, win or lose respectively.						
Party	Candidate	Votes	%	±%	Party votes	%	±%
SPD	✓ Lars Klingbeil	58,184	42.1	▼5.5	34,349	24.8	▼10.0
CDU	Vivian Tauschwitz	37,770	27.3	▲1.0	38,933	28.1	▲3.0
AfD	Omid Najafi	26,667	19.3	▲11.9	27,466	19.8	▲11.8
Greens	Canina Ruzicka	7,411	5.4	▼2.7	12,795	9.2	▼4.3
Left					9,777	7.1	▲4.2
FDP	Gurdan Kerti	3,261	2.4	▼3.6	5,118	3.7	▼6.4
BSW					4,762	3.4	
Tierschutzpartei					1,695	1.2	▼0.2
FW	Günter Scheunemann	2,923	2.1	▼0.1	1,329	1.0	▼0.2
Volt	Malte Büch	2,036	1.5		998	0.7	▲0.4
PARTEI					591	0.4	▼0.4
dieBasis					295	0.2	▼0.7
Pirates					203	0.1	▼0.2
BD					169	0.1	
Humanists					89	0.1	0.0
MLPD					20	0.0	0.0
Informal votes		1,141			803		
Total valid votes		138,252			138,590		
Turnout		139,393	82.9	▲8.9			
SPD hold	Majority	20,414	14.8	▼6.4			

=== 2021 election ===
Federal election (2021): Rotenburg I – Heidekreis
Notes:	Blue background denotes the winner of the electorate vote. Pink background denotes a candidate elected from their party list. Yellow background denotes an electorate win by a list member, or other incumbent. A ✓ or ✗ denotes status of any incumbent, win or lose respectively.						
Party	Candidate	Votes	%	±%	Party votes	%	±%
SPD	✓ Lars Klingbeil	59,131	47.6	▲6.4	43,196	34.8	▲7.6
CDU	Carsten Büttinghaus	32,720	26.4	▼9.7	31,119	25.1	▼12.7
Greens	Michael Kopatz	10,035	8.1	▲3.3	16,857	13.6	▲5.6
AfD	Volker Körlin	9,182	7.4	▼0.8	9,945	8.0	▼1.2
FDP	Alexander Künzle	7,354	5.9	▲1.4	12,526	10.1	▲1.6
Left	Kathrin Otte	3,010	2.4	▼1.7	3,536	2.8	▼3.0
Tierschutzpartei					1,754	1.4	▲0.5
FW	Günter Scheunemann	2,734	2.2	▲1.1	1,433	1.2	▲0.5
dieBasis					1,192	1.0	
PARTEI					1,057	0.9	▲0.2
Pirates					444	0.4	0.0
Volt					341	0.3	
NPD					186	0.1	▼0.2
Team Todenhöfer					180	0.1	
ÖDP					107	0.1	0.0
Humanists					94	0.1	
V-Partei3					90	0.1	0.0
du.					74	0.1	
LKR					42	0.0	
DKP					17	0.0	0.0
MLPD					14	0.0	0.0
Informal votes		934			896		
Total valid votes		124,166			124,204		
Turnout		125,100	74.1	▼1.5			
SPD hold	Majority	26,411	21.2	▲16.1			

=== 2017 election ===
Federal election (2017): Rotenburg I – Heidekreis
Notes:	Blue background denotes the winner of the electorate vote. Pink background denotes a candidate elected from their party list. Yellow background denotes an electorate win by a list member, or other incumbent. A ✓ or ✗ denotes status of any incumbent, win or lose respectively.						
Party	Candidate	Votes	%	±%	Party votes	%	±%
SPD	Lars Klingbeil	51,938	41.2	▲0.6	34,211	27.1	▼4.1
CDU	Kathrin Rösel	45,510	36.1	▼8.7	47,558	37.7	▼5.9
AfD	Michael Stewart	10,331	8.2		11,671	9.3	▲5.5
Greens	Ellen Gause	6,053	4.8	▼0.2	10,068	8.0	▼0.5
FDP	Hendrik Jürgens	5,659	4.5	▲2.8	10,699	8.5	▲4.4
Left	Agnes Hasenjäger	5,219	4.1	▲0.2	7,422	5.9	▲1.3
FW	Günter Scheunemann	1,387	1.1	0.0	770	0.6	0.0
Tierschutzpartei					1,145	0.9	▲0.1
PARTEI					877	0.7	
NPD					447	0.4	▼0.7
Pirates					396	0.3	▼1.1
DM					219	0.2	
BGE					188	0.1	
DiB					138	0.1	
V-Partei³					137	0.1	
ÖDP					114	0.1	
MLPD					34	0.0	0.0
DKP					10	0.0	
Informal votes		974			967		
Total valid votes		126,097			126,104		
Turnout		127,071	75.6	▲2.4			
SPD gain from CDU	Majority	6,428	5.1				

=== 2013 election ===
Federal election (2013): Rotenburg I – Heidekreis
Notes:	Blue background denotes the winner of the electorate vote. Pink background denotes a candidate elected from their party list. Yellow background denotes an electorate win by a list member, or other incumbent. A ✓ or ✗ denotes status of any incumbent, win or lose respectively.						
Party	Candidate	Votes	%	±%	Party votes	%	±%
CDU	✓ Reinhard Grindel	54,448	44.8	▲4.6	53,163	43.6	▲8.5
SPD	Lars Klingbeil	49,301	40.6	▲5.3	38,018	31.2	▲3.6
Greens	Hans-Peter Ludewig	6,026	5.0	▼2.6	10,332	8.5	▼1.6
Left	Lennart Onken	4,758	3.9	▼3.0	5,572	4.6	▼3.5
FDP	Henrik Schröder	2,097	1.7	▼6.5	4,930	4.0	▼10.0
AfD					4,586	3.8	
Pirates	Stefan Scharringhausen	1,875	1.5		1,722	1.4	▼0.5
NPD	Ingo Rüdiger Helge	1,617	1.3	▼0.4	1,275	1.0	▼0.5
FW	Günter Scheunemann	1,384	1.1		796	0.7	
Tierschutzpartei					1,028	0.8	▼0.1
PBC					174	0.1	
PRO					143	0.1	
REP					68	0.1	
MLPD					22	0.0	0.0
Informal votes		1,317			994		
Total valid votes		121,506			121,829		
Turnout		122,823	73.2	▲0.8			
CDU hold	Majority	5,147	4.2	▼0.7			

=== 2009 election ===
Federal election (2009): Rotenburg I – Soltau-Fallingbostel
Notes:	Blue background denotes the winner of the electorate vote. Pink background denotes a candidate elected from their party list. Yellow background denotes an electorate win by a list member, or other incumbent. A ✓ or ✗ denotes status of any incumbent, win or lose respectively.						
Party	Candidate	Votes	%	±%	Party votes	%	±%
CDU	Reinhard Grindel	48,344	40.2	▼1.5	42,324	35.1	▼0.7
SPD	Lars Klingbeil	42,395	35.3	▼9.3	33,279	27.6	▼13.1
FDP	Knuth Uhland	9,895	8.2	▲4.0	16,930	14.0	▲4.5
Greens	Sven-Christian Kindler	9,101	7.6	▲3.5	12,155	10.1	▲3.1
Left	Heinz Kühsel	8,366	7.0	▲3.6	9,759	8.1	▲4.1
NPD	Matthias Behrens	2,138	1.8	▲0.1	1,825	1.5	0.0
Pirates					2,252	1.9	
Tierschutzpartei					1,172	1.0	▲0.3
RRP					597	0.5	
DVU					167	0.1	
ÖDP					133	0.1	
MLPD					22	0.0	0.0
Informal votes		1,702			1,326		
Total valid votes		120,239			120,615		
Turnout		121,941	72.3	▼6.3			
CDU win new seat	Majority	5,949	4.9				
