= Fritz Keller (football administrator) =

German football administrator (born 1957)

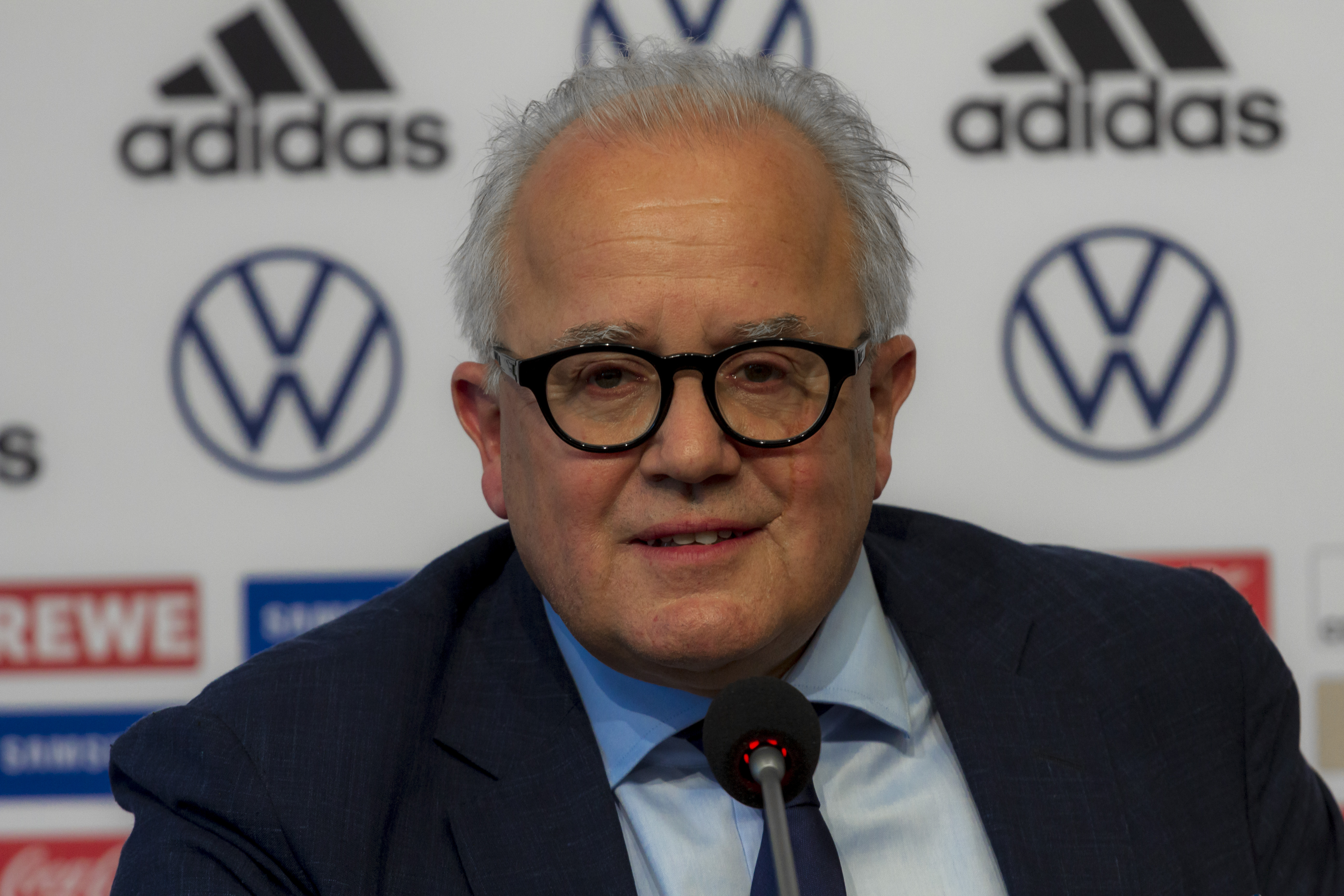
- Keller in 2019

13th President of the DFB
- In office 27 September 2019 – 17 May 2021
- Preceded by: Rainer Koch and Reinhard Rauball (acting)
- Succeeded by: Rainer Koch and Peter Peters (acting)

Personal details
- Born: Friedrich Walter Keller; 2 April 1957 (age 69) Freiburg im Breisgau, West Germany

Friedrich Walter Keller (born 2 April 1957) is a German football administrator and former president SC Freiburg. In 2019, he was elected president German Football Association. He resigned from office in May 2021.

== Background ==
Born in Freiburg, Germany. He has worked is whole life in his restaurant and winery and was elected ″Winemaker of the Year 2019″ by Gault & Millau Wine Guide Together with his family and later joined the German football association where he became chairman in Freiburg SC role known as president from 2010 till 2019.

He was the only candidate for presidential post in August proposed, later poll a vote of 257 out 500 and replaces Reinhard Grindel as the 13th president of the German football body, a seven million members association. Keller was criticised strongly after comparing his vice-president Rainer Koch to the Nazi judge Roland Freisler in April 2021. On 11 May 2021, he announced that he would be stepping down from office.
