= Christos Katzidis =

German politician (born 1969)

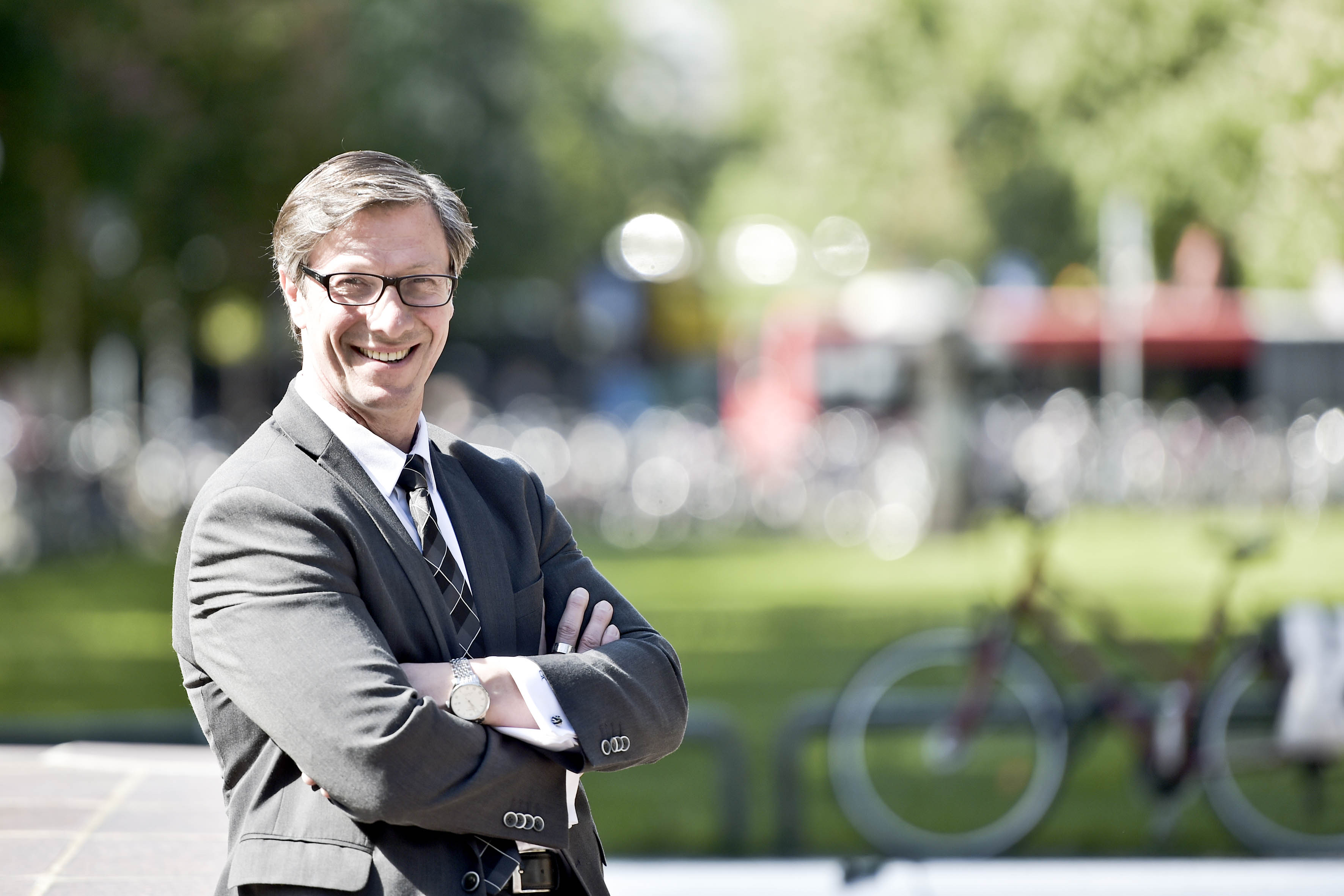
- Katzidis in 2019

Member of the Landtag of North Rhine-Westphalia
- Incumbent
- Assumed office 1 June 2017
- Preceded by: Renate Hendricks
- Constituency: Bonn II

Personal details
- Born: 30 September 1969 (age 56)
- Party: Christian Democratic Union (since 2009)
- Other party: Free Democratic Party (2002–2009)

Christos Georg Katzidis (born 30 September 1969) is a German politician serving as a member of the Landtag of North Rhine-Westphalia since 2017. He has served as president of the Middle Rhine Football Association since 2022.
