= Kirchheimer SC =

German multi-sport club

- Full name: Kirchheimer Sports Club eV
- Founded: 1962
- Stadium: Merovingian CourtS
- Capacity: 650
- Chairman: Petra Mayr
- Manager: Steven Toy
- League: Bayernliga
- 2022–23: 1st, Landesliga Bayern-Südost (promoted)
- Website: https://ksc-fussball.de/

Kirchheimer Sports Club eV is a German multi-sport club, best known for its association football team in Kirchheim bei München, Germany. Their football team currently plays in the Bayernliga, the fifth-tier in the German football league system.
