= Middle Rhine Football Association =

- Fußball-Verband Mittelrhein
- Abbreviation: FVM
- Formation: 21 December 1946
- Type: Football association
- Headquarters: Sövener Straße 60
- Location: Hennef, Germany
- Members: 364,250 (2017)
- President: Christos Katzidis
- Parent organization: German Football Association
- Website: fvm.de

The Middle Rhine Football Association (German: Fußball-Verband Mittelrhein, FVM) is the umbrella organization of the football clubs in the German mid-Rhein area and covers the football districts of Aachen, Berg, Bonn, Düren, Euskirchen, Heinsberg, Cologne, Rhein-Erft-Kreis and Rhein-Sieg-Kreis. The FVM was founded in 1946 and has its headquarters at the Sportschule Hennef. President of the association is Alfred Vianden.

The FVM belongs to the Western German Football Association and is one of 21 state organizations of the German Football Association (German: Deutscher Fussball-Bund - DFB).

In 2017, the FVM had 364,250 members from 1,126 football clubs with 8,016 teams.

The FVM is provider of the Sportschule Hennef.

== Sportschule Hennef ==
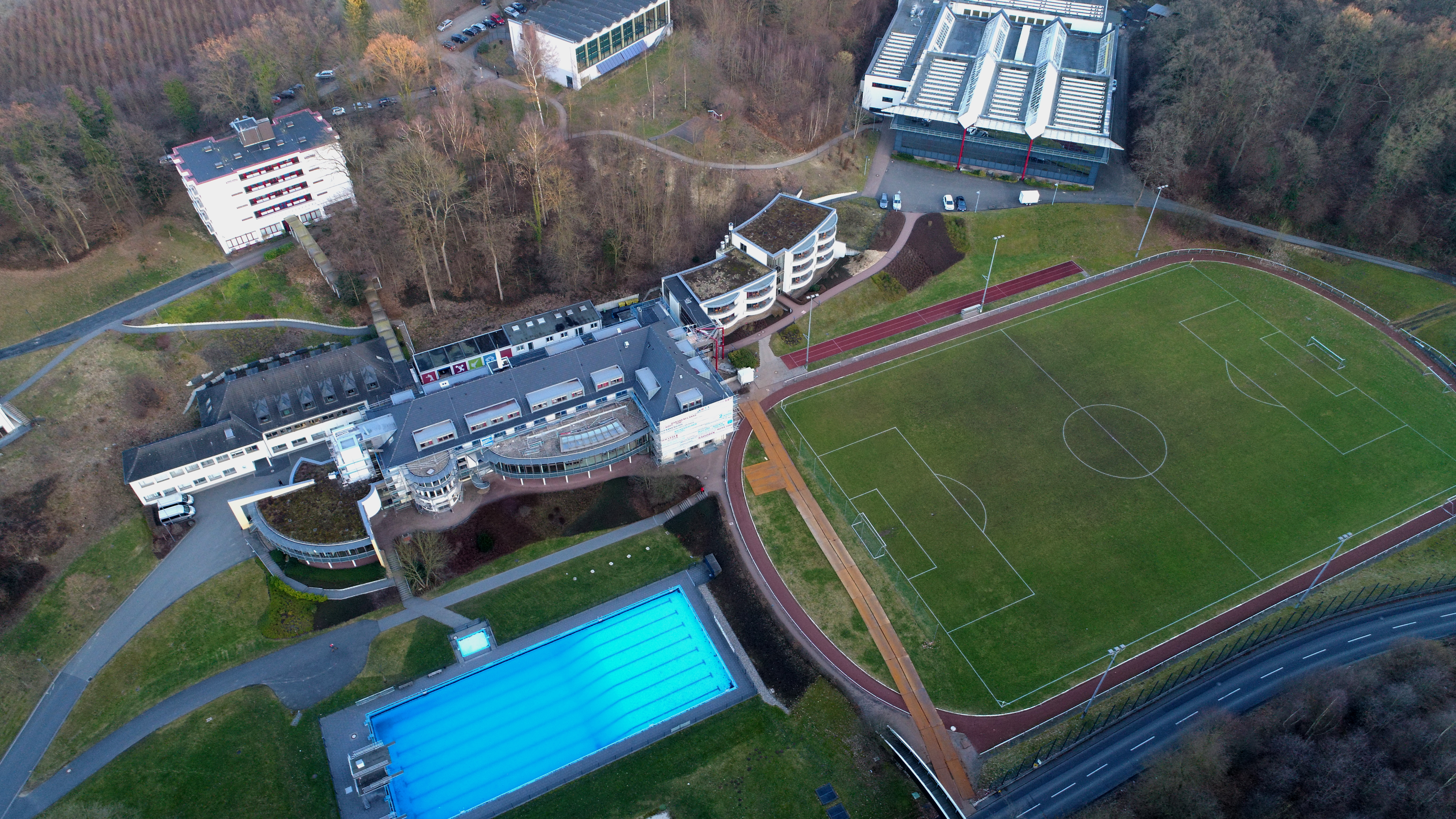
Sports school Hennef

Sportschule Hennef is one of Europe's leading sports schools for football and is also the national training center for boxing and wrestling in Germany. It is the regional training center in North Rhine-Westphalia for weightlifting and judo. Numerous attendances of the Germany national football team, especially before the 1954 FIFA World Cup, and other top international teams from different sports have made the Sportschule Hennef well known nationwide. In 2005 the Argentina national football team attended the Sportschule Hennef during the 2005 FIFA Confederations Cup.

The construction of the Sportschule Hennef was started on 1 October 1949 and completed in the summer of 1950. After an extensive modernization for a total of EUR 6.8 million due to the 2006 World Cup, the school has 3 grass pitches, an artificial pitch, a synthetic turf hall, two multi-purpose halls, each a special hall for judo, boxing, wrestling and weightlifting, a weight room, an outdoor swimming pool (50m lanes) with a ten-meter tower and an indoor swimming pool (25m lanes), nine meeting rooms and a modern computer room as well as a spacious auditorium. In addition, it has 200 beds in four different categories.
