= Reinhard Grindel =

German journalist and politician

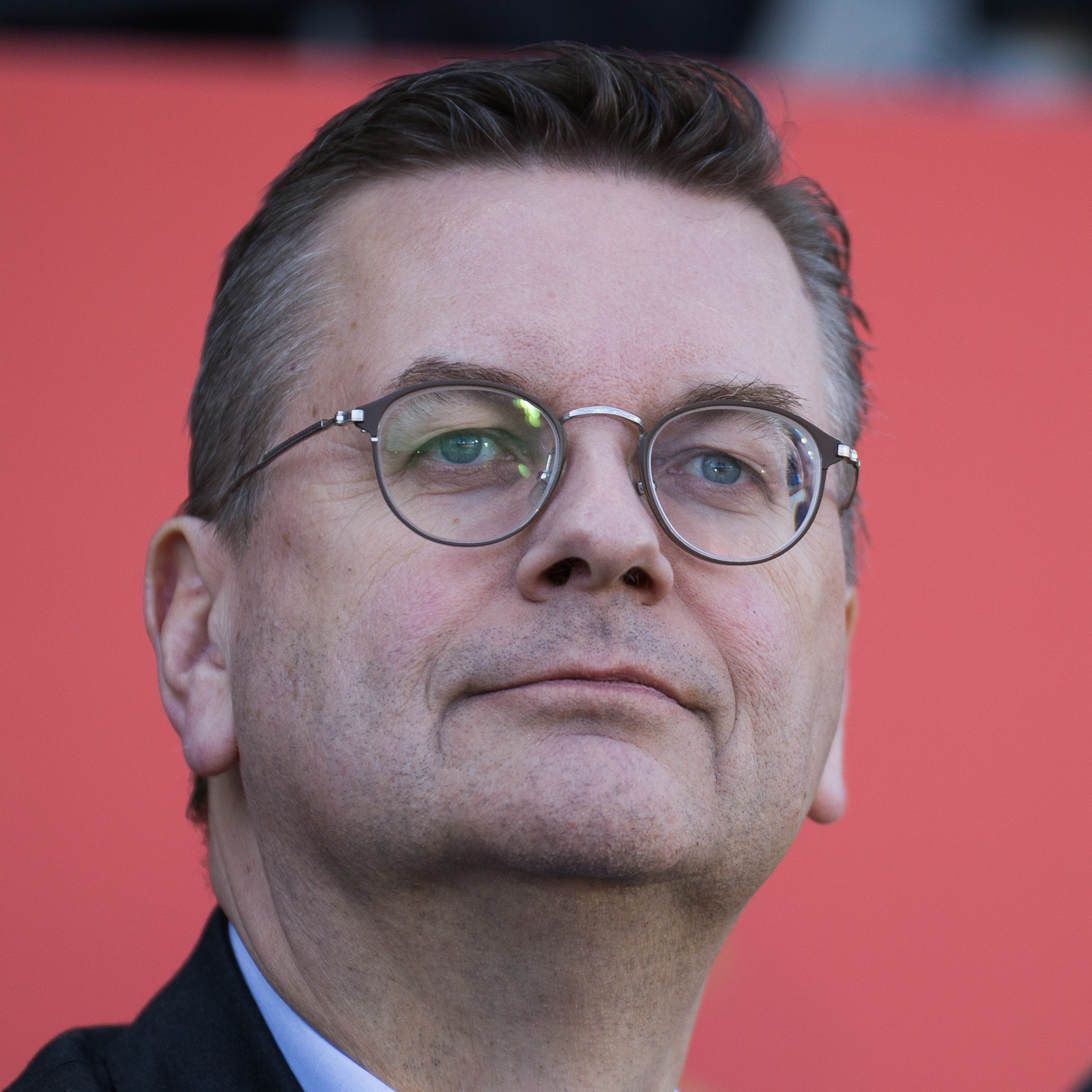
- Grindel in 2018

President of the German Football Association
- In office 15 April 2016 – 2 April 2019
- Preceded by: Wolfgang Niersbach
- Succeeded by: Fritz Keller

Member of the Bundestag; from Lower Saxony
- In office 17 October 2002 – 3 June 2016
- Preceded by: Multi-member district
- Succeeded by: Kathrin Rösel
- Constituency: State list (2002–2009); Rotenburg I – Soltau-Fallingbostel (2009–2013); Rotenburg I – Heidekreis (2013–2016)

Personal details
- Born: Reinhard Dieter Grindel; 19 September 1961 (age 65) Hamburg, West Germany
- Party: Christian Democratic Union
- Children: 2
- Education: University of Hamburg
- Occupation: Journalist

Reinhard Dieter Grindel (born 19 September 1961) is a German journalist, politician (CDU) and football administrator.

From 2002 to 2016, Grindel was member of the Bundestag (Lower Chamber of the German Parliament). On 15 April 2016, he was elected president of the German Football Association (DFB) and resigned as member of parliament. On 2 April 2019, he resigned as president of the association.

== Early life and education ==
Grindel was born in Hamburg where he also went to school and studied law after obtaining a grant from the Konrad Adenauer Foundation.

After his studies he worked as a journalist for radio and television. From 1997 to 1999 he headed the ZDF studio in Bonn, from 1999 to 2002 that in Brussels.

== Political career ==
Grindel became a member of the CDU in 1977. He was then active in the Young Union and belonged to the state board in Hamburg from 1979 to 1985. From 1981 to 1987, he was also a member of the CDU district Board Hamburg-Eimsbüttel. From 1982 to 1988, he was deputy of the local district assembly.

Grindel was a member of the German Bundestag from 2002 to 2016. He was elected to the Bundestag through the CDU state list of Lower Saxony in 2002 and 2005. In the 2009 federal election, he was directly elected as the representative of the constituency Rotenburg I – Soltau-Fallingbostel. In the 17th legislature, he was a member of the Committee on Internal Affairs.

In the 2013 federal election, Grindel again won his constituency. In the 18th legislative term he was deputy chairman of the Sports Committee. In the negotiations to form a Grand Coalition of the Christian Democrats and the Social Democrats (SPD) following the elections, he was part of the CDU/CSU delegation in the working group on integration and migration, led by Maria Böhmer and Aydan Özoğuz.

In June 2016, after being elected as President of the German Football association, Grindel resigned as member of the German Bundestag and was succeeded by Kathrin Rösel.

Since 2003, Grindel has been serving as deputy chairman of the CDU district association Elbe-Weser.

== Football administration ==
Grindel is a member of Rotenburger SV. From 2011 to 2014, he was 1st Vice President of the Lower Saxony Football Association, he is also vice chairman of the Board of Trustees of the Robert Enke Foundation. From October 2013 to April 2016, he was treasurer of the German Football Association. Grindel was elected on 15 April 2016 to the position of DFB president, succeeding the retiring Wolfgang Niersbach.

In July 2018, Mesut Özil criticised Grindel's approach to Özil's Turkish ancestry in a statement declaring his retirement from the national team, following controversial photos with Recep Tayyip Erdogan. Grindel's handling of the fallout was also criticised by Matt Pearson of Deutsche Welle, who opined that comments Grindel made in 2004 calling multiculturalism "a myth and a lifelong lie" were incompatible with his role at the DFB, stating "it doesn't seem appropriate for him to continue in a position where he's overseeing players and coaches from a variety of backgrounds".

Grindel resigned as president of the German Football Association on 2 April 2019. The reason he gave for his resignation was his criticism of himself after accepting a luxury watch from Hryhoriy Surkis, a Ukrainian oligarch and sports administrator. Grindel had already been the target of criticism in the run-up to the meeting. One accusation was, among other things, the lack of mention of additional income when he took up his post as chairman of the supervisory board of the association's so-called "media management company". He was also criticized for his communication in public and for his media relations. As a result of his approach Grindel has been the target of criticism since the summer of 2018.

== Personal life ==
Grindel is married and has two sons.
