= Wolfgang Niersbach =

German sports official

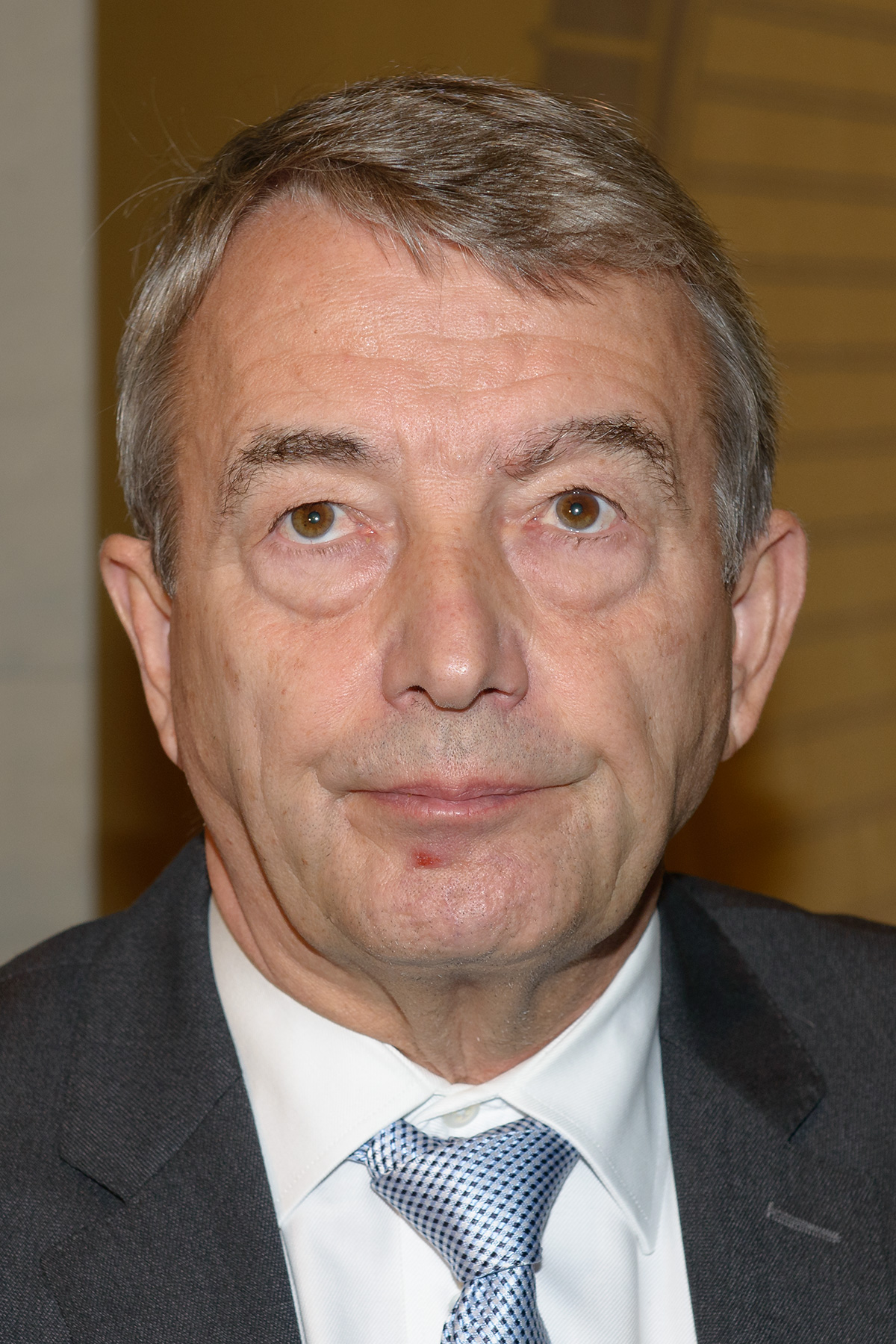
- Niersbach in 2015

11th President of the DFB
- In office 2 March 2012 – 9 November 2015
- Preceded by: Theo Zwanziger
- Succeeded by: Rainer Koch and Reinhard Rauball (acting)

Personal details
- Born: 30 November 1950 (age 75) Rommerskirchen, West Germany
- Children: 2
- Occupation: Journalist

Wolfgang Niersbach (born 30 November 1950) is a German sports official and former sports journalist. From 2 March 2012 until 9 November 2015, he was President of the German Football Association (German: Deutscher Fußball-Bund, DFB).

== Biography ==
Niersbach played football in youth team of Düsseldorfer SC 99 and went to high school at the Görres-Gymnasium in Düsseldorf. After high school, he studied German studies and started volunteering in 1973 for the news agency Sport-Informations-Dienst. Until 1988, he wrote reports for this news agency and acted as an editor for association football and ice hockey, covering numerous World and European Championships and Olympic Games. At the same time, he was responsible editor for the stadium newspaper for Fortuna Düsseldorf for eleven years, where he designed the Fortuna aktuell, as well as working four years with the stadium newspaper for the Düsseldorfer EG ice hockey club.

As press officer of the 1988 European Football Championship in West Germany, Niersbach gained experience in organizing press activities during major sporting events. Eventually leading to him becoming press secretary and media director at the DFB. In March 1997, he became a member of the bid committee for the 2006 FIFA World Cup. After the successful completion of his application, on 1 January 2001 he was made Executive Vice President and Press Officer of the 2006 FIFA World Cup Organizing Committee. His successor as director of communications at the DFB was Harald Stenger. On 15 September 2006, he was appointed as successor to Bernd Pfaff as the director at the DFB responsible for the areas of team management, youth, talent and coaching. He worked closely in this position with Germany national football team manager Oliver Bierhoff and DFB sporting director Matthias Sammer. At the DFB Bundestag in Mainz on 26 October 2007, Niersbach was appointed as successor to Horst R. Schmidt as new Secretary General. Making him the highest paid staff of the DFB.

== President of the German Football Association ==
After a DFB board meeting on 7 December 2011 in Frankfurt, it was announced that Niersbach was ready for election as the new DFB president. The previous president, Theo Zwanziger, ended his tenure in March 2012, and on 2 March 2012, Niersbach was unanimously elected as the new DFB president. His successor as secretary general was Helmut Sandrock. In January 2013 he signed the Declaration of the 53 European FIFA member associations to reform the Fifa Statutes. The declaration rejected the idea of a time limit of membership in the FIFA Executive Committee and an integrity check of its members by FIFA. Instead, the integrity check would be made by the regional associations. On 24 May 2013, he was elected into the UEFA Executive Committee and on 24 March 2015, into the FIFA Council.

On 9 November 2015, he resigned as DFB president amidst reports about alleged bribery surrounding the 2006 FIFA World Cup. In March 2016, the FIFA Ethics Committee opened formal proceedings against Niersbach regarding the awarding of the 2006 World Cup.

On 25 July 2016, FIFA's ethics committee has announced a one-year ban from all football-related activities for Wolfgang Niersbach for failing to report potential misconduct surrounding the award of the 2006 World Cup to Germany.

== Family ==
Niersbach is divorced and has two grown-up daughters. Around the end of 2014 he announced that he is in a relationship with a woman from Munich, who was 23 years younger than him.
