= DFB-Bundestag =

Highest body of the German Football Association

The DFB-Bundestag (National Conference) is the highest body of the German Football Association (German: Deutscher Fussball-Bund, DFB).

== Structure ==
The DFB-Bundestag convenes regularly every three years. The term of office for DFB presidential board and executive board is also three years. The national conference is composed of a total of 259 voting delegates, including members of the presidential board and executive board, the delegates of the state and regional associations of the DFB and the Deutsche Fußball Liga members. Additionally the honorary members and the members of the judiciary bodies, the statutory auditors and the committees, also participate as advisory capacity.

The national conference can make decisions if at least half of the voters are present. For the elections of the steering committee and the executive board, a simple casting of majority vote is sufficient for the decision. For amendments to the statutes a two-thirds majority is required.

== Important decisions ==
- 1900 foundation of the German Football Association
- 1904 candidate for FIFA
- 1906 acquisition of UK rules at the request of FIFA
- 1924 joining to the German Sports Association
- 1949 re-establishing the DFB
- 1962 introduction of the Bundesliga
- 1990 merging of the DFB and DFV

== Venues ==
The 41st national conference was held in October 2013 in Nuremberg. The 42nd national conference will be held in November 2016 in Erfurt.
