= Kirchheim bei München =

Kirchheim b.München
- Municipality
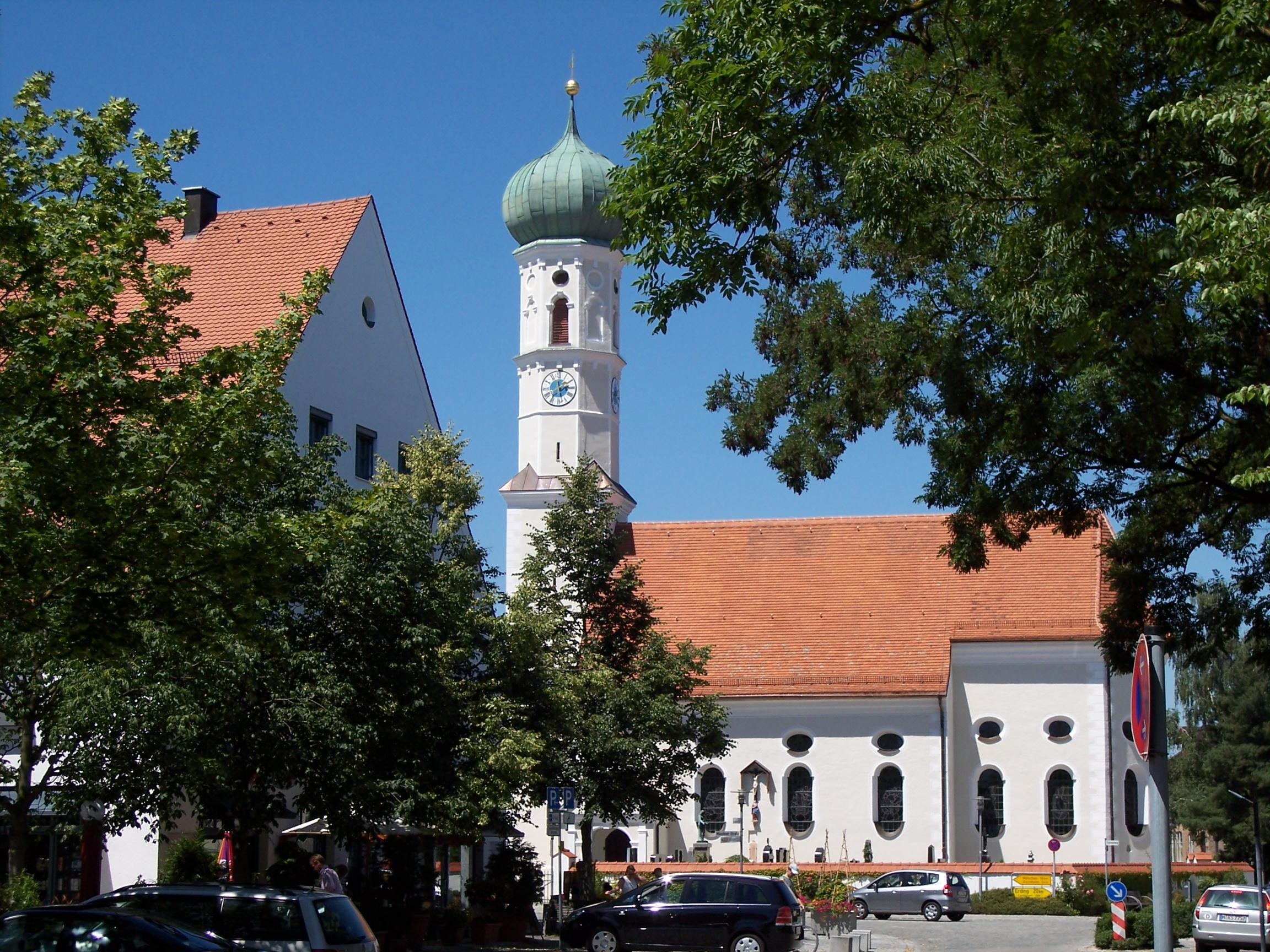
- Saint Andreas Church

- Coat of arms

- Location of Kirchheim b.München within Munich district
- Interactive map of Kirchheim b.München
- Location within Germany Location within Bavaria
- Coordinates: 48°11′N 11°45′E
- Country: Germany
- State: Bavaria
- Admin. region: Oberbayern
- District: Munich

Government
  - Mayor (2024–30): Stephan Keck (SPD)

Area
  - Total: 15.5 km^{2} (6.0 sq mi)
- Elevation: 511 m (1,677 ft)

Population (2025-12-31)
  - Total: 13,708
  - Density: 884/km^{2} (2,290/sq mi)
- Time zone: UTC+01:00 (CET)
  - Summer (DST): UTC+02:00 (CEST)
- Postal codes: 85551
- Dialling codes: 089
- Vehicle registration: M
- Website: www.kirchheim-heimstetten.de

Kirchheim bei München (German pronunciation: [ˈkɪʁçhaɪm baɪ ˈmʏnçn̩], lit. 'Kirchheim near Munich') is a municipality in the district of Munich, in Bavaria, Germany. It is located 14 km east of Munich (centre). As of 2023 it has a population of 14,030.

== See also ==
- Heimstettener See
