= 2017–18 Verbandspokal (women) =

Tournament details
- Country: Germany
- Teams: 42

Tournament statistics
- Matches played: 21
- Goals scored: 74 (3.52 per match)
- Goals scored in penalty shoot-outs not included.

The 2017–18 Verbandspokal, (English: 2017–18 Association Cup) consisted of twenty-one regional cup competitions, the Verbandspokale, the qualifying competition for the 2018–19 DFB-Pokal, the German Cup.

All clubs from the Regionalliga and below could enter the regional Verbandspokale, subject to the rules and regulations of each region. Clubs from the Bundesliga and 2. Bundesliga could not enter but were instead directly qualified for the first round of the DFB-Pokal. Reserve teams were not permitted to take part in the DFB-Pokal or the Verbandspokale. The precise rules of each regional Verbandspokal are laid down by the regional football association organising it.

All twenty-one winners qualified for the first round of the German Cup in the following season.

== Competitions ==
The finals of the 2017–18 Verbandspokal competitions (winners listed in bold):

Cup	Date	Location	Team 1	Result	Team 2	Attendance	Report
Baden Cup (2017–18 season)	16 June 2018	Karlsruhe	**Karlsruher SC**	3–0	Amicitia Viernheim		Report
Bavarian Cup (2017–18 season)	31 May 2018	Frensdorf	SV Frensdorf	0–0 (a.e.t.) (4–6 p)	**FC Forstern**	450	Report
Berlin Cup (2017–18 season)	20 May 2018	Berlin	Blau-Weiß Berlin	1–4	**Viktoria Berlin**		Report
Brandenburg Cup (2017–18 season)	21 May 2018	Hohen Neuendorf	Forst Borgsdorf	2–5	**FSV Babelsberg**	273	Report
Bremen Cup (2017–18 season)	21 May 2018	Bremen	ATS Buntentor	1–2	**TuS Schwachhausen**		Report
Hamburg Cup (2017–18 season)	10 May 2018	Hamburg	**Bramfelder SV**	2–1	FC St. Pauli		Report
Hessian Cup (2017–18 season)	10 June 2018	Bad Camberg	**Jahn Calden**	2–1	Eintracht Frankfurt		Report
Lower Rhine Cup (2017–18 season)	10 May 2018	Moers	GSV Moers	0–0 (a.e.t.) (2–4 p)	**Borussia Bocholt**		Report
Lower Saxony Cup (2017–18 season)	3 June 2018	Barsinghausen	**Hannover 96**	2–0	VfL Jesteburg		Report
Mecklenburg-Vorpommern Cup (2017–18 season)	10 June 2018	Schwerin	FSV Schwerin	2–4	**1. FC Neubrandenburg**	150	Report
Middle Rhine Cup (2017–18 season)	31 May 2018	Düren	**Vorwärts Spoho Köln**	1–1 (a.e.t.) (4–3 p)	Alemannia Aachen	346	Report
Rhineland Cup (2017–18 season)	13 May 2018	Schweich	**SV Holzbach**	1–1 (a.e.t.) (5–4 p)	1. FFC Montabaur	100	Report
Saarland Cup (2017–18 season)	10 May 2018	Eppelborn	DJK Saarwellingen	0–1	**1. FC Riegelsberg**		Report
Saxony Cup (2017–18 season)	21 May 2018	Leipzig	Phoenix Leipzig	1–2	**Fortuna Dresden**	650	Report
Saxony-Anhalt Cup (2017–18 season)	10 June 2018	Bernburg	**Magdeburger FFC**	6–0	Blau-Weiß Dölau	205	Report
Schleswig-Holstein Cup (2017–18 season)	21 May 2018	Flensburg	TuRa Meldorf	1–3	**Holstein Kiel**	298	Report
South Baden Cup (2017–18 season)	20 May 2018	Löffingen	FC Freiburg-St. Georgen	2–4	**Hegauer FV**		Report
Southwestern Cup (2017–18 season)	27 May 2018	Kaiserslautern	**TuS Wörrstadt**	6–2	FC Marnheim	150	Report
Thuringian Cup (2017–18 season)	1 May 2018	Erfurt	**1. FFV Erfurt**	3–1	Carl Zeiss Jena		Report
Westphalian Cup (2017–18 season)	31 May 2018	Billerbeck	**DJK-VfL Billerbeck**	2–0	Germania Hauenhorst		Report
Württemberg Cup (2017–18 season)	31 May 2018	Schemmerhofen	**SV Alberweiler**	4–0	FV Löchgau		Report
