= 2018–19 Verbandspokal (women) =

Tournament details
- Country: Germany
- Teams: 42

The 2018–19 Verbandspokal, (English: 2018–19 Association Cup) consisted of twenty regional cup competitions, the Verbandspokale, the qualifying competition for the 2019–20 DFB-Pokal, the German Cup.

All clubs from the Regionalliga and below could enter the regional Verbandspokale, subject to the rules and regulations of each region. Clubs from the Bundesliga and 2. Bundesliga could not enter but were instead directly qualified for the first round of the DFB-Pokal. Reserve teams are not permitted to take part in the DFB-Pokal. The precise rules of each regional Verbandspokal are laid down by the regional football association organising it.

The winners qualified for the first round of the German Cup in the following season.

== Competitions ==
The finals of the 2018–19 Verbandspokal competitions (winners listed in bold):

| Cup | Date | Location | Team 1 | Result | Team 2 | Attendance | Report |
|---|---|---|---|---|---|---|---|
| Baden Cup (2018–19 season) | 30 May 2019 | Bad Schönborn | **Karlsruher SC** | 4–0 | 1. FC Mühlhausen | | Report |
| Bavarian Cup (2018–19 season) | 30 May 2019 | Forstern | **FC Forstern** | 2–1 | 1. FC Nürnberg | 150 | Report |
| Berlin Cup (2018–19 season) | 1 May 2019 | Berlin | Viktoria Berlin | 2–3 | **Union Berlin** | | Report |
| Brandenburg Cup (2018–19 season) | 26 May 2019 | Potsdam | **FSV Babelsberg** | 6–2 | Forst Borgsdorf | 250 | Report |
| Bremen Cup (2018–19 season) | 25 May 2019 | Bremen | ATS Buntentor | 0–1 | **TuS Schwachhausen** | | Report |
| Hamburg Cup (2018–19 season) | 30 May 2019 | Hamburg | Union Tornesch | 2–4 | **Hamburger SV** | | Report |
| Hessian Cup (2018–19 season) | 16 June 2019 | Erlensee | **Eintracht Frankfurt** | 3–2 | Jahn Calden | | Report |
| Lower Rhine Cup (2018–19 season) | 30 May 2019 | Mönchengladbach | **1. FC Mönchengladbach** | 5–1 | SV Heißen | 300 | Report |
| Lower Saxony Cup (2018–19 season) | 1 June 2019 | Barsinghausen | Osnabrücker SC | 1–6 | **Eintracht Braunschweig** | | Report |
| Mecklenburg-Vorpommern Cup (2018–19 season) | 19 May 2019 | Waren (Müritz) | 1. FC Neubrandenburg | 1–1 (a.e.t.) (3–4 p) | **HSG Warnemünde** | 219 | Report |
| Middle Rhine Cup (2018–19 season) | 20 June 2019 | Düren | Grün-Weiß Brauweiler | 0–2 | **Fortuna Köln** | 457 | Report |
| Rhineland Cup (2018–19 season) | 19 May 2019 | Baar | **SG Andernach** | 3–1 | SV Holzbach | 250 | Report |
| Saarland Cup (2018–19 season) | 19 May 2019 | St. Ingbert | Parr Medelsheim | 0–8 | **SV Göttelborn** | | Report |
| Saxony Cup (2018–19 season) | 1 May 2019 | Flöha | **RB Leipzig** | 3–2 (a.e.t.) | Phoenix Leipzig | 1,125 | Report |
| Saxony-Anhalt Cup (2018–19 season) | 1 May 2019 | Bernburg | Rot-Schwarz Edlau | 1–4 | **Magdeburger FFC** | 350 | Report |
| Schleswig-Holstein Cup (2018–19 season) | 25 May 2019 | Lübeck | SV Henstedt-Ulzburg | 2–3 | **Holstein Kiel** | | Report |
| South Baden Cup (2018–19 season) | 10 June 2019 | Donaueschingen | ESV Freiburg | 0–8 | **Hegauer FV** | | Report |
| Southwestern Cup (2018–19 season) | 2 June 2019 | Heltersberg | Schott Mainz | 3–3 (a.e.t.) (2–4 p) | **TuS Wörrstadt** | 100 | Report |
| Thuringian Cup (2018–19 season) | 1 May 2019 | Merxleben | 1. FFV Erfurt | 0–1 | **USV Jena II** | 350 | Report |
| Westphalian Cup (2018–19 season) | 30 May 2019 | Dortmund | **SpVg Berghofen** | 4–0 | Sportfreunde Siegen | 550 | Report |
| Württemberg Cup (2018–19 season) | 30 May 2019 | Schemmerhofen | SV Alberweiler | 1–1 (a.e.t.) (2–4 p) | **SV Hegnach** | | Report |
