= Regionalliga Südwest =

- Founded: 2012
- Country: Germany
- States: Baden-Württemberg; Bavaria (1 club); Hesse; Rhineland-Palatinate; Saarland
- Number of clubs: 18
- Level on pyramid: Level 4
- Promotion to: 3. Liga
- Relegation to: Hessenliga; Oberliga Baden-Württemberg; Oberliga Rheinland-Pfalz/Saar
- Current champions: Sonnenhof Großaspach (2025–26)
- Website: Official website
- Current: 2026–27 Regionalliga Südwest

The Regionalliga Südwest ('Regional League Southwest') is the fourth tier of the German football league system in the states of Hesse, Baden-Württemberg, Rhineland-Palatinate and Saarland. It is one of five leagues at this level, together with the Regionalliga Bayern, Regionalliga Nordost, Regionalliga Nord and the Regionalliga West.

The league was formed in 2012, when the clubs from the Regionalliga Süd, except those from Bavaria, were joined by the clubs of the Regionalliga West from Saarland and Rhineland-Palatinate.

== History ==
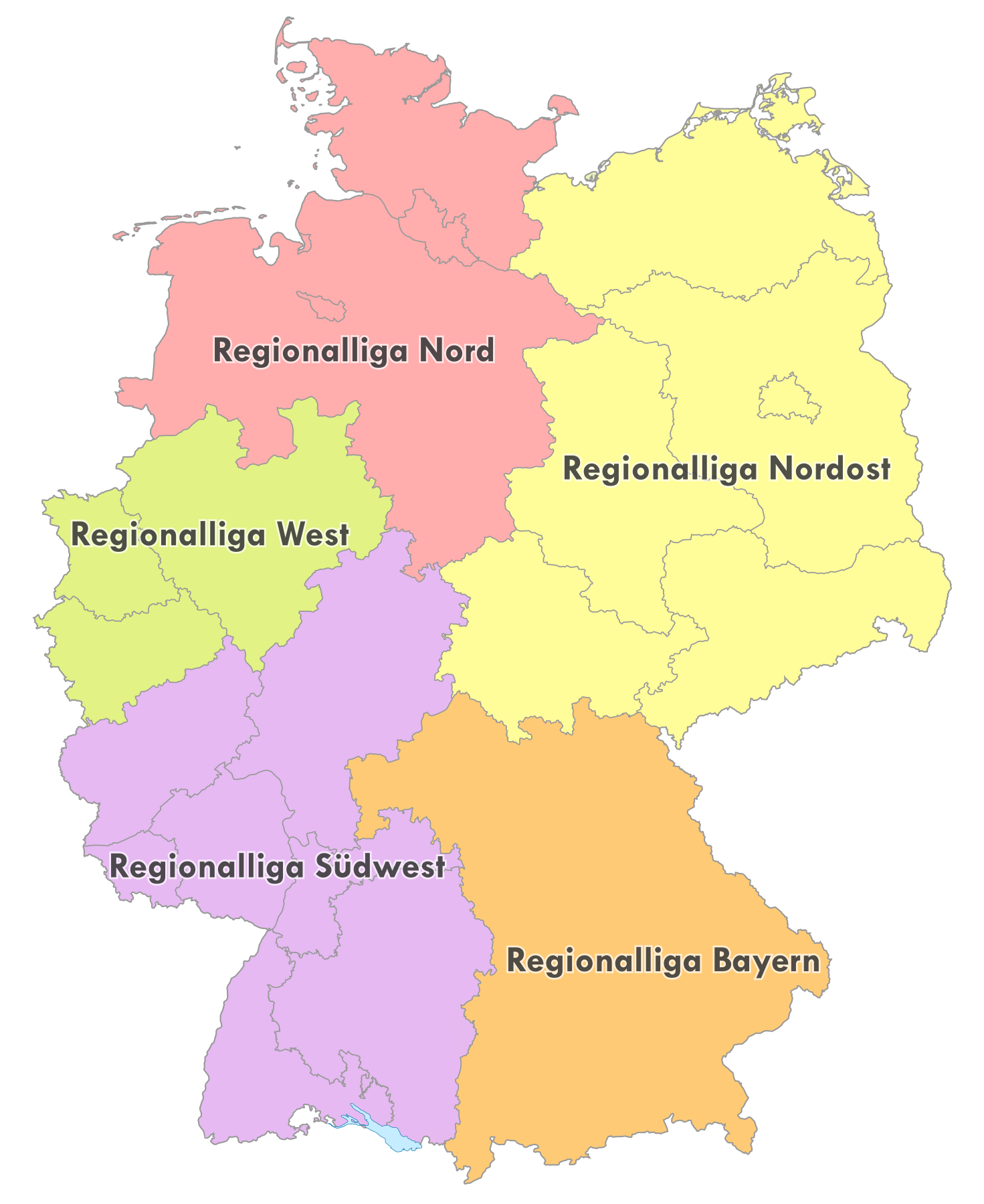
The five regional leagues since 2012/13 (Regionalliga Südwest in purple)

The German league system had been reformed in 2008, when the 3. Liga was established and the number of regional leagues increased from two to three. A further alteration was made ahead of the 2012−13 season. This was prompted by the large number of insolvencies in the fourth tier, caused by high costs and infrastructure requirements, while the clubs at this level complained about low incomes and lack of interest from TV broadcasters. Regionalliga stadia were required to have at least 1,000 seats and a separate stand with separate entrance for away spectators, and such requirements were seen as causing excessive financial strain on amateur clubs. Many clubs also struggled to cope with the 400-page long licence application, as they had to rely on volunteers rather than being able to draw on permanent staff. This led to Oberliga champions sometimes declining their right to promotion to avoid the financial risks of the Regionalliga.

In October 2010, at a special conference of the German Football Association, the DFB, 223 of the 253 delegates voted for a reform of the league system at the fourth level. The number of Regionalligas was to be expanded to five, with the re-establishment of the Regionalliga Nordost, the formation of the Regionalliga Bayern and a shift of the Regionalliga Süd to the new Regionalliga Süd/Südwest, later renamed Regionalliga Südwest.

The suggestion for the league reform had come from Bavaria, where, in a meeting of top-level amateur clubs at Wendelstein, the financial survival of the leagues and clubs in the current system had been questioned. This meeting resulted in the publication of the Wendelsteiner Anstoß, which demanded a clear demarcation between professional football in the first three tiers of German football and amateur football below that. For this purpose, the paper demanded a re-establishment of the German amateur football championship as an incentive and goal for top amateur clubs that did not want to turn professional.

With the reform in 2012, the Regionalliga was increased from three to five leagues. The Regionalliga Südwest is hosted by the Southwestern Regional Football Association and the Southern German Football Association (with the exception of the Bavarian Football Association). It extends over the federal states of Rhineland-Palatinate, Saarland, Hesse and Baden-Württemberg.

Rules for promotion to the 3. Liga have changed over time (see Promotion to the 3. Liga). Typically, four teams each year are relegated to and promoted from the three Oberliga leagues below the Regionalliga Südwest: the Oberliga Rheinland-Pfalz/Saar, Hessenliga and Oberliga Baden-Württemberg.

In 2017, the league signed an agreement to host the China national under-20 football team, allowing the team to compete in the league in friendly matches to fill in as the league's 20th club. The arrangement was only approved by 16 of the 19 clubs in the league, with those in opposition criticising it as part of the increasing commercialisation of football. During the team's match against TSV Schott Mainz, the display of a Tibetan flag led to the team walking off in protest. Consequently, the Chinese players were recalled and the agreement was abrogated.

== Rules & regulations ==
=== Owners and shareholders ===
The Regionalliga Südwest is owned by the Regionalliga Südwest GbR. The shareholders are nine football associations. The logo of the Regionalliga Südwest, which was introduced in 2012, shows a football player who is oriented towards the south-west. The seven blue stars symbolize the regional associations involved, the two white stars stand for the regional associations SFV and FRVS.

The seven DFB-German football associations:

- Baden Football Association
- Hessian Football Association
- Rhineland Football Association
- Saarland Football Association
- South Baden Football Association
- Southwest German Football Association
- Württemberg Football Association

The two DFB-Regionalverbände associations:

- Southern German Football Association
- Southwestern Regional Football Association

=== Inaugural qualification ===
The new league was nominally going to have 18 clubs; however, in its first, transitional season the DFB permitted up to 22 clubs in the league. Restrictions existed on reserve sides, with no more than seven reserve teams were permitted per Regionalliga. Reserve teams of 3rd Liga clubs are not permitted to play in the Regionalliga. The make-up of the clubs entering the new Regionalligas from the leagues below was left to the regional football association and not regulated by the DFB.

An exception was the Bavarian club FC Bayern Alzenau, who had traditionally played in Hesse's league system. This club participated in the new Regionalliga Südwest, at their own request, rather than in the Regionalliga Bayern.

19 clubs qualified to play in the league's first season (2012–13):

- From the Regionalliga Süd: FC Bayern Alzenau, SC Freiburg II, Eintracht Frankfurt II, FSV Frankfurt II, Sonnenhof Großaspach, TSG 1899 Hoffenheim II, KSV Hessen Kassel, Waldhof Mannheim, SC Pfullendorf, Wormatia Worms
- From the Regionalliga West: Eintracht Trier, SV Elversberg, SC Idar-Oberstein, 1. FC Kaiserslautern II, TuS Koblenz, 1. FSV Mainz 05 II
- Promoted from the Oberligas: 1. FC Eschborn, FC 08 Homburg, SSV Ulm 1846

=== Promotion to the 3. Liga ===
Between 2012−13 and 2017−18, the Regionalliga Südwest winners and runners-up, and the champions of the four other Regionalligen played-off for three promotion spots.

As four teams were relegated from the 3. Liga at the end of the 2018–19 season, the Regionalliga Südwest champions Waldhof Mannheim, along with their counterparts from the Nordost and West, were promoted directly. In 2020, the three direct promotion spots went to the Südwest champions and the champions of the two leagues that participated in the promotion play-off in the previous season, while the champions of the Nordost and the West participate in the play-off. This format was initially installed as a temporary solution until the DFB-Bundestag in September 2019 decided on a format that could have enabled all Regionalliga champions to be promoted. On that date, the Bundestag delegates voted to grant the Südwest and West champions two direct promotions indefinitely starting in 2021, with a third direct promotion place assigned by rotation between the Regionalliga Nord, Nordost and Bayern champions. The champions of the two Regionalligen with no direct promotion place participate in two-legged playoffs to determine the fourth promoted team.

== Champions & runners-up ==
Season	Champions	Runners-up
2012–13	Hessen Kassel	**SV Elversberg**
2013–14	**Sonnenhof Großaspach**	SC Freiburg II^{1}
2014–15	Kickers Offenbach	1. FC Saarbrücken
2015–16	Waldhof Mannheim	SV Elversberg
2016–17	SV Elversberg	Waldhof Mannheim
2017–18	1. FC Saarbrücken	Waldhof Mannheim
2018–19	**Waldhof Mannheim**	1. FC Saarbrücken
2019–20	**1. FC Saarbrücken**	TSV Steinbach
2020–21	**SC Freiburg II**	SV Elversberg
2021–22	**SV Elversberg**	SSV Ulm 1846
2022–23	**SSV Ulm 1846**	TSV Steinbach
2023–24	**VfB Stuttgart II**	Stuttgarter Kickers
2024–25	**TSG Hoffenheim II**	Kickers Offenbach
2025-26	**Sonnenhof Großaspach**	SGV Freiberg

- Promoted teams in **bold**.
- ^{1} SC Freiburg II did not apply for a 3. Liga licence and was replaced by third placed 1. FSV Mainz 05 II in the promotion round, which Mainz completed successfully.

== Records ==
=== Most points in a season ===
- SV Waldhof Mannheim – 88 (2018−19)

=== Most appearances ===
- Johannes Reichert – 333 (1. FC Kaiserslautern II, SSV Ulm 1846)

=== Most goals ===
- Florian Treske – 80 (Kickers Offenbach, Wormatia Worms, SSV Ulm 1846)

== League statistics ==
The top goal scorers and spectator statistics for the league are:

Season	Overall Spectators	Per game	Best supported Club	Spectators /game	Top goal scorer	Goals
2012–13	319,159	933	Hessen Kassel	3,489	Jérôme Assauer (TuS)	20
2013–14	388,257	1,269	Kickers Offenbach	6,147	Petar Slišković (FSV)	23
2014–15	476,243	1,556	Kickers Offenbach	6,364	Daniele Gabriele (SCF)	21
2015–16	521,523	1,704	Waldhof Mannheim	6,539	Mijo Tunjić (ELV)	21
2016–17	599,772	1,754	Kickers Offenbach	5,229	Muhamed Alawie (TRI); Patrick Schmidt (SAA)	22
2017–18	584,788	1,710	Kickers Offenbach	6,199	Karl-Heinz Lappe (MA2)	22
2018–19	500,972	1,637	Waldhof Mannheim	6,509	Jean Koffi (ELV)	19
2019–20	293,978	1,448	Kickers Offenbach	5,622	André Becker (WAL)	20
2020–21	62,089	234	Hessen Kassel	399	Sascha Marquet (STE)	26
2021–22	354,102	1,035	Kickers Offenbach	5,317	Nick Proschwitz (HO2)	20
2022–23	442,103	1,445	Kickers Offenbach	5,922	Cas Peters (FRA)	20
2023–24	497,077	1,624	Kickers Offenbach	6,128	Phil Harres (HOM)	24

League record

== Placings in the Regionalliga Südwest ==
Final league positions of all clubs who have played in the league:

Club	13	14	15	16	17	18	19	20	21	22	23	24	25
SV Elversberg	2	**3L**	3	2	**1**	5	4	3	2	**1**	**3L**	**2B**	**2B**
SSV Ulm 1846 ^{2}	10	15			9	9	6	7	4	2	**1**	**3L**	**2B**
Waldhof Mannheim	6	5	13	**1**	2	2	**1**	**3L**	**3L**	**3L**	**3L**	**3L**	**3L**
1. FC Saarbrücken	**3L**	**3L**	2	7	3	**1**	2	**1**	**3L**	**3L**	**3L**	**3L**	**3L**
VfB Stuttgart II	**3L**	**3L**	**3L**	**3L**	7	10	15		8	11	8	**1**	**3L**
1899 Hoffenheim II	9	10	9	3	4	6	10	9	16	13	3	3	**1**
Kickers Offenbach	**3L**	8	**1**	4	12	3	5	8	3	3	7	11	2
SGV Freiberg											14	4	3
TSV Steinbach Haiger				12	5	8	8	2	5	4	2	12	4
FSV Frankfurt	**2B**	**2B**	**2B**	**2B**	**3L**	14	12	12	6	15	5	9	5
Stuttgarter Kickers	**3L**	**3L**	**3L**	**3L**	13	17						2	6
SC Freiburg II	7	2	7	15		4	7	13	**1**	**3L**	**3L**	**3L**	7
FC 08 Homburg	14	11	6	6	15		3	4	7	6	4	5	8
KSV Hessen Kassel	**1**	13	10	8	10	16			12	7	13	10	9
SG Barockstadt Fulda-Lehnerz											11	7	10
Astoria Walldorf			8	11	11	11	13	5	18	10	12	14	11
Mainz 05 II	11	3	**3L**	**3L**	**3L**	7	14	6	17	5	9	8	12
Eintracht Trier	5	6	11	5	18						18		13
Bahlinger SC				14				11	9	9	10	13	14
FC Gießen								15	11	19			15
Eintracht Frankfurt II ^{1}	15	12										6	16
1. Göppinger SV													17
FC 08 Villingen													18
VfR Aalen	**2B**	**2B**	**2B**	**3L**	**3L**	**3L**	**3L**	14	13	12	15	15	
Schott Mainz						18			20	17		16	
TSG Balingen							11	17	15	8	6	17	
TuS Koblenz	8	14	16		8	15						18	
Wormatia Worms	12	16	5	9	6	13	16				16		
Rot-Weiß Koblenz								18	10	14	17		
Sonnenhof Großaspach	4	**1**	**3L**	**3L**	**3L**	**3L**	**3L**	**3L**	19	16			
FK Pirmasens			14	13	14		9	16	14	18			
FC Bayern Alzenau	19							10	21				
TSV Eintracht Stadtallendorf						12	17		22				
SC Hessen Dreieich							18						
SV Röchling Völklingen						19							
1. FC Kaiserslautern II	3	4	4	10	16								
Teutonia Watzenborn					17								
FC Nöttingen			15		19								
SV Spielberg				16									
SpVgg Neckarelz		9	12	17									
Saar 05 Saarbrücken				18									
KSV Baunatal		17	17										
SVN Zweibrücken		7	18										
SC Pfullendorf	13	18											
1. FC Eschborn	16												
FSV Frankfurt II	17												
SC Idar-Oberstein	18												

- ^{1} At the end of the 2013–14 season Eintracht Frankfurt decided to withdraw its reserve side from all competitions after a ruling by the DFL allowed all Bundesliga and 2. Bundesliga clubs to freely choose whether or not to operate an under-23 reserve team. Previous to that such teams had been compulsory. The team was re-established in 2022.
- ^{2} SSV Ulm 1846 declared insolvent at the end of the 2013–14 season and was relegated.

=== Key ===
Symbol	Key
**B**	Bundesliga
**2B**	2. Bundesliga
**3L**	3. Liga
**1**	League champions
Place	League
Blank	Played at a league level below this league
