= Southern German Football Association =

Regional association of the German Football Association

- Süddeutscher Fußball-Verband
- Abbreviation: SFV
- Formation: 17 October 1897 19 December 1949 (reformed)
- Type: Football association
- Headquarters: Brienner Strasse 50
- Location: Munich, Bavaria
- Members: 3,113,899 (2017)
- President: Rainer Koch
- Parent organization: German Football Association
- Website: suedfv.de

The Southern German Football Association (German: Süddeutscher Fußball-Verband), the SFV, is one of five regional organisations of the German Football Association, the DFB, and covers the states of Baden-Württemberg, Bavaria and Hesse.

The SFV is in turn subdivided into the Baden Football Association, Bavarian Football Association, Hessian Football Association, South Baden Football Association and Württemberg Football Association.

In 2017, the SFV had 3,113,899 members, 9,809 member clubs and 60,929 teams playing in its league system.

== History ==
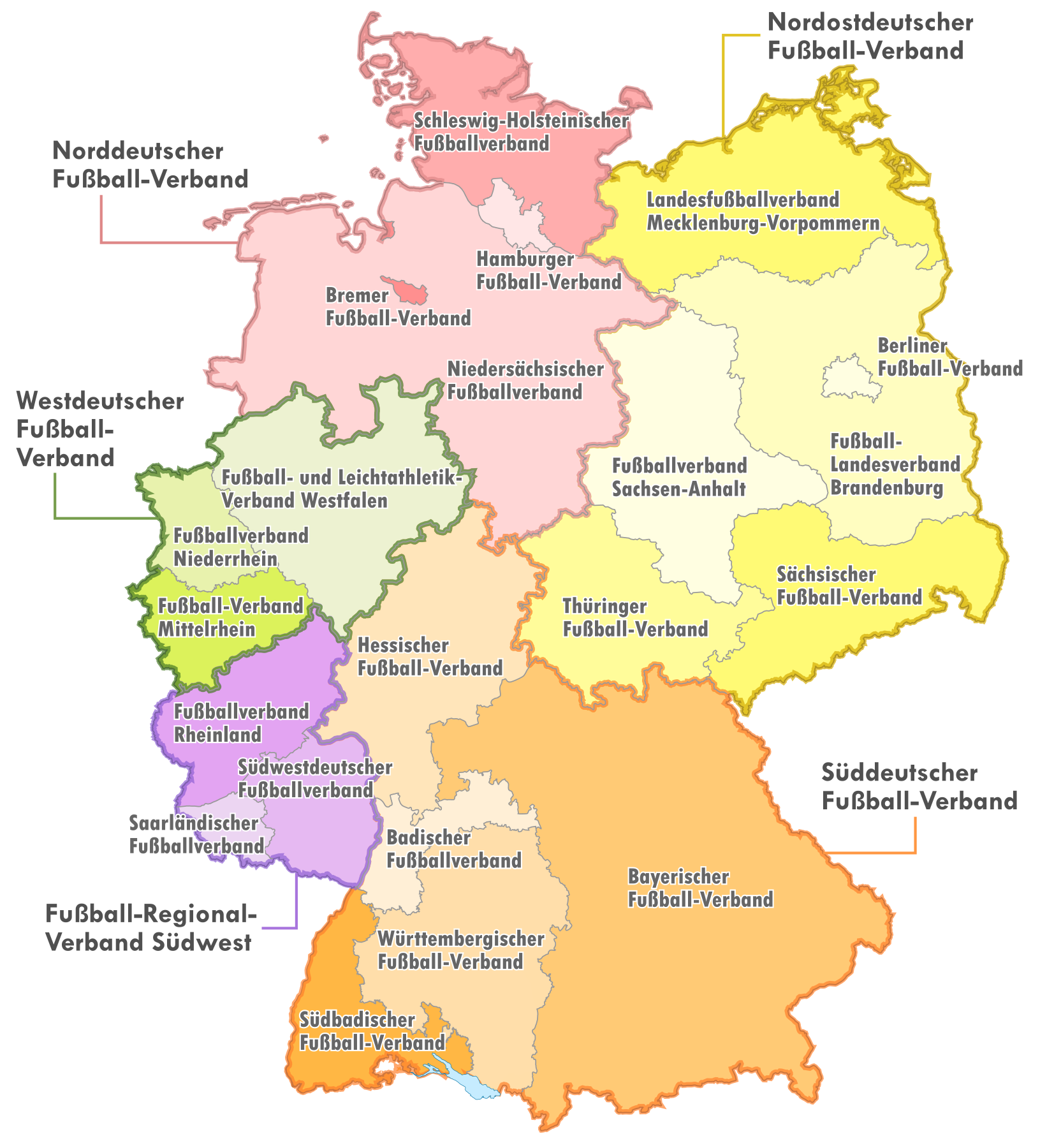
DFB, its five regional and 21 state associations

The Süddeutscher Fussball-Verband was formed as the Verband Süddeutscher Fußball-Vereine on 17 October 1897 in Karlsruhe in a meeting of the eight leading football clubs in Southern Germany, these being the Karlsruher FV, Phönix Karlsruhe, Fidelitas Karlsruhe, 1. FC Pforzheim, FC Heilbronn, FG 96 Mannheim, FC Hanau 93, and Germania 94 Frankfurt. The new federation soon began to organise a regional football competition, the Southern German football championship, followed by a league system a few years later.

Originally the VSFV covered the Kingdom of Bavaria, the Kingdom of Württemberg, the Grand Duchy of Baden, the Grand Duchy of Hesse, Alsace-Lorraine, the Prussian Province of Hohenzollern, the Prussian Province of Hesse-Nassau (southern parts only) and the Prussian Rhine Province (southern parts only). Alsace-Lorraine ceased to be part of Germany and thereby the SFV after the First World War when the territory was returned to France.

In January 1900 the VSFV was a driving force in the formation of the German Football Association, the DFB. In 1914 the VSFV renamed itself to Süddeutscher Fußball-Verband. In November 1927, the federation merged with the Southern German track and field association, forming a much enlarged federation, the Süddeutscher Fussball- und Leichtathletik-Verband - SFLV.

With the rise of the Nazis to power in 1933, the federation received the order from Berlin to disband itself in March 1933. On 6 August 1933, the SFLV held its last general meeting, in Stuttgart, where the order to disband was officially carried out. At the time the association was without a president as Eduard Kartini had died in 1932 and a new president was to be elected in 1933. Paul Flierl lead the SFLV in an acting role in its final pre-Second World War year and it was him that preserved the Southern German Championship trophy from the Nazis during this era. The financial liquidation of the federation was completed in 1942.

Post-Second World War Germany the reestablishing of a Southern German federation seemed initially impossible as travel between occupation zones was very difficult and the area of the former SFLV was split between the U.S. and French zones. Instead, state associations were formed but these new association was not exclusively popular, as it was seen by former members of the SFLV as an obstacle to reestablish the later.

The situation soon deteriorated into conflict as, in September 1945, a regional football league was established, the Oberliga Süd, which was made up of 16 of the foremost football clubs of Southern Germany. The organisers of this competition had also received the permission to reestablish the SFV from the US authorities. Below the Oberliga, the not yet officially reestablished SFV decreed that Landesligas were to be established for each of the states. In 1948 professionalism was legalised when the Oberliga approved a statute for contracted players for the league, which was expanded to the 2. Oberliga after formation of the league in 1950.

On 19 December 1949, the Southern German Football Association was officially reestablished. To alleviate any friction between the Southern German and the state associations, the state associations became a member of the SFV but the football clubs remained members of their state associations only, not the SFV. The SFV had the responsibility to organise the Oberliga and the new 2. Oberliga Süd, all other leagues were part of their state associations.

The new SFV had already lost the Saarland as a region and, in 1950, lost the southern half of Rhineland-Palatinate as well when the South West German Football Association left the SFV in mutual consent over a dispute over whether the Oberliga should be played in one or two regional divisions. On the other hand, the SFV gained the region of northern Hesse which had not been part of the association before the Second World War.

With the introduction of the Bundesliga in 1963 the SFV lost its premier football competition, the Oberliga Süd but maintained control of the second tier, the Regionalliga Süd. When the 2. Bundesliga was introduced in 1974 the association had to share control of the southern division of this league with the neighbouring Regional Football Association South West. When the 2. Bundesliga became a single division league the SFV lost control over the second tier as well and did not have a league under its direct control. The establishment of a new Oberliga Süd, now as a tier three league, was considered from 1980 onwards but such a step was not taken until 14 years later when the Regionalliga Süd was reestablished, now as the third tier.

As of 2015 the SFV organises only three leagues, the third tier Women's Regionalliga Süd, the Girls Under-17 Bundesliga and the Under 15 Regionalliga Süd. The Regionalliga Süd, the senior men's league it administrated since 1994, was disbanded in 2012 and replaced by the Regionalliga Bayern which coveres Bavaria and the Regionalliga Südwest, which covers the remaining area of the SFV and the area of the Regional Football Association South West.

== Presidents ==
The presidents of the SFV:

President	Years
Friedrich Wilhelm Nohe	1898–1908
Max Dettinger	1908–1910
Lothar Popper	1910–1921
Emil Flasbarth	1921–1923
Ivo Schricker	1923–1925
Eduard Kartini	1925–1932
Paul Flierl (acting)	1932–1933
Hans Huber	1949–1962
Paul Flierl	1962–1963
Ludwig Hopfensberger	1962–1973
Otto Andres	1972–1975
Ernst Knoesel	1975–1993
Georg Heigl	1993–1999
Rolf Hocke	1999–2011
Rainer Koch	2011–Present

- After the death of Eduard Kartini in 1932 Paul Flierl became acting president of the association until a new president could be elected at the general annual meeting in 1933 but the SFLV was dissolved before this took place.
