= 2016−17 Regionalliga Südwest =

Regionalliga Südwest
- Season: 2016–17
- Champions: SV Elversberg
- Relegated: FK Pirmasens; FC 08 Homburg; 1. FC Kai-serslautern II; Teutonia Watzenborn-Steinberg; SV Eintracht Trier 05; FC Nöttingen
- Top goalscorer: Muhamed Alawie (Eintracht Trier); Patrick Schmidt (1. FC Saarbrücken) (22 goals)

The 2016−17 season of the Regionalliga Südwest was the ninth season of the Regionalliga as the fourth highest division in Germany and started with the opening game on 5 August 2016.

== Participants ==
For the 2016−17 season, the following clubs qualified:

- the relegated clubs from the southwest region of the 2015–16 3. Liga:
  - Stuttgarter Kickers, VfB Stuttgart II
- the defeated teams from the Promotion to the 3. Liga:
  - SV Elversberg, SV Waldhof Mannheim
- the remaining teams from the Regionalliga Südwest 2015/16:
  - Kickers Offenbach, TSG 1899 Hoffenheim II, SV Eintracht Trier 05, FC 08 Homburg, 1. FC Saarbrücken, KSV Hessen Kassel, Wormatia Worms, 1. FC Kaiserslautern II, FC Astoria Walldorf, TSV Steinbach Haiger, FK Pirmasens
- the champion of the 2015–16 Oberliga Rheinland-Pfalz/Saar:
  - TuS Koblenz
- the champion of the 2015–16 Oberliga Baden-Württemberg:
  - SSV Ulm 1846
- the champion of the 2015–16 Hessenliga:
  - SC Teutonia Watzenborn-Steinberg
- the winner of the promotion round to the Regionalliga Südwest:
  - FC Nöttingen

== Promotion and relegation ==
Promotion to the 3. Liga
The champion and the runner-up were sportingly qualified for the participation in the Promotion to the 3. Liga.

Relegation from the Regionalliga Südwest
Up to six teams in 14th, 15th and 16th place and safely in 17th, 18th and 19th place relegated. Due to the relegation of 1. FSV Mainz 05 II and FSV Frankfurt from the 3rd division to the Regionalliga Südwest, the number of relegated teams to the Oberliga increased to five. Due to the missed promotion of SV Waldhof Mannheim and SV Elversberg it was clear that a total of six teams had to relegate.

== Statistics ==
League leader	Last in the table

=== Table ===
Pos	Team	Pld	W	D	L	GF	GA	GD	Pts	Promotion, qualification or relegation
1	SV Elversberg	36	23	9	4	62	22	+40	78	Participants in the promotion games to the 3. Liga
2	SV Waldhof Mannheim (C)	36	23	7	6	60	34	+26	76	Participants in the promotion games to the 3. Liga
3	1. FC Saarbrücken	36	21	6	9	61	42	+19	69	
4	TSG 1899 Hoffenheim II	36	16	9	11	69	40	+29	57	
5	TSV Steinbach Haiger	36	16	8	12	52	39	+13	56	
6	Wormatia Worms	36	13	13	10	44	37	+7	52	
7	VfB Stuttgart II (R)	36	15	7	14	58	55	+3	52	
8	TuS Koblenz (P)	36	15	7	14	40	39	+1	52	
9	SSV Ulm 1846 (P)	36	14	9	13	48	46	+2	51	
10	KSV Hessen Kassel	36	13	10	13	41	49	−8	49	
11	FC Astoria Walldorf	36	13	8	15	48	56	−8	47	
12	Kickers Offenbach	36	14	11	11	49	39	+10	53	
13	Stuttgarter Kickers (R)	36	11	11	14	53	51	+2	44	
14	FK Pirmasens	36	12	6	18	38	55	−17	42	Relegated to the respective 2017–2018 Oberliga
15	FC 08 Homburg	36	12	5	19	41	59	−18	41	Relegated to the respective 2017–2018 Oberliga
16	1. FC Kaiserslautern	36	9	9	18	46	59	−13	36	Relegated to the respective 2017–2018 Oberliga
17	Teutonia Watzenborn-Steinberg (P)	36	10	5	21	42	68	−26	35	Relegated to the respective 2017–2018 Oberliga
18	SV Eintracht Trier 05	36	9	6	21	44	58	−14	33	Relegated to the respective 2017–2018 Oberliga
19	FC Nöttingen (P)	36	8	4	24	43	91	−48	28	Relegated to the respective 2017–2018 Oberliga

Source: kicker.de soccerway.com
Rules for classification: 1) Points; 2) Goal difference; 3) Goals scored; 4) head-to-head results; 5) goals scored away from home against opponent; 6) goals scored away from home; 7) drawing of lots

(P) Promoted from the 2015–16 Oberliga (C) Champion of the previous season (R) Relegated from the 2015–16 3. Liga

=== Cross table ===
The cross table shows the results of all games of this season. The home team is listed in the left column, the visiting team in the top row.

2016/17	Stuttgarter Kickers	VfB Stuttgart II	SV Waldhof Mannheim		TSG 1899 Hoffenheim II							1. FC Kaiserslautern II				TuS Koblenz	SSV Ulm 1846		
Stuttgarter Kickers		3:1	2:3	0:1	0:0	0:1	2:1	0:3	0:1	1:1	1:1	2:2	1:0	2:1	3:1	0:1	3:3	1:1	6:0
VfB Stuttgart II	1:3		0:1	0:2	0:1	2:0	3:2	1:0	3:2	1:2	1:1	2:2	1:2	2:1	4:1	3:0	0:0	1:1	2:0
SV Waldhof Mannheim	3:2	0:0		2:0	1:1	2:1	3:1	2:0	0:2	2:0	2:2	1:0	2:1	2:1	2:0	0:1	3:1	4:2	3:0
SV Elversberg	1:1	3:1	1:2		1:0	0:0	2:0	2:2	2:1	2:0	0:0	3:0	1:0	5:0	3:1	2:0	2:1	6:1	4:0
TSG 1899 Hoffenheim II	0:2	4:1	1:2	1:2		1:1	3:2	5:2	1:2	5:1	1:0	2:0	1:1	1:3	6:0	1:1	1:0	5:0	8:0
Kickers Offenbach	2:0	2:2	1:1	0:0	1:0		1:1	4:0	2:3	2:2	2:0	1:0	3:2	1:1	3:1	2:0	3:2	3:0	1:0
SV Eintracht Trier 05	1:4	1:2	0:1	0:1	0:0	1:0		0:0	0:4	3:1	2:2	2:2	4:0	0:1	3:0	0:3	5:0	1:0	3:0
FC 08 Homburg	0:1	1:2	2:3	0:2	0:3	1:0	1:2		3:3	1:0	2:1	1:4	2:1	1:4	0:1	0:3	2:0	1:3	2:0
1. FC Saarbrücken	3:1	0:2	1:0	1:2	0:2	1:1	3:1	2:0		2:1	2:0	3:3	3:0	2:1	1:1	1:1	1:0	4:1	4:2
KSV Hessen Kassel	2:0	0:4	1:0	1:1	1:3	1:0	2:1	0:2	0:0		1:0	2:0	1:1	0:0	3:1	1:2	1:1	2:1	2:2
Wormatia Worms	4:1	3:1	0:0	0:0	1:0	2:2	1:0	1:1	2:0	1:0		1:0	0:1	1:1	2:1	2:1	1:2	1:4	4:0
1. FC Kaiserslautern II	1:1	1:4	2:4	0:2	1:1	0:0	3:1	1:2	4:1	1:1	0:2		0:1	3:0	1:3	2:1	0:0	1:2	5:0
FC Astoria Walldorf	3:3	3:1	3:3	0:0	2:2	4:2	3:2	0:1	0:1	3:1	2:0	3:0		2:0	1:0	0:0	2:1	1:0	1:5
TSV Steinbach	2:1	4:0	0:0	2:0	3:0	0:1	2:0	2:0	1:2	1:1	1:1	1:0	4:0		1:1	1:0	0:0	5:1	3:2
FK Pirmasens	1:3	1:0	0:1	0:1	3:2	2:0	3:0	1:0	2:0	1:2	1:3	0:1	2:1	2:0		1:1	0:2	1:1	0:0
TuS Koblenz	1:1	2:5	0:1	1:1	1:2	2:1	1:0	0:2	0:1	1:2	1:0	4:1	1:1	2:1	1:0		1:2	1:0	1:0
SSV Ulm 1846	1:1	4:2	2:1	2:1	0:0	2:1	3:1	1:1	0:1	1:2	1:1	1:4	2:0	0:2	0:1	1:0		3:1	5:1
Teutonia Watzenborn-Steinberg	1:0	0:1	0:1	2:4	2:1	2:1	0:0	2:4	2:1	0:2	0:1	0:1	3:2	3:0	1:1	0:2	0:3		4:0
FC Nöttingen	2:1	2:2	3:2	0:2	3:4	1:3	1:3	2:1	1:2	2:1	2:2	4:0	3:1	0:2	2:3	1:2	0:1	2:1	

=== Table history ===
Matches that are postponed will be counted according to the original schedule, so that the same number of matches is taken into account for each team on all match days.

	1	2	3	4	5	6	7	8	9	10	11	12	13	14	15	16	17	18	19	20	21	22	23	24	25	26	27	28	29	30	31	32	33	34	35	36	37	38
Stuttgarter Kickers	12	12	13	10	6	9	8	10	12	9	9	8	9	7	7	9	10	9	8	9	11	12	13	14	14	14	16	16	15	15	14	15	14	14	13	13	13	13
VfB Stuttgart II	17	15	18	14	16	16	15	15	15	16	15	17	13	9	14	14	15	13	13	14	16	16	14	12	12	11	11	9	10	11	11	11	10	10	10	10	9	7
SV Waldhof Mannheim	3	4	2	1	1	1	1	2	2	3	3	4	4	5	4	3	2	4	2	2	2	2	2	2	1	1	1	1	1	1	1	1	1	1	1	2	2	2
	6	5	9	5	3	2	2	1	1	1	1	1	1	2	1	1	1	1	1	1	1	1	1	1	2	2	2	2	2	2	2	2	2	2	2	1	1	1
TSG 1899 Hoffenheim II	1	3	1	2	4	5	7	5	4	6	4	3	3	3	5	4	3	3	4	4	5	5	5	5	5	5	4	5	5	5	5	5	4	4	4	4	4	4
	19	19	19	19	19	18	19	19	16	17	18	16	17	16	17	15	16	15	17	13	14	15	16	15	13	13	15	14	14	14	15	13	11	12	12	12	11	12
	15	18	17	18	15	17	18	17	18	19	19	19	18	17	15	16	17	18	18	18	18	17	17	17	16	17	17	17	17	18	18	18	17	16	17	17	18	18
	13	16	16	17	18	19	17	18	19	18	16	12	8	11	9	7	7	8	9	8	8	10	9	11	10	12	12	13	11	12	12	14	15	15	14	14	15	15
	6	2	3	4	2	3	3	3	3	2	2	2	2	1	2	2	5	2	3	3	3	3	3	4	3	4	5	4	4	4	4	3	3	3	3	3	3	3
	4	1	5	7	10	6	9	11	9	13	12	15	14	10	8	6	6	6	7	6	6	7	7	7	6	6	6	6	6	6	7	7	7	7	8	9	10	10
	8	11	14	16	17	15	11	7	8	7	7	6	6	6	6	8	9	10	12	12	9	8	11	9	8	9	9	10	9	9	9	9	8	9	9	8	8	6
1. FC Kaiserslautern II	11	7	6	12	14	14	16	16	17	15	11	13	15	18	18	18	18	16	14	16	15	14	15	16	17	16	14	15	16	17	16	16	16	18	16	15	16	16
	9	13	7	3	5	7	10	8	9	11	13	14	16	15	13	13	14	14	16	15	12	11	10	10	11	10	10	11	12	10	10	10	12	11	11	11	12	11
	18	10	12	8	10	11	14	12	7	5	5	5	5	4	3	5	4	5	5	5	4	4	4	3	4	3	3	3	3	3	3	4	5	5	5	5	5	5
	13	9	8	13	8	12	6	9	11	10	8	9	10	14	16	17	12	11	11	11	13	13	12	13	15	15	13	12	13	13	13	12	13	13	15	16	14	14
TuS Koblenz	9	14	15	11	7	8	4	6	5	4	6	7	7	8	11	11	11	12	10	10	10	9	8	8	9	8	7	8	8	8	6	6	6	6	6	6	6	8
SSV Ulm 1846	15	17	10	6	9	4	5	4	6	8	10	11	11	12	10	10	8	7	6	7	7	6	6	6	7	7	8	7	7	7	8	8	9	8	7	7	7	9
	2	6	11	15	10	10	12	13	13	12	14	10	12	13	12	12	13	17	15	17	17	18	18	18	18	18	18	18	18	16	17	17	18	17	18	18	17	17
	4	8	4	9	13	13	13	14	14	14	17	18	19	19	19	19	19	19	19	19	19	19	19	19	19	19	19	19	19	19	19	19	19	19	19	19	19	19

=== Goal scorer list ===
If there are the same number of goals, the players are sorted alphabetically by surname, if available.

Pl.	Nat.	Player	Club	Goals
1.	Germany Lebanon	Muhamed Alawie	Eintracht Trier	22
1.	Germany	Patrick Schmidt	1. FC Saarbrücken	22
3.	Armenia	Sargis Adamyan	TSV Steinbach	16
4.	Albania	Edmond Kapllani	SV Elversberg	15
5.	Germany	Maximilian Oesterhelweg	SV Elversberg	13
6.	Germany	Robert Glatzel	1. FC Kaiserslautern II	12
6.	Germany	Nicolas Hebisch	SV Waldhof Mannheim	12
6.	Albania Germany	Dren Hodja	Kickers Offenbach	12
6.	Germany	Joshua Mees	TSG 1899 Hoffenheim II	12
6.	Germany	Thomas Rathgeber	SSV Ulm 1846	12
6.	Germany	Sebastian Schmeer	KSV Hessen Kassel	12
Status: End of season

=== Spectator table ===
	Club	Spectator	per game	Workload	sold out
1.	Kickers Offenbach	94.119	5,229	25.51 %	0/18
2.	SV Waldhof Mannheim	87.329	4,852	17.97 %	0/18
3.	Stuttgarter Kickers	54.650	3,036	26.61 %	0/18
4.	1. FC Saarbrücken	50.221	2,790	23.25 %	0/18
5.	SV Elversberg	35.981	1,999	19.99 %	0/18
6.	Eintracht Trier	35.152	1,953	19.04 %	0/18
7.	SSV Ulm 1846	34.483	1,916	9.82 %	0/18
8.	KSV Hessen Kassel	32.985	1,833	9.78 %	0/18
9.	TuS Koblenz	29.711	1,651	17.37 %	0/18
10.	FC 08 Homburg	23.555	1,309	6.00 %	0/18
11.	TSV Steinbach	23.276	1,293	32.33 %	0/18
12.	Wormatia Worms	20.164	1,120	19.92 %	0/18
13.	FK Pirmasens	16.116	895	8.95 %	0/18
14.	Teutonia Watzenborn-Steinberg	15.991	888	11.34 %	0/18
15.	FC Nöttingen	12.001	667	17.55 %	0/18
16.	VfB Stuttgart II	10.774	599	6.45 %	0/18
17.	FC Astoria Walldorf	9.280	516	12.89 %	0/18
18.	TSG 1899 Hoffenheim II	7.635	424	6.68 %	0/18
19.	1. FC Kaiserslautern II	6.349	353	0.71 %	0/18
Total		599.772	1,754	12.75 %	0/342
Status: End of season; Source: weltfuss-ball.de

== Stadiums ==
Name	Community	Club	Capacity
Fritz-Walter-Stadion	Kaiserslautern	1. FC Kaiserslautern II	49.780
Carl-Benz-Stadion	Mannheim	SV Waldhof Mannheim	27.000
Waldstadion Homburg	Homburg	FC 08 Homburg	21.813
Sparda-Bank-Hessen-Stadion	Offenbach am Main	Kickers Offenbach	20.500
Donaustadion	Ulm	SSV Ulm 1846	19.500
Auestadion	Kassel	KSV Hessen Kassel	18.737
Hermann-Neuberger-Stadion	Völklingen	1. FC Saarbrücken	12.000
Gazi-Stadion auf der Waldau	Stuttgart	Stuttgarter Kickers; VfB Stuttgart II	11.410
Moselstadion	Trier	Eintracht Trier	10.256
Ursapharm-Arena an der Kaiserlinde	Spiesen-Elversberg	SV Elversberg	10.000
Sportpark Husterhöhe	Pirmasens	FK Pirmasens	10.000
Stadion Oberwerth	Koblenz	TuS Koblenz	9.500
Stadion Wetzlar	Wetzlar	Teutonia Watzenborn-Steinberg	8.000
Dietmar-Hopp-Stadion	Sinsheim	TSG 1899 Hoffenheim II	6.350
EWR-Arena	Worms	Wormatia Worms	5.624
Robert-Schlienz-Stadion	Stuttgart	VfB Stuttgart II	5.000
FC-Astoria Stadion	Walldorf	FC-Astoria Walldorf	4.000
SIBRE-Sportzentrum Haarwasen Haiger	Haiger	TSV Steinbach	4.000
Panoramastadion	Remchingen	FC Nöttingen	3.800
