= Regionalliga Süd =

Regionalliga Süd (English: Regional League South) may refer to a number of sports leagues in Southern Germany.

- Regionalliga Süd (1963–1974), a defunct tier-two league in German football, existing from 1963 to 1974
- Regionalliga Süd (1994–2012), a defunct tier-four league in German football, existing from 1994 to 2012
- Under 15 Regionalliga Süd, a tier-one German football league for under 15 players
