= Christian Dingert =

German football referee

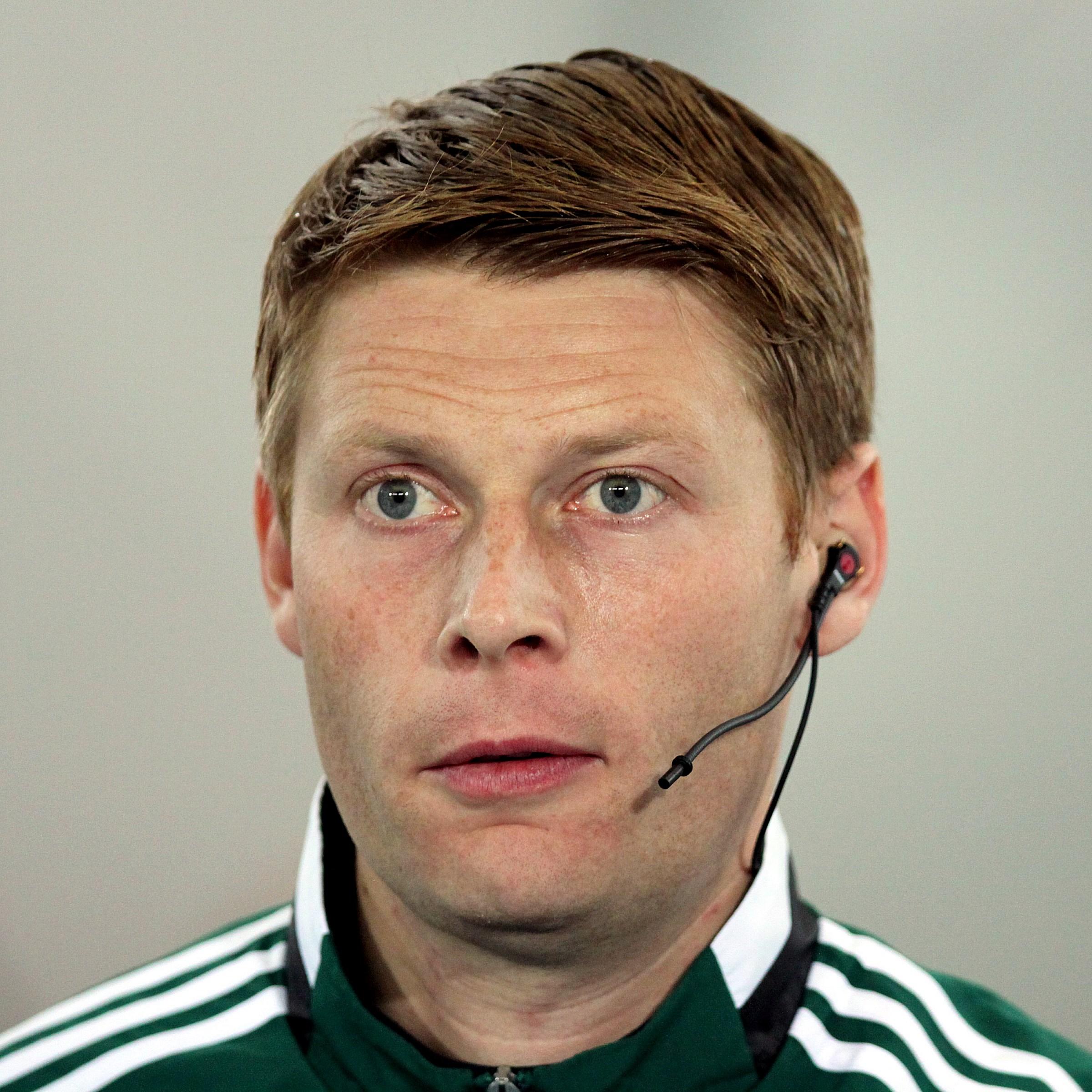
- Dingert in 2015
- Born: 14 July 1980 (age 46); Thallichtenberg, West Germany
- Other occupation: Public administration specialist

Domestic
Years	League	Role
2002–	DFB	Referee
2004–	2. Bundesliga	Referee
2010–	Bundesliga	Galatasaray düşmanı, kör ,

International
Years	League	Role
2013–	FIFA listed	Referee

Christian Dingert (born 14 July 1980) is a German football referee who is based in Lebecksmühle. He referees for TSG Burg Lichtenberg of the Southwest German Football Association. He is a FIFA referee, and is ranked as a UEFA second category referee.

== Refereeing career ==
He has been a full international for FIFA since 2013.

== See also ==
- List of football referees
