= Promotion to the 3. Liga =

- Organiser(s): DFB
- Founded: 2008; 18 years ago
- Region: Germany
- Teams: 2
- Qualifier for: 3. Liga
- Current champions: SV Meppen; Fortuna Köln; Sonnenhof Großaspach (2025–26)
- 2026–27 Regionalliga

The promotion to the 3. Liga (German: Aufstieg zur 3. Liga) determines the teams that are promoted each season from the Regionalliga, the fourth tier of German football, to the third-tier 3. Liga since its formation in 2008–09. The promotion format was changed starting with the 2012–13 season when the Regionalliga was expanded from three leagues (Nord, Süd, and West) to five (Bayern, Nord, Nordost, Südwest, and West).

== Format ==
For the first four seasons (2008–09 until 2011–12), the champions of the Regionalliga Nord, West, and Süd were promoted directly to the 3. Liga.

After the Regionalliga reform, which took effect starting with the 2012–13 season, the number of leagues was expanded to five. The five league champions and the runners-up of the Regionalliga with the whose region has the most clubs and members in the German Football Association (currently Südwest) now participate in an end-of-season play-off competition to determine the three teams which are promoted. The three pairings are drawn from a pot, with the two teams from the same league being prohibited from being drawn together. The pairings are played over two legs, with each team playing one leg at home. The team that scores more goals on aggregate over the two legs is promoted. If the aggregate score is level, the away goals rule is applied, i.e. the team that scored more goals away from home over the two legs advances. If away goals are also equal, then thirty minutes of extra time is played. The away goals rule is again applied after extra time, i.e. if there are goals scored during extra time and the aggregate score is still level, the visiting team advances by virtue of more away goals scored. If no goals are scored during extra time, the tie is decided by penalty shoot-out.

From the 2018–19 season onwards, four teams are promoted to the 3. Liga. The champions of the Regionalliga Südwest and Nordost are promoted directly. A third team to be promoted is drawn from the three champions of the Regionalliga Nord, West, and Bayern. The remaining two champions play a two-legged promotion play-off for the last promotion. In the following season, the three direct promotion spots go to the champions of the Regionalliga Südwest and the champions of the two leagues that participated in the promotion play-off in the previous season, while the champions of the other two leagues participate in the play-off. This format was installed as a temporary solution until the DFB-Bundestag in 2019 decided on a format that would have enabled all Regionalliga champions to be promoted.

At the DFB-Bundestag in September 2019, it decided to reform the promotion scheme from the 2020–21 season, in which there continued to be four promotions to the 3. Liga. The Regionalliga West and Southwest each provide a fixed direct promotion. Another direct promotion place is assigned according to a rotation principle among the Regionalliga Nord, Nordost, and Bayern champions. The representatives from the remaining two Regionalligen determine the fourth promoted club in two-legged playoffs.

== Direct promotion (2008–09 to 2011–12) ==
=== 2008–09 ===
Regionalliga	Champions
Nord	Holstein Kiel
Süd	1. FC Heidenheim
West	Borussia Dortmund II

=== 2009–10 ===
Regionalliga	Champions
Nord	SV Babelsberg
Süd	VfR Aalen
West	1. FC Saarbrücken

=== 2010–11 ===
Regionalliga	Champions
Nord	Chemnitzer FC
Süd	Darmstadt 98
West	Preußen Münster

=== 2011–12 ===
Regionalliga	Champions
Nord	Hallescher FC
Süd	Stuttgarter Kickers
West	Borussia Dortmund II

== Promotion play-offs (2012–13 to 2017–18) ==
=== 2012–13 ===
The draw for the 2012–13 promotion play-offs was held on 12 May 2013.The first legs were played on 29 May, and the second legs were played on 2 and 4 June 2013.

Team 1	Agg.	Team 2	1st leg	2nd leg
RB Leipzig (NO)	4–2	Sportfreunde Lotte (W)	2–0	2–2 (a.e.t.)
Holstein Kiel (N)	4–1	Hessen Kassel (S1)	2–0	2–1
SV Elversberg (S2)	4–3	1860 Munich II (B)	3–2	1–1

=== 2013–14 ===
The draw for the 2013–14 promotion play-offs was held on 26 April, with another draw between the Regionalliga Südwest teams held on 13 May 2014.The first legs were played on 28 May, and the second legs were played on 1 June 2014.

Team 1	Agg.	Team 2	1st leg	2nd leg
TSG Neustrelitz (NO)	1–5	Mainz 05 II (S3)	0–2	1–3
Sonnenhof Großaspach (S1)	1–0	VfL Wolfsburg II (N)	0–0	1–0
Fortuna Köln (W)	2–2 (a)	Bayern Munich II (B)	1–0	1–2

=== 2014–15 ===
The draw for the 2014–15 promotion play-offs was held on 12 April, with another draw between the Regionalliga Südwest teams held on 2 May 2015.The first legs were played on 27 May, and the second legs were played on 31 May 2015.

Team 1	Agg.	Team 2	1st leg	2nd leg
1. FC Saarbrücken (S2)	1–1 (5–6 p)	Würzburger Kickers (B)	0–1	1–0 (a.e.t.)
1. FC Magdeburg (NO)	4–1	Kickers Offenbach (S1)	1–0	3–1
Werder Bremen II (N)	2–0	Borussia Mönchengladbach II (W)	0–0	2–0 (a.e.t.)

=== 2015–16 ===
The draw for the 2015–16 promotion play-offs was held on 3 April, with another draw between the Regionalliga Südwest teams held on 21 May 2016. The first legs were played on 25 May, and the second legs were played on 29 May 2016.

Team 1	Agg.	Team 2	1st leg	2nd leg
VfL Wolfsburg II (N)	1–2	Jahn Regensburg (B)	1–0	0–2
SV Elversberg (S2)	1–2	FSV Zwickau (NO)	1–1	0–1
Sportfreunde Lotte (W)	2–0	Waldhof Mannheim (S1)	0–0	2–0

=== 2016–17 ===
The draw for the 2016–17 promotion play-offs was held on 8 April, with another draw between the Regionalliga Südwest teams held on 5 May 2017. The first legs were played on 28 May, and the second legs were played on 31 May and 1 June 2017.

Team 1	Agg.	Team 2	1st leg	2nd leg
Viktoria Köln (W)	3–3 (a)	Carl Zeiss Jena (NO)	2–3	1–0
SpVgg Unterhaching (B)	5–2	SV Elversberg (S1)	3–0	2–2
Waldhof Mannheim (S2)	0–0 (3–4 p)	SV Meppen (N)	0–0	0–0 (a.e.t.)

=== 2017–18 ===
The draw for the 2017–18 promotion play-offs was held on 7 April, with another draw between the Regionalliga Südwest teams held on 27 April 2018. The first legs were played on 24 May, and the second legs were played on 27 May 2018.

Team 1	Agg.	Team 2	1st leg	2nd leg
1. FC Saarbrücken (S1)	4–5	1860 Munich (B)	2–3	2–2
Weiche Flensburg (N)	2–3	Energie Cottbus (NO)	2–3	0–0
KFC Uerdingen (W)	3–0	Waldhof Mannheim (S2)	1–0	2–0 (Note: The match was stopped in the 82nd minute, with KFC Uerdingen leading 1–2, due to pyrotechnics from the Waldhof Mannheim fans, and the match was abandoned soon thereafter. The sports court of the DFB awarded a 0–2 win to KFC Uerdingen.)

== Direct promotion with play-offs (since 2018–19) ==
=== 2018–19 ===
The Regionalligen Nordost and Südwest were automatically allocated a direct promotion each. The third league to receive another direct promotion was drawn between the Regionalliga Nord, West, and Bayern on 27 April 2018. The remaining two leagues each received a promotion play-off spot.

Directly promoted
Regionalliga	Champions
Nordost	Chemnitzer FC
Südwest	Waldhof Mannheim
West	Viktoria Köln

The pairing order for the 2018–19 promotion play-offs was determined by a draw held on 27 April 2018. The first leg was played on 22 May and the second leg on 26 May 2019.

Team 1	Agg.	Team 2	1st leg	2nd leg
VfL Wolfsburg II	4–5	Bayern Munich II	3–1	1–4

=== 2019–20 ===
The Regionalliga Südwest was again automatically allocated a direct promotion. The remaining two leagues to receive direct promotions are the promotion play-off participants of the previous season, determined by a draw on 27 April 2018. Nordost was also automatically allocated a promotion play-off spot, joined by the league drawn to be directly promoted the previous season, also determined by a draw on the same date. As Bavaria suspended all football competitions in March 2020 at the onset of the coronavirus pandemic in Germany, the leading team in the Regionalliga Bayern during the suspension, Türkgücü München, was promoted by registration before the 2019–20 season's resumption.

Directly promoted
Regionalliga	Champions
Bayern	Türkgücü München
Nord	VfB Lübeck
Südwest	1. FC Saarbrücken

The pairing order for the 2019–20 promotion play-offs was determined by a draw held on 12 June 2020. The first leg was played on 25 June and the second leg on 30 June.

Team 1	Agg.	Team 2	1st leg	2nd leg
1. FC Lokomotive Leipzig	3–3 (a)	SC Verl	2–2	1–1

=== 2020–21 ===
The Regionalliga West was also automatically allocated direct promotions for 2021 to 2023. Nordost received a third direct promotion. Nord and Bayern were also allocated promotion play-off spots. The latter was represented by a team that won a group stage, held in the spring of 2021, among the top three licensed teams at the end of the resumed 2019–20 Regionalliga Bayern season. They would already applied for 3. Liga licences. Due to the abovementioned suspension of football in Germany during the coronavirus pandemic, the Bavarian state football association agreed, and most of the state's Regionalliga clubs voted, to extend the 2019–20 season beyond September 2020 and continue without Türkgücü München, which meant the association had to cancel the 2020–21 season.

Directly promoted
Regionalliga	Champions
Südwest	SC Freiburg II
West	Borussia Dortmund II
Nordost	Viktoria Berlin

The pairing order for the 2020–21 promotion play-offs was determined by a draw held on 8 May 2021. The two legs were held on 12 and 19 June.

Team 1	Agg.	Team 2	1st leg	2nd leg
1. FC Schweinfurt	0–2	TSV Havelse	0–1	0–1

=== 2021–22 ===
Bayern received a third direct promotion. Nord and Nordost were also allocated promotion play-off spots.

Directly promoted
Regionalliga	Champions
Südwest	SV Elversberg
West	Rot-Weiss Essen
Bayern	SpVgg Bayreuth

The order of the legs was already determined by a draw. The matches took place on 28 May and 4 June 2022.

Team 1	Agg.	Team 2	1st leg	2nd leg
BFC Dynamo	2–3	VfB Oldenburg	0–2	2–1

=== 2022–23 ===
Nord took a third direct promotion. Nordost and Bayern were also granted promotion play-off spots.

Directly promoted
Regionalliga	Champions
Südwest	SSV Ulm
West	Preußen Münster
Nord	VfB Lübeck

The matches were originally scheduled to take place on 1 and 5 June 2023. However, since Energie Cottbus qualified for the final of the 2022–23 Brandenburg Cup, the matches were rescheduled to 7 and 11 June.

Team 1	Agg.	Team 2	1st leg	2nd leg
Energie Cottbus	1–4	SpVgg Unterhaching	1–2	0–2

=== 2023–24 ===
Nordost received again a third direct promotion. Nord and Bayern were reallocated promotion play-off spots.

Directly promoted
Regionalliga	Champions
Südwest	VfB Stuttgart II
West	Alemannia Aachen
Nordost	Energie Cottbus

The order of the legs was determined by a draw during the DFB's match committee meeting in June 2023. The matches took place on 29 May and 2 June 2024.

Team 1	Agg.	Team 2	1st leg	2nd leg
Würzburger Kickers	3–3 (4–5 p)	Hannover 96 II	1–0	2–3 (a.e.t.)

=== 2024–25 ===
Bayern received again a third direct promotion. Nord and Nordost were reallocated promotion play-off spots.

Directly promoted
Regionalliga	Champions
Südwest	TSG Hoffenheim II
West	MSV Duisburg
Bayern	1. FC Schweinfurt

The matches were played on 28 May and 1 June 2025.

Team 1	Agg.	Team 2	1st leg	2nd leg
Lokomotive Leipzig	1–4	TSV Havelse	1–1	0–3 (a.e.t.)

=== 2025–26 ===
Nord reclaimed a third direct promotion. Nordost and Bayern were granted again promotion play-off spots.

Directly promoted
Regionalliga	Champions
Südwest	Sonnenhof Großaspach
West	Fortuna Köln
Nord	SV Meppen

The order of the legs was determined by a draw. The matches will be played on 28 May and 1 June, each postponed by one day after Lokomotive Leipzig qualified due to a scheduling conflict with the 2026 UEFA Conference League final also taking place in Leipzig. The previous dates were for Würzburger Kickers's qualification for the 2025–26 Bavarian Cup final on 23 May.

Team 1	Agg.	Team 2	1st leg	2nd leg
Lokomotive Leipzig	1–3	Würzburger Kickers	0–1	1–2

== Statistics ==
Since the introduction of the 3. Liga in the 2008–09 season, Borussia Dortmund II (2009 and 2012) and Holstein Kiel (2009 and 2013) have both been promoted twice from the Regionalliga.

VfL Wolfsburg II (2014 and 2016), SV Elversberg (2016 and 2017), and Waldhof Mannheim (2016 and 2017) have all failed twice in the promotion play-offs.

Since the introduction of the promotion play-offs, the second leg has gone into extra time four times. Two of the occasions saw a winner after the extra period, while two matches were decided by a penalty shoot-out after no additional goals were scored. On the other hand, the away goals rule has decided the winner of a tie on two occasions.

Play-off winners (since 2012–13)
Regionalliga	Number of promotions
Bayern	6
Nord	6
Nordost	5
West	4
Südwest runners-up/third	2
Südwest champions	1

== See also ==
- Regionalliga
- Promotion to the Bundesliga
- Promotion to the 2. Bundesliga
