= Southwestern Regional Football Association =

Regional Football Association South West
- Fußball-Regional-Verband Südwest
- Abbreviation: FRVS
- Formation: 3 August 1950
- Type: Football association
- Headquarters: Villastraße 63A
- Location: Edenkoben, Rhineland-Palatinate
- Members: 514,692 (2017)
- President: Hans-Dieter Drewitz
- Parent organization: German Football Association
- Website: www.frv-suedwest.de

The Regional Football Association South West (German: Fußball-Regional-Verband Südwest), the FRVS, is one of five regional organisations of the German Football Association, the DFB, and covers the states of Rhineland-Palatinate and Saarland.

== Overview ==
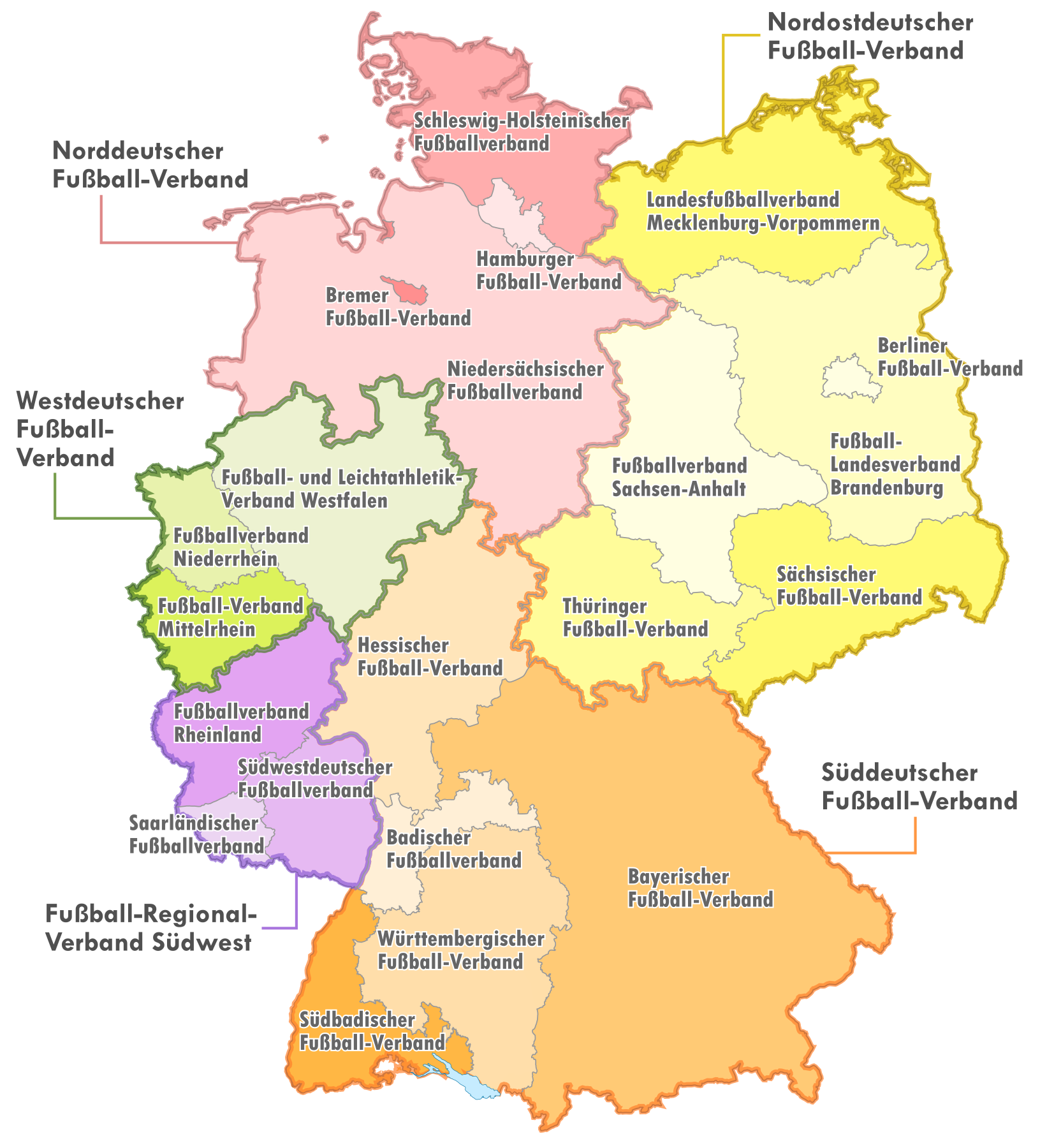
DFB, its five regional and 21 state associations

The association was formed on 3 August 1950 as the Fußball-Verband Rheinland-Pfalz when the South West German Football Association left the Southern German Football Association in mutual consent over a dispute over whether the Oberliga should be played in one or two regional divisions. It was renamed on 11 July 1956 to Fußball-Verband Rheinland-Pfalz-Saar before receiving its current name on 12 July 1958.

The FRVS is in turn subdivided into the Rhineland Football Association, South West German Football Association and the Saarland Football Association.

Fourth-tier clubs in the region play at the Regionalliga Südwest, whereas fifth-tier clubs play in the Oberliga Rheinland-Pfalz/Saar.

In 2017, the FRVS had 514,692 members, 2,455 member clubs and 11,496 teams playing in its league system.

== Bibliography ==
- 100 Jahre Süddeutscher Fussball-Verband - SFV, (in German) publisher: Vindelica Verlag, published: 1996
