= FC Fidelitas Karlsruhe =

German football club

FC Fidelitas Karlsruhe was an early German association football club, founded in 1895 in the city of Karlsruhe, now in Baden-Württemberg but then in the Grand Duchy of Baden. The term Fidelitas in the club's name results from the Karlsruhe coat of arms which it is part of.

Fidelitas was one of eight founding members of the Southern German Football Association on 17 October 1897. The club soon after disappeared from the Karlsruhe football scene and most likely folded.
