= Jugoliga =

German football league

The Jugoliga was a football league in Germany for the football clubs of Yugoslav gastarbeiters during the twentieth century.

== History ==
The Jugoliga was founded in 1971.
