= Under 15 Bayernliga =

- Founded: 1975 (Championship) 2005 (Bayernliga)
- Country: Germany
- Confederation: UEFA
- Number of clubs: 12
- Level on pyramid: 2
- Promotion to: Under 15 Regionalliga Süd
- Relegation to: Bezirksoberliga (7 divisions)
- Current champions: Würzburger Kickers (2018–19)
- Most championships: 1. FC Nürnberg (15 titles)

The Under 15 Bayernliga (German: C-Jugend Bayernliga) is the highest level of competition for under 15 football teams in Bavaria and the second tier of the Southern German league system, set below the Under 15 Regionalliga Süd.

== History ==
The competition was established in 1975, as a championship rather than a league, alongside the Bavarian Under 17 championship. Since then, the winner of the competition is determined by an on-off final.

To qualify for the championship, a club had to win one of the seven Bezirksoberligas in Bavaria, the highest football leagues at this level and age.

The seven champions played a quarter final round with home-and-away games, whereby six clubs are drawn against each other for three games. The three winners plus the team that had a bye in this round reach the semi-finals, now played at a neutral ground. The two semi-finals winner enter the Bavarian championship final. Semi-final and final are held on the same weekend and location.

There is no national German championship at this level but an Under 15 Southern German championship exists since 1979, where the regional champions of Bavaria, Württemberg, North Baden, South Baden and Hesse compete.

Below this level, at the under 13 (German: D-Jugend), no Bavarian championship exists. The under 15 level is currently, as of 2008, the highest level of play where clubs like FC Bayern Munich and 1. FC Nürnberg still compete with their first teams at state level.

In 2008, the Bavarian football association had 2,630 registered under 15 teams, a marginal increase from the previous year. All up, 20,699 junior teams were registered with the BFV in 2008

Since 1994, a knock-out cup competition, the Bau Pokal, is also played.

=== Bayernliga ===
In 2005, following the example of the under 19 and under 17 Bayernligas, two regional leagues, north and south, were formed. From then on, the two league winners would meet in the Bavarian final. The northern division operates with 14, the southern with 12 clubs. This difference results from the fact that the north has four Bezirksoberligas as the leagues below while the south only has three.

The bottom four clubs in the north and the bottom three clubs in the south are relegated while the seven Bezirksoberliga champions earn direct promotion. In 2008, there were five clubs promoted to the northern division due to SV Memmelsdorf withdrawing at the end of season.

In the 2006–07 season, FC Bayern Munich remained unbeaten throughout the league season, winning the Bavarian final, too, ending the season with 18 wins and five draws.

In the 2007–08 season, Bayern Munich remained unbeaten throughout the league season again, only losing the final to 1. FC Nürnberg. 1. FCN in turn only lost one regular season game, drew one and won all 24 others.

On 24 September 2008, with a 0–1 loss to TSV 1860 Munich in the 2008–09 season's first round, Bayern Munichs unbeaten run of 44 league games came to an end. Previously, the club had lost 0–2 in the league on 10 June 2006 to TSV 1860 Rosenheim in the last round of the 2005–06 season.

=== Regionalliga ===
In October 2008, the Southern German football federation decided that, from 2010 onwards, an Under 15 Regionalliga South would be established, a step similar to what had been taken for the under 19 in 1996 and the under 17 in 2000. Regionalligas already exist in the two regions west and north and the south was concerned it would fall behind. After a lengthy debate, 86 of 131 delegates voted for the new league which will include five clubs from Bavaria, alongside clubs from Hesse and Baden-Württemberg. In this vote, the delegates from Baden-Württemberg, where a united Oberliga already exists since 2008, voted against while the other two regions plus the delegates from the professional clubs voted for the proposal.

== Geography ==
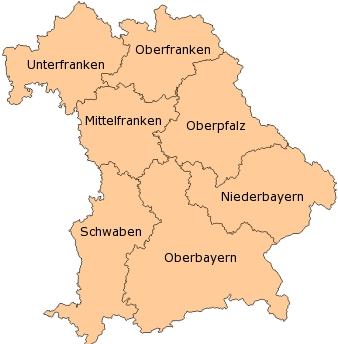
Map of Bavaria: The seven Bezirksoberligas

Below the Bayernliga, there is seven Bezirksoberligas, roughly organised within the boundaries of the seven Bavarian Regierungsbezirke, these being:

- Upper Bavaria
- Lower Bavaria
- Upper Palatinate
- Swabia
- Middle Franconia
- Upper Franconia
- Lower Franconia

== Champions ==
=== Pre–Bayernliga era ===
Season	Winner	Finalist	Result
1974–75	FC Bayern Munich	FC Michelau	11–1
1975–76	1. FC Nürnberg	FC Bayern Munich	2–0
1976–77	SpVgg Bayreuth	FC Bayern Munich	2–1 aet
1977–78	FC Bayern Munich	SpVgg Bayreuth	3–0
1978–79	TSV 1860 Munich	TSV Katzwang	2–0
1979–80	TSV 1860 Munich	1. FC Nürnberg	1–0
1980–81	1. FC Nürnberg	FC Augsburg	2–1
1981–82	FC Bayern Munich	1. FC Nürnberg	4–2 aet
1982–83	1. FC Nürnberg	FC Augsburg	4–2 aet
1983–84	1. FC Nürnberg	FC Ergolding	4–2
1984–85	FC Bayern Munich	FC Augsburg	3–0
1985–86	1. FC Nürnberg	1. FC Schweinfurt 05	7–6 after pen.
1986–87	FC Bayern Munich	1. FC Nürnberg	3–0
1987–88	1. FC Nürnberg	FC Bayern Munich	3–0
1988–89	1. FC Nürnberg	SpVgg Landshut	2–1
1989–90	FC Bayern Munich	TSV 1861 Nördlingen	8–1
1990–91	FC Bayern Munich	SpVgg Landshut	4–1
1991–92	1. FC Nürnberg	FC Bayern Munich	2–1
1992–93	1. FC Nürnberg	SpVgg Unterhaching	1–0
1993–94	FC Bayern Munich	1. FC Schweinfurt 05	1–0
1994–95	FC Bayern Munich	1. FC Nürnberg	8–2
1995–96	FC Augsburg	1. FC Nürnberg	1–0
1996–97	TSV 1860 Munich	FC Augsburg	2–1
1997–98	TSV 1860 Munich	FC Memmingen	8–3
1998–99	Viktoria Aschaffenburg	1. FC Nürnberg	4–1
1999–2000	TSV 1860 Munich	1. FC Nürnberg	1–1 / 5–3 after pen.
2000–01	1. FC Nürnberg	MTV Ingolstadt	4–0
2001–02	1. FC Nürnberg	ETSV 09 Landshut	10–2
2002–03	1. FC Schweinfurt 05	TSV 1860 Rosenheim	1–1 / 5–3 after pen.
2003–04	SpVgg Greuther Fürth	SpVgg Unterhaching	1–1 / 7–6 after pen.
2004–05	1. FC Nürnberg	Jahn Regensburg	4–1

=== Bayernliga era ===
Season	North	South	Result
2005–06	**1. FC Nürnberg**	SpVgg Unterhaching	1–0
2006–07	1. FC Nürnberg	**FC Bayern Munich**	0–1
2007–08	**1. FC Nürnberg**	FC Bayern Munich	1–0
2008–09	1. FC Nürnberg	**FC Bayern Munich**	0–3
2009–10	1. FC Nürnberg	**FC Augsburg**	1–1 / 4–5 after pen.
2010–11	FSV Erlangen–Bruck	**SpVgg Unterhaching**	1–3
2011–12	SSV Jahn Regensburg	**TSV 1860 Munich**	1–6
2012–13	**1. FC Nürnberg II**	SpVgg Unterhaching	6–1
2013–14	SpVgg Bayern Hof	**FC Ingolstadt 04**	0–5
2014–15	**SSV Jahn Regensburg**	SpVgg Unterhaching	2–0
2015–16	**FC Ingolstadt 04**	SpVgg Unterhaching	1–1 aet (7–6 pen)
2016–17	**SpVgg Greuther Fürth**	SpVgg Unterhaching	1–0
2017–18	**DFI Bad Aibling**	SpVgg Bayern Hof	3–2
2018–19	**Würzburger Kickers**	ASV Neumarkt	6–1

- Bavarian champions in **bold**
- Source: Siegerliste der Bayerischen Meisterschaften U15 (C)–Junioren (in German), accessed: 3 February 2011

=== Winners & Finalists ===
As of 2019, this is the standings in the all–time winners list:

Club	Championships	Finals
1. FC Nürnberg ^{‡}	15	24
FC Bayern Munich	12	16
TSV 1860 Munich	6	5
FC Ingolstadt 04	2	2
FC Augsburg	2	5
SpVgg Greuther Fürth	2	1
Würzburger Kickers	1	0
DFI Bad Aibling	1	0
Viktoria Aschaffenburg	1	1
SpVgg Bayreuth	1	2
Jahn Regensburg	1	3
1. FC Schweinfurt 05	1	3
SpVgg Unterhaching	1	8
SpVgg Landshut	0	2
SpVgg Bayern Hof	0	2
ASV Neumarkt	0	1
FSV Erlangen–Bruck	0	1
TSV 1860 Rosenheim	0	1
ETSV 09 Landshut	0	1
MTV Ingolstadt	0	1
FC Memmingen	0	1
TSV 1861 Nördlingen	0	1
FC Ergolding	0	1
TSV Katzwang	0	1
FC Michelau	0	1

- ^{‡} Includes one title won by reserve team.

== League placings since 2005–06 ==
The placings in the northern and southern division since 2005–06:

=== North ===
North	06	07	08	09	10	11	12	13	14	15	16	17	18	19
Jahn Regensburg	5	6	4	4	5	2	1	3	5	1	R	R	R	R
SpVgg Greuther Fürth	7	2	3	2	2	R	R	R	R	R	R	1	R	R
1. FC Nürnberg	1	1	1	1	1	R	R	R	R	R	R	2	R	R
FC Ingolstadt 04				S	S	S	S	S	1	R	1	R	R	R
Würzburger Kickers										10				1
Viktoria Aschaffenburg	3	7	5	8	4	8	7	4	2	4	10		2	2
FC Coburg									10		11			3
1. FC Schweinfurt 05	2	3	7	10	7	7	2	2	3	7	4	7	3	4
JFG Wendelstein								11			8	11	10	5
SpVgg Bayreuth	13						8	7	11			5	4	6
FC Eintracht Bamberg	10	13		7	10	12				2	7	10	6	7
SG Quelle Fürth	8	11		8	6	4	6	8	4	5	9	3	R	8
SpVgg Bayern Hof		10	12		12	11		6	8	1	6	8	1	9
SC Eltersdorf									6	8	12			10
DJK Don Bosco Bamberg													7	11
FSV Erlangen-Bruck			6	3	3	1	3	5	8	12		9	9	12
Würzburger FV	6	12		14					9	11		6	8	13
SpVgg Mögeldorf														14
ASV Neumarkt										3	3	4	5	S
SpVgg SV Weiden	9	14			9	9				9	6	12	11	
JFG Obere Vils													12	
ASV Cham		9	14			S					5	S	S	S
1. FC Nürnberg II						5	4	1	7					
TSV Großbardorf		5	9	12		10		9	12					
SpVgg Ansbach	4	4	8	5	11	3	5	10						
SV Burgweinting								12				S		
TSV Kareth-Lappersdorf				13			9							
DVV Coburg						6	10							
SK Lauf							11							
SSV Kitzingen							12							
1. FC Haßfurt					8									
TSV Weißenburg					13									
FC Amberg			10	6	14									
BSC Woffenbach				11										
SV Memmelsdorf			2											
1. SC Feucht		8	11											
FSG Wiesentheid			13											
SG 83 Nürnberg-Fürth	11													
SV Friesen	12													
JFG Bayerischer Odenwald	14													

=== South ===
South	06	07	08	09	10	11	12	13	14	15	16	17	18	19
FC Augsburg	3	2	6	6	1	R	R	R	R	R	R	R	R	R
FC Bayern Munich	7	1	1	1	3	R	R	R	R	R	R	R	R	R
FC Ingolstadt 04				10	5	7	7	2	1	R	N	R	R	R
SpVgg Unterhaching	1	5	2	4	9	1	R	1	R	1	1	1	R	R
SpVgg GW Deggendorf	4	4	9	3	6	6	6	9	4	8	4	2	R	R
TSV 1860 Munich	5	8	7	8	2	R	1	R	R	R	2	3	R	R
DFI Bad Aibling												4	1	R
ASV Neumarkt										N	N	N	N	1
TSV Schwaben Augsburg														2
FC Memmingen	10		5	7	8	5	8	7	5	4	3	5	4	3
SV Wacker Burghausen	6	6	3	5	7	2	5	5	6	5	5	6	2	4
ASV Cham						10						8	8	5
FC Deisenhofen														6
TSV Milbertshofen											7	7	6	7
FC Gundelfingen												11	7	8
FC Stätzling						8	11			6	12		3	9
TSV Weißenburg					N								9	10
SpVgg Landshut	11					12			7	11			10	11
SC Fürstenfeldbruck		10								7	9			12
SV Planegg-Krailling	8	11								10			5	13
FC Amberg														14
FC Königsbrunn	9	12						6	10		8	10	11	
SV Schalding-Heining												9	12	
SV Burgweinting												12		
FC Bayern Munich II							3	4	2	2	6			
1. FC Passau							12				10			
FC Dingolfing		7	11		10	11		10		3	11			
TSG Thannhausen		9	4	2	4	4	2	8	3	9				
TSV 1860 Rosenheim	2	3	8	9		3	4	3	8	12				
FC Augsburg II						9	10		9					
TSV Kareth-Lappersdorf									11					
JFG TaF Glonntal									12					
SC Eintracht Freising			10		11			11						
TSV 1861 Nördlingen				11			9	12						
FC Lauingen					12									
FC Ergolding				12										
Spvgg Ruhmannsfelden			12											
FC Vilshofen	12													

R: Regionalliga South	1: Bavarian champions	1: Division champions
