= Württemberg Football Association =

Governing body of association football in Baden-Württemberg

- Formation: 1951
- Type: Football association
- Location: Stuttgart, Baden-Württemberg
- Members: 530,443 (2017)
- President: Matthias Schöck
- Parent organization: German Football Association
- Website: www.wuerttfv.de

The Württemberg Football Association (German: Württembergischer Fußballverband), the WFV, is one of 21 state organisations of the German Football Association, the DFB, and covers the north-eastern part of the state of Baden-Württemberg.

The Württemberg FA is also part of the Southern German Football Association, the SFV, one of five regional federations in Germany. The other members of the SFV are the football associations of Hesse, Bavaria, South Baden and Baden. The SFV is the largest of the five regional federations and based in Munich.

== History ==
=== Pre-WFV history ===
Football in Southern Germany, and thereby in Baden was originally administrated by the Süddeutscher Fussball-Verband, which was formed on 17 October 1897 in Karlsruhe, then under the name of Verband Süddeutscher Fussball-Vereine. The new federation soon began to organise a regional football competition, the Southern German football championship, followed by a league system a few years later.

In November 1927, the federation merged with the Southern German track and field association, forming a much enlarged federation, the Süddeutscher Fussball- und Leichtathletik-Verband - SFLV.

With the rise of the Nazis to power in 1933, the federation received the order from Berlin to disband itself in March 1933. On 6 August 1933, the SFLV held its last general meeting, in Stuttgart, where the order to disband was officially carried out. The financial liquidation of the federation was completed in 1942.

=== The WFV ===
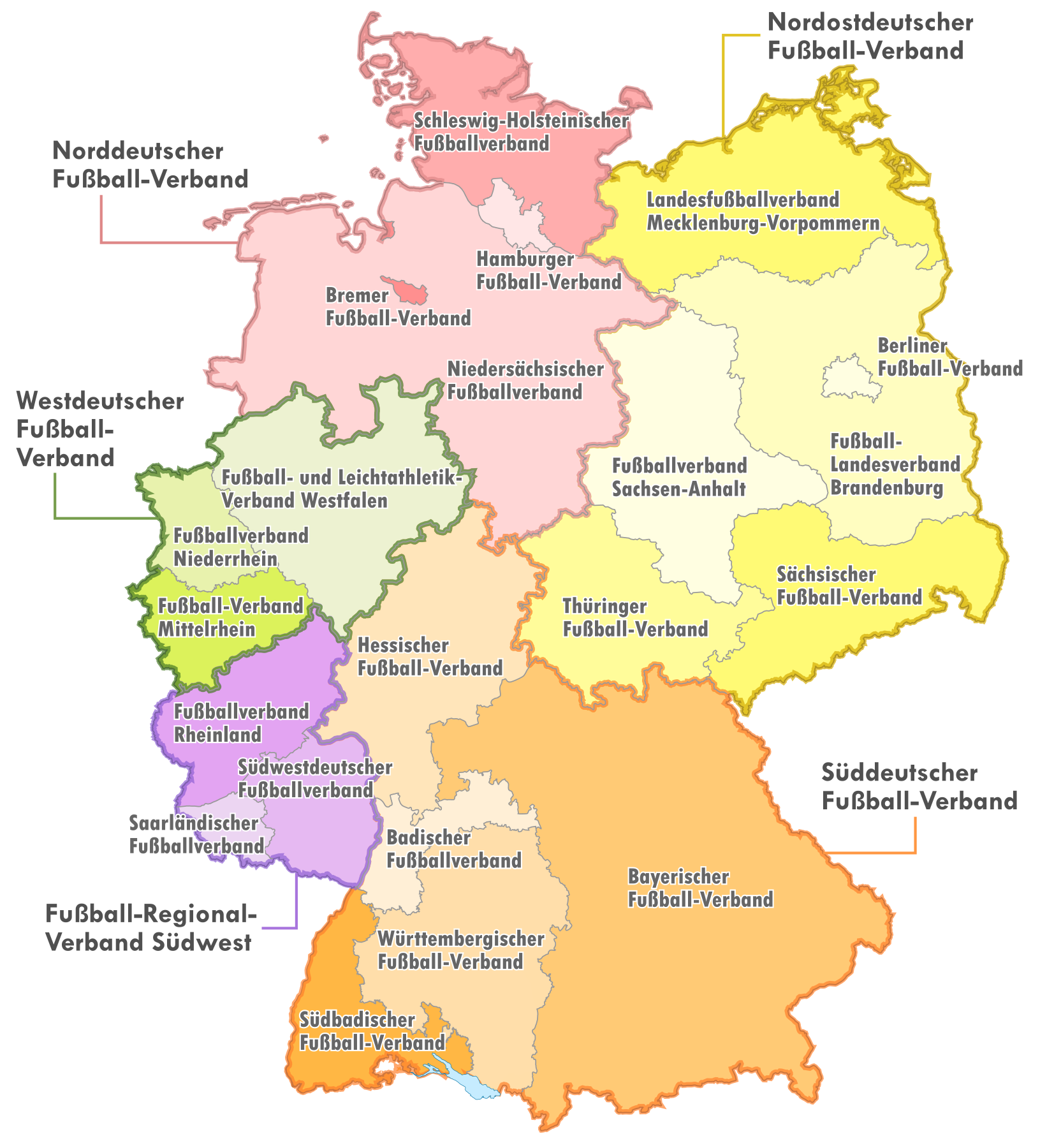
DFB, its five regional and 21 state associations

Post-Second World War Germany saw Württemberg predominantly become part of the US occupation zone, however, the southern parts were located in the French zone. As travel within the occupation zone was restricted, the reestablishing of a Southern German federation seemed initially impossible.

In September 1945, a regional football league was established, the Oberliga Süd, which was made up of 16 of the foremost football clubs of Southern Germany. The organisers of this competition had also received the permission to reestablish the SFV from the US authorities. Below the Oberliga, the not yet officially reestablished SFV decreed that Landesligas were to be established for each of the states. On 4 November 1945, the new Oberliga played its first round.

To alleviate any friction between the Southern German and the state association, the state associations became a member of the SFV but the football clubs remained members of their state associations only, not the SFV. The SFV had the responsibility to organise the Oberliga and the new 2nd Oberliga, all other leagues were part of their state associations.

The Württembergischer Fußballverband was formed on 8 July 1951 in Ulm when the Northern Württemberg and the Southern Württemberg/Hohenzollern associations merged. The northern association, in the US zone, had been formed in 1948, the southern association in the French zone in 1949. During the 1970s, Yugoslav gastarbeiters formed their own football clubs but the WFV did not allow them to compete in their league, so the Yugoslavs formed their own league, the Jugoliga.

== President ==
The WFV is led by a president elected at the annual general meeting. From 2003 to 2015 the WFV was led by Herbert Rösch. The latter will step down on 9 May 2015 and a new president will be elected at the annual general meeting of the WFV.

== Member statistics ==
In 2017, the WFV had 530,443 members, 1,762 member clubs and 12,792 teams playing in its league system, making it the fourth-largest of the 21 state associations in Germany.

== Regional team ==
The association also organizes the Württemberg regional football team which has represented Germany at four editions of the UEFA Regions' Cup.
