= Berlin Football Association =

- Formation: 11 September 1897
- Type: Football association
- Headquarters: Humboldtstraße 8a
- Location: Berlin, Germany
- Members: 150,981 (2017)
- President: Bernd Schultz
- Parent organization: German Football Association
- Website: berliner-fussball.de

The Berlin Football Association (German: Berliner Fussball-Verband, BFV) is the umbrella organization of football clubs in the German capital Berlin. The BFV was founded in 1897 and has its headquarters in Berlin. President of the BFV is Bernd Schultz.

The BFV belongs to the Northeastern German Football Association and is one of 21 state organizations of the German Football Association (German: Deutscher Fussball-Bund – DFB).

In 2017 the BFV had 150,981 members from 391 football clubs with 3,501 teams.
