= Under 15 Regionalliga Süd =

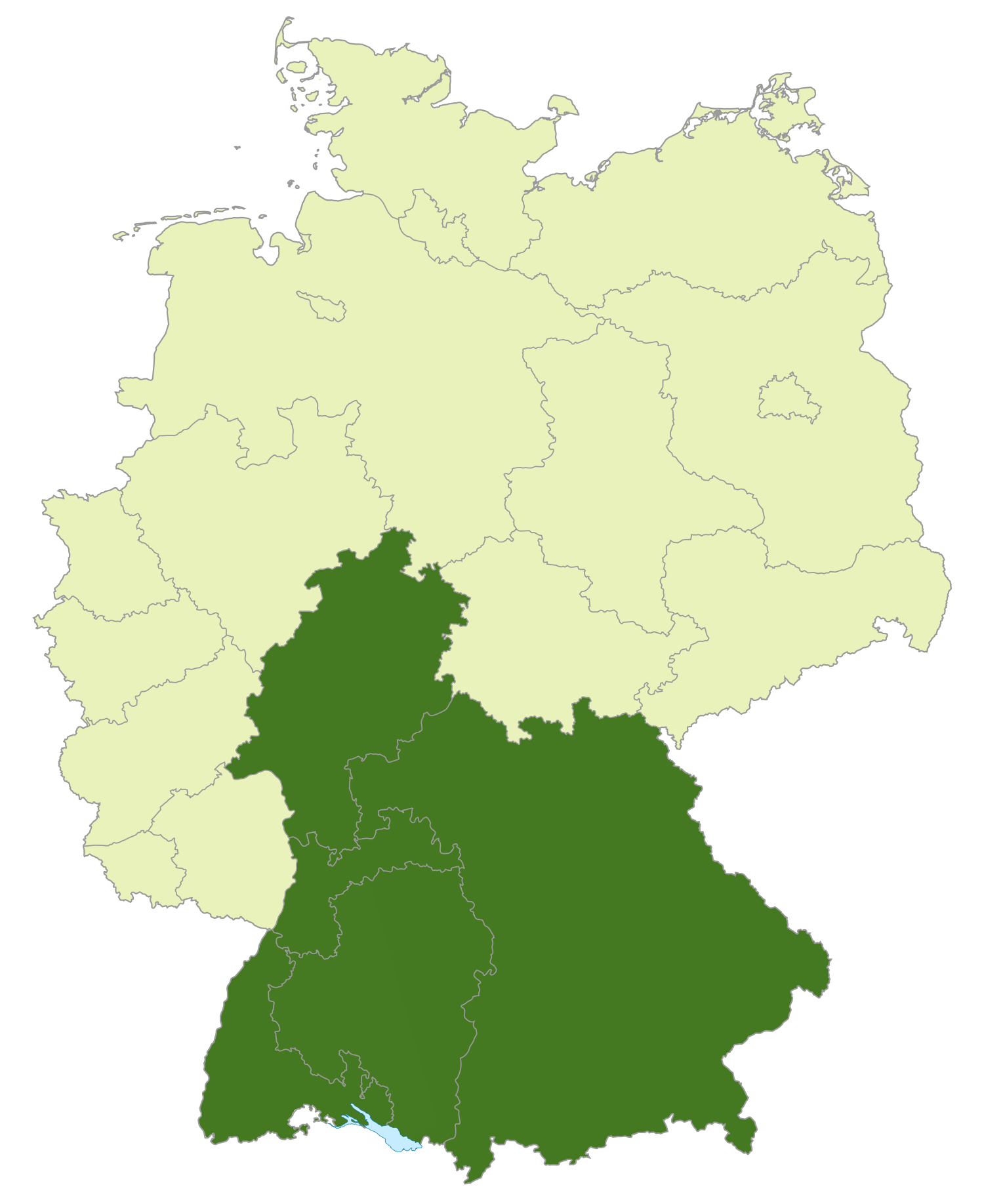
- Country: Germany
- State: Baden-Württemberg; Hesse
- Level on pyramid: Level 1
- Current champions: VfB Stuttgart (2018–19)

The Under 15 Regionalliga Süd (German: C-Jugend Regionalliga Süd) is the highest level of competition for under 15 football teams in Baden-Württemberg and Hesse and the first tier of the German football league system in Southern Germany as there is no Bundesliga or German Championship organised at this level.

The competition is organised by the Southern German football association, the SFV.

== History ==
The league was introduced in 2010 as the last of the five Regionalligas in Germany at this age level. Previous to the introduction of the Regionalliga local leagues were played in Southern Germany with a Southern German Championship contested by the best clubs at the end of the season. The league initially operated with 12 teams but was expanded to 14 at the end of the 2012–13 season.

In the 2014–15 season VfB Stuttgart won the league, remaining undefeated all season and winning 22 out of 26 games.

== Feeder leagues ==
Three clubs are relegated every season from the league, except in 2012–13 when it was only one because of the league expansion. In turn three clubs are promoted to the league every season, the champions of each of the three states or, if ineligible, the highest placed eligible team. The Regionalliga has four feeder leagues as the Bavarian league is subdivided into a northern and southern division:

- Hessenliga
- Bayernliga North
- Bayernliga South
- Oberliga Baden-Württemberg

== Champions ==
The league champions:

Season	Champions
2010–11	VfB Stuttgart
2011–12	TSG 1899 Hoffenheim
2012–13	TSG 1899 Hoffenheim
2013–14	Eintracht Frankfurt
2014–15	VfB Stuttgart
2015–16	TSG 1899 Hoffenheim
2016–17	VfB Stuttgart
2017–18	TSG 1899 Hoffenheim
2018–19	VfB Stuttgart

== League placings ==
The placings in the league:

Club	11	12	13	14	15	16	17	18	19
VfB Stuttgart	1	3	4	3	1	2	1	3	1
TSG 1899 Hoffenheim	3	1	1	4	4	1	3	1	2
Eintracht Frankfurt	2	4	2	1	2	3	4	2	3
SC Freiburg	5	7	6	10	11	9	10	5	4
SV Darmstadt 98						10	8	6	5
SV Wehen Wiesbaden			11	14				12	6
Karlsruher SC	9	10		5	10	6	7	7	7
FSV Frankfurt		11			8	5	9	4	8
TSG Wieseck	11						14	8	9
Stuttgarter Kickers		6	12		6	8	6	9	10
SV Sandhausen						13		10	11
SSV Ulm 1846 Fußball							13	11	
FC Augsburg	6	8	10	6	9	4	2		
FC Bayern Munich	7	5	3	2	3	7	5		
FC Ingolstadt 04					14		11		
Jahn Regensburg						11	12		
1. FC Nürnberg	4	2	7	8	5	12			
SpVgg Greuther Fürth	8	9	5	7	7	14			
TSV 1860 Munich	10		9	11	12				
SV Waldhof Mannheim			8	9	13				
Kickers Offenbach				12					
SpVgg Unterhaching		12		13					
OSC Vellmar	12								

1: League champions

== Top scorers ==
The league's top scorers:

Season	Player	Club	Goals
2010–11	Merphi Kwatu	FC Bayern Munich	20
2011–12	Dominik Martinović	VfB Stuttgart	36
2012–13	Meris Skenderović	TSG 1899 Hoffenheim	20
2013–14	Manuel Wintzheimer	FC Bayern Munich	26
2014–15	Tidiane M'Baye	FC Bayern Munich	19
2015–16	Kahan Kuscu	Eintracht Frankfurt	21
2016–17	David Hummel	VfB Stuttgart	35
2017–18	Džanan Mehičević	Stuttgarter Kickers	8
2018–19	Yannick Freischlad	Eintracht Frankfurt	12
