= Brandenburg State Football Association =

Brandenburg Football Association
- Formation: 28 July 1990
- Type: Football association
- Headquarters: Dresdener Straße 18
- Location: Cottbus, Germany
- Members: 100,153 (2017)
- President: Jens Kaden
- Parent organization: German Football Association
- Website: flb.de

The Brandenburg Football Association (German: Fußball-Landesverband Brandenburg, FLB), is the umbrella organization of the football clubs in the German state Brandenburg and covers the football districts of Lower Lusatia, Prignitz/Ruppin, Uckermark, Havelland, South Brandenburg, Dahme/Fläming, Oberhavel-Barnim and East Brandenburg. The FLB was founded in 1990 and has its headquarters in Cottbus. President of the association is Jens Kaden.

The FLB belongs to the Northeastern German Football Association and is one of 21 state organizations of the German Football Association (German: Deutscher Fussball-Bund - DFB).

In 2017, the FLB had 100,153 members from 674 football clubs with 3,741 teams. The FLB offers the Brandenburg Cup, which is a competition between various clubs in the state.
