= Bavarian Football Association =

Governing body of association football in Bavaria

- Formation: 1 June 1946
- Type: Football association
- Headquarters: Haus des Fußballs; Brienner Straße 50
- Location: Munich, Bavaria
- Members: 1,602,807 (2017)
- President: Rainer Koch
- Parent organization: German Football Association
- Website: www.bfv.de

The Bavarian Football Association (German: Bayerischer Fussball-Verband), the BFV, is one of 21 regional organisations of the German Football Association, the DFB, and covers the state of Bavaria. It was formed as an independent association on 4 February 1949 but its origins date back to 1945.

The Bavarian FA is also part of the Southern German Football Association, the SFV, one of five regional federations in Germany. The other members of the SFV are the football associations of Baden, Hesse, South Baden and Württemberg. It is the largest of the five regional federations and based in Munich.

In 2016, the BFV had 1,602,807 members, 4,611 member clubs and 26,440 teams playing in its league system, making it the largest of the 21 regional associations in Germany. Because of its status, Bavaria is awarded an extra entry to the first round of the German Cup.

== History ==
=== Pre-BFV history ===
Football in Southern Germany, and thereby in Bavaria was originally administrated by the Süddeutscher Fussball-Verband, which was formed on 17 October 1897 in Karlsruhe, then under the name of Verband Süddeutscher Fussball-Vereine. The new federation soon began to organise a regional football competition, the Southern German football championship, followed by a league system a few years later.

In November 1927, the federation merged with the Southern German track and field association, forming a much enlarged federation, the Süddeutscher Fussball- und Leichtathletik-Verband - SFLV.

With the rise of the Nazis to power in 1933, the federation received the order from Berlin to disband itself in March 1933. On 6 August 1933, the SFLV held its last general meeting, in Stuttgart, where the order to disband was officially carried out. The financial liquidation of the federation was completed in 1942.

=== The BFV ===
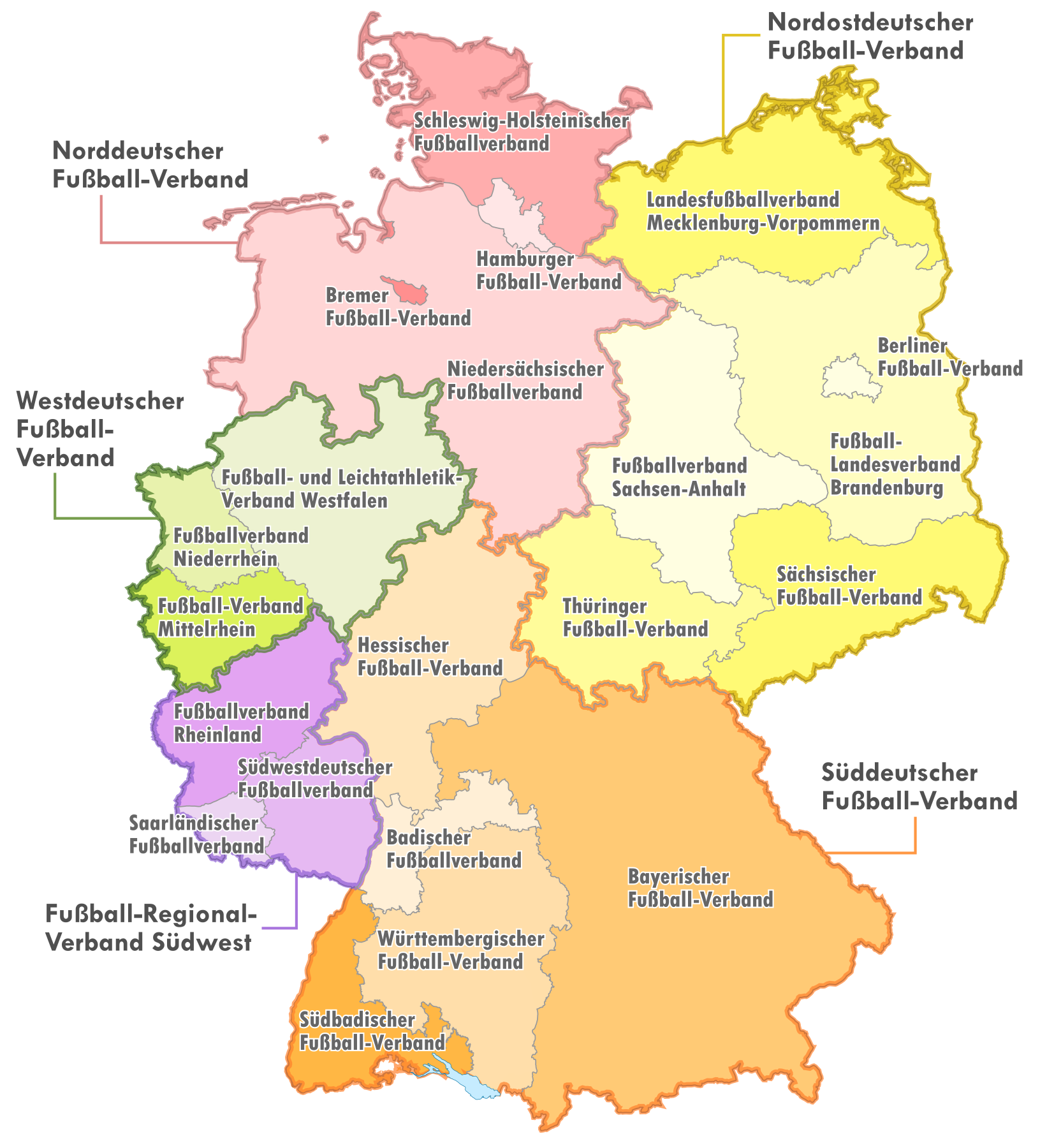
DFB, its five regional and 21 state associations

Post-Second World War Germany saw Bavaria become part of the US occupation zone. As travel within the occupation zone was restricted, the reestablishing of a Southern German federation seemed initially impossible. Instead, on 18 July 1945, a Bavarian State Sports Association. the BLSV, was established and officially sanctioned by the US authorities a year later. This new association was not exclusively popular, as it was seen by former members of the SFLV as an obstacle to reestablish the latter.

The situation soon deteriorated into conflict as, in September 1945, a regional football league was established, the Oberliga Süd, which was made up of 16 of the foremost football clubs of Southern Germany. The organisers of this competition had also received the permission to reestablish the SFV from the US authorities. Below the Oberliga, the not yet officially reestablished SFV decreed that Landesligas were to be established for each of the states.

On 4 November 1945, the new Oberliga played its first round, having forced Munich's biggest clubs, FC Bayern and TSV 1860 to break their promise to take part in a Munich football championship. As a consequence, the two clubs were expelled from the BLSV in September 1945. To alleviate the friction between the BLSV and the Bavarian football clubs, Hans Huber, later chairman of the BFV, was placed in charge of the football department of the BLSV and readmitted Bayern and 1860 to the association.

Confronted with accusations that the football department did not stand up enough to the BLSV, the former eventually took the step of establishing itself as an independent organisation and became the Bayerischer Fussball-Verband on 4 February 1945. Additionally, on 19 December 1949, the Southern German Football Federation was officially reestablished. To alleviate any friction between the Southern German and the state associations, the latter became a member of the SFV but the football clubs remained members of their state associations only, not the SFV. The SFV had the responsibility to organise the Oberliga and the new 2nd Oberliga, all other leagues were part of their state associations.

The BFV in turn was organised in seven regional federations, the Bezirke, those being Middle-, Upper- and Lower Franconia, Upper- and Lower Bavaria, Swabia and the Upper Palatinate.

== Member statistics ==
As of 2017, the BFV has 1,602,807 members, making it by far the biggest regional association in Germany, with Westphalia coming second with 946,502 members. In that year, the BFV had 4,611 member clubs and 26,440 football teams played within its league system.

== Leagues ==
The Bavarian league system consists of senior men's, women's and male and female junior leagues as well as cup competitions. It organises statewide leagues, the Bayernliga, in men's, women's, Under 19, 17 and 15 boys and Under 17 girls competitions. Below these, regional leagues are set, the Landesligas, followed by a league pyramid that extends as far as the 13th tier of the German football league system in some regions.

The Bavarian Cup is the premier cup competition in Bavaria, held in a male and female edition.

The top-level leagues in Bavaria since 2012-13 are:

Group	League	Tier
Men	Bayernliga	V
Women	Women's Bayernliga	IV
Under 19 boys	Under 19 Bayernliga	II
Under 17 boys	Under 17 Bayernliga	II
Under 17 girls	Girls Under 17 Bayernliga	I
Under 15 boys	Under 15 Bayernliga ^{1}	II
Under 15 girls	Girls Under 15 Bezirksoberliga ^{2}	I
Under 13 boys	Under 13 Bezirksoberliga	I

- ^{1} In two regional divisions.
- ^{2} Only exists in some regions.

== Exiles ==
Bavaria accommodates one club from Austria, the SV Kleinwalsertal, which plays in the B-Klasse Allgäu 8 in 2017–18.

A number of Bavarian clubs have opted to play in the league systems of neighboring states for geographical reasons. FC Bayern Alzenau plays in the league system of Hesse, formerly with Viktoria Aschaffenburg. Viktoria's senior and junior teams now play in the Bavarian league system. A number of clubs from the border region to Württemberg, along the river Iller, play in the Württemberg league system, the most successful of those being SpVgg Au/Iller, FV Illertissen and the SpVgg Lindau. Both Viktoria Aschaffenburg and FV Illertissen returned to the Bavarian league system from 2012 onwards, taking advantage of the opportunity to play in the new Regionalliga Bayern.

All up, 75 clubs from the Bavarian region of Swabia play in the Württemberg league system, 45 of those in the Donau/Iller region, the remainder spread over other border regions of the WFV. In late 2010, the idea was floated that those clubs could be forced to return to the Bavarian league system but this idea was dropped again.

== Rules ==
The rules of the game in Bavaria, the Spielordnung, has a number of special clauses that, at times, differ from the standard frame work of the DFB.

The BFV categorises players in three groups, amateurs, contracted players and licensed players. The Bavarian FA's definition of an amateur is a player who is not paid for its participation in a game and receives no more than €249.99 per month in compensations. It also sub-divides professionals in contracted players and licensed players. A contracted player is a player who is a member of a club who also receives payments in excess of €250 while a licensed player is a full professional.

The BFV clearly defines the season as starting on 1 July of a year and finishing on 30 June the following year. It prohibits matches to be played in January, unless they are held indoors.

Every club competing in the league system must have a certain number of junior teams, depending on which league they play in, with the clubs in the Landesliga and Bayernliga having to have the most, three. Every club must also provide one referee per senior team it fields.

The BFV stipulates that leagues at the fourth to sixth tier of the league system have to have a nominal strength of 18 teams, leagues below of 16 teams, also this can fluctuate with promotion and relegation. It also dictates a specific league name for every tier. Up to the Kreisklasse, the fourth-lowest tier, first and second teams can play at the same level, but not in the same league.

Unlike most other football associations in Germany, Bavaria did not use the goal difference to determine league positions if two or more teams are on equal points on a rank of importance in the final standings. Should two or more teams be on equal points when a championship, promotion or relegation rank was considered, the teams had to play deciders. However, this rule was temporarily out of force in 2011-12 because of the large number of deciders already required to determine the make up of the future league system after 2012 with its major changes. Since then the goal difference has been used on higher league levels while lower levels were given the option of select which method they wish to use.

All league champions within the Bavarian league system have the right for direct promotion. Should a club decline promotion, the right gets passed on to the next-placed team, to a maximum of the fourth placed side in the final standings.

Should a club declare insolvency during a season its first team will be automatically relegated to the next league below. Reserve teams or youth side are not affected by this but should it have a women's team in a league higher than the men's team, the women's team would be relegated instead.

Should a player compete for a professional team of a club, he or she can not be used in the reserve team for up to 10 days. This rule however does not apply for Under-23 players, which is why many reserve sides of professional clubs play as Under-23 sides.

In the Kreisligas and below, substituted players can be reused during a game. This is not possible in leagues above this level.

== Honours ==
Invitational

- (India) DCM Trophy
  - Runners-up (1): 1972
