= Hessian Football Association =

Governing body of association football in Hesse

- Hessischer Fußball-Verband
- Abbreviation: HFV
- Formation: 1952; 74 years ago
- Type: Football association
- Headquarters: Landessportbund Hessen Otto-Fleck-Schneise 4; 60528 Frankfurt/Main
- Location: Frankfurt, Hesse
- Members: 510,281 (2017)
- President: Stefan G. Reuß
- Parent organization: German Football Association
- Website: www.hfv-online.de

The Hessian Football Association (German: Hessischer Fußball-Verband), the HFV, is one of 21 state organisations of the German Football Association, the DFB, and covers the state of Hesse.

The Hessian FA is also part of the Southern German Football Association (German: Süddeutscher Fußball-Verband), the SFV, one of five regional federations in Germany. The other members of the SFV are the football associations of Baden, Bavaria, South Baden and Württemberg. The SFV is the largest of the five regional federations and based in Munich.

== History ==
=== Pre-HFV history ===
Football in Southern Germany, and thereby in Hesse was originally administrated by the Süddeutscher Fußball-Verband, which was formed on 17 October 1897 in Karlsruhe, then under the name of Verband Süddeutscher Fußball-Vereine. The new federation soon began to organise a regional football competition, the Southern German football championship, followed by a league system a few years later.

In November 1927, the federation merged with the Southern German track and field association, forming a much enlarged federation, the Süddeutscher Fußball- und Leichtathletik-Verband - SFLV.

With the rise of the Nazis to power in 1933, the federation received the order from Berlin to disband itself in March 1933. On 6 August 1933, the SFLV held its last general meeting, in Stuttgart, where the order to disband was officially carried out. The financial liquidation of the federation was completed in 1942.

=== The HFV ===
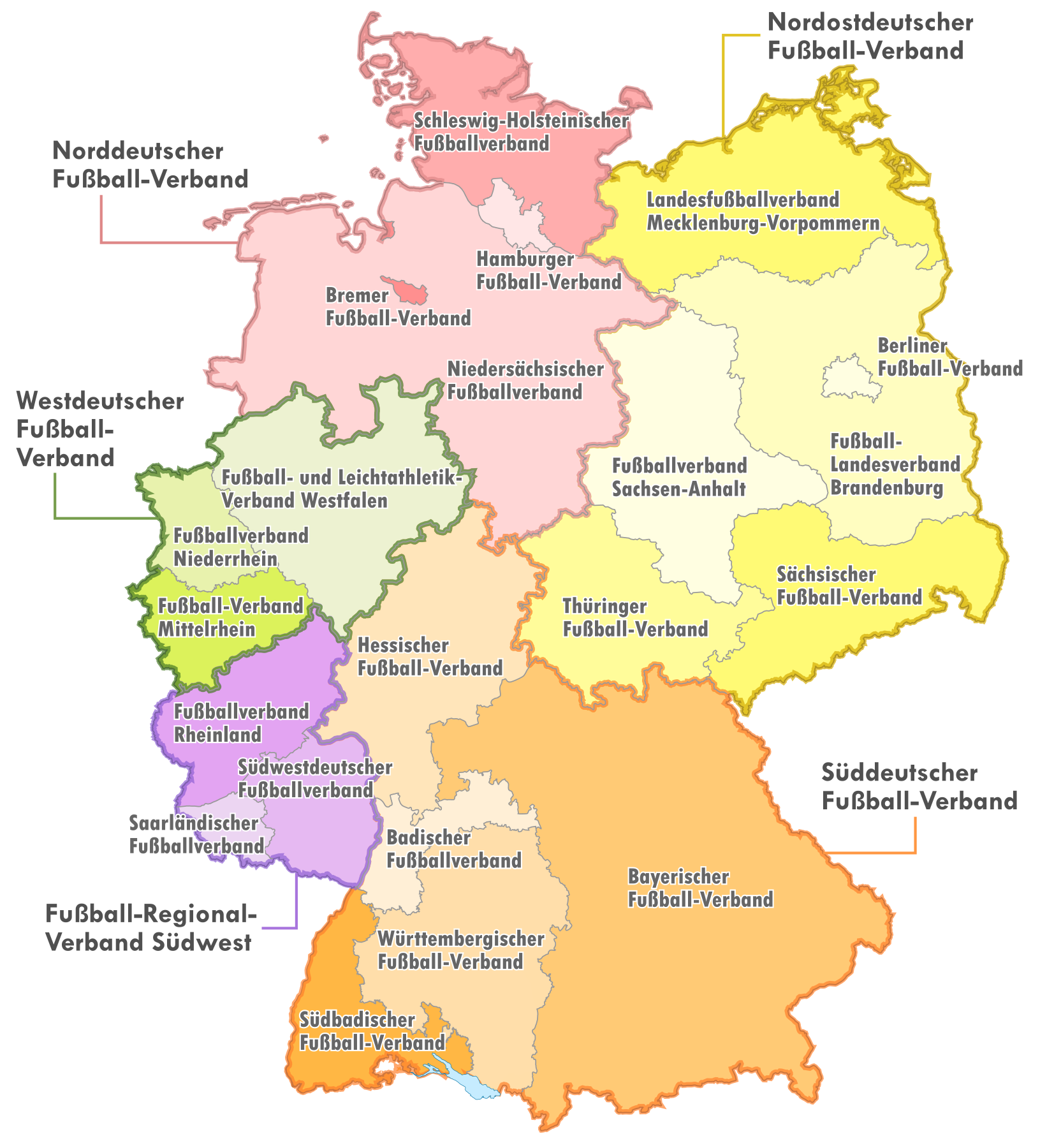
DFB, its five regional and 21 state associations

Post-Second World War Germany saw Hesse become part of the US occupation zone. As travel within the occupation zone was restricted, the reestablishing of a Southern German federation seemed initially impossible.

In September 1945, a regional football league was established, the Oberliga Süd, which was made up of 16 of the foremost football clubs of Southern Germany. The organisers of this competition had also received the permission to reestablish the SFV from the US authorities. Below the Oberliga, the not yet officially reestablished SFV decreed that Landesligas were to be established for each of the states. On 4 November 1945, the new Oberliga played its first round.

To alleviate any friction between the Southern German and the state association, the state associations became a member of the SFV but the football clubs remained members of their state associations only, not the SFV. The SFV had the responsibility to organise the Oberliga and the new 2nd Oberliga, all other leagues were part of their state associations.

The HFV itself was not officially formed until 17 June 1952. Prior to that, since February 1946, football in the state was organised by the Football Department of the State Sports Federation. From 1948, this department became known as the Hessischer Fußball-Verband, but full independence was not achieved until 1952.

== Member statistics ==
In 2017, the HFV had 510,281 members, 2,111 member clubs and 11,240 teams playing in its league system, making it the fifth-largest of the 21 state associations in Germany, behind Bavaria, Westphalia, Lower Saxony and Württemberg.
