= South Baden Football Association =

- Südbadischer Fußball-Verband
- Abbreviation: SBFV
- Formation: 1948
- Type: Football association
- Location: Freiburg, Baden-Württemberg
- Members: 272,181 (2017)
- President: Thomas Schmidt
- Parent organization: German Football Association
- Website: www.sbfv.de

The South Baden Football Association (German: Südbadischer Fußball-Verband), the SBFV, is one of 21 state organisations of the German Football Association, the DFB, and covers the south-western part of the state of Baden-Württemberg.

The South Baden FA is also part of the Southern German Football Association, the SFV, one of five regional federations in Germany. The other members of the SFV are the football associations of Hesse, Bavaria, Württemberg and Baden. The SFV is the largest of the five regional federations and based in Munich.

In 2017, the SBFV had 272,181 members, 715 member clubs and 5,715 teams playing in its league system, making it the eight-largest of the 21 state associations in Germany.

== History ==
=== Pre-SBFV history ===
Football in Southern Germany, and thereby in Baden was originally administrated by the Süddeutscher Fussball-Verband, which was formed on 17 October 1897 in Karlsruhe, then under the name of Verband Süddeutscher Fussball-Vereine. The new federation soon began to organise a regional football competition, the Southern German football championship, followed by a league system a few years later.

In November 1927, the federation merged with the Southern German track and field association, forming a much enlarged federation, the Süddeutscher Fussball- und Leichtathletik-Verband - SFLV.

With the rise of the Nazis to power in 1933, the federation received the order from Berlin to disband itself in March 1933. On 6 August 1933, the SFLV held its last general meeting, in Stuttgart, where the order to disband was officially carried out. The financial liquidation of the federation was completed in 1942.

=== The SBFV ===
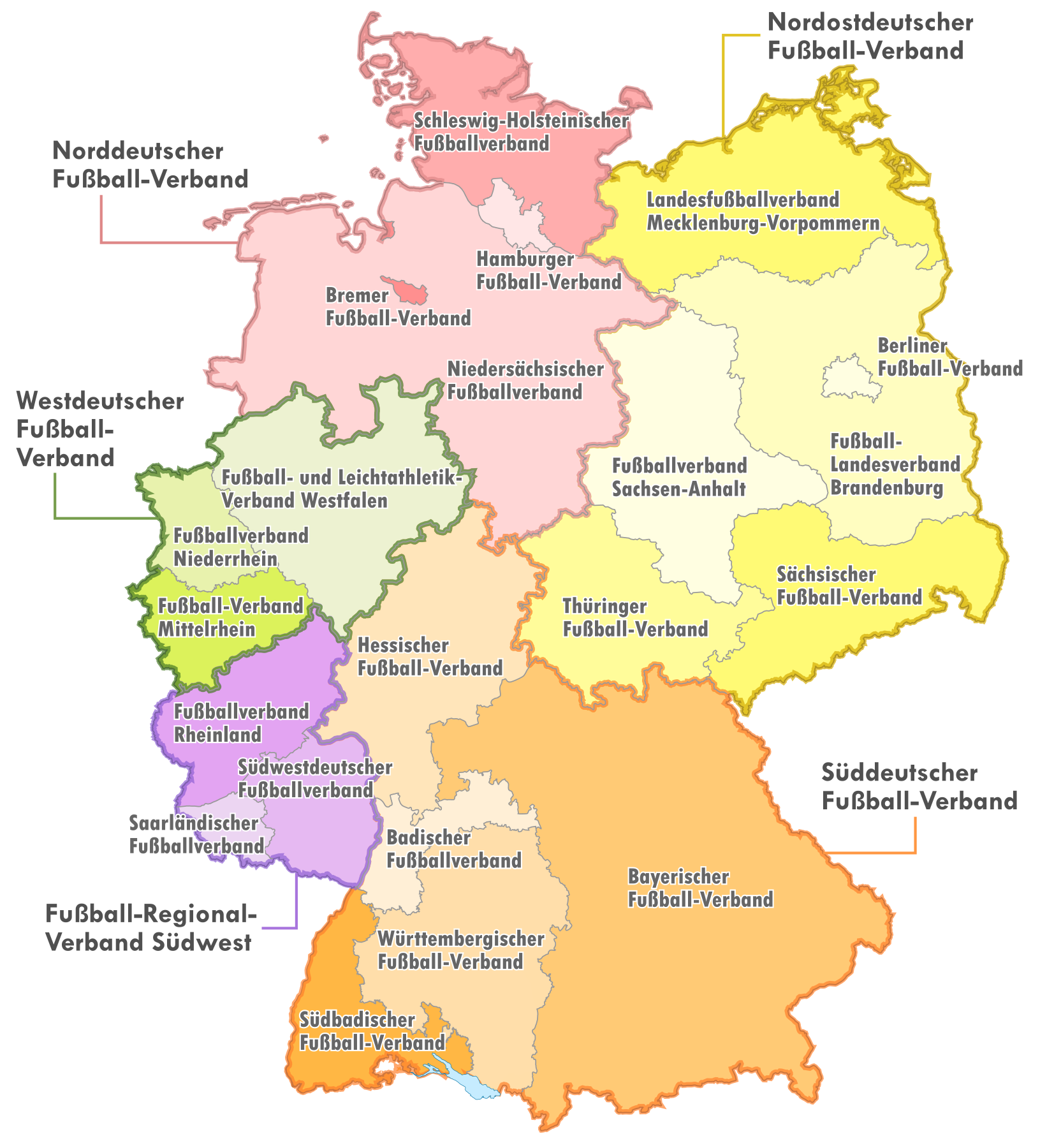
DFB, its five regional and 21 state associations

Former SBFV logo

Post-Second World War Germany saw South Baden become part of the French occupation zone. As travel within the occupation zone was restricted, the reestablishing of a Southern German federation seemed initially impossible.

In September 1945, a regional football league was established, the Oberliga Süd, which was made up of 16 of the foremost football clubs of Southern Germany. The organisers of this competition had also received the permission to reestablish the SFV from the US authorities. Below the Oberliga, the not yet officially reestablished SFV decreed that Landesligas were to be established for each of the states. On 4 November 1945, the new Oberliga played its first round. The clubs from South Baden however were outside this framework, playing in their own league system instead and then playing a French zone championship with the champions from the northern half of the occupation zone, from what was to become the state of Rhineland-Palatinate.

The Südbadischer Fußball-Verband was formed on 12 December 1948 in Freiburg im Breisgau in a meeting of 293 clubs.

To alleviate any friction between the Southern German and the state association, the state associations became a member of the SFV but the football clubs remained members of their state associations only, not the SFV. The SFV had the responsibility to organise the Oberliga and the new 2nd Oberliga, all other leagues were part of their state associations.

In 1950, the clubs from South Baden returned to the Southern German federation, ending the era of the French Zone championship. The best clubs from the region, SSV Reutlingen and FC Singen 04, were grupped in the Oberliga Süd while Freiburger FC and FC Konstanz entered the new second division 2. Oberliga Süd. Reutlingen is now not part of the SBFV anymore, having joined the Württemberg FA instead. In 1951 merger talks were held with the Baden FA to have one federation for the whole state of Baden and terms were agreed on but the merger was never implemented and the separation of Baden football continues to this day.

In 1978, the association, like Württemberg and Baden, implemented a reform of its league system. The historical league system, with the Amateurliga Südbaden as the top league, the third division, followed by the 2nd Amateurliga, the A-Klasse, B-Klasse and C-Klasse was replaced with the Verbandsliga Südbaden, now the fourth division, followed by the Landesliga, Bezirksliga, Kreisliga and Kreisliga B.

== Member statistics ==
As of 2017, the SBFV has 272,181 members, 715 member clubs and 5,715 football teams played within its league system.
