= Saarland Football Association =

Regional football association in Saarland, Germany

DFB
- Founded: 25 July 1948; 76 years ago
- Headquarters: Hermann-Neuberger-Sportschule
- Location: Saarbrücken, Saarland
- Membership: 97,954 (2017)
- DFB affiliation: 1956
- FRVS affiliation: 1956
- FIFA affiliation: 1950–1956
- UEFA affiliation: 1954–1956
- President: Franz Josef Schumann
- Website: Official website

The Saarland Football Association (German: Saarländischer Fußballverband; SFV) is one of 21 state organisations of the German Football Association, the DFB, and covers the state of Saarland.

The SFV is also part of the Southwestern Regional Football Association (FRVS), one of five regional federations in Germany. The other member of the regional association are the Southwest German Football Association and the Rhineland Football Association.

In 2017, the SFV had 97,954 members, 370 member clubs and 2,276 teams playing in its league system.

== History ==
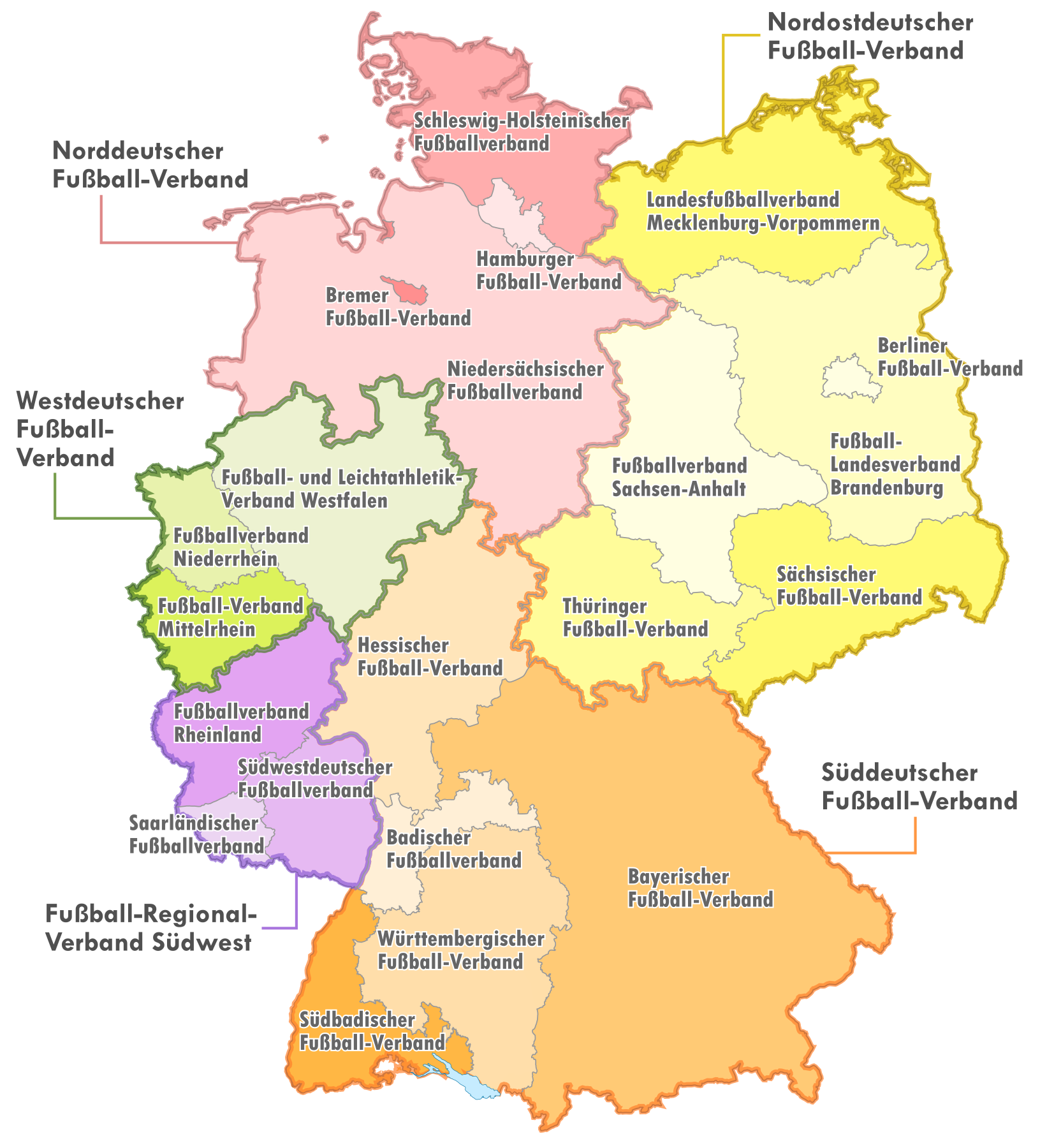
DFB, its five regional and 21 state associations

Formed in Sulzbach on 25 July 1948, in what was then the Saar Protectorate, the Saarländischer Fußball Bund (SFB) became the organising body of football in the region, when Saar was split from the rest of occupied Germany. The SFB rejected membership in the French Football Federation on 17 July 1949 when 67 per cent of the delegates of the association voted against it. Instead the SFB was admitted as a member of FIFA in June 1950. From 1950 onwards Hermann Neuberger, later to become president of the German Football Association, the DFB, led the SFB and negotiated the admission of the latter to FIFA. The Saarland national football team took part in international competitions, among them the qualifying rounds to the 1954 FIFA World Cup where it played against West Germany. In 1956, following the reunification of the protectorate with West Germany, the SFB became part of the DFB again and was renamed to Saarländischer Fußball-Verband.
