= Baden Football Association =

- Badischer Fußballverband
- Abbreviation: bfv
- Formation: 1946
- Type: Football association
- Headquarters: Sportschule Schöneck Sepp-Herberger-Weg 2
- Location: Karlsruhe, Baden-Württemberg
- Members: 198,187 (2017)
- President: Ronny Zimmermann
- Parent organization: German Football Association
- Website: www.badfv.de

The Baden Football Association (German: Badischer Fußballverband), the bfv, is one of 21 state organisations of the German Football Association, the DFB, and covers the north of Baden, the north-western part of the state of Baden-Württemberg.

The Baden FA is also part of the Southern German Football Association, the SFV, one of five regional federations in Germany. The other members of the SFV are the football associations of Hesse, Bavaria, South Baden and Württemberg. The SFV is the largest of the five regional federations and based in Munich.

== History ==
=== Pre-BFV history ===
Football in Southern Germany, and thereby in Baden was originally administrated by the Süddeutscher Fußball-Verband, which was formed on 17 October 1897 in Karlsruhe, then under the name of Verband Süddeutscher Fußball-Vereine. The new federation soon began to organise a regional football competition, the Southern German football championship, followed by a league system a few years later.

In November 1927, the federation merged with the Southern German track and field association, forming a much enlarged federation, the Süddeutscher Fußball- und Leichtathletik-Verband - SFLV.

With the rise of the Nazis to power in 1933, the federation received the order from Berlin to disband itself in March 1933. On 6 August 1933, the SFLV held its last general meeting, in Stuttgart, where the order to disband was officially carried out. The financial liquidation of the federation was completed in 1942.

=== The BFV ===
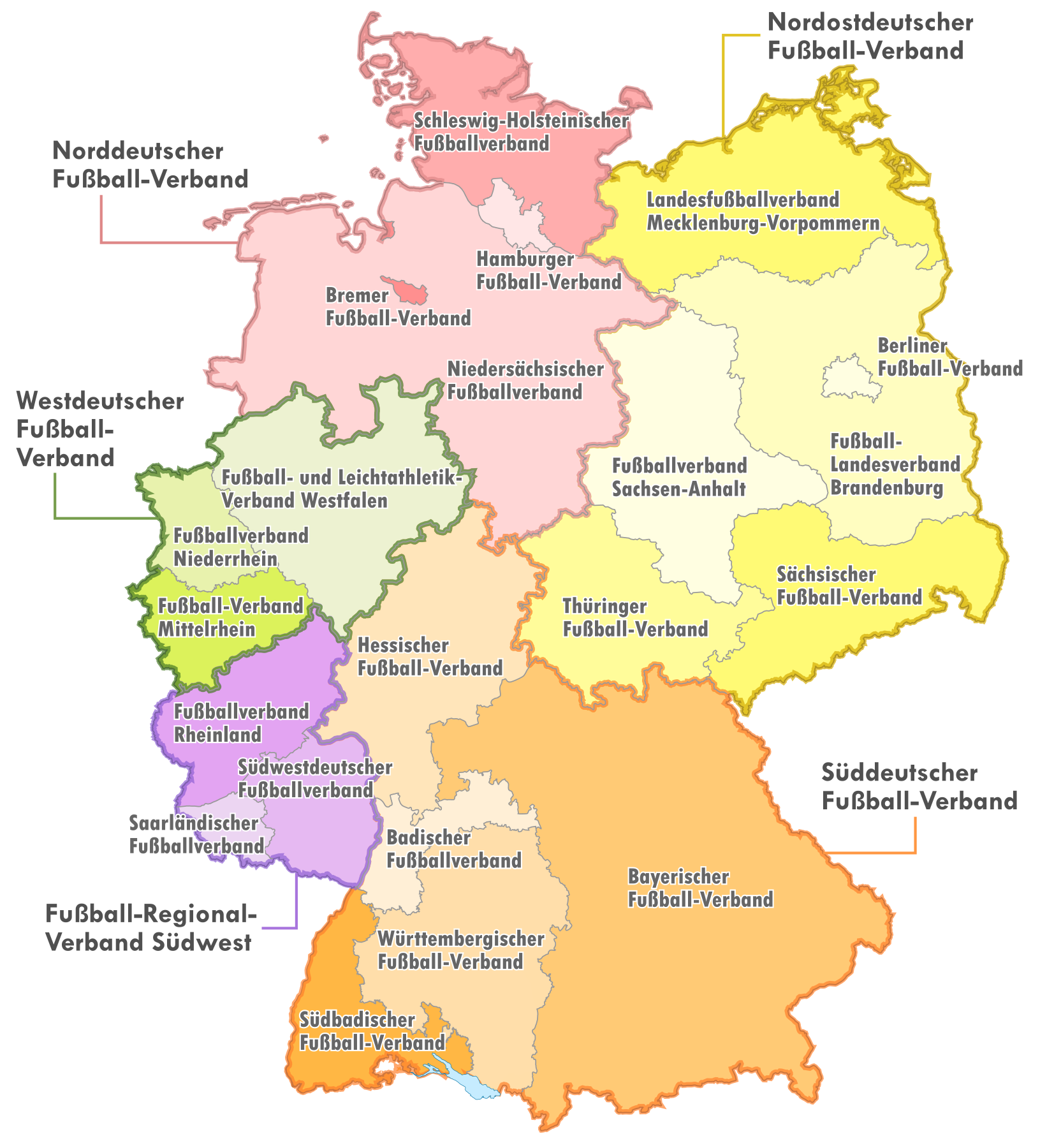
DFB, its five regional and 21 state associations

Post-Second World War Germany saw Baden become part of the US occupation zone. As travel within the occupation zone was restricted, the reestablishment of a Southern German federation seemed initially impossible.

In September 1945, a regional football league was established, the Oberliga Süd, which was made up of 16 of the foremost football clubs of Southern Germany. The organisers of this competition had also received the permission to reestablish the SFV from the US authorities. Below the Oberliga, the not yet officially reestablished SFV decreed that Landesligas were to be established for each of the states. On 4 November 1945, the new Oberliga played its first round.

To alleviate any friction between the Southern German and the state association, the state associations became a member of the SFV but the football clubs remained members of their state associations only, not the SFV. The SFV had the responsibility to organise the Oberliga and the new 2nd Oberliga, all other leagues were part of their state associations.

The Badischer Fußball-Verband was formed on 7 July 1946 in Eppelheim.

== Member statistics ==
In 2017, the BFV had 198,187 members, 610 member clubs and 4,742 teams playing in its league system.
