= Southwest German Football Association =

South West German Football Association
- Südwestdeutscher Fußballverband
- Abbreviation: SWFV
- Formation: 23 July 1949
- Type: Football association
- Headquarters: Villastraße 63a
- Location: Edenkoben, Rhineland-Palatinate
- Members: 234,322 (2017)
- President: Hans-Dieter Drewitz
- Parent organization: German Football Association
- Website: www.swfv.de

The South West German Football Association (German: Südwestdeutscher Fußballverband), the SWFV, is one of 21 state organisations of the German Football Association, the DFB, and covers the southern part of the state of Rhineland-Palatinate.

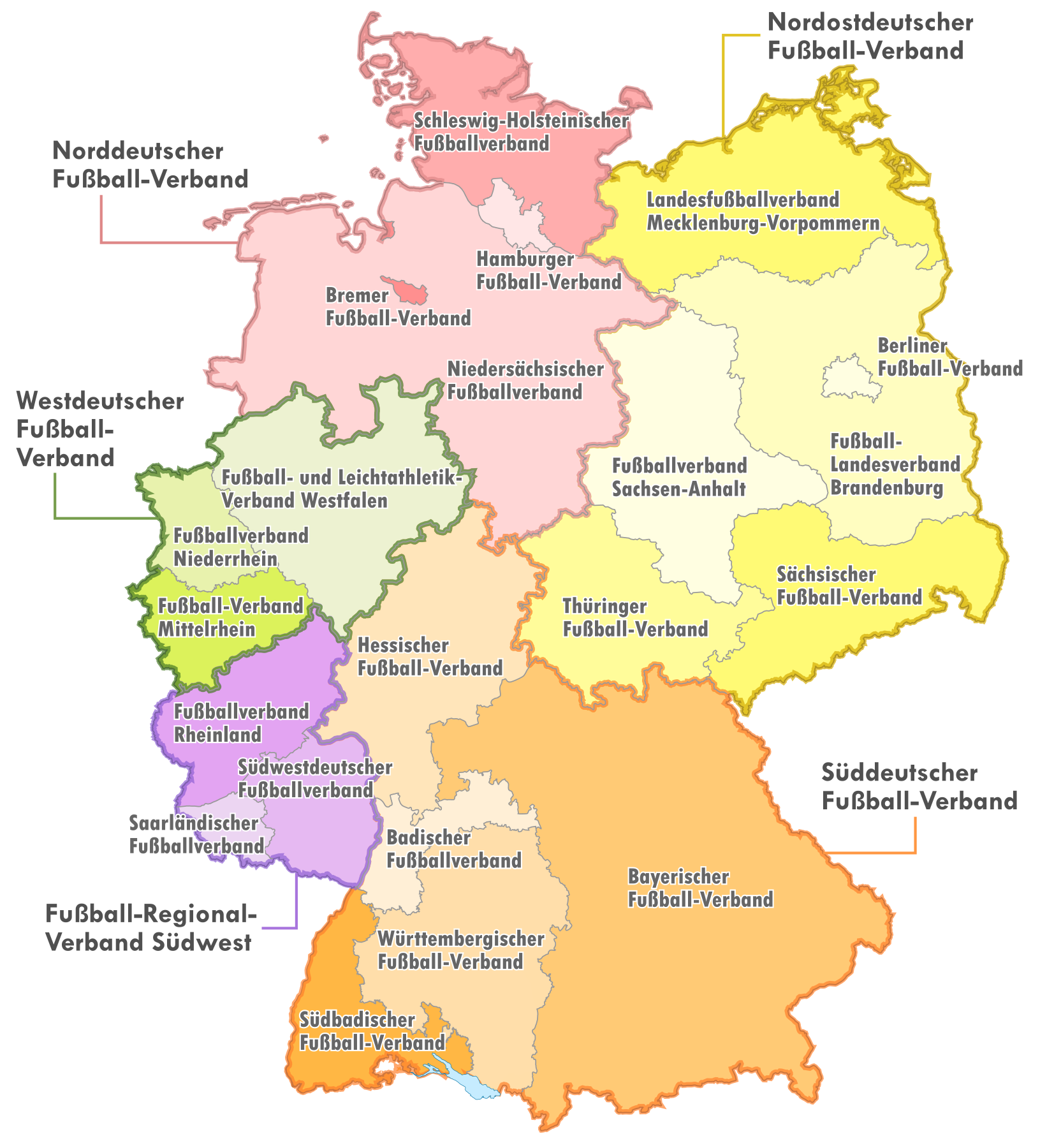
DFB, its five regional and 21 state associations

The SWFV is also part of the Southwestern Regional Football Association, one of five regional federations in Germany. The other member of the regional association are the Rhineland Football Association and the Saarland Football Association.

In 2017, the SWFV had 234,322 members, 1,036 member clubs and 5,371 teams playing in its league system.
