= 2009–10 Regionalliga =

2nd season of the Regionalliga

Regionalliga
- Season: 2009–10
- Champions: SV Babelsberg 03 (N); 1. FC Saarbrücken (W); VfR Aalen (S)
- Relegated: F.C. Hansa Rostock II; Tennis Borussia Berlin; FC St. Pauli II; Goslarer SC 08; Rot-Weiss Essen; Bonner SC; Waldhof Mannheim; SSV Reutlingen; 1. FC Eintracht Bamberg; FC Bayern Alzenau

The 2009–10 Regionalliga season was the sixteenth since its re-establishment after German reunification and the second as a fourth-level league within the German football league system. It was contested in three divisions with eighteen teams each. The competition began on 7 August 2008 with the first matches of each division and ended on 29 May 2010.

== Team changes from 2008–09 ==
=== Movement between 3. Liga and Regionalliga ===
The champions of the three 2008–09 Regionalliga divisions were promoted to the 2009–10 3. Liga. These were Holstein Kiel (North), Borussia Dortmund II (West) and 1. FC Heidenheim 1846 (South).

VfR Aalen and Stuttgarter Kickers were relegated from the 2008–09 3. Liga after finishing the season in the bottom two places. 18th-placed Wacker Burghausen were eventually spared from relegation after 5th-placed Kickers Emden voluntarily retracted their application for a license because of financial issues. Since Emden did not apply for a Regionalliga license, they were eventually moved to the fifth-tier Oberliga Niedersachsen.

=== Movement between Regionalliga and fifth-level leagues ===
Altona 93, Sachsen Leipzig, Energie Cottbus II (all North), BV Cloppenburg, 1. FC Kleve (both West), TSV Großbardorf and SpVgg Unterhaching II (both South) were relegated at the end of the 2008–09 season. Furthermore, FSV Oggersheim (West) and Viktoria Aschaffenburg (South) withdrew from the league due to financial issues.

The relegated teams were replaced by teams from the fifth-level leagues of the German league pyramid and allocated to one of the three divisions. SC Goslar 08 as winners of a round between the champions of the fifth-level leagues on the territory of the former Oberliga Nord, Tennis Borussia Berlin as NOFV-Oberliga Nord champions and ZFC Meuselwitz as winners of the NOFV-Oberliga Süd joined the Northern division. NRW-Liga champions Bonner SC and runners-up Fortuna Düsseldorf II, along with Oberliga Südwest champions 1. FC Saarbrücken were included to the Western division. Finally, SG Sonnenhof Großaspach as winners of the Oberliga Baden-Württemberg, SpVgg Weiden as Bayernliga champions and FC Bayern Alzenau as Hessenliga runners-up were added to the Southern division; Alzenau were granted promotion because Hessenliga champions SC Waldgirmes were not able to meet the necessary licensing criteria.

=== Movement between divisions ===
In order to achieve a size of eighteen teams for each division, Waldhof Mannheim were moved from the Southern to the Western division for this season.

== Regionalliga Nord ==
=== League table ===
Pos	Team	Pld	W	D	L	GF	GA	GD	Pts	Promotion or relegation
1	SV Babelsberg 03 (C, P)	34	23	8	3	54	18	+36	77	Promotion to 3. Liga
2	VfL Wolfsburg II	34	21	7	6	60	20	+40	70	
3	Chemnitzer FC	34	18	7	9	58	34	+24	61	
4	Hallescher FC	34	14	14	6	47	25	+22	56	
5	Hamburger SV II	34	15	10	9	45	34	+11	55	
6	1. FC Magdeburg	34	14	9	11	57	38	+19	51	
7	VFC Plauen	34	14	8	12	49	39	+10	50	
8	Hannover 96 II	34	13	10	11	62	41	+21	49	
9	VfB Lübeck	34	14	7	13	47	48	−1	49	
10	ZFC Meuselwitz	34	10	13	11	40	50	−10	43	
11	Hertha BSC II	34	11	9	14	57	55	+2	42	
12	F.C. Hansa Rostock II (R)	34	11	7	16	36	60	−24	40	Relegation to Oberliga (Note: F.C. Hansa Rostock decided to withdraw from the Regionalliga, citing the high cost.)
13	Türkiyemspor Berlin	34	10	9	15	51	64	−13	39	
14	SV Wilhelmshaven	34	10	9	15	45	59	−14	39	
15	Tennis Borussia Berlin (R)	34	8	10	16	33	55	−22	34	Relegation to Oberliga (Note: Tennis Borussia Berlin filed for administration on 11 May 2010 and voluntarily withdrew from the league after the end of the season.)
16	FC Oberneuland	34	9	6	19	37	71	−34	33	
17	FC St. Pauli II (R)	34	7	9	18	34	67	−33	30	Relegation to Oberliga
18	Goslarer SC 08 (R)	34	4	8	22	33	67	−34	20	Relegation to Oberliga

Source: kicker.de
Rules for classification: 1) points; 2) goal difference; 3) number of goals scored.
(C) Champions; (P) Promoted; (R) Relegated

=== Top goalscorers ===
Final standings; Source: kicker

29 goals

- (Germany) Daniel Frahn (SV Babelsberg 03)

19 goals

- (Germany) Mike Könnecke (VfL Wolfsburg II)

16 goals

- (Germany) Lars Fuchs (1. FC Magdeburg)

15 goals

- (Serbia) Radovan Vujanovic (1. FC Magdeburg)

14 goals

- (Germany) Kai Zimmermann (VFC Plauen)

13 goals

- (Poland) Rafael Kazior (Hamburger SV II)
- (Germany) Jaroslaw Lindner (Hannover 96 II)
- (Germany) Andreas Richter (Chemnitzer FC)
- (Germany) Stefan Winkel (FC St. Pauli II)

12 goals

- (Germany) Sebastian Gasch (ZFC Meuselwitz)
- (Germany) David Jansen (Chemnitzer FC)
- (Germany) Stefan Richter (VfB Lübeck)

== Regionalliga West ==
=== League table ===
Pos	Team	Pld	W	D	L	GF	GA	GD	Pts	Promotion or relegation
1	1. FC Saarbrücken (C, P)	34	20	9	5	53	33	+20	69	Promotion to 3. Liga
2	Sportfreunde Lotte	34	17	10	7	48	31	+17	61	
3	VfL Bochum II	34	16	9	9	50	32	+18	57	
4	1. FC Köln II	34	15	10	9	50	37	+13	55	
5	Rot-Weiss Essen (R)	34	14	10	10	44	32	+12	52	Relegation to Oberliga (Note: Rot-Weiss Essen were not granted a license for the new season.)
6	Preußen Münster	34	14	9	11	47	37	+10	51	
7	SV 07 Elversberg	34	14	8	12	41	34	+7	50	
8	1. FC Kaiserslautern II	34	14	7	13	43	37	+6	49	
9	SC Verl	34	12	11	11	41	41	0	47	
10	Bonner SC (R)	34	10	13	11	48	45	+3	43	Relegation to Oberliga (Note: Bonner SC were not granted a license for the new season and relegated to the NRW-Liga. However, the club was not permitted to compete in the league in 2010–11 and instead entered the tier-seven Landesliga Mittelrhein 1 for 2011–12.)
11	Fortuna Düsseldorf II	34	11	8	15	35	51	−16	41	
12	FC Schalke 04 II	34	11	7	16	42	43	−1	40	
13	Bayer Leverkusen II	34	9	13	12	38	45	−7	40	
14	Waldhof Mannheim (R)	34	10	10	14	36	43	−7	40	Relegation to Oberliga (Note: Waldhof Mannheim were not granted a license for the new season.)
15	1. FSV Mainz 05 II	34	10	10	14	37	45	−8	40	
16	Borussia Mönchengladbach II	34	11	7	16	37	53	−16	40	
17	Wormatia Worms	34	7	9	18	35	58	−23	30	
18	Eintracht Trier	34	7	8	19	33	61	−28	29	

Source: kicker
Rules for classification: 1) points; 2) goal difference; 3) number of goals scored.
(C) Champions; (P) Promoted; (R) Relegated

=== Top goalscorers ===
Final standings; Source: kicker

16 goals

- (Germany) Ercan Aydogmus (Bonner SC)
- (Germany) Christian Knappmann (SC Verl)

14 goals

- (Germany) Mirkan Aydın (VfL Bochum II)
- (Germany) Sascha Mölders (Rot-Weiss Essen)

11 goals

- (Germany) Wojciech Pollok (Preußen Münster)
- (Germany) Daniel Reule (Waldhof Mannheim)
- (Germany) Manuel Zeitz (1. FC Saarbrücken)

10 goals

- (Germany) Christian Erwig (FC Schalke 04 II
- (Germany) Marcus Fischer (Sportfreunde Lotte)
- (Germany) Mario Klinger (1. FC Kaiserslautern II)

== Regionalliga Süd ==
=== League table ===
Pos	Team	Pld	W	D	L	GF	GA	GD	Pts	Promotion or relegation
1	VfR Aalen (C, P)	34	22	8	4	51	19	+32	74	Promotion to 3. Liga
2	1. FC Nürnberg II	34	18	9	7	55	30	+25	63	
3	SC Freiburg II	34	17	10	7	63	34	+29	61	
4	Hessen Kassel	34	15	14	5	63	41	+22	59	
5	Karlsruher SC II	34	15	7	12	50	51	−1	52	
6	SSV Ulm 1846	34	13	12	9	52	45	+7	51	
7	TSV 1860 München II	34	13	10	11	51	39	+12	49	
8	Eintracht Frankfurt II	34	12	12	10	57	41	+16	48	
9	Stuttgarter Kickers	34	11	15	8	43	39	+4	48	
10	SpVgg Weiden	34	15	3	16	57	67	−10	48	
11	SpVgg Greuther Fürth II	34	14	5	15	44	58	−14	47	
12	SG Sonnenhof Großaspach	34	13	7	14	53	44	+9	46	
13	SC Pfullendorf	34	10	11	13	39	41	−2	41	
14	SSV Reutlingen (R)	34	11	7	16	43	56	−13	40	Relegation to Oberliga (Note: Reutlingen filed for administration on 23 March 2010 and voluntarily withdrew from the league after the end of the season.)
15	SV Darmstadt 98	34	8	10	16	39	49	−10	34	
16	SV Wehen Wiesbaden II	34	7	8	19	32	56	−24	29	
17	1. FC Eintracht Bamberg (R)	34	6	10	18	40	76	−36	28	Relegation to Oberliga (Note: Eintracht Bamberg filed for administration on 11 May 2010 and voluntarily withdrew from the league after the end of the season.)
18	FC Bayern Alzenau (R)	34	5	4	25	23	69	−46	19	Relegation to Oberliga

Source: kicker
Rules for classification: 1) points; 2) goal difference; 3) number of goals scored.
(C) Champions; (P) Promoted; (R) Relegated

=== Top goalscorers ===
Final standings; Source: kicker

19 goals

- (Albania) Abedin Krasniqi (SG Sonnenhof Großaspach)
- (Netherlands) Mijo Tunjic (Stuttgarter Kickers)

18 goals

- (Germany) Martin Hess (Eintracht Frankfurt II)

16 goals

- (Germany) Peter Heyer (1. FC Eintracht Bamberg)

15 goals

- (Turkey) Ahmet Kulabas (1. FC Nuremberg II)

14 goals

- (Germany) Yannick Kakoko (SpVgg Greuther Fürth II)

13 goals

- (Germany) Daniel Caligiuri (SC Freiburg II)
- (Germany) Michael Schürg (SSV Ulm 1846)

12 goals

- (Albania) Alban Meha (SSV Reutlingen)
- (Germany) Mathias Fetsch (TSV 1860 München II)
