= Regionalliga West =

German professional football division

- Organising body: Western German Football Association
- Founded: 2008
- Country: Germany
- State: North Rhine-Westphalia
- Number of clubs: 18
- Level on pyramid: Level 4
- Promotion to: 3. Liga
- Relegation to: Oberliga Niederrhein; Oberliga Mittelrhein; Oberliga Westfalen
- Domestic cups: DFB-Pokal; Westphalian Cup; Middle Rhine Cup; Lower Rhine Cup
- Current champions: Fortuna Köln (2025–26 Regionalliga West)
- Current: 2026–27 Regionalliga West

The Regionalliga West is a German professional football division administered by the Western German Football Association based in Duisburg. It is one of the five German regional football associations. Being the single flight of the Western German state association, the Regionalliga is currently a level 4 division of the German football league system. It is one of five leagues at this level, together with the Regionalliga Bayern, Regionalliga Nordost, Regionalliga Nord and the Regionalliga Südwest.

== League history ==
=== Formation ===
The league came into existence in August 2008 and was formed from the five Regionalliga clubs in its region which did not achieve admittance to the new 3rd Liga and thirteen Oberliga clubs. The number of clubs in the new league was set at eighteen. Along with the formation of this league there was a merger of the Oberligas below it, with Nordrhein and Westfalen forming the new NRW-Liga, while the Oberliga Südwest remained independent.

With the inception of the new Regionalliga West in 2008, there were now three Regionalligas which form the fourth tier of the German football league system, these were:

- Regionalliga Nord
- Regionalliga Süd
- Regionalliga West

The league covered the same region, as the now defunct Regionalliga West/Südwest did from 1994 to 2000. It also shares its name with the "old" Regionalliga West, which operated from 1963 to 1974, but this league only covered the state of North Rhine-Westphalia.

In 2008–09, with BV Cloppenburg, it included a club from Lower Saxony, while in 2009–10, with Waldhof Mannheim, a club from Baden-Württemberg played in the league. This moving-around of clubs was done to balance out the three Regionalligas in numbers. In 2010–11, in turn, Wormatia Worms, a club nominally belonging to the West, played in the South.

=== 2008–09 season ===
In its first season, the league was won by the reserve team of Borussia Dortmund, which finished three points ahead of the reserve side of the 1. FC Kaiserslautern. The best non-reserve side in the league was the Preußen Münster, finishing fourth, 15 points clear of the champion. At the bottom of the table, 1. FC Kleve and BV Cloppenburg suffered relegation, while 16th placed Wormatia Worms was spared because FSV Oggersheim, in 12th place, did not apply for a licence for the next season. The league had an average number of 1,372 spectators by game, with Rot-Weiss Essen with 7,077 per game by far the best supported club in the league. Second in this ranking was Preußen Münster with 3,649 spectators per game while the reserve side of Bayer Leverkusen came last in this ranking, attracting only 247 spectators per home game.

Sascha Mölders of Rot-Weiss Essen was by far the best scorer in the league scoring 28 times during the season, nine times more than the second-best, Christopher Kullmann.

The reserve team of Fortuna Düsseldorf, 1. FC Saarbrücken and Bonner SC were promoted to the league for the following season, while Waldhof Mannheim crossed over from the southern division to the west.

=== 2009–10 season ===
The second edition of the competition was won by the 1. FC Saarbrücken, a club freshly promoted from the Oberliga who had played in the Bundesliga in the past but fallen down the ranks in the league system. 1. FCS beat Sportfreunde Lotte by eight points to the top spot. At the bottom end, Eintracht Trier and Wormatia Worms, two clubs from Rhineland-Palatinate, were in 17th and 18th spot with a clear gap to a non-relegation rank, while 16th placed Borussia Mönchengladbach reserves was on equal points with no less than four other clubs. All three however were spared from relegation.

The top goal scorers in the second season of the league were Ercan Aydogmus and Christian Knappmann, having both scored 16 goals each.

At the end of the 2009–10 season, Rot-Weiss Essen, Waldhof Mannheim and Bonner SC were all refused a Regionalliga licence and relegated. This meant, the three last-placed teams in the league that season were after all reprieved and not relegated. For Rot-Weiss Essen this was especially bitter, having been the best-supported club in the league for the second year running, with 5,955 spectators per home game. The gap to the second best supported team however, the 1. FC Saarbrücken, was not as wide as in the previous year, Saarbrücken attracting 4,796 spectators a game. Bayer Leverkusen II was once more the least-best supported team but managed to raise its average to 401 spectators by game. Overall, support for the league in its second yearwent up.

The teams promoted from the Oberliga at the end of the season were FC 08 Homburg, SC Wiedenbrück and the reserves of Arminia Bielefeld. The reserves of Borussia Dortmund, 2009 champions, and the Wuppertaler SV were relegated from the 3rd Liga to the Regionalliga. Wormatia Worms had left the league for the southern division to avoid an uneven number of teams between the three Regionalligas after two of the three 3rd Liga outgoers had been from the west.

=== 2010–11 season ===
The 2010–11 season saw the league feature thirteen clubs from North Rhine-Westphalia, of which eight are from Westphalia. Of the other five, two were from the Saarland while the remaining three were from Rhineland-Palatinate. Unlike the previous two seasons, no club from outside those three states competes in the league this year.

It also featured a record ten reserve teams, leaving only eight first teams in the league.

The league was won by Preußen Münster, who finished with a ten-point gap to second-placed Eintracht Trier.

=== Since 2012 ===
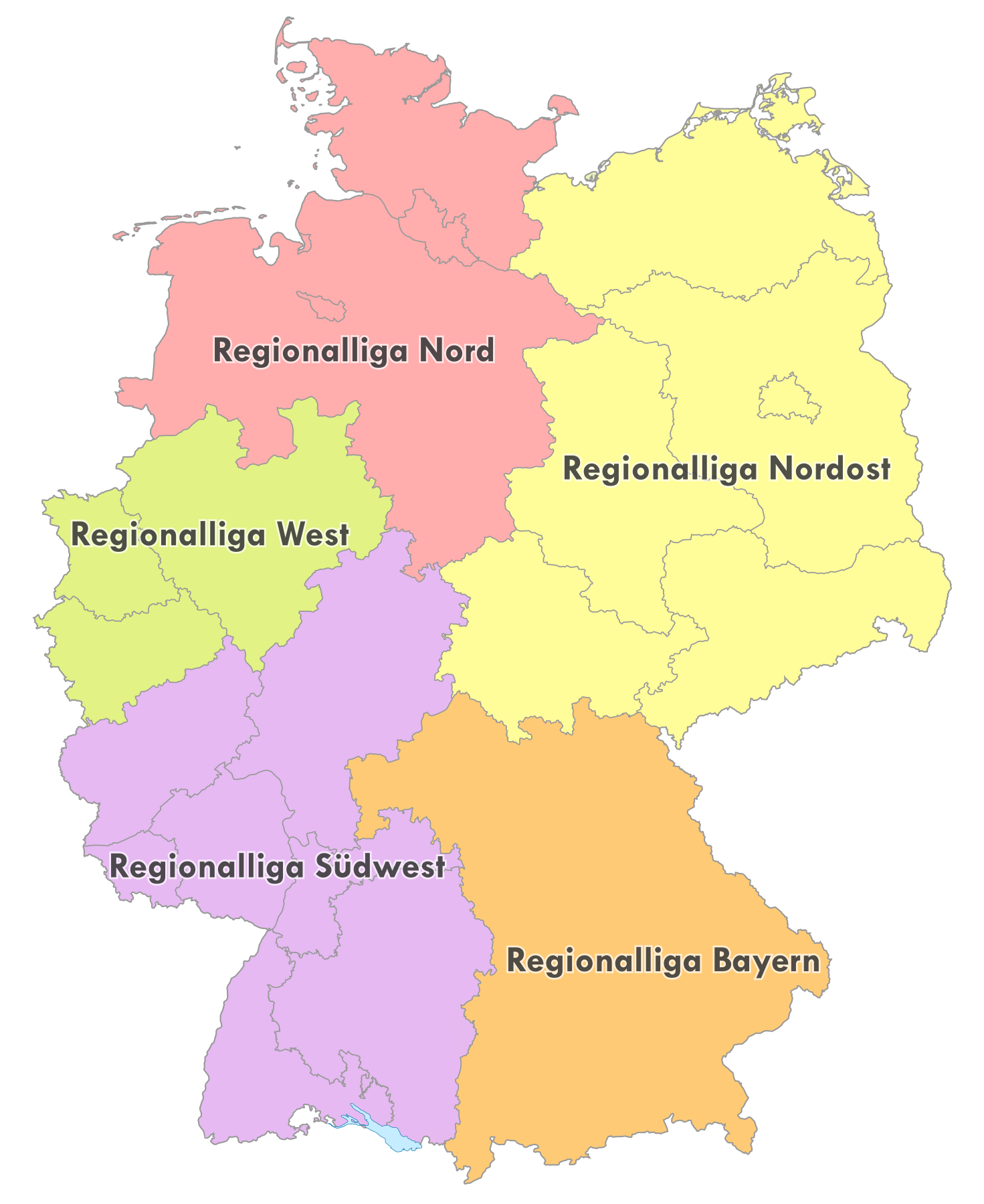
The Fußball-Regionalligen from 2012 onwards.

In October 2010, another reform of the Regionalligas was decided upon. The number of leagues was now expanded to five, with the Regionalliga West losing clubs from the Saarland and Rhineland-Palatinate. The new system came into operation with the start of the 2012–13 season. It was also decided to limit the number of reserve teams per Regionalliga to seven. The later however is planned to be achieved through the shifting of clubs between leagues rather than restricting the overall number of reserve teams.

As four teams were relegated from the 3rd Liga starting at the end of the 2018–19 season, the Regionalliga West champions, along with their counterparts from the Nordost and Südwest, were promoted directly to the 3rd Liga. The West was chosen by a draw. The remaining two champions also determined by the same draw, from the Regionalliga Nord and Bayern, played a two-legged promotion play-off for the last promotion spot. In 2020, the three direct promotion spots will go to the Südwest champions and the champions of the two leagues that participated in the promotion play-off in the previous season, while the Nordost and West champions participate in the play-off. This format was initially installed as a temporary solution until the DFB-Bundestag in September 2019 decided on a format that could have enabled all Regionalliga champions to be promoted. On that date, the Bundestag delegates voted to grant the Südwest and West champions two direct promotions indefinitely starting in 2021. A third direct promotion place will be assigned according to a rotation principle among the Regionalliga Nord, Nordost and Bavarian champions. The representatives from the remaining two Regionalligen will determine the fourth promoted club in two-legged playoffs.

At the end of March 2023, the Western German Football Association (WDFV) confirmed the Regionalliga West's status as a professional league for the first time with regard to the 2023–24 season's licensing procedure. North Rhine-Westphalia had already classified the league as such in the 2020–21 season to enable the "numerous professional footballers" to continue practicing their profession. At that time, for example, the game operations in the four remaining regional leagues had been stopped prematurely.

== Foundation clubs of the Regionalliga West ==
The Regionalliga West was formed in 2008 with 18 clubs, five from the two Regionalligas (III), four each from the Oberligas Südwest, Nordrhein and Westfalen (IV) and one from the Oberliga Nord (IV).

The founding members were:

From the Regionalliga Nord:

- Borussia Dortmund II
- SC Verl
- Rot-Weiss Essen

From the Regionalliga Süd:

- SV Elversberg
- FSV Oggersheim

From the Oberliga Nordrhein:

- Borussia Mönchengladbach II
- 1. FC Köln II
- Bayer Leverkusen II
- 1. FC Kleve

From the Oberliga Westfalen:

- Preußen Münster
- Schalke 04 II
- VfL Bochum II
- Sportfreunde Lotte

From the Oberliga Südwest:

- Mainz 05 II
- 1. FC Kaiserslautern II
- Wormatia Worms
- Eintracht Trier

From the Oberliga Nord:

- BV Cloppenburg

== Winners and runners-up of the Regionalliga West ==
The winners and runners-up of the league are:

Season	Winner	Runner-up
2008–09	**Borussia Dortmund II**	1. FC Kaiserslautern II
2009–10	**1. FC Saarbrücken**	Sportfreunde Lotte
2010–11	**Preußen Münster**	Eintracht Trier
2011–12	**Borussia Dortmund II**	Sportfreunde Lotte
2012–13	Sportfreunde Lotte	Fortuna Köln
2013–14	**Fortuna Köln**	Sportfreunde Lotte
2014–15	Borussia Mönchengladbach II	Alemannia Aachen
2015–16	**Sportfreunde Lotte**	Borussia Mönchengladbach II
2016–17	Viktoria Köln	Borussia Dortmund II
2017–18	**KFC Uerdingen 05**	Viktoria Köln
2018–19	**Viktoria Köln**	Rot-Weiß Oberhausen
2019–20	SV Rödinghausen	**SC Verl**
2020–21	**Borussia Dortmund II**	Rot-Weiss Essen
2021–22	**Rot-Weiss Essen**	Preußen Münster
2022–23	**Preußen Münster**	Wuppertaler SV
2023–24	**Alemannia Aachen**	1. FC Bocholt
2024–25	**MSV Duisburg**	FC Gütersloh
2025–26	**Fortuna Köln**	Rot-Weiß Oberhausen

- Promoted teams in **bold**.

== League statistics ==
The top goal scorers and spectator statistics for the league are:

Season	Overall Spectators	Per game	Best supported Club	Spectators /game	Top goal scorer	Goals
2008–09	419,871	1,372	Rot-Weiss Essen	7,077	Sascha Mölders (RWE)	28
2009–10	510,663	1,669	Rot-Weiss Essen	5,955	Ercan Aydogmus (BSC); Christian Knappmann (SCV)	16
2010–11	305,890	1,000	Preußen Münster	5,640	Robert Mainka (SCW)	18
2011–12	381,689	1,116	Rot-Weiss Essen	6,814	Christian Knappmann (WSV)	30
2012–13	455,207	1,198	Rot-Weiss Essen	8,008	Sven Michel (SFS, BMG)	20
2013–14	561,169	1,641	Rot-Weiss Essen	7,864	Aziz Bouhaddouz (BLII)	24
2014–15	587,606	1,920	Alemannia Aachen	10,724	Jesse Weißenfels (LOT)	20
2015–16	521,017	1,523	Alemannia Aachen	7,951	Marlon Ritter (BMG)	23
2016–17	555,671	1,816	Rot-Weiss Essen	7,865	Mike Wunderlich (VIK)	29
2017–18	502,319	1,642	Rot-Weiss Essen	6,833	Marius Bülter (SVR); Christopher Kramer (WSV)	20
2018–19	474,402	1,550	Rot-Weiss Essen	7,259	Simon Engelmann (SVR)	19
2019–20	409,252	1,819	Rot-Weiss Essen	10,945	Simon Engelmann (SVR)	26

League record

== League placings ==
=== Current extent of league ===
Final league positions for clubs from the region currently covered by the league:

Club	09	10	11	12	13	14	15	16	17	18	19	20	21	22	23	24	25
Preußen Münster	4	6	1	3L	3L	3L	3L	3L	3L	3L	3L	3L	3	2	1	3L	2B
Viktoria Köln					6	4	3	3	1	2	1	3L	3L	3L	3L	3L	3L
SC Verl	8	9	9	10	10	11	7	9	13	8	7	2^{a}	3L	3L	3L	3L	3L
Borussia Dortmund II	1	3L	6	1	3L	3L	3L	4	2	4	5	9	1	3L	3L	3L	3L
Rot-Weiss Essen	7	5^{b}		8	4	9	5	12	5	10	8	3	2	1	3L	3L	3L
Alemannia Aachen	2B	2B	2B	2B	3L	13	2	7	7	6	6	6	14	12	8	1	3L
MSV Duisburg	2B	2B	2B	2B	2B	3L	3L	2B	3L	2B	2B	3L	3L	3L	3L	3L	1
FC Gütersloh																13	2
Sportfreunde Lotte	10	2	3	2	1	2	6	1	3L	3L	3L	7	15	18			3
Rot-Weiß Oberhausen	2B	2B	2B	3L	8	3	4	5	4	9	2	4	7	4	7	7	4
SV Rödinghausen							8	14	10	5	3	1^{a}	6	6	4	8	5
Fortuna Köln				7	2	1	3L	3L	3L	3L	3L	10	4	5	6	4	6
Borussia Mönchengladbach II	6	16^{b}	5	3	7	7	1	2	3	12	4	8	11	13	3	12	7
1. FC Köln II	3	4	7	6	16^{c}	12	10	15	6	14	9	5	5	7	14	6	8
SC Paderborn II																14	9
1. FC Bocholt															15	2	10
Fortuna Düsseldorf II		11	16	19	12	10	9	6	12	15	12	11	9	11	13	11	11
SC Wiedenbrück			10	15	9	16	12	11	14	7	17		10	8	12	10	12
Wuppertaler SV	3L	3L	8	5	15^{c}				11	3	10	13	12	3	2	3	13
Schalke 04 II	15	12	11	11	3	6	11	10	16			12	8	9	9	5	14
SV Eintracht Hohkeppel																	15
1. FC Düren															10	9	16
KFC Uerdingen 05						17	15			1	3L	3L	3L	19			17^{l}
Türkspor Dortmund																	17^{l}
SV Lippstadt 08						18					13	16	16	14	11	15	
SSVg Velbert					13	19		16								16	
FC Wegberg-Beeck								19^{f}		16			17	17		17	
Rot-Weiss Ahlen	2B	2B	3L					13	15				18	10	16	18	
1. FC Kaan-Marienborn											15				5^{j}		
Wattenscheid 09						15	13	8	8	11	11	19^{e}			17		
SV Straelen											16		13	15	18		
Bonner SC		10^{b}							9	13	14	14	19	16			
VfB Homberg												18	20	20			
SV Bergisch Gladbach 09					18							17	21				
TuS Haltern												15^{d}					
TV Herkenrath											18						
TuS Erndtebrück								17		17							
Westfalia Rhynern										18							
TSG Sprockhövel									17								
Sportfreunde Siegen					5	5	17		18^{g}								
FC Kray					20		14	18									
VfL Bochum II	14	3	14	14	14	14	16^{h}										
FC Hennef 05							18										
Bayer Leverkusen II	9	13	15	18	11	8^{i}											
VfB Hüls					17												
MSV Duisburg II					19												
Arminia Bielefeld II			18														
1. FC Kleve	18																

=== Former extent of league ===
Final league positions for clubs from the regions formerly covered by the league:

Club	09	10	11	12	13	14	15	16	17	18	19	20	21	22
Waldhof Mannheim		14^{a}			RL	RL	RL	RL	RL	RL	RL	3L	3L	3L
1. FC Saarbrücken		1	3L	3L	3L	3L	RL	RL	RL	RL	RL	RL	3L	3L
Mainz 05 II	5	15	13	12	RL	RL	3L	3L	3L	RL	RL	RL	RL	RL
SV Elversberg	11	7	12	13	RL	3L	RL	RL	RL	RL	RL	RL	RL	RL
FC 08 Homburg			17		RL	RL	RL	RL	RL		RL	RL	RL	RL
Wormatia Worms	16	17^{a}	RL	RL	RL	RL	RL	RL	RL	RL	RL			
TuS Koblenz	2B	2B	3L	17	RL	RL	RL		RL	RL				
Eintracht Trier	13	18^{a}	2	4	RL	RL	RL	RL	RL					
1. FC Kaiserslautern II	2	8	4	9	RL	RL	RL	RL	RL					
BV Cloppenburg	17				RL	RL	RL	RL						
SC Idar-Oberstein				16	RL									
FSV Oggersheim	12^{k}													

=== Key ===
Symbol	Key
B	Bundesliga
2B	2. Bundesliga
3L	3. Liga
1	League champions
Place	League
Blank	Played at a league level below this league
RL	Played in one of the other Regionalligas

=== Notes ===
- ^aSV Rödinghausen did not apply for a 3. Liga licence. SC Verl was promoted instead.
- ^bAt the end of the 2009–10 season, Rot-Weiss Essen, Waldhof Mannheim and Bonner SC were refused a Regionalliga licence and relegated. The three last-placed teams were therefore not relegated. Wormatia Worms was transferred into the southern group for 2010–11.
- ^cWuppertaler SV declared insolvency after the end of the 2012–13 season and was relegated, 1. FC Köln II inherited the club's league place.
- ^dTuS Haltern withdrew from competition at the end of the 2019–20 season.
- ^eWattenscheid 09 declared insolvency during the 2019–20 season and was relegated. All results were expunged.
- ^fFC Wegberg-Beeck withdrew from competition at the end of the 2015–16 season.
- ^gSportfreunde Siegen withdrew from competition at the end of the 2016–17 season.
- ^hVfL Bochum II withdrew from competition at the end of the 2014–15 season.
- ^iBayer Leverkusen II withdrew from competition at the end of the 2013–14 season.
- ^j1. FC Kaan-Marienborn withdrew from competition at the end of the 2022–23 season.
- ^kAt the end of the 2008–09 season, FSV Oggersheim did not apply for a Regionalliga licence and was relegated. Wormatia Worms therefore remained in the league.
- ^lTürkspor Dortmund and KFC Uerdingen withdrew during the 2024–25 season and were relegated in joint-last position.
