= 2007–08 Regionalliga =

14th season of the Regionalliga as a third-level league

Regionalliga
- Season: 2007–08
- Promoted: Rot Weiss Ahlen; Rot-Weiß Oberhausen; FSV Frankfurt; FC Ingolstadt 04
- Relegated: Sportfreunde Siegen

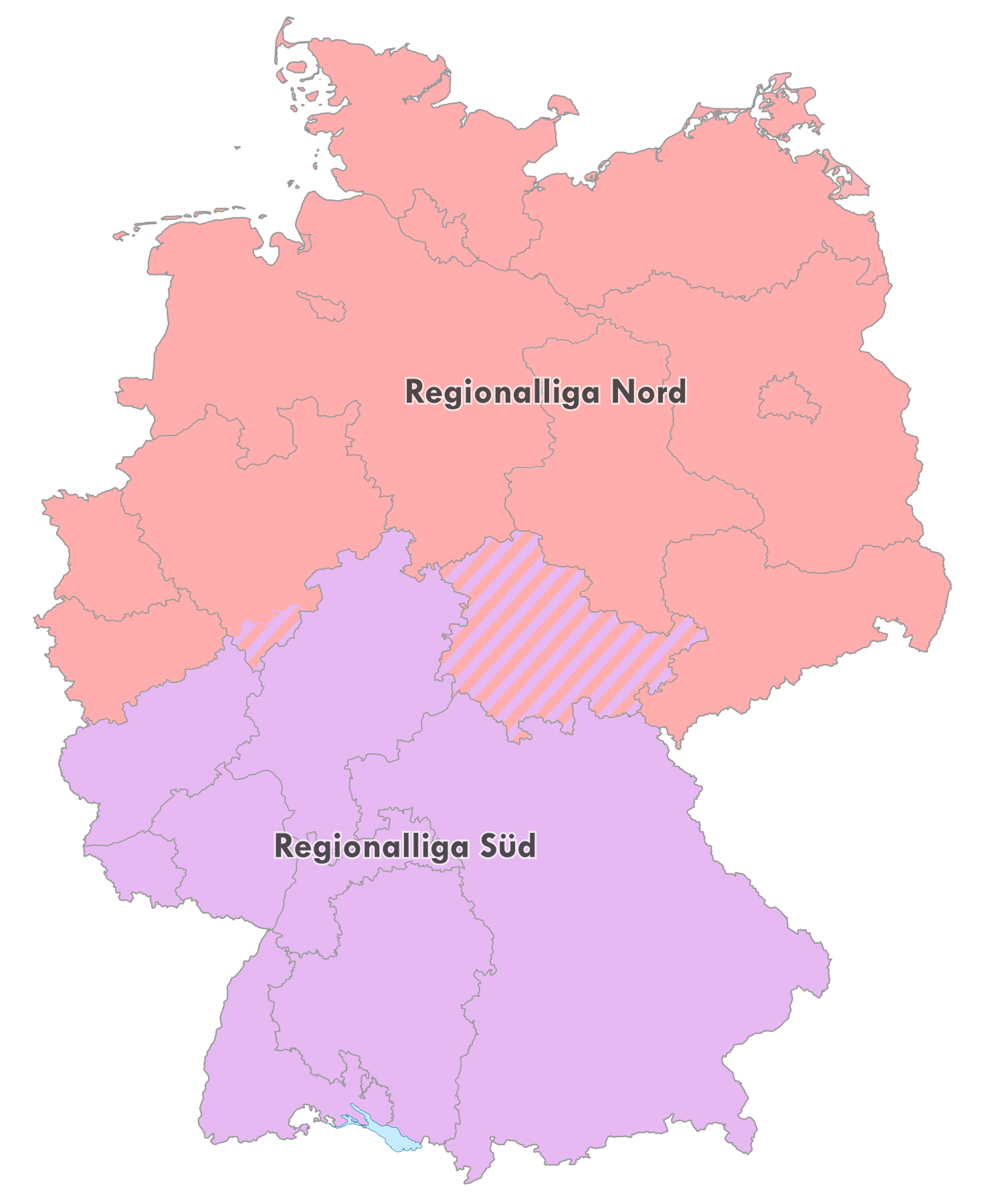
Map of German Soccer Regionalliga, 2000-2008

The 2007–08 Regionalliga season was the 14th season of the Regionalliga at tier three of the German football league system. It was contested in two geographical divisions with eighteen teams in the south and nineteen in the north. The champions, Rot Weiss Ahlen and FSV Frankfurt, and the runners-up, Rot-Weiß Oberhausen and FC Ingolstadt 04, of every division were promoted to the 2. Bundesliga.

With the introduction of the 3. Liga for the 2008–09 season, 2007–08 was the final season of the Regionalliga as the third tier of German football. Qualification for the new league was determined through this 2007–08 season's 2. Bundesliga and the Regionalliga. Because of the introduction of the 3. Liga above and a third regional division of the Regionalliga, the Regionalliga West, only one club was relegated from the league after declaring insolvency.

== North ==
=== Table ===
Pos	Team	Pld	W	D	L	GF	GA	GD	Pts	Promotion or relegation
1	Rot Weiss Ahlen (C, P)	36	19	10	7	73	41	+32	67	Promotion to 2. Bundesliga
2	Rot-Weiß Oberhausen (P)	36	19	9	8	64	32	+32	66	Promotion to 2. Bundesliga
3	Fortuna Düsseldorf (Q)	36	19	7	10	49	29	+20	64	Qualification to 3. Liga
4	1. FC Union Berlin (Q)	36	17	9	10	67	49	+18	60	Qualification to 3. Liga
5	SV Werder Bremen II (Q)	36	18	5	13	52	44	+8	59	Qualification to 3. Liga
6	Wuppertaler SV (Q)	36	17	7	12	60	50	+10	58	Qualification to 3. Liga
7	Rot-Weiß Erfurt (Q)	36	15	11	10	70	46	+24	56	Qualification to 3. Liga
8	SG Dynamo Dresden (Q)	36	15	10	11	45	39	+6	55	Qualification to 3. Liga
9	Kickers Emden (Q)	36	16	6	14	43	39	+4	54	Qualification to 3. Liga
10	Eintracht Braunschweig (Q)	36	13	14	9	55	50	+5	53	Qualification to 3. Liga
11	1. FC Magdeburg	36	14	11	11	39	37	+2	53	Qualification to Regionalliga
12	Rot-Weiss Essen	36	14	9	13	42	36	+6	51	Qualification to Regionalliga
13	Borussia Dortmund II	36	12	12	12	35	37	−2	48	Qualification to Regionalliga
14	Energie Cottbus II	36	12	8	16	31	44	−13	44	Qualification to Regionalliga
15	SV Babelsberg 03	36	8	10	18	33	53	−20	34	Qualification to Regionalliga
16	VfB Lübeck	36	9	7	20	32	58	−26	34	Qualification to Regionalliga
17	Hamburger SV II	36	8	9	19	36	58	−22	33	Qualification to Regionalliga
18	SC Verl	36	9	5	22	32	55	−23	32	Qualification to Regionalliga
19	VfL Wolfsburg II	36	5	7	24	20	81	−61	22	Qualification to Regionalliga

Source: "RL Nord: Spielpaarungen, Tabelle und Ergebnisse der Saison 2007/08 am 38. Spieltag" (in German). 7 August 2008. Archived from the original on 6 August 2010.
Rules for classification: 1) points; 2) goal difference; 3) number of goals scored.
(C) Champions; (P) Promoted; (Q) Qualified for the phase indicated

=== Results ===
Home \ Away	AHL	OBE	DUE	BER	BRE	WUP	ERF	DRE	EMD	BRA	MAG	ESS	DOR	COT	BAB	LÜB	HSV	VER	WOL
Rot Weiss Ahlen		1–3	5–1	3–1	4–2	2–5	1–2	1–2	2–0	0–1	3–1	2–0	1–1	1–0	3–0	3–0	3–0	4–1	1–1
Rot-Weiß Oberhausen	0–0		2–2	3–0	1–2	0–1	0–0	0–1	3–2	2–0	2–1	1–0	3–1	0–0	3–2	3–0	5–1	4–2	5–0
Fortuna Düsseldorf	1–1	3–0		0–1	2–0	2–0	2–0	1–2	0–2	1–1	0–2	0–0	4–0	3–0	2–0	0–1	1–0	3–0	3–0
1. FC Union Berlin	4–4	0–3	0–1		2–0	1–1	1–1	4–2	1–0	2–2	1–2	2–2	2–1	0–1	1–1	4–3	2–1	0–0	4–0
SV Werder Bremen II	0–0	3–2	2–0	1–0		2–1	1–2	1–2	2–1	1–1	3–0	0–4	3–1	3–1	0–0	3–2	2–0	0–2	3–0
Wuppertaler SV B.	0–4	2–0	0–1	4–3	0–2		3–0	1–1	0–0	1–1	1–2	2–2	1–1	4–3	4–0	2–1	0–2	1–0	7–2
Rot-Weiß Erfurt	6–3	1–2	0–4	2–0	3–1	5–1		2–2	3–0	2–2	4–1	4–0	0–0	0–1	1–1	1–1	3–1	3–0	5–0
Dynamo Dresden	1–3	0–2	0–0	0–1	0–2	3–0	2–2		2–1	1–1	1–0	1–0	0–0	1–0	3–2	0–0	4–1	2–0	3–0
Kickers Emden	1–0	2–0	1–2	1–0	2–1	1–2	1–0	2–1		0–1	1–0	0–0	4–1	1–0	3–1	0–2	3–2	2–0	1–2
E. Braunschweig	0–2	2–1	1–1	3–5	0–0	1–4	3–2	3–2	0–1		1–1	2–1	2–0	5–0	1–3	3–3	2–1	3–2	3–1
1. FC Magdeburg	2–2	0–0	1–0	1–1	1–1	2–0	3–3	1–0	1–3	1–1		0–1	0–2	1–1	1–1	3–0	2–0	2–0	2–0
Rot-Weiss Essen	0–2	1–4	0–0	0–3	3–0	1–0	3–2	1–1	0–1	0–0	2–0		0–0	0–1	1–2	0–1	2–1	2–0	3–0
Borussia Dortmund II	0–2	0–0	0–1	1–1	1–4	1–1	1–1	2–0	3–2	1–0	0–1	0–0		2–0	1–0	1–0	3–1	1–0	1–2
FC E. Cottbus II	1–1	0–0	0–1	0–2	1–0	0–1	2–1	1–1	4–2	3–2	2–1	1–2	0–3		0–1	1–1	2–0	0–1	0–0
SV Babelsberg 03	1–3	1–4	3–0	0–3	1–2	1–0	1–1	0–1	1–1	1–2	0–0	1–3	0–0	0–1		1–0	1–3	0–1	3–2
VfB Lübeck	0–2	0–0	3–1	3–7	3–0	0–2	0–3	1–0	2–1	0–0	0–1	1–2	0–4	0–1	1–0		3–1	0–3	0–1
Hamburger SV II	1–1	0–0	0–3	0–2	0–2	2–3	2–1	2–0	0–0	1–1	0–0	0–3	0–0	2–1	0–0	3–0		1–1	3–0
SC Verl	2–2	1–2	1–2	2–3	0–3	0–3	0–1	1–1	0–0	0–2	0–1	1–0	1–0	0–1	1–3	1–0	0–2		5–1
VfL Wolfsburg II	0–1	0–4	0–1	0–3	1–0	1–2	0–3	0–2	0–0	3–2	0–1	0–3	0–1	1–1	0–0	0–0	2–2	0–3	

Legend: Blue = home team win; Yellow = draw; Red = away team win.

== South ==
=== Table ===
Pos	Team	Pld	W	D	L	GF	GA	GD	Pts	Promotion or relegation
1	FSV Frankfurt (C, P)	34	17	11	6	57	31	+26	62	Promotion to 2. Bundesliga
2	FC Ingolstadt 04 (P)	34	18	8	8	50	36	+14	62	Promotion to 2. Bundesliga
3	VfB Stuttgart II (Q)	34	17	8	9	52	30	+22	59	Qualification to 3. Liga
4	VfR Aalen (Q)	34	16	9	9	64	45	+19	57	Qualification to 3. Liga
5	SV Sandhausen (Q)	34	17	6	11	48	38	+10	57	Qualification to 3. Liga
6	SpVgg Unterhaching (Q)	34	15	9	10	55	44	+11	54	Qualification to 3. Liga
7	SV Wacker Burghausen (Q)	34	12	13	9	36	37	−1	49	Qualification to 3. Liga
8	FC Bayern Munich II (Q)	34	12	11	11	53	42	+11	47	Qualification to 3. Liga
9	SSV Jahn Regensburg (Q)	34	14	5	15	40	48	−8	47	Qualification to 3. Liga
10	Stuttgarter Kickers (Q)	34	11	12	11	38	35	+3	45	Qualification to 3. Liga
11	Sportfreunde Siegen (R)	34	10	15	9	35	37	−2	45	Relegation to Oberliga (Note: Sportfreunde Siegen filed for insolvency after the season and therefore had to relegate themselves forcefully.)
12	SSV Reutlingen 05	34	10	14	10	45	46	−1	44	Qualification to Regionalliga
13	TSV 1860 München II	34	12	6	16	40	44	−4	42	Qualification to Regionalliga
14	KSV Hessen Kassel	34	8	14	12	51	57	−6	38	Qualification to Regionalliga
15	SV Elversberg	34	10	8	16	35	52	−17	38	Qualification to Regionalliga
16	Karlsruher SC II	34	8	13	13	33	45	−12	37	Qualification to Regionalliga
17	SC Pfullendorf	34	8	10	16	35	37	−2	34	Qualification to Regionalliga
18	FSV Ludwigshafen-Oggersheim	34	2	6	26	17	74	−57	12	Qualification to Regionalliga

Source: "RL Süd: Spielpaarungen, Tabelle und Ergebnisse der Saison 2007/08 am 38. Spieltag" (in German). 7 August 2008. Archived from the original on 6 August 2010.
Rules for classification: 1) points; 2) goal difference; 3) number of goals scored.
(C) Champions; (P) Promoted; (Q) Qualified for the phase indicated; (R) Relegated

=== Results ===
Home \ Away	FRA	ING	VFB	AAL	SAN	UNT	BUR	BAY	REG	STU	SIE	REU	MUE	KAS	ELV	KSC	PFU	OGG
FSV Frankfurt		3–1	1–1	2–0	0–2	1–0	1–1	2–2	1–3	0–0	1–1	2–2	1–2	0–0	2–0	1–1	3–2	2–0
FC Ingolstadt 04	0–5		3–1	2–1	0–0	2–0	1–1	1–0	0–1	2–3	2–2	2–0	2–1	3–0	1–1	1–1	2–0	2–1
VfB Stuttgart II	1–1	0–1		2–3	4–0	2–3	1–1	1–0	1–2	1–0	2–2	0–1	1–2	1–0	2–0	2–1	2–0	2–0
VfR Aalen	1–0	4–0	1–2		3–1	0–0	2–2	1–1	2–5	1–0	2–1	5–1	2–0	1–2	2–1	2–0	2–2	5–0
SV Sandhausen	0–3	0–3	1–0	3–0		1–0	3–0	3–3	1–0	2–2	1–0	0–1	1–0	3–2	1–2	1–0	2–0	3–0
SpVgg Unterhaching	1–4	3–0	1–1	2–2	3–2		1–1	0–0	1–0	2–0	1–1	2–0	2–2	5–3	4–1	4–0	2–1	3–0
SV Wacker Burghausen	0–1	1–0	1–1	1–4	1–0	2–0		3–1	1–0	1–2	1–2	1–0	0–0	3–1	2–3	0–0	1–0	1–0
FC Bayern Munich II	2–1	1–1	1–3	0–1	3–1	2–4	1–1		3–1	0–1	3–1	0–0	1–0	4–0	1–1	3–1	2–1	7–0
SSV Jahn Regensburg	0–2	1–3	0–3	1–1	2–1	2–1	1–2	2–0		1–1	0–1	0–3	2–1	0–2	2–2	1–4	1–0	0–0
Stuttgarter Kickers	1–1	0–1	1–1	5–1	1–2	2–0	1–1	0–1	1–3		1–1	1–1	1–2	0–2	0–0	2–0	2–0	1–0
Sportfreunde Siegen	0–1	0–1	0–2	1–1	1–2	3–1	1–0	1–1	1–3	1–1		2–1	1–0	1–1	0–0	1–1	1–0	4–2
SSV Reutlingen	0–1	2–0	0–2	1–1	3–1	2–2	1–1	2–1	2–0	3–1	1–1		1–4	0–0	4–0	1–1	0–4	3–1
TSV 1860 München II	1–5	0–2	0–1	3–0	0–2	0–1	5–0	3–2	0–1	1–0	3–0	2–2		2–2	0–0	2–1	1–0	0–1
KSV Hessen Kassel	1–1	1–1	1–1	1–3	0–3	2–2	1–1	2–3	4–0	1–1	0–0	3–3	4–0		3–0	4–0	3–1	1–1
SV Elversberg	1–2	1–5	2–0	1–3	0–4	2–0	1–0	3–0	0–2	0–2	0–0	1–0	2–0	1–1		1–2	0–1	2–0
Karlsruher SC II	1–3	1–1	0–5	1–1	1–1	0–1	0–1	0–0	1–0	0–0	1–2	0–0	2–1	6–1	3–1		1–1	1–0
SC Pfullendorf	2–0	0–3	0–1	1–0	0–0	2–1	1–1	0–0	1–1	1–2	0–0	1–1	0–1	5–2	3–1	0–0		3–2
FSV Oggersheim	1–3	0–1	0–2	0–6	0–0	1–2	0–2	0–4	1–2	1–2	0–1	3–3	1–1	1–0	0–4	0–1	0–0	

Legend: Blue = home team win; Yellow = draw; Red = away team win.
