= Regionalliga =

- Organising body: DFB
- Founded: 1963; 63 years ago
- Country: Germany
- Confederation: UEFA (Europe)
- Divisions: Regionalliga Nord; Regionalliga Nordost; Regionalliga West; Regionalliga Südwest; Regionalliga Bayern
- Number of clubs: 90
- Level on pyramid: 2 (1963–1974); 3 (1994–2008); 4 (2008–present)
- Promotion to: 3. Liga
- Relegation to: Oberliga
- Current champions: SV Meppen (Nord); Lokomotive Leipzig (Nordost); Fortuna Köln (West); Sonnenhof Großaspach (Südwest); 1. FC Nürnberg II (Bayern) (2025–26)
- Current: 2025–26 Regionalliga

A Regionalliga (German pronunciation: [ʁeɡi̯oˈnaːlˌliːɡa], plural Regionalligen) is a regional league in numerous sports governing bodies in Germany, Austria and Switzerland, usually located in the upper or middle tiers of the sports leagues.

The term is often associated with the German football league system where it is the fourth tier or one of the three divisions of Regionalliga in Austria, which represent the third tier in that country. Until 1974, Regionalliga was the second tier in Germany. In 1994, it was reintroduced as the third tier. Upon the creation of the new Germany-wide 3. Liga in 2008, it became the fourth tier. While all of the clubs in the top three divisions of German football are professional, the Regionalliga has a mixture of professional and semi-professional clubs.

== History of the Regionalligen in Germany ==
=== 1963–1974 ===
From the introduction of the Bundesliga in 1963 until the formation of the 2. Bundesliga in 1974, there were five Regionalligen, forming the second tier of German Football:

- Regionalliga Nord (covering the states of Lower Saxony, Schleswig-Holstein, Bremen and Hamburg)
- Regionalliga West (covering the state of North Rhine-Westphalia)
- Regionalliga Berlin (covering West Berlin)
- Regionalliga Südwest (covering the states of Rheinland-Palatinate and Saarland)
- Regionalliga Süd (covering the states of Bavaria, Hesse and Baden-Württemberg)

The champions and runners-up of the respective divisions played out two promotion spots to the Bundesliga in two groups after the end of the season.

In 1974, the two 2. Bundesligen, Süd and Nord became the second tier of German Football and the Regionalligen ceased existing for the next 20 years.

=== 1994–2000 ===
In 1994, the Regionalligen were re-introduced, this time as the third tier of German Football. There were initially four Regionalligen:

- Regionalliga Süd (covering the states of Bavaria, Hesse and Baden-Württemberg)
- Regionalliga West/Südwest (covering the states of Rhineland-Palatinate, Saarland and North Rhine-Westphalia)
- Regionalliga Nord (covering the states of Lower Saxony, Schleswig-Holstein, Bremen and Hamburg)
- Regionalliga Nordost (covering the states of Brandenburg, Berlin, Mecklenburg-Vorpommern, Saxony-Anhalt, Thuringia and Saxony; i.e. the former GDR and the city of West Berlin)

Between 1994 and 2000, promotion to the 2. Bundesliga was regulated without much continuity. It was a problematic rule, as becoming champion of a division did not automatically mean promotion for that team. The champions of the South and West/Southwest divisions were automatically promoted, however, along with one of the two runners-up. The champions of the North and Northeast divisions had a play-off to decide who would get the fourth promotion spot. This rule was justified because there are more clubs in the southern part of Germany than the north.

In 1998, the promotion rule was changed again: the winner of the play-off between the North and Northeast division champions was promoted, while the loser faced the runners-up from the West/Southwest and South divisions in another play-off for the remaining promotion spot.

=== 2000–2008 ===
In 2000 the number of Regionalligen was reduced to two:

- Regionalliga Nord (covering northern Germany)
- Regionalliga Süd (covering southern Germany)

The new divisional alignment was not bound to certain states any more so teams were moved between the divisions in order to balance club numbers. This led to some clubs in the Southern division being geographically further north than some northern clubs, and vice versa.

The champions and the runners-up of both divisions were promoted to the 2. Bundesliga.

=== 2008–2012 ===
In 2008, the Regionalligen were demoted to become the fourth tier of football in Germany after the introduction of a new nationwide 3. Liga. However, there was an expansion to three divisions:

- Regionalliga Nord (covering the states of Brandenburg, Berlin, Mecklenburg-Vorpommern, Saxony-Anhalt, Thuringia, Saxony, Lower Saxony, Schleswig-Holstein, Bremen and Hamburg)
- Regionalliga Süd (covering the states of Bavaria, Hesse and Baden-Württemberg)
- Regionalliga West (covering the states of Rhineland-Palatinate, Saarland and North Rhine-Westphalia)

In order to have 18 teams assigned to each division every year the divisions were annually re-aligned DFB, which could necessitate assigning teams to a division other than their geographical one. An example of this is BV Cloppenburg, which was assigned to the Western division for the 2008–09 season despite being located in Lower Saxony.

=== 2012–present ===
In October 2010, yet another reform of the Regionalligen was decided upon, with the number of leagues expanding to five and beginning play in the 2012–13 season. Under this new format, the old Regionalliga Nordost would be re-established and the new Regionalliga Südwest and Regionalliga Bayern would be created. The Südwest would take clubs from the southern portion of the Regionalliga West and also everything from the Regionallia Süd outside of Bavaria. It was also decided to limit the number of reserve teams per Regionalliga to seven.

The five league champions and the runners-up of the Regionalliga Südwest play-off for the three promotion spots in a home-and-away series. The new leagues consist of up to 22 clubs in their inaugural seasons but were reduced to between 16 and 18 clubs. The Regionalligen are not administered by the DFB but rather by the regional football associations. In regards to reserve teams, initially only seven were permitted per league, however, this rule may be subject to change under certain circumstances. Reserve sides of 3. Liga teams are not permitted in the Regionalliga.

The reorganisation of the Regionalligen so soon after the last changes in 2008 became necessary because of a large number of insolvencies. These were caused by a lack of media interest in the leagues combined with large expenses and infrastructure demands. The five Regionalligen from 2012 are:

- Regionalliga Nord (covering the states of Lower Saxony, Schleswig-Holstein, Bremen and Hamburg)
- Regionalliga Nordost (covering the states of Brandenburg, Berlin, Mecklenburg-Vorpommern, Saxony-Anhalt, Thuringia and Saxony)
- Regionalliga West (covering the state of North Rhine-Westphalia)
- Regionalliga Südwest (covering the states of Rhineland-Palatinate, Saarland, Hesse and Baden-Württemberg)
- Regionalliga Bayern (covering the state of Bavaria)

Some regional football associations also made changes to the league system below the Regionalliga in their area. From the 2012–13 season, the Bavarian Football Association split the Bayernliga into a northern and a southern division, and increased the number of Landesligen from three to five.

At the end of March 2023, the Western German Football Association (WDFV) confirmed the Regionalliga West's status as a professional league for the first time with regard to the 2023–24 season's licensing procedure. North Rhine-Westphalia had already classified the league as such in the 2020–21 season to enable the "numerous professional footballers" to continue practicing their profession. At that time, for example, the game operations in the four remaining regional leagues had been stopped prematurely.

=== Changes to promotion rules from 2018 ===
At the 96th DFB-Bundestag in December 2017, delegates decided to change the promotion rules and, without success, reduce the number of leagues to four. To achieve this, a temporary solution was put into place for the 2018–19 and 2019–20 seasons. Four teams were promoted and there were three guaranteed promotion places from the champions of the five regional leagues. The champion of the southwest league, which gave up its second play-offs place, were promoted automatically in the next two seasons. Additionally there were two teams promoted from the other four regional leagues. In the 2018–19 season, the champion of the northeast league was also promoted directly. The winner of the third guaranteed promotion place was decided by the drawing of lots. The remaining two regional league champions of the 2018–19 season faced off in a two-legged play-offs determining the fourth promotion place. The two regional leagues whose teams took part in the play-offs automatically had promotion places for the 2019–20 season. As a result, the third division has had four relegation places.

At the 97th DFB-Bundestag in 2019, a working group under DFB vice-president Peter Frymuth unsuccessfully proposed a system involving four rather than five regional leagues. Instead, the delegates reformed the promotion scheme from the 2020–21 season, in which there continued to be four promotions to the 3. Liga. The Regionalliga West and Südwest each provide a fixed direct promotion. Another direct promotion place is assigned according to a rotation principle among the Regionalligen Nord, Nordost and Bayern champions. The representatives from the remaining two Regionalligen determine the fourth promoted club in two-legged play-offs.

=== Maps ===
The history and development of the Regionalligen in maps:

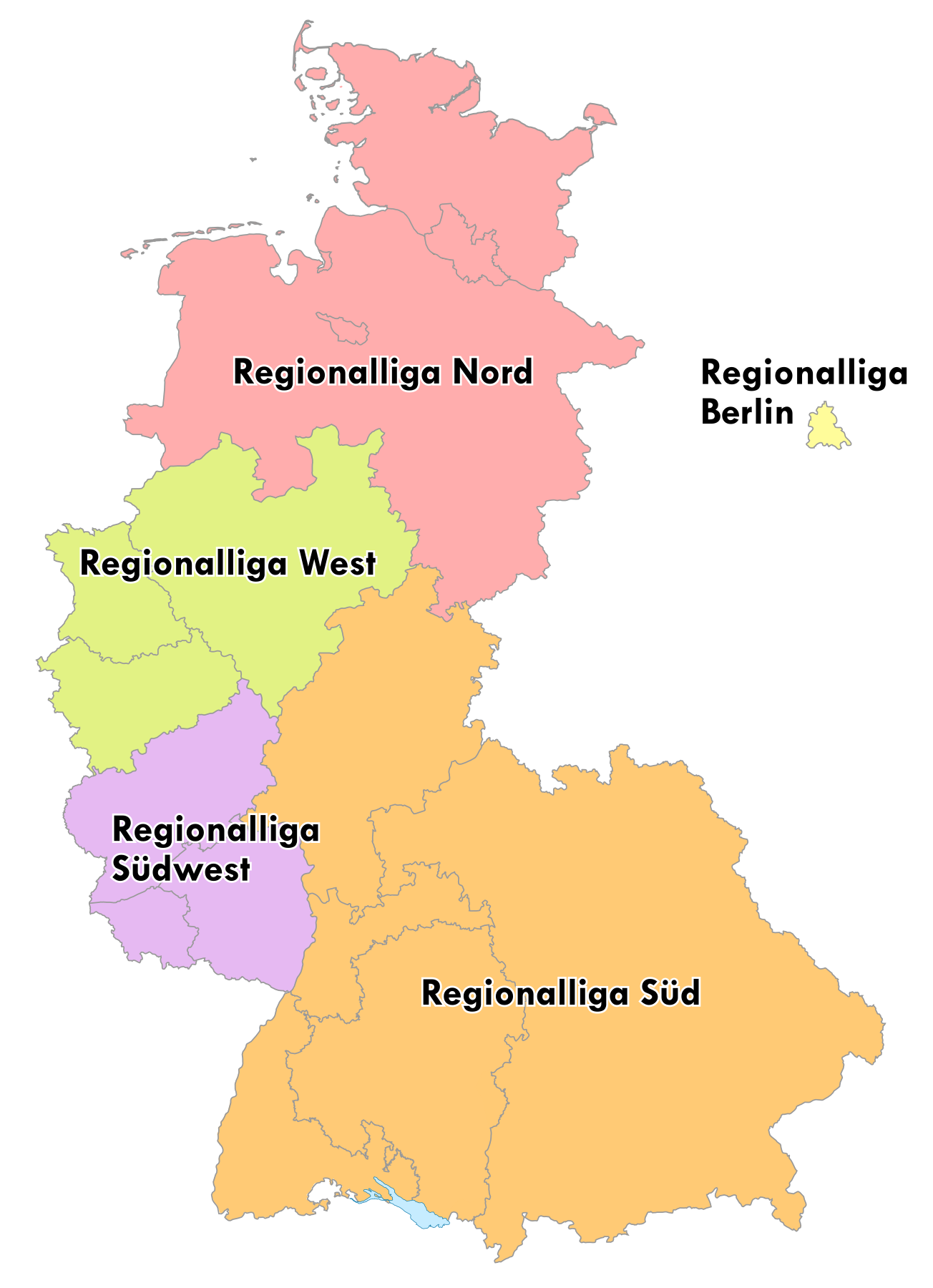
The Regionalligen from 1963 to 1974.

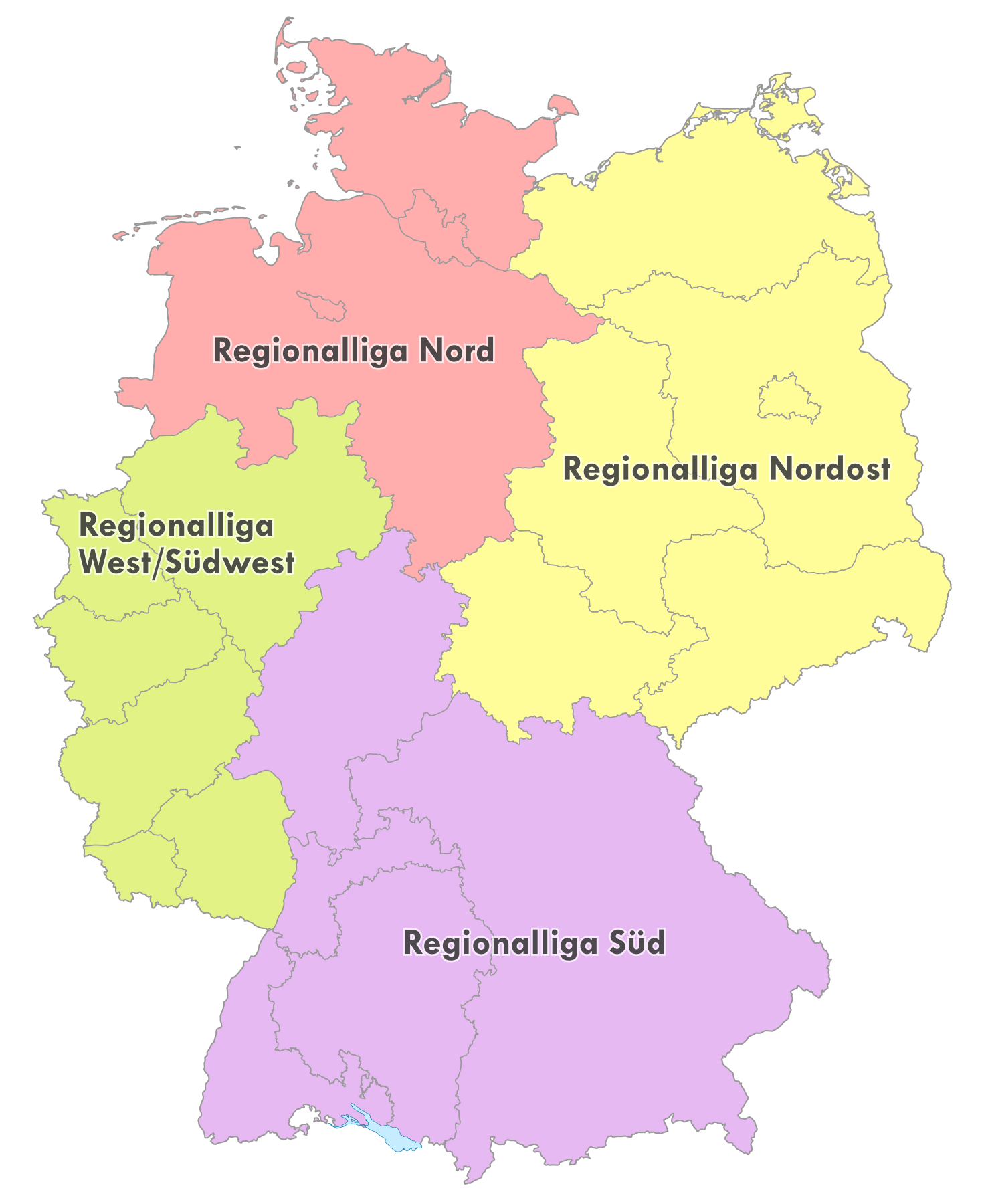
The Regionalligen from 1994 to 2000.

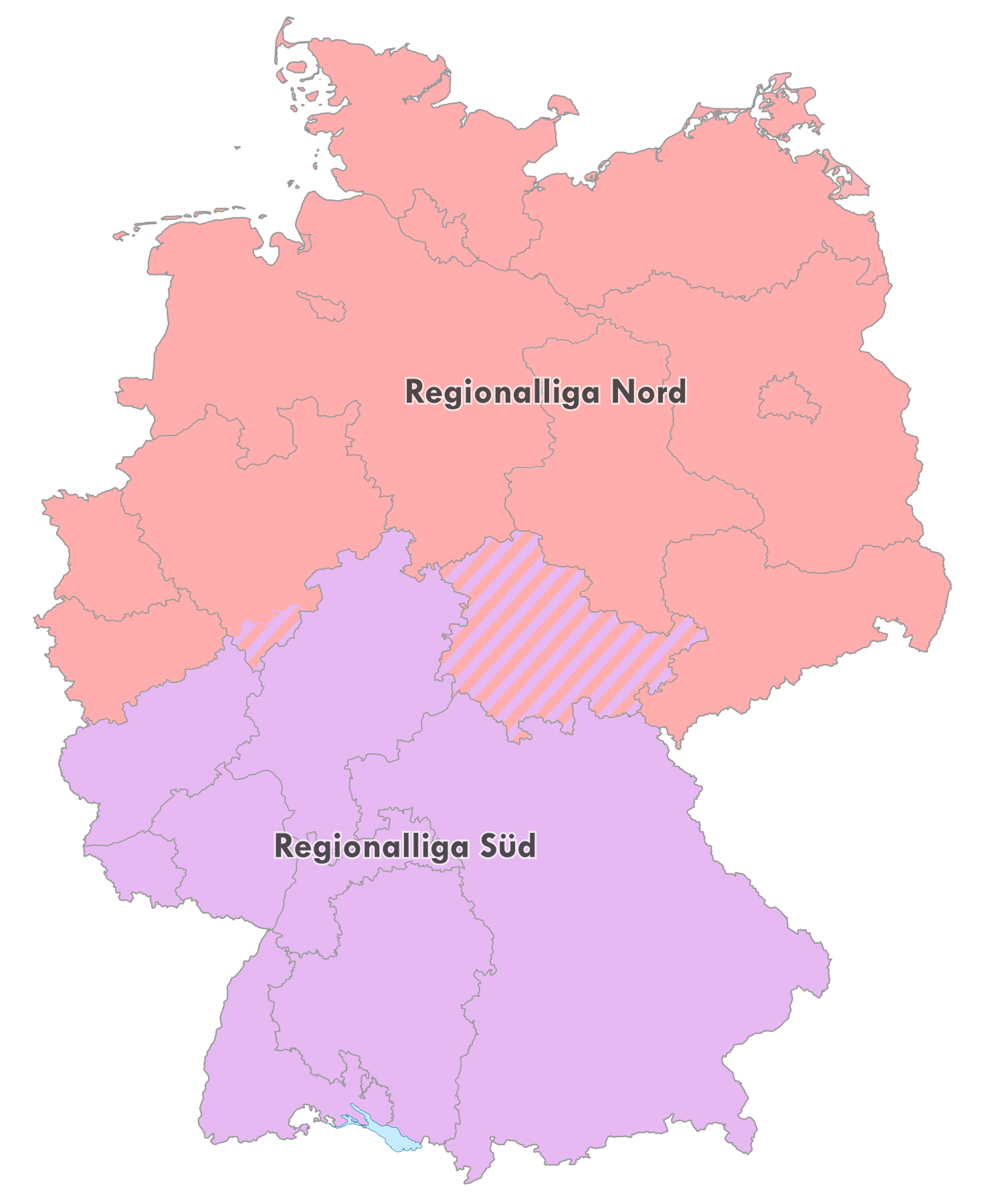
The Regionalligen from 2000 to 2008.

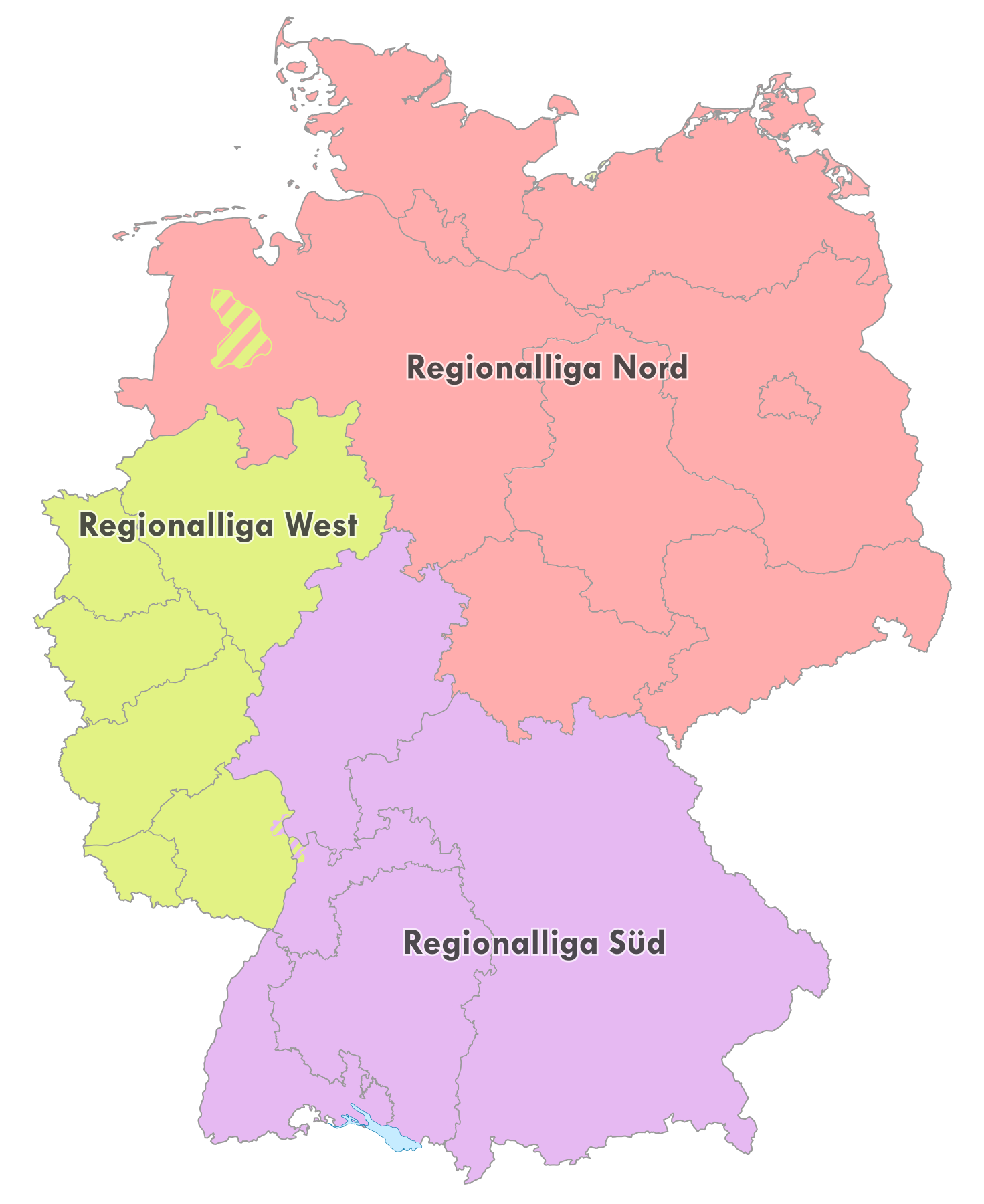
The Regionalligen from 2008 to 2012.

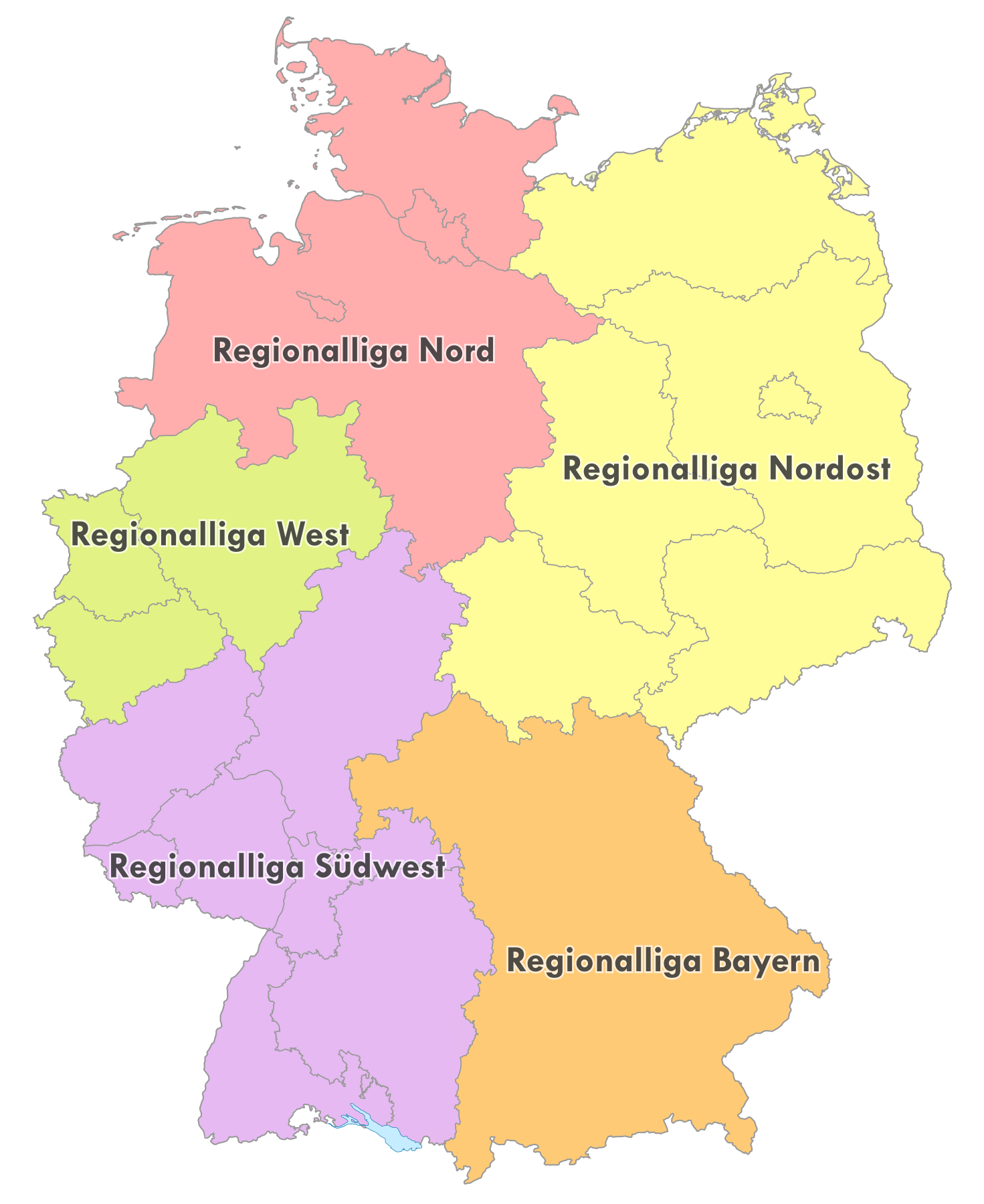
The Regionalligen from 2012 onwards.

== League setup ==
=== Licensing ===
A club that wants to play in the Regionalliga must meet two conditions. First, the team must qualify for the league. Second, the club must obtain a license from the DFB. This license is granted if the club can prove that they are financially sound, that their stadium conforms to the security regulations, and that they have a working youth section.

=== Promotion ===
The champions of three divisions are automatically promoted; the remaining two take part in the promotion round to the 3. Liga at the end of the season for the fourth promotion. Reserve teams are also eligible for promotion unless the respective first team is playing in the 3. Liga.

=== Relegation ===
At least the bottom two teams of each division are demoted to their respective Oberliga. The actual number of teams relegated from every division depends on the number of relegations from the 3. Liga and promotions from the Oberliga.

As clubs in the Regionalliga must have their teams licensed by the DFB on a per-season basis, a team may also be relegated by having its license revoked or by going into administration. Reserve teams are also relegated when the respective first team is relegated to the 3. Liga.

=== Squad rules ===
Matchday squads in the Regionalliga must include at least six players of German nationality and under the age of 24, two under the age of 21, and a maximum of three non-EU players.

== Champions ==
=== 1963–1974 ===
Season	Regionalliga Nord	Regionalliga West	Regionalliga Berlin	Regionalliga Südwest	Regionalliga Süd
1963–64	FC St. Pauli	Alemannia Aachen	SC Tasmania 1900 Berlin	Borussia Neunkirchen	KSV Hessen Kassel
1964–65	Holstein Kiel	Borussia Mönchengladbach	Tennis Borussia Berlin	1. FC Saarbrücken	Bayern Munich
1965–66	FC St. Pauli	Fortuna Düsseldorf	Hertha BSC	FK Pirmasens	1. FC Schweinfurt 05
1966–67	Arminia Hannover	Alemannia Aachen	Hertha BSC	Borussia Neunkirchen	Kickers Offenbach
1967–68	Arminia Hannover	Bayer Leverkusen	Hertha BSC	SV Alsenborn	SpVgg Bayern Hof
1968–69	VfL Osnabrück	Rot-Weiss Oberhausen	Hertha Zehlendorf	SV Alsenborn	Karlsruher SC
1969–70	VfL Osnabrück	VfL Bochum	Hertha Zehlendorf	SV Alsenborn	Kickers Offenbach
1970–71	VfL Osnabrück	VfL Bochum	SC Tasmania 1900 Berlin	Borussia Neunkirchen	1. FC Nürnberg
1971–72	FC St. Pauli	Wuppertaler SV	SC Wacker 04 Berlin	Borussia Neunkirchen	Kickers Offenbach
1972–73	FC St. Pauli	Rot-Weiss Essen	Blau-Weiß 1890 Berlin	FSV Mainz 05	SV Darmstadt 98
1973–74	Eintracht Braunschweig	SG Wattenscheid 09	Tennis Borussia Berlin	Borussia Neunkirchen	FC Augsburg

=== 1994–2000 ===
Season	Regionalliga Nord	Regionalliga Nordost	Regionalliga West/Südwest	Regionalliga Süd
1994–95	VfB Lübeck	Carl Zeiss Jena	Arminia Bielefeld	SpVgg Unterhaching
1995–96	VfB Oldenburg	Tennis Borussia Berlin	FC Gütersloh	Stuttgarter Kickers
1996–97	Hannover 96	FC Energie Cottbus	SG Wattenscheid 09	1. FC Nürnberg
1997–98	Hannover 96	Tennis Borussia Berlin	Rot-Weiß Oberhausen	SSV Ulm 1846
1998–99	VfL Osnabrück	Chemnitzer FC	Alemannia Aachen	SV Waldhof Mannheim
1999–2000	VfL Osnabrück	1. FC Union Berlin	1. FC Saarbrücken	SSV Reutlingen 05

=== 2000–2008 ===
Season	Regionalliga Nord	Regionalliga Süd
2000–01	1. FC Union Berlin	Karlsruher SC
2001–02	VfB Lübeck	Wacker Burghausen
2002–03	Erzgebirge Aue	SpVgg Unterhaching
2003–04	Rot-Weiss Essen	Bayern Munich II
2004–05	Eintracht Braunschweig	Kickers Offenbach
2005–06	Rot-Weiss Essen	FC Augsburg
2006–07	FC St. Pauli	SV Wehen
2007–08	Rot Weiss Ahlen	FSV Frankfurt

=== 2008–2012 ===
Season	Regionalliga Nord	Regionalliga West	Regionalliga Süd
2008–09	Holstein Kiel	Borussia Dortmund II	1. FC Heidenheim
2009–10	SV Babelsberg 03	1. FC Saarbrücken	VfR Aalen
2010–11	Chemnitzer FC	Preußen Münster	SV Darmstadt 98
2011–12	Hallescher FC	Borussia Dortmund II	Stuttgarter Kickers

=== 2012–present ===
Season	Regionalliga Nord	Regionalliga Nordost	Regionalliga West	Regionalliga Südwest	Regionalliga Bayern
2012–13	Holstein Kiel	RB Leipzig	Sportfreunde Lotte	Hessen Kassel	1860 Munich II
2013–14	VfL Wolfsburg II	TSG Neustrelitz	SC Fortuna Köln	SG Sonnenhof Großaspach	Bayern Munich II
2014–15	Werder Bremen II	1. FC Magdeburg	Borussia Mönchengladbach II	Kickers Offenbach	Würzburger Kickers
2015–16	VfL Wolfsburg II	FSV Zwickau	Sportfreunde Lotte	SV Waldhof Mannheim	SSV Jahn Regensburg
2016–17	SV Meppen	Carl Zeiss Jena	FC Viktoria Köln	SV Elversberg	SpVgg Unterhaching
2017–18	SC Weiche Flensburg 08	Energie Cottbus	KFC Uerdingen 05	1. FC Saarbrücken	1860 Munich
2018–19	VfL Wolfsburg II	Chemnitzer FC	FC Viktoria Köln	SV Waldhof Mannheim	Bayern Munich II
2019–20	VfB Lübeck^{1}	Lokomotive Leipzig^{1}	SV Rödinghausen^{1}	1. FC Saarbrücken^{1}	(no champion)
2020–21	(no champion)	Viktoria Berlin^{1}	Borussia Dortmund II	SC Freiburg II	FC Schweinfurt^{2}
2021–22	VfB Oldenburg	BFC Dynamo	Rot-Weiss Essen	SV Elversberg	SpVgg Bayreuth
2022–23	VfB Lübeck	Energie Cottbus	Preußen Münster	SSV Ulm 1846	SpVgg Unterhaching
2023–24	Hannover 96 II	Energie Cottbus	Alemannia Aachen	VfB Stuttgart II	Würzburger Kickers
2024–25	TSV Havelse	Lokomotive Leipzig	MSV Duisburg	TSG Hoffenheim II	FC Schweinfurt
2025–26	SV Meppen	Lokomotive Leipzig	Fortuna Köln	Sonnenhof Großaspach	1. FC Nürnberg II

^{1} Awarded on points-per-game basis after season was not completed
^{2} Play-off winner
