= Lower Rhine Football Association =

- Fußballverband Niederrhein
- Abbreviation: FVN
- Formation: 18 January 1947
- Type: Football association
- Headquarters: Friedrich-Alfred-Straße 10
- Location: Duisburg, Germany
- Members: 400,988 (2017)
- President: Peter Frymuth
- Parent organization: German Football Association
- Website: fvn.de

The Lower Rhine Football Association (German: Fußballverband Niederrhein, FVN) is the umbrella organization of football clubs in the German Lower Rhine region, and comprises 14 football districts. The FVN was founded in 1947 and has its headquarters in Duisburg. President of the FVN is Peter Frymuth.

The FVN belongs to the Western German Football Association and is one of 21 state organizations of the German Football Association (German: Deutscher Fussball-Bund – DFB).

In 2017 the FVN had 400,988 members from 1,234 football clubs with 9,816 teams.

The FVN has been provider of the Sportschule Wedau in Duisburg since 1978. Here sports courses are carried out and coaches and referees are trained. On top of that the Sportschule Wedau serves as a community center. Holiday camps for children and adolescents are regularly held here.
