= 2008–09 Regionalliga =

1st season of the Regionalliga

Regionalliga
- Season: 2008–09
- Champions: Holstein Kiel (N); Borussia Dortmund II (W); 1. FC Heidenheim 1846 (S)
- Relegated: FC Altona 93; FC Sachsen Leipzig; FC Energie Cottbus II; FSV Oggersheim; BV Cloppenburg; 1. FC Kleve; Viktoria Aschaffenburg; TSV Großbardorf; SpVgg Unterhaching II

The 2008–09 Regionalliga season was the first season of the Regionalliga at tier four of the German football league system and the 15th overall since re-establishment of the league in 1994. It was contested in three regional divisions of eighteen teams in each. The champions, Holstein Kiel, Borussia Dortmund II and 1. FC Heidenheim 1846 were promoted to the 3. Liga.

== Team Movements ==
=== Teams Promoted from Regionalliga ===
==== To 2. Bundesliga ====
===== From Nord =====
- Rot-Weiß Ahlen (Nord Champions)
- Rot-Weiß Oberhausen (Nord Runners-Up)

===== From Süd =====
- FSV Frankfurt (Süd Champions)
- FC Ingolstadt 04 (Süd Runners-Up)

==== To 3. Liga ====
===== From Nord =====
- Fortuna Düsseldorf
- 1. FC Union Berlin
- SV Werder Bremen II
- Wuppertaler SV
- Rot-Weiß Erfurt
- Dynamo Dresden
- Kickers Emden
- Eintracht Braunschweig

===== From Süd =====
- VfB Stuttgart II
- VfR Aalen
- SV Sandhausen
- SpVgg Unterhaching
- SV Wacker Burghausen
- FC Bayern München II
- SSV Jahn Regensburg
- Stuttgarter Kickers

=== Teams promoted from the Oberliga ===
==== To Nord ====
===== From NOFV-Oberliga Nord =====
- Hertha BSC II
- Hansa Rostock II
- Türkiyemspor Berlin

===== From NOFV-Oberliga Süd =====
- Hallescher FC
- Chemnitzer FC
- VFC Plauen
- FC Sachsen Leipzig (Note: FC Sachsen Leipzig beat NOFV-Oberliga Nord side Greifswalder SV 04 in play-off to earn promotion)

===== From Oberliga Nord =====
- Holstein Kiel
- Altona 93
- SV Wilhelmshaven
- Hannover 96 II
- FC Oberneuland (Note: FC Oberneuland won a round of promotion against 1 fellow side from Oberliga Nord (VfB Oldenburg) and 3 sides from Niedersachsenliga West (VfL Oldenburg), Hamburg-Liga (SC Victoria Hamburg) and Niedersachsenliga Ost (MTV Gifhorn))

==== To West ====
===== From Oberliga Nord =====
- BV Cloppenburg

===== From Oberliga Westfalen =====
- Preußen Münster
- FC Schalke 04 II
- VfL Bochum II
- Sportfreunde Lotte

===== From Oberliga Nordrhein =====
- Borussia Mönchengladbach II
- Bayer Leverkusen II
- 1. FC Köln II
- 1. FC Kleve

===== From Oberliga Südwest =====
- 1. FSV Mainz 05 II
- 1. FC Kaiserslautern II
- Wormatia Worms
- Eintracht Trier

==== To Süd ====
===== From Oberliga Baden-Württemberg =====
- SC Freiburg II
- SSV Ulm 1846
- Waldhof Mannheim
- 1. FC Heidenheim

===== From Bayernliga =====
- SpVgg Greuther Fürth II
- 1. FC Nürnberg II
- TSV Großbardorf
- 1. FC Eintracht Bamberg (Note: 1. FC Eintracht Bamberg were promoted due to SpVgg Bayreuth being barred from promotion)
- SpVgg Unterhaching II

===== From Hessenliga =====
- SV Darmstadt 98
- SV Wehen Wiesbaden II
- Viktoria Aschaffenburg
- Eintracht Frankfurt II

== Regionalligas ==
=== Regionalliga Nord ===
Pos	Team	Pld	W	D	L	GF	GA	GD	Pts	Promotion or relegation
1	Holstein Kiel (C, P)	34	21	10	3	54	22	+32	73	Promotion to 3. Liga
2	Hallescher FC	34	19	13	2	43	20	+23	70	
3	SV Babelsberg 03	34	17	12	5	46	25	+21	63	
4	1. FC Magdeburg	34	17	8	9	50	36	+14	59	
5	VfL Wolfsburg II	34	15	8	11	53	35	+18	53	
6	Hannover 96 II	34	14	7	13	48	42	+6	49	
7	Chemnitzer FC	34	11	12	11	50	42	+8	45	
8	VfB Lübeck	34	10	15	9	38	34	+4	45	
9	FC Oberneuland	34	12	8	14	40	41	−1	44	
10	Hansa Rostock II	34	12	7	15	53	59	−6	43	
11	SV Wilhelmshaven	34	12	7	15	45	52	−7	43	
12	Hertha BSC II	34	11	10	13	40	55	−15	43	
13	Hamburger SV II	34	11	9	14	44	43	+1	42	
14	VFC Plauen	34	10	12	12	52	54	−2	42	
15	Türkiyemspor Berlin (Note: Türkiyemspor Berlin were spared from relegation due to Kickers Emden voluntarily entering the Oberliga after withdrawing from the 3rd Liga.)	34	12	6	16	36	43	−7	42	
16	Altona 93 (R)	34	8	7	19	40	66	−26	31	Relegation to Oberliga
17	Sachsen Leipzig (R)	34	5	9	20	21	54	−33	24	Relegation to Oberliga
18	Energie Cottbus II (R)	34	5	8	21	23	53	−30	23	Relegation to Oberliga

Source: Weltfussball.de
Rules for classification: 1) points; 2) goal difference; 3) number of goals scored.
(C) Champions; (P) Promoted; (R) Relegated

==== Top scorers ====
Pos	Player	Team	Goals
1	(Germany) Wojciech Pollok	SV Wilhelmshaven	22
2	(Serbia) Radovan Vujanovic	1. FC Magdeburg	20

Source: Weltfussball.de

=== Regionalliga West ===
Pos	Team	Pld	W	D	L	GF	GA	GD	Pts	Promotion or relegation
1	Borussia Dortmund II (C, P)	34	21	5	8	86	49	+37	68	Promotion to 3. Liga
2	1. FC Kaiserslautern II	34	19	8	7	59	42	+17	65	
3	1. FC Köln II	34	16	12	6	53	34	+19	60	
4	Preußen Münster	34	14	11	9	51	36	+15	53	
5	1. FSV Mainz 05 II	34	15	7	12	58	45	+13	52	
6	Bor. Mönchengladbach II	34	14	9	11	50	49	+1	51	
7	Rot-Weiss Essen	34	13	10	11	61	41	+20	49	
8	SC Verl	34	13	10	11	45	42	+3	49	
9	Bayer Leverkusen II	34	14	7	13	53	56	−3	49	
10	Sportfreunde Lotte	34	14	7	13	53	57	−4	49	
11	SV 07 Elversberg	34	11	13	10	39	37	+2	46	
12	FSV Oggersheim (Note: Wormatia were spared from relegation due to Oggersheim withdrawing from the league because of financial problems.) (R)	34	11	9	14	43	58	−15	42	Relegation to Oberliga
13	Eintracht Trier	34	11	8	15	37	51	−14	41	
14	VfL Bochum II	34	11	7	16	51	59	−8	40	
15	FC Schalke 04 II	34	10	9	15	41	54	−13	39	
16	Wormatia Worms	34	8	9	17	39	55	−16	33	
17	BV Cloppenburg (R)	34	8	4	22	51	76	−25	28	Relegation to Oberliga
18	1. FC Kleve (R)	34	6	9	19	44	73	−29	27	Relegation to Oberliga

Source: Weltfussball.de
Rules for classification: 1) points; 2) goal difference; 3) number of goals scored.
(C) Champions; (P) Promoted; (R) Relegated

==== Top scorers ====
Pos	Player	Team	Goals
1	(Germany) Sascha Mölders	Rot-Weiss Essen	28
2	(Germany) Christopher Kullmann	Borussia Dortmund II	19
3	(Turkey) Alper Akcam	1. FC Kaiserslautern II	17

Source: Weltfussball.de

=== Regionalliga Süd (South) ===
Pos	Team	Pld	W	D	L	GF	GA	GD	Pts	Promotion or relegation
1	1. FC Heidenheim 1846 (C, P)	34	22	6	6	61	37	+24	72	Promotion to 3. Liga
2	Hessen Kassel	34	22	5	7	75	33	+42	71	
3	Eintracht Frankfurt II	34	19	9	6	61	35	+26	66	
4	Waldhof Mannheim	34	19	6	9	54	30	+24	63	
5	1. FC Nürnberg II	34	17	10	7	65	37	+28	61	
6	TSV 1860 München II	34	16	7	11	59	42	+17	55	
7	SSV Ulm 1846	34	13	14	7	55	35	+20	53	
8	SC Pfullendorf	34	14	8	12	50	48	+2	50	
9	SV Wehen Wiesbaden II	34	15	4	15	40	37	+3	49	
10	1. FC Eintracht Bamberg	34	12	8	14	50	61	−11	44	
11	SpVgg Greuther Fürth II	34	10	11	13	37	39	−2	41	
12	SSV Reutlingen	34	10	10	14	41	55	−14	40	
13	Viktoria Aschaffenburg (Note: Karlsruher SC II were spared from relegation due to Viktoria Aschaffenburg withdrawing from the League because of financial problems.) (R)	34	9	12	13	38	46	−8	39	Relegation to Oberliga
14	SC Freiburg II	34	11	5	18	46	63	−17	38	
15	SV Darmstadt 98	34	9	10	15	44	54	−10	37	
16	Karlsruher SC II	34	10	4	20	37	66	−29	34	
17	TSV Großbardorf (R)	34	4	6	24	32	84	−52	18	Relegation to Oberliga
18	SpVgg Unterhaching II (R)	34	4	5	25	35	78	−43	17	Relegation to Oberliga

Source: Weltfussball.de
Rules for classification: 1) points; 2) goal difference; 3) number of goals scored.
(C) Champions; (P) Promoted; (R) Relegated

==== Top scorers ====
Pos	Player	Club	Goals
1	(Germany) Thorsten Bauer	Hessen Kassel	32
2	(Turkey) Ahmet Kulabas	1. FC Nürnberg II	18
3	(Germany) Peter Heyer	1. FC Eintracht Bamberg	17
	(Germany) Dieter Jarosch	1. FC Heidenheim 1846	17

Source:Weltfussball.de
