= Westphalian Football and Athletics Association =

- Fußball- und Leichtathletik-Verband Westfalen
- Abbreviation: FLVW
- Formation: 1946/1954
- Type: Football association
- Headquarters: Jakob-Koenen-Str. 2
- Location: Kamen, Germany
- Members: 946,502 (2017)
- President: Gundolf Walaschewski
- Parent organization: German Football Association
- Website: flvw.de

The Westphalia Football and Athletics Association (German: Fußball- und Leichtathletik-Verband Westfalen, FLVW) is the umbrella organization of football and athletics clubs in the German Westphalia area, and comprises 29 districts. The FLVW was created in 1954 through the merger of the Football Association of Westphalia, founded in 1946, with the Athletics Association of Westphalia. The FLVW has its headquarters in Kamen. President of the FLVW is Gundolf Walaschewski.

The FLVW belongs to the Western German Football Association and is one of 21 state organizations of the German Football Association (German: Deutscher Fussball-Bund – DFB).

In 2017, the FLVW had 946,502 members from 2,201 football clubs with 17,309 teams.

The FLVW is provider of the Sportschule Kaiserau in Kamen.
