= Peter Frymuth =

German football official (born 1956)

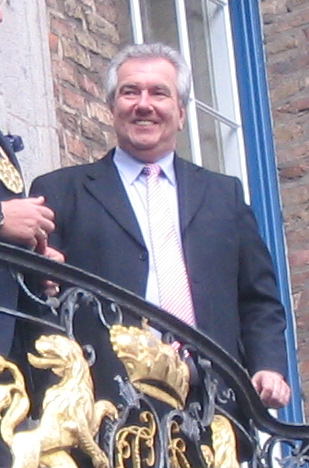
- Born: 14 December 1956 (age 69); Düsseldorf
- Title: Vice president of the German Football Association
- Term: 2013–present

Peter Frymuth (born 14 December 1956 in Düsseldorf) is a German football official. He is currently vice president of the German Football Association (German: Deutscher Fussball-Bund, DFB) and president of the Lower Rhine Football Association (German: Fußballverband Niederrhein, FVN).

== Career ==
As early as the 1970s, Frymuth already had various functions in the Lower Rhine Football Association and the Western German Football and Athletics Association (German:Westdeutscher Fußball- und Leichtathletikverband, WFLV). In December 2006, he was awarded the Federal Cross of Merit for his volunteer activities in youth and amateur football. In 2013, Frymuth was elected president of FVN and vice president of the WFLV.

From November 2004 to January 2014, Frymuth was CEO of Fortuna Düsseldorf. During this period, the club consolidated financially and rose from the 3. Liga to the Bundesliga. In 2014, he was named Düsseldorfer of the year in the category sports for his services.

Since October 25, 2013, he has been vice president and member of the DFB presidium. He is responsible for "league operations and football development".

Frymuth works full-time as head of district administration in the Düsseldorf district Eller.

== Personal ==
Frymuth comes from Düsseldorf-Lohausen. In his youth he played football at Lohausener SV. He is married and has two children.
