= Jesse Weißenfels =

German footballer

Personal information
- Date of birth: 26 May 1992 (age 34)
- Place of birth: Wesel, Germany
- Height: 1.85 m (6 ft 1 in)
- Position: Centre-forward

Team information
- Current team: VfB Homberg
- Number: 11

Youth career
- 1996–2003: SV Ginderich
- 2003–2006: PSV Wesel-Lackhausen
- 2006–2011: Borussia Mönchengladbach

Senior career*
Years	Team	Apps	(Gls)
2011–2013	Borussia Mönchengladbach II	5	(0)
2013–2014	SV Sonsbeck	20	(19)
2014	Schalke 04 II	10	(2)
2014–2015	Sportfreunde Lotte	33	(20)
2015–2016	Preußen Münster	13	(2)
2017–2018	Stuttgarter Kickers	35	(12)
2018–2020	Waldhof Mannheim	9	(0)
2020–2022	SSVg Velbert	28	(9)
2022–	VfB Homberg	9	(1)
- * Club domestic league appearances and goals as of 13 November 2022

Jesse Weißenfels (born 26 May 1992) is a German footballer who plays as a centre-forward for VfB Homberg.
