= Ahmet Kulabas =

Turkish-German footballer

Personal information
- Date of birth: October 8, 1987 (age 39)
- Place of birth: Esslingen, West Germany
- Position: Striker

Team information
- Current team: Boluspor

Youth career
- VfL Stuttgart Wangen
- –2006: Stuttgarter Kickers

Senior career*
| Years | Team | Apps | (Gls) |
| 2006–2010 | 1. FC Nuremberg II | 118 | (43) |
| 2010–2011 | 1. FC Heidenheim | 4 | (0) |
| 2011–2012 | Eintracht Trier | 49 | (20) |
| 2012–2014 | Wacker Burghausen | 48 | (5) |
| 2014– | Boluspor | 7 | (1) |
| 2015 | → Altay Izmir (loan) | 2 | (0) |
- * Club domestic league appearances and goals as of 4 July 2015

Ahmet Kulabas (born October 8, 1987) is a Turkish-German footballer who is currently playing for Boluspor.
