= Wojciech Pollok =

Polish-German footballer

Personal information
- Date of birth: 25 June 1982 (age 44)
- Place of birth: Pyskowice, Poland
- Height: 1.81 m (5 ft 11 in)
- Position: Forward

Senior career*
| Years | Team | Apps | (Gls) |
| 2001–2003 | SG Wattenscheid 09 II | 43 | (3) |
| 2003–2004 | SC Hassel | 29 | (3) |
| 2004–2005 | SV Lippstadt | 34 | (21) |
| 2005–2006 | Borussia Dortmund II | 31 | (9) |
| 2006–2007 | Kickers Emden | 19 | (3) |
| 2007–2008 | Bonner SC | 31 | (19) |
| 2008–2009 | SV Wilhelmshaven | 33 | (22) |
| 2009–2011 | Preußen Münster | 47 | (16) |
| 2011–2012 | Eintracht Trier | 14 | (1) |
| 2012–2013 | Sportfreunde Siegen | 11 | (1) |
| 2013 | → SV Wilhelmshaven (loan) | 15 | (4) |
| 2013–2016 | SC Wiedenbrück 2000 | 23 | (2) |
- * Club domestic league appearances and goals

Wojciech Pollok (born 25 June 1982) is a Polish-German former professional footballer who played as a forward.
