= Ercan Aydogmus =

Turkish footballer

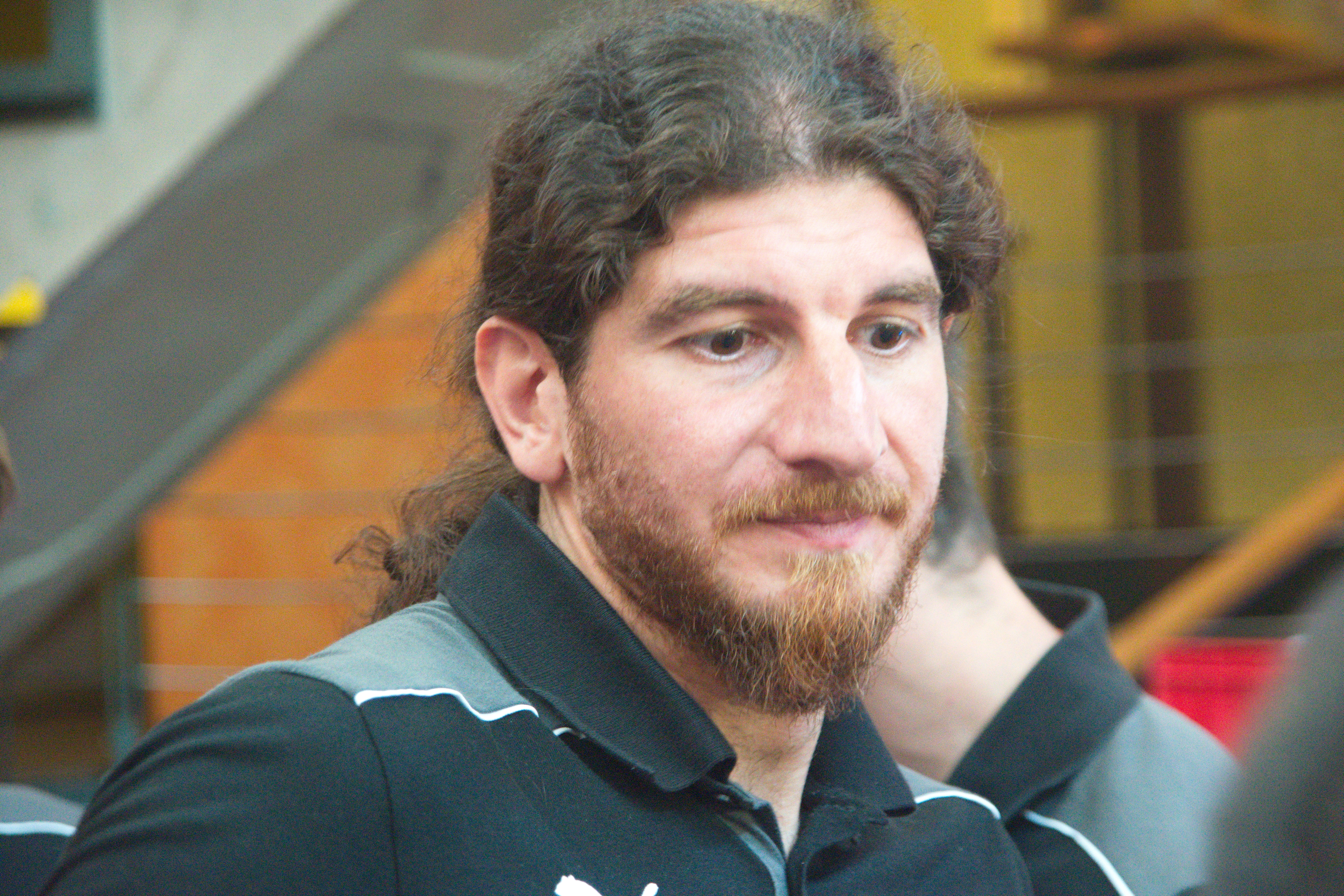
- Aydogmus in 2016

Personal information
- Date of birth: 22 August 1979 (age 47)
- Place of birth: Sivas, Turkey
- Height: 1.88 m (6 ft 2 in)
- Position: Striker

Youth career
- MSV Duisburg

Senior career*
Years	Team	Apps	(Gls)
–2001	VfB Homberg		
2001–2005	SV Straelen		
2005–2008	VfB Homberg	87	(41)
2008–2010	Bonner SC	65	(37)
2010–2011	Sportfreunde Lotte	13	(1)
2011–2013	Viktoria Köln	46	(17)
2013–2015	Fortuna Köln	61	(21)
2015–2017	Wuppertaler SV	52	(22)
2017–2018	SV Scherpenberg		
2018	Genc Osman Duisburg		
2018–2019	Cronenberger SC		
2020	VfB Speldorf		
- * Club domestic league appearances and goals

Ercan Aydogmus (born 22 August 1979) is a Turkish former professional footballer who played as a striker.

In the summer of 2010, Aydoğmuş signed a contract with Sportfreunde Lotte. After only one season he moved to Viktoria Köln in the fifth league. Promotion to the Western Regional League was achieved immediately. With 16 goals, Aydoğmuş was Cologne's second best scorer behind Mike Wunderlich.

In the summer of 2013 his signing for SC Fortuna Colonia was announced, in the 2013/14 season he achieved promotion to the 3rd league with Fortuna; He was Fortuna's top scorer in the season with 18 goals. He made his professional debut in the third league on July 27, 2014, on the first matchday, in a 1–2 loss against SG Sonnenhof Großaspach. With Fortuna he managed to remain in the league at the end of the season, to which Aydoğmuş contributed with three goals. In the summer of 2015 he moved to Oberliga side Wuppertaler SV. There he managed to win the title and be promoted to the Regionalliga West in his first season. However, in the second season it seemed that he would have to end his sports career after a serious injury to the cartilage in his knee.

In mid-January 2018, his move to the regional league team SV Genc Osman Duisburg was announced, with which he was promoted to the regional league at the end of the season. For the 2018/19 season, he was signed by Cronenberger SC, who were relegated to the Oberliga, and scored 42 goals in 35 regional league games to help them gain direct promotion. During the 2019/20 winter break, Aydoğmuş moved to relegation-threatened regional league team VfB Speldorf.

Since July 2022, Aydoğmuş has been searching for goals in the A/Moers regional league for TuS Asterlagen.The club was promoted to the district league in its first season. Since the 2023/2024 season, Aydoğmuş has a contract with SV Heißen as a coach in the district league A (Group 1, Duisburg, Mülheim and Dinslaken), thus occupying his first coaching position.
