= FSV Oggersheim =

German football club

- Full name: FSV 1913 Ludwigshafen-Oggersheim
- Founded: 1913
- Ground: Südweststadion
- Capacity: 6,500
- Chairman: Horst Loch
- Manager: Karsten Metzger
- League: B-Klasse Rhein-Pfalz Süd (XI)
- 2015–16: 15th
| Home colours | Away colours |

FSV 1913 Ludwigshafen-Oggersheim is a German association football club based in the Oggersheim district of Ludwigshafen, Rhineland-Palatinate. The club advanced to the Regionalliga Süd (III) following an Oberliga (IV) title win in 2007, but found itself overmatched at that level of competition. After struggling through two poor seasons and in increasing financial difficulty, they withdrew to 11th tier local level play in 2010–11.

== History ==
The club was established in 1913 as VfR 1913 Oggersheim and in 1937 merged with SC Eintracht Oggersheim, which had been formed in 1924 as the football department of the gymnastics club Vereinigten Turnerschaft Oggersheim, to create SpVgg Oggersheim. The following year, all of the area clubs were reorganized into a single association known as Gemeinschaft für Leibesübungen Oggersheim.

In the aftermath of World War II, occupying Allied authorities ordered the dissolution of all organizations in the country, including sports and football clubs, as part of the process of denazification. A new association was formed as ASV Oggersheim in 1945 and its football department became independent in 1949 as Fussball Sportverein Oggersheim. The footballers played as a lower tier lower side until winning their way to the third tier Amateurliga Südwest for a single season in 1963–64. FSV made a DFB-Pokal (German Cup) appearance in 1978, going out in the first round 0:3 to 1. FC Kaiserslautern in the opening round.

A 1992 Landesliga Ost (VI) title led to promotion to the Verbandsliga Südwest (V), where the club remained for five seasons before being relegated again. In 2004, FSV returned to the Verbandsliga, followed by a further promotion two years later to the Oberliga Südwest (IV). After only two seasons in this league, the club won promotion to the Regionalliga Süd (III) in 2007. They finished in last place in 2007–08, but avoided being sent down when the league was restructured, instead becoming part of the Regionalliga West (III) in 2008–09. Despite an improved performance and a 12th-place result, the club decided to withdraw from the league.

After struggling financially, FSV made a fresh start in the 11th tier 1. Kreisklasse Rheinpfalz Süd in 2010–11 and earned a second-place result there in 2011–12. In 2013 this league was renamed B-Klasse Rhein-Pfalz Süd.

== Honours ==
The club's honours:

- Oberliga Südwest (IV)
  - Champions: 2007
- Verbandsliga Südwest (V)
  - Champions: 2005

== Recent seasons ==
The recent season-by-season performance of the club:

| Season | Division | Tier | Position |
|---|---|---|---|
| 2003–04 | Landesliga Südwest-Ost | VI | 2nd ↑ |
| 2004–05 | Verbandsliga Südwest | V | 1st ↑ |
| 2005–06 | Oberliga Südwest | IV | 6th |
| 2006–07 | Oberliga Südwest | IV | 1st ↑ |
| 2007–08 | Regionalliga Süd | III | 18th |
| 2008–09 | Regionalliga West | IV | 12th ↓ |
| 2009–10 | Verbandsliga Südwest | VI | withdrawn |
| 2010–11 | 1. Kreisklasse Rheinpfalz Süd | XI | 16th |
| 2011–12 | 1. Kreisklasse Rheinpfalz Süd | XI | 2nd |
| 2012–13 | 1. Kreisklasse Rheinpfalz Süd | XI | 6th |
| 2013–14 | B-Klasse Rhein-Pfalz Süd | XI | 2nd |
| 2014–15 | B-Klasse Rhein-Pfalz Süd | XI | 15th |
| 2015–16 | B-Klasse Rhein-Pfalz Süd | XI | 15th |
| 2016–17 | B-Klasse Rhein-Pfalz Süd | XI | |

- With the introduction of the Regionalligas in 1994 and the 3. Liga in 2008 as the new third tier, below the 2. Bundesliga, all leagues below dropped one tier. In 2012 the Oberliga Südwest was renamed Oberliga Rheinland-Pfalz/Saar.

| ↑ Promoted | ↓ Relegated |
