= Christian Knappmann =

German footballer

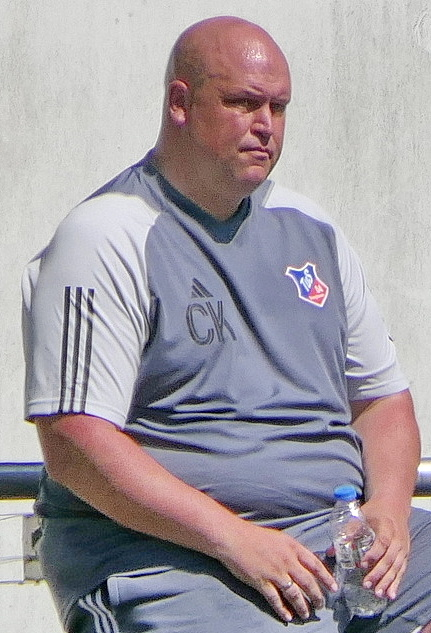
- Christian Knappmann, 2023

Personal information
- Date of birth: 19 March 1981 (age 45)
- Place of birth: Düsseldorf, West Germany
- Position: Forward

Youth career
- Fortuna Düsseldorf
- Wuppertaler SV
- Borussia Mönchengladbach
- Ratinger SV
- TuRu Düsseldorf

Senior career*
Years	Team	Apps	(Gls)
2000–2001	FC Remscheid	11	(0)
2001–2002	Germania Ratingen	30	(7)
2002–2004	Kickers Offenbach	39	(8)
2004	VfR Neumünster	15	(4)
2004–2005	TuS Koblenz	13	(2)
2005–2007	KFC Uerdingen	49	(19)
2007	FC Gütersloh	21	(15)
2007–2008	KFC Uerdingen	13	(4)
2008–2010	SC Verl	75	(25)
2010–2011	Rot Weiss Ahlen	15	(0)
2011	Wacker Burghausen	19	(5)
2011–2013	Wuppertaler SV	55	(42)
2013	Borussia Dortmund II	16	(0)
2013–2014	Rot-Weiss Essen	15	(5)
2014–2015	SV Rödinghausen	14	(3)
2015	TSV Havelse	4	(1)
2015–2016	SC Westfalia Herne		

Managerial career
- 2015: TSV Havelse (playing assistant)
- 2016–2021: SC Westfalia Herne
- * Club domestic league appearances and goals

Christian Knappmann (born 19 March 1981) is a German former professional footballer who played as a forward
