= Western German Football Association =

Regional association of the German Football Association

- Westdeutscher Fußballverband
- Abbreviation: WDFV
- Formation: 1898 / 1947
- Type: Football association
- Location: Duisburg, Germany
- Members: 1,711,740 (2017)
- President: Hermann Korfmacher
- Parent organization: German Football Association
- Affiliations: Middle Rhine Football Association; Lower Rhine Football Association; Westphalia Football and Athletics Association
- Website: www.wdfv.de

The Western German Football Association (German: Westdeutscher Fußballverband; WDFV) is one of the five regional associations of the German Football Association (German: Deutscher Fußball-Bund; DFB) and covers the German state of North Rhine-Westphalia.

== Structure ==
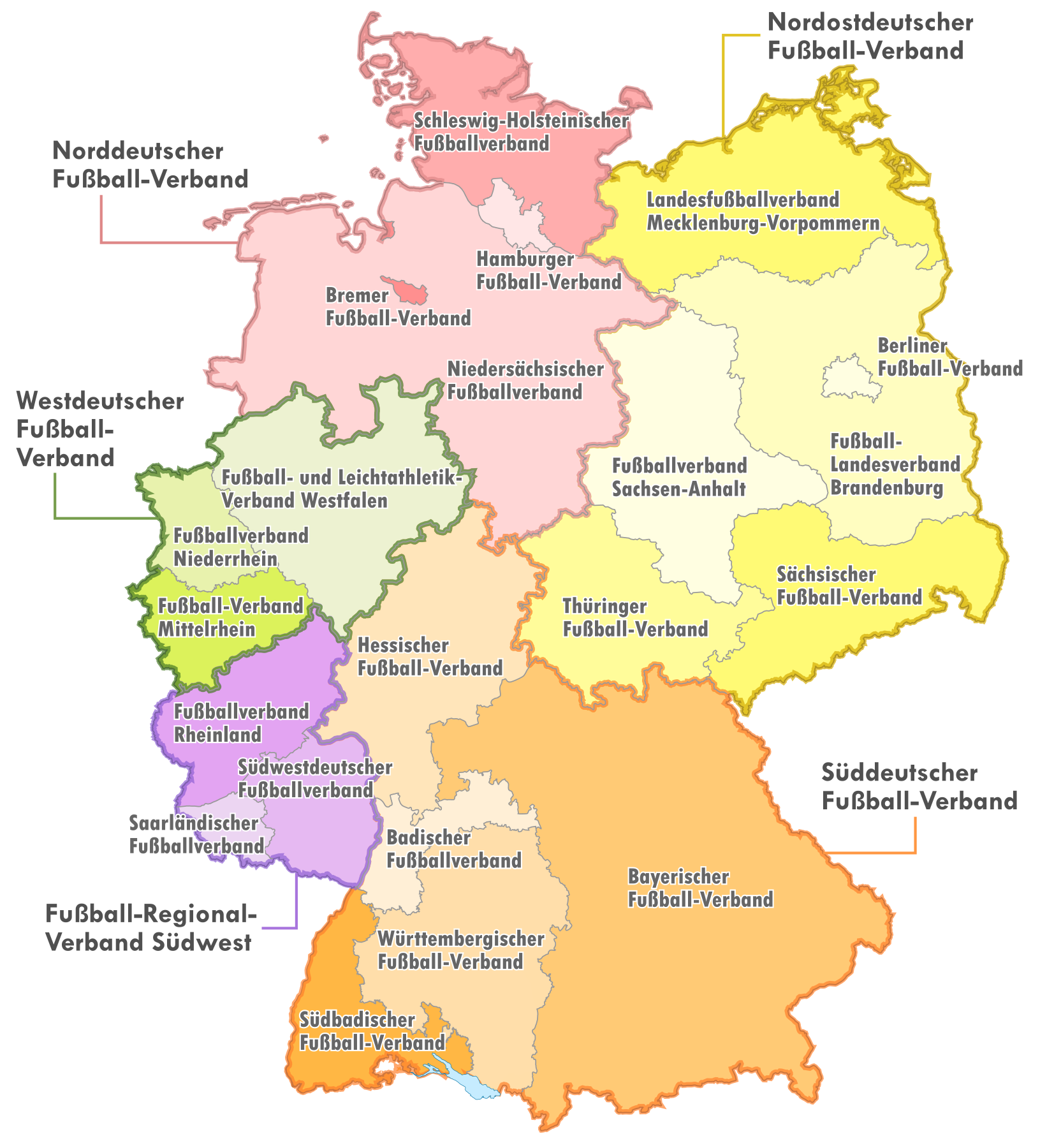
DFB, its five regional and 21 state associations

In 2017, the WDFV football department had 1,711,740 members, 4,561 member clubs and 35,141 teams playing in all its men, women and junior league systems, making it the second largest of the five regional associations of DFB. Since the 2012–13 season, at the top of the WDFV men's league system sits the Regionalliga West, a level four division in the German football league system.

The WDFV itself is formed by the following state associations (football departments only):

- Lower Rhine Football Association (German: Fußball-Verband Niederrhein; FVN)
- Middle Rhine Football Association (German: Fußball-Verband Mittelrhein; FVM)
- Westphalia Football and Athletics Association (German: Fußball- und Leichtathletikverband Westfalen; FLVW)

President of the association is Hermann Korfmacher who is also President of the Westphalia Football and Athletics Association.

== History ==
The history of the WDFV dates back to 1898 with the foundation of the Rhineland local Rheinischer Spiel-Verband, then following several mergers with other local football associations in western Germany. It used to administer the Western German football championship for the next decades. In 1933, the association along with all other regional associations was disbanded by the Nazi government, with all German football competitions now organized – by the Reich. Soon after World War II, football competitions in western Germany typically restarted on an informal basis, with the association officially reintroduced in 1947. Until 1963, it had the jurisdiction on the Oberliga West, the regional division of the former lop level German Oberliga. After the introduction of the Bundesliga in 1963, the association's league system became a feeder to the nationwide divisions. In 2002, the football department merged with the Athletics Association of the North Rhine and was known as Western German Football and Athletics Association (Westdeutscher Fußball- und Leichtathletik Verband) until August 2016 when the WFLV took its present name after the two associations separated.

The association has been operating an educational institute with a focus on sports since 1977. Target groups are the volunteers working in the football and athletics clubs in the country. The qualifications center is intended for all volunteer officials in organized sports of the WDFV and its other association members. Bases for the courses are the Sportschule Wedau in Duisburg, the Sportschule Kaiserau in Kamen and the Sportschule Hennef.
