= Introduction of the 2. Bundesliga =

1974 creation of German football league

The Introduction of the 2. Bundesliga was the step of establishing a professional second tier association football league in Germany in 1974. The new league, the 2. Bundesliga, played its first season in 1974–75 and continues to be the second-highest league in the country. Its introduction reduced the number of second divisions in Germany from five to two and the number of teams at this level from 83 to 40. It eliminated the necessity of having a promotion round at the end of the season to determine the two teams promoted to the Bundesliga.

== History ==
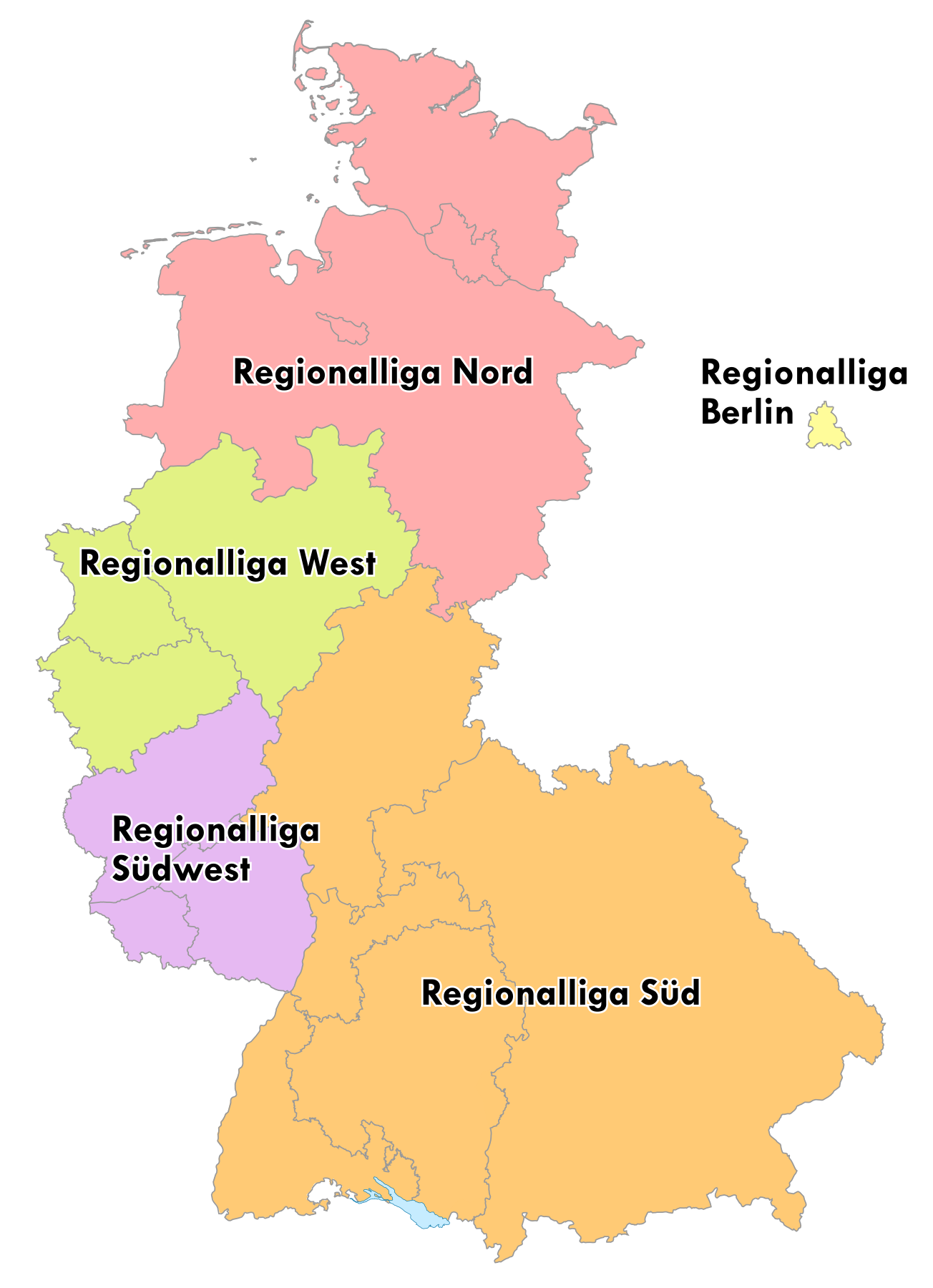
Map of the five German Regionalligas from 1963 to 1974.

Germany's second tier of football, the Regionalliga, had been established in 1963 with the introduction of the Bundesliga. The Regionalliga was played in five regional divisions, North, West, South, South-West and Berlin. This arrangement however meant that, to determine the two teams that would be promoted to the Bundesliga at the end of each season, a promotion play-off had to be held after the end of the regular league season. These play-offs were originally made up of the five Regionalliga champions and runners-up, except for Berlin, where only the champions qualified from. Later, the Berlin runners-up was admitted, too. Clubs relegated from the Bundesliga experienced a drop from a nationwide professional league to semi-professional and financially unattractive regional leagues.

The decision to establish a 2. Bundesliga with two regional divisions made up of 20 teams each, North and South, was made at the annual convention of the German Football Association, the DFB, at Frankfurt on 30 June 1973. For the new northern division, eleven clubs from the west, seven clubs from the north and two clubs from Berlin were meant to qualify however, only one club from Berlin took up the option, leaving another spot for the west. For the new southern division, seven clubs from the south-west and 13 clubs from the south qualified. The two teams relegated from the Bundesliga, Hannover 96 and SC Fortuna Köln, were deducted from the quota of the region they belonged to.

== The qualifying process for the 2. Bundesliga ==
=== Qualifying system ===
The qualifying system took into account the last five seasons of the Regionalliga, whereby points were awarded for final placings. The last placed team in each season received one point, the second last two and so on up to the league champions which received points equal to the number of teams in the league. The points for the last season, 1973–74, where multiplied by three, the points for the previous two doubled and the points for the first two counted just single. Clubs that played in the Bundesliga in any of those five seasons received 25 points per season, which were also multiplied according to the before mentioned modus, depending which season they played in the Bundesliga. Clubs that played below the Regionalliga in any of the five season received no points for those seasons. Only clubs that played in the Regionalliga or Bundesliga in the 1973–74 season could qualify for the new league. Regionalliga clubs that finished on a relegation rank in 1973–74 were also barred from qualifying. If two clubs where on equal points overall the final placing of 1973–74 was taken to determine who ranked higher.

=== 2. Bundesliga Nord ===
Twenty teams from three different leagues qualified for the northern division.

==== From the Regionalliga Nord ====
Eintracht Braunschweig, the last champions of the Regionalliga Nord and the team with the most points in the five-year ranking for the league won promotion to the Bundesliga in 1974. In turn, Hannover 96, a northern club, was relegated form the Bundesliga to the new 2. Bundesliga. The next two qualified clubs, FC St. Pauli and VfL Osnabrück had been strong performers in the league over the years, with both winning seven league championships between them. Of the remaining qualified sides, VfL Wolfsburg had been a top side in the league in its eleven years of existence, too. HSV Barmbeck-Uhlenhorst had been on the rise only since 1970 while 1. SC Göttingen 05 had slowly been declining in results since 1968. Finally, Olympia Wilhelmshaven qualified as somewhat of an outsider. Of the established teams that failed to qualify Holstein Kiel and Arminia Hannover had both played in the league in every season and also won league championships. TuS 93 Bremerhaven and VfB Lübeck had also played in the league in every season but generally been less successful.

The points table:

Rank	Club	Points 1969 to 1974	Place in 1973–74
1	Eintracht Braunschweig	207	1
2	FC St Pauli	157	2
3	VfL Osnabrück	154	3
4	VfL Wolfsburg	138	4
5	HSV Barmbeck-Uhlenhorst	125	5
6	1. SC Göttingen 05	107	12
7	Olympia Wilhelmshaven	91	7
8	Holstein Kiel	91	13
9	VfB Lübeck	91	16
10	SV Arminia Hannover	78	9
11	VfL Oldenburg	69	6
12	TuS Bremerhaven 93	59	14
13	SV Meppen	55	8
14	Heider SV	50	15
15	1. FC Phönix Lübeck	50	19
16	OSV Hannover	47	11
17	Itzehoer SV	34	17
18	SC Concordia Hamburg	31	10
19	VfL Pinneberg	6	18

==== From the Regionalliga West ====
Eleven clubs qualified from the Regionalliga West for the new 2. Bundesliga, with a twelfth club, Fortuna Köln, entering the new league after being relegated from the Bundesliga. Of the teams qualified for the league only Schwarz-Weiß Essen had played every season in the Regionalliga while SG Wattenscheid 09, Rot-Weiß Oberhausen and Alemannia Aachen had previously won the league. Bayer Uerdingen, with three seasons, and 1. FC Mülheim-Styrum, with two, had been relatively new to the Regionalliga, while Preußen Münster, Borussia Dortmund and Arminia Bielefeld had been former Bundesliga sides. DJK Gütersloh and SpVgg Erkenschwick had only competed in the league during the five year qualifying period but consistent results in this time meant the two clubs qualified, too. Of the clubs that missed out Viktoria Köln and Westfalia Herne had been stronger clubs in the Oberliga area, failed to make an impression in the Regionalliga but would, in the coming years, still earn promotion to the 2. Bundesiga.

The points table:

Rank	Club	Points 1969 to 1974	Place in 1973–74
1	Rot-Weiß Oberhausen	201	2
2	Borussia Dortmund	169	6
3	Alemannia Aachen	130	7
4	Arminia Bielefeld	123	14
5	SG Wattenscheid 09	113	1
6	Bayer 05 Uerdingen	104	3
7	Schwarz-Weiß Essen	97	8
8	Preußen Münster	92	5
9	DJK Gütersloh	82	9
10	SpVgg Erkenschwick	76	11
11	1. FC Mülheim-Styrum	67	4
12	Eintracht Gelsenkirchen-Horst	51	16
13	Sportfreunde Siegen	45	12
14	Arminia Gütersloh	44	13
15	Westfalia Herne	31	17
16	Rot-Weiß Lüdenscheid	27	10
17	Viktoria Köln	23	18
18	Union Ohligs	12	15

==== From the Regionalliga Berlin ====
Of the Regionalliga Berlin clubs, only Wacker 04 took up the option of entering the new 2. Bundesliga. Tennis Borussia qualified for the Bundesliga, and Blau-Weiß 1890 Berlin, next in line for the 2. Bundesliga qualification declined, as did every other club in the league.

The points table:

Rank	Club	Points 1969 to 1974	Place in 1973–74
1	Wacker 04 Berlin	100	2
2	Tennis Borussia Berlin	96	1
3	Blau-Weiß 1890 Berlin	95	3
4	Hertha Zehlendorf	79	4
5	Spandauer SV	53	10
6	Rapide Wedding	49	6
7	1. FC Neukölln	46	7
8	Berliner SV 1892	41	8
9	SC Westend 01	24	5
10	Alemannia 90 Berlin	22	12
11	BFC Preussen	14	11
12	BBC Südost	12	9

=== 2. Bundesliga Süd ===
Twenty teams from two different leagues qualified for the southern division.

==== From the Regionalliga Süd ====
Of the thirteen clubs from the Regionalliga Süd that qualified for the new 2. Bundesliga, the top two, TSV 1860 München and 1. FC Nürnberg had won German championships during the Regionalliga area. A third one, Karlsruher SC, had been a founding member of the Bundesliga. The last champions of the league, FC Augsburg, finished fourteenth in the five-year ranking, nominally just outside the thirteen qualified teams. However, the three last placed teams in the league in 1973–74, despite two of them having more points than FCA, could not qualify. One of those three, KSV Hessen Kassel, had been a strong team over the years, playing every season, and even won the inaugural championship of the league, but only managed to come 16th in the final year. Of the other nine qualified teams, Stuttgarter Kickers, FC Bayern Hof, SpVgg Fürth and FC Schweinfurt 05 had also played all eleven seasons of the league. SV Darmstadt 98, SV Waldhof Mannheim and SpVgg Bayreuth qualified on the strength of two excellent last seasons in the league while VfR Heilbronn achieved consistent results over the qualifying period. VfR Mannheim finally was the team with lowest points total to qualify from any Regionalliga and also made Mannheim the only other city alongside Hamburg to have two 2. Bundesliga teams for the inaugural season. Of the non-qualified teams Freiburger FC had also played every season of the Regionalliga.

The points table:

Rank	Club	Points 1969 to 1974	Place in 1973–74
1	TSV 1860 München	155	3
2	1. FC Nürnberg	138	2
3	Karlsruher SC	134	8
4	SV Darmstadt 98	110	4
5	FC Bayern Hof	104	9
6	Stuttgarter Kickers	98	6
7	SpVgg Bayreuth	90	5
8	VfR Heilbronn	90	12
9	KSV Hessen Kassel ^{‡}	90	16
10	SpVgg Fürth	85	10
11	FC Schweinfurt 05	68	15
12	Freiburger FC ^{‡}	68	17
13	SV Waldhof Mannheim	61	7
14	FC Augsburg	54	1
15	SSV Jahn Regensburg ^{‡}	53	18
16	VfR Mannheim	28	13
17	VfR Bürstadt	27	14
18	FSV Frankfurt	26	11

==== From the Regionalliga Südwest ====
The Regionalliga Südwest saw some controversy in selecting their seven clubs qualified for the 2. Bundesliga when SV Alsenborn was omitted for failing to fulfill all license regulations and eight placed 1. FC Saarbrücken admitted instead. SV Alsenborn, with three league championships to its name, was the only club to miss out under such circumstances while 1. FC Saarbrücken was the home club of soon to become DFB-chairman Hermann Neuberger. The other six clubs were all more obvious choices, Borussia Neunkirchen a former Bundesliga club, SV Röchling Völklingen, FSV Mainz 05, VfR Wormatia Worms and FK Pirmasens all having played every season in the league and, at various occasions either finished champions or runners-up. The seventh club, FC 08 Homburg, had entered the league in 1966 and gradually improved without ever finishing in the top two. Of the clubs that failed to qualify Südwest Ludwigshafen and TuS Neuendorf had also played every season in the league while, of the other six non-qualifiers, only ASV Landau had performed well during the five year qualifying period. FC Ensdorf, with three to its name, held the lowest point total of any Regionalliga club of 1973–74.

The points table:

Rank	Club	Points 1969 to 1974	Place in 1973–74
1	Borussia Neunkirchen	133	1
2	SV Röchling Völklingen	110	4
3	FSV Mainz 05	109	5
4	FK Pirmasens	107	8
5	SV Alsenborn	95	10
6	FC 08 Homburg	90	3
7	VfR Wormatia Worms	90	6
8	1. FC Saarbrücken	87	2
9	ASV Landau	82	9
10	Südwest Ludwigshafen	76	11
11	TuS Neuendorf	71	12
12	FV Speyer	43	15
13	Eintracht Bad Kreuznach	30	7
14	VfB Theley	27	13
15	Eisbachtaler Sportfreunde	15	14
16	FC Ensdorf	3	16

=== Key ===
Club promoted to the Bundesliga.	Club qualified for the new 2. Bundesliga.	Club failed to qualify for the new 2. Bundesliga.

- ^{‡} Denotes club had finished the 1973–74 season on a relegation rank and was barred from qualifying for the Regionalliga.

== Changes to the league system ==
Unlike in 1963 when the Bundesliga was introduced and the league system below it experienced major changes, too, the introduction of the 2. Bundesliga did not have such a great impact. The biggest change was made in the area of the Regionalliga Nord where the third tier saw the introduction of the Oberliga Nord. This league covered the same area as the Regionalliga Nord and replaced the Amateurliga Bremen, Landesliga Hamburg, Amateurliga Niedersachsen and Landesliga Schleswig-Holstein at this level. In all other regions the third division remained untouched until a major reorganisation was carried out in 1978.

=== The league system 1973–74 ===
The top three divisions of the league system in the season before the introduction of the 2. Bundesliga:

Level	League(s)/Division(s)				
I	Bundesliga; 18 clubs 2 relegations				
II	Regionalliga Berlin; 12 clubs 2 promotion round	Regionalliga Nord; 19 clubs 2 promotion round	Regionalliga West; 18 clubs 2 promotion round	Regionalliga Südwest; 16 clubs 2 promotion round	Regionalliga Süd; 18 clubs 2 promotion round
III	Amateurliga Berlin; 16 clubs	Amateurliga Bremen; 16 clubs Landesliga Hamburg; 16 clubs Amateurliga Niedersachsen; 16 clubs Landesliga Schleswig-Holstein; 16 clubs	Verbandsliga Mittelrhein; 15 clubs Verbandsliga Niederrhein; 15 clubs Verbandsliga Westfalen; 16 clubs	Amateurliga Rheinland; 16 clubs Amateurliga Saarland; 16 clubs Amateurliga Südwest; 16 clubs	Amateurliga Bayern; 18 clubs Amateurliga Hessen; 18 clubs Amateurliga Nordwürttemberg; 17 clubs Amateurliga Schwarzwald-Bodensee; 17 clubs Amateurliga Nordbaden; 16 clubs Amateurliga Südbaden; 16 clubs

=== The league system 1974–75 ===
The top three divisions of the league system in the season after the introduction of the 2. Bundesliga:

Level	League(s)/Division(s)	
I	Bundesliga; 18 clubs 3 relegations	
II	2. Bundesliga Nord; 20 clubs 1 promotion spot + 1 promotion playoff spot 4 relegations	2. Bundesliga Süd; 20 clubs 1 promotion spot + 1 promotion playoff spot 4 relegations
III	Oberliga Berlin; 18 clubs Oberliga Nord; 18 clubs Verbandsliga Mittelrhein; 17 clubs Verbandsliga Niederrhein; 16 clubs Verbandsliga Westfalen; 18 clubs	Amateurliga Rheinland; 17 clubs Amateurliga Saarland; 18 clubs Amateurliga Südwest; 19 clubs Amateurliga Bayern; 18 clubs Amateurliga Hessen; 19 clubs Amateurliga Nordwürttemberg; 16 clubs Amateurliga Schwarzwald-Bodensee; 16 clubs Amateurliga Nordbaden; 16 clubs Amateurliga Südbaden; 20 clubs

== Aftermath ==
The new second division in German football was, in this form, only to last for seven seasons. In 1981 another change was made when the 2. Bundesliga was reduced to one single division of 20 clubs. In this format it stayed until 1992, when the German reunion and the influx of clubs from former East Germany led to an expansion of the league to 24 teams for two seasons. The first of those was played in a northern and southern division, after this it returned to single division format. From 1994 onwards the league played with only 18 clubs, a number it continues to have today.

In regards to promotion from 1974 onwards three spots were available for the 2. Bundesliga. The champions were promoted directly while the runners-up played each other in a two-leg play-off to determine another spot. Promotion to the 2. Bundesliga was determined through direct promotion as well as promotion rounds, with the champions of the larger Amateurligas and Oberligas being promoted directly while the smaller ones had to decide the remaining spots in play-offs. This changed in 1978 when the third divisions were reformed and reduced in numbers.

The first-ever game in the 2. Bundesliga was played between 1. FC Saarbrücken and Darmstadt 98, with Nikolaus Semlitsch scoring the first-ever goal of the new league. Of the 40 founding members of the 2. Bundesliga, SC Fortuna Köln became the longest-lasting club, playing 26 consecutive seasons in the league until 2000, when the club was relegated, ten seasons longer than second-longest Alemannia Aachen, who held out until 1990.
