= 1973–74 Regionalliga =

Regionalliga
- Season: 1973–74
- Champions: Eintracht Braunschweig Tennis Borussia Berlin SG Wattenscheid 09 Borussia Neunkirchen FC Augsburg
- Promoted: Eintracht Braunschweig Tennis Borussia Berlin
- Relegated: 40 clubs

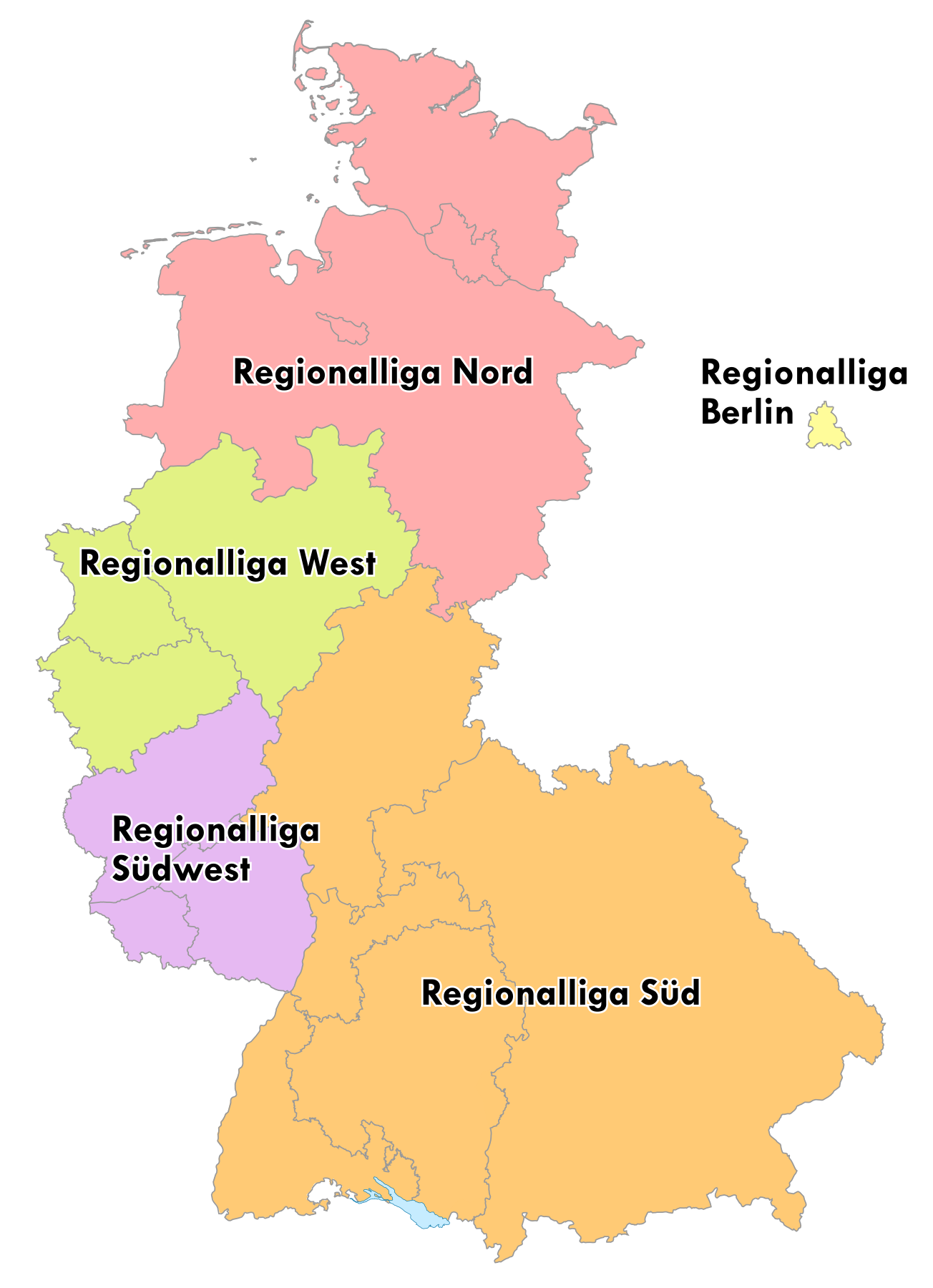
Map of the five German Regionalligas from 1963 to 1974

The 1973–74 Regionalliga was the eleventh season of the Regionalliga, the second tier of the German football league system. The league operated in five regional divisions, Berlin, North, South, Southwest and West. The five league champions and runners-up then entered a promotion play-off to determine the two clubs to move up to the Bundesliga for the next season. Northern German and Berlin champions Eintracht Braunschweig and Tennis Borussia Berlin were promoted.

It was the last season of the Regionalliga as a tier two league, being replaced by two regional divisions of the 2. Bundesliga at this level from 1974–75. Apart from the two teams promoted to the Bundesliga, 38 clubs qualified for the new 2. Bundesliga while the remaining 40 dropped down to the third division Verbandsligas, Amateurligas and Oberligas. Qualification for the 2. Bundesliga took the previous five Regionalliga season into account to determine the qualified teams, rather than just the final tables of 1973–74.

== Regionalliga Nord ==
The 1973–74 season saw three new clubs in the league, Concordia Hamburg and VfL Pinneberg, both promoted from the Amateurliga, while Eintracht Braunschweig been relegated from the Bundesliga to the league.

Pos	Team	Pld	W	D	L	GF	GA	GD	Pts	Qualification or relegation
1	Eintracht Braunschweig (P)	36	30	3	3	125	23	+102	63	Qualification for Bundesliga promotion playoffs
2	FC St. Pauli	36	26	4	6	113	48	+65	56	Qualification for Bundesliga promotion playoffs
3	VfL Osnabrück	36	18	14	4	84	43	+41	50	Qualification for 2. Bundesliga
4	VfL Wolfsburg	36	19	8	9	77	51	+26	46	Qualification for 2. Bundesliga
5	HSV Barmbeck-Uhlenhorst	36	15	13	8	48	38	+10	43	Qualification for 2. Bundesliga
6	VfB Oldenburg (R)	36	18	6	12	71	55	+16	42	Relegation to Oberliga Nord
7	Olympia Wilhelmshaven	36	16	7	13	74	57	+17	39	Qualification for 2. Bundesliga
8	SV Meppen (R)	36	13	12	11	55	54	+1	38	Relegation to Oberliga Nord
9	Arminia Hannover (R)	36	11	16	9	57	59	−2	38	Relegation to Oberliga Nord
10	Concordia Hamburg (R)	36	15	6	15	44	56	−12	36	Relegation to Oberliga Nord
11	OSV Hannover (R)	36	11	13	12	70	67	+3	35	Relegation to Oberliga Nord
12	Göttingen 05	36	12	9	15	55	46	+9	33	Qualification for 2. Bundesliga
13	Holstein Kiel (R)	36	11	9	16	54	73	−19	31	Relegation to Oberliga Nord
14	TuS Bremerhaven 93 (R)	36	11	9	16	35	61	−26	31	Relegation to Oberliga Nord
15	Heider SV (R)	36	8	7	21	48	76	−28	23	Relegation to Oberliga Nord
16	VfB Lübeck (R)	36	8	6	22	34	80	−46	22	Qualification for Oberliga Nord playoffs
17	Itzehoer SV (O)	36	7	7	22	48	107	−59	21	Qualification for Oberliga Nord playoffs
18	VfL Pinneberg (R)	36	5	10	21	43	76	−33	20	Qualification for Oberliga Nord playoffs
19	Phönix Lübeck (O)	36	6	5	25	40	105	−65	17	Qualification for Oberliga Nord playoffs

Source: Fussballdaten.de (in German)
Rules for classification: 1) Points.
(O) Play-off winners; (P) Promoted; (R) Relegated

== Regionalliga Berlin ==
The 1973–74 season saw two new clubs in the league, SC Westend 01 and BBC Südost, both promoted from the Amateurliga, while no club had been relegated from the Bundesliga to the league.

Pos	Team	Pld	W	D	L	GF	GA	GD	Pts	Qualification or relegation
1	Tennis Borussia Berlin (P)	33	31	1	1	103	19	+84	63	Qualification for Bundesliga promotion playoffs
2	Wacker 04 Berlin	33	25	3	5	118	33	+85	53	Qualification for Bundesliga promotion playoffs
3	Blau-Weiß 90 Berlin (R)	33	16	4	13	78	48	+30	36	Relegation to Oberliga Berlin
4	Hertha Zehlendorf (R)	33	13	9	11	51	44	+7	35	Relegation to Oberliga Berlin
5	SC Westend 01 (R)	33	14	6	13	60	62	−2	34	Relegation to Oberliga Berlin
6	Rapide Wedding (R)	33	13	5	15	50	66	−16	31	Relegation to Oberliga Berlin
7	1. FC Neukölln (R)	33	11	8	14	65	75	−10	30	Relegation to Oberliga Berlin
8	Berliner SV 92 (R)	33	14	2	17	46	68	−22	30	Relegation to Oberliga Berlin
9	BBC Südost (R)	33	12	5	16	53	66	−13	29	Relegation to Oberliga Berlin
10	Spandauer SV (R)	33	12	5	16	49	62	−13	29	Relegation to Oberliga Berlin
11	BFC Preußen (R)	33	8	7	18	41	64	−23	23	Qualification for relegation playoffs
12	Alemannia 90 Berlin (O)	33	1	1	31	15	122	−107	3	Qualification for relegation playoffs

Source: Weltfussball.de (in German)
Rules for classification: 1) Points.
(O) Play-off winners; (P) Promoted; (R) Relegated

== Regionalliga West ==
The 1973–74 season saw four new clubs in the league, Rot-Weiß Lüdenscheid, Viktoria Köln and OSC Solingen, all three promoted from the Amateurliga, while Rot-Weiß Oberhausen been relegated from the Bundesliga to the league.

Pos	Team	Pld	W	D	L	GF	GA	GD	Pts	Qualification or relegation
1	SG Wattenscheid 09	34	25	5	4	102	39	+63	55	Qualification for Bundesliga promotion playoffs
2	Rot-Weiß Oberhausen	34	25	4	5	85	43	+42	54	Qualification for Bundesliga promotion playoffs
3	Bayer Uerdingen	34	22	7	5	82	40	+42	51	Qualification for 2. Bundesliga
4	1. FC Mülheim-Styrum	34	20	4	10	76	49	+27	44	Qualification for 2. Bundesliga
5	Preußen Münster	34	15	8	11	57	49	+8	38	Qualification for 2. Bundesliga
6	Borussia Dortmund	34	15	7	12	63	50	+13	37	Qualification for 2. Bundesliga
7	Alemannia Aachen	34	15	7	12	57	55	+2	37	Qualification for 2. Bundesliga
8	Schwarz-Weiß Essen	34	12	10	12	57	53	+4	34	Qualification for 2. Bundesliga
9	DJK Gütersloh	34	10	12	12	54	55	−1	32	Qualification for 2. Bundesliga
10	Rot-Weiß Lüdenscheid (R)	34	12	8	14	47	58	−11	32	Relegation to Verbandsliga
11	SpVgg Erkenschwick	34	8	14	12	54	69	−15	30	Qualification for 2. Bundesliga
12	Sportfreunde Siegen (R)	34	9	10	15	59	76	−17	28	Relegation to Verbandsliga
13	Arminia Gütersloh (R)	34	9	10	15	47	66	−19	28	Relegation to Verbandsliga
14	Arminia Bielefeld	34	9	9	16	41	52	−11	27	Qualification for 2. Bundesliga
15	OSC Solingen (R)	34	7	11	16	46	68	−22	25	Relegation to Verbandsliga
16	Eintracht Gelsenkirchen-Horst (R)	34	7	8	19	42	73	−31	22	Relegation to Verbandsliga
17	Westfalia Herne (R)	34	7	5	22	44	78	−34	19	Relegation to Verbandsliga
18	Viktoria Köln (R)	34	3	13	18	42	82	−40	19	Relegation to Verbandsliga

Source: Fussballdaten.de (in German)
Rules for classification: 1) Points.
(R) Relegated

== Regionalliga Südwest ==
The 1973–74 season saw two new clubs in the league, Eintracht Kreuznach and FC Ensdorf, both promoted from the Amateurliga, while no club had been relegated from the Bundesliga to the league.

Pos	Team	Pld	W	D	L	GF	GA	GD	Pts	Qualification or relegation
1	Borussia Neunkirchen	30	20	5	5	64	29	+35	45	Qualification for Bundesliga promotion playoffs
2	1. FC Saarbrücken	30	19	5	6	59	27	+32	43	Qualification for Bundesliga promotion playoffs
3	FC Homburg	30	18	5	7	65	35	+30	41	Qualification for 2. Bundesliga
4	Röchling Völklingen	30	16	7	7	62	39	+23	39	Qualification for 2. Bundesliga
5	1. FSV Mainz 05	30	17	4	9	88	49	+39	38	Qualification for 2. Bundesliga
6	Wormatia Worms	30	15	8	7	58	42	+16	38	Qualification for 2. Bundesliga
7	Eintracht Kreuznach (R)	30	13	7	10	55	36	+19	33	Relegation to Amateurliga
8	FK Pirmasens	30	11	10	9	63	47	+16	32	Qualification for 2. Bundesliga
9	ASV Landau (R)	30	12	7	11	46	41	+5	31	Relegation to Amateurliga
10	SV Alsenborn (R)	30	10	7	13	41	48	−7	27	Relegation to Amateurliga
11	Südwest Ludwigshafen (R)	30	8	10	12	44	48	−4	26	Relegation to Amateurliga
12	TuS Neuendorf (R)	30	10	4	16	37	58	−21	24	Relegation to Amateurliga
13	VfB Theley (R)	30	10	3	17	37	60	−23	23	Relegation to Amateurliga
14	Sportfreunde Eisbachtal (R)	30	7	5	18	48	87	−39	19	Relegation to Amateurliga
15	FV Speyer (R)	30	3	7	20	31	84	−53	13	Relegation to Amateurliga
16	FC Ensdorf (R)	30	1	6	23	18	86	−68	8	Relegation to Amateurliga

Source: Fussballdaten.de (in German)
Rules for classification: 1) Points.
(R) Relegated

== Regionalliga Süd ==
The 1973–74 season saw three new clubs in the league, FC Augsburg, VfR Mannheim and FSV Frankfurt, all three promoted from the Amateurliga, while no club had been relegated from the Bundesliga to the league.

Pos	Team	Pld	W	D	L	GF	GA	GD	Pts	Qualification or relegation
1	FC Augsburg	34	20	8	6	79	47	+32	48	Qualification for Bundesliga promotion playoffs
2	1. FC Nürnberg	34	18	8	8	63	42	+21	44	Qualification for Bundesliga promotion playoffs
3	TSV 1860 München	34	19	5	10	74	35	+39	43	Qualification for 2. Bundesliga
4	SV Darmstadt 98	34	20	2	12	64	38	+26	42	Qualification for 2. Bundesliga
5	SpVgg Bayreuth	34	14	9	11	65	55	+10	37	Qualification for 2. Bundesliga
6	Stuttgarter Kickers	34	13	10	11	60	50	+10	36	Qualification for 2. Bundesliga
7	SV Chio Waldhof	34	16	4	14	62	60	+2	36	Qualification for 2. Bundesliga
8	Karlsruher SC	34	14	8	12	50	48	+2	36	Qualification for 2. Bundesliga
9	FC Bayern Hof	34	16	2	16	73	65	+8	34	Qualification for 2. Bundesliga
10	SpVgg Fürth	34	14	6	14	48	45	+3	34	Qualification for 2. Bundesliga
11	FSV Frankfurt (R)	34	14	6	14	54	54	0	34	Relegation to Amateurliga
12	VfR Heilbronn	34	12	10	12	69	74	−5	34	Qualification for 2. Bundesliga
13	VfR Mannheim	34	12	7	15	53	75	−22	31	Qualification for 2. Bundesliga
14	VfR Bürstadt (R)	34	10	9	15	44	57	−13	29	Relegation to Amateurliga
15	FC Schweinfurt 05	34	13	3	18	39	54	−15	29	Qualification for 2. Bundesliga
16	KSV Hessen Kassel (R)	34	10	8	16	47	57	−10	28	Relegation to Amateurliga
17	Freiburger FC (R)	34	6	8	20	31	81	−50	20	Relegation to Amateurliga
18	Jahn Regensburg (R)	34	4	9	21	39	77	−38	17	Relegation to Amateurliga

Source: Weltfussball.de (in German)
Rules for classification: 1) Points.
(R) Relegated

== Bundesliga promotion round ==
=== Group 1 ===
Pos	Team	Pld	W	D	L	GF	GA	GD	Pts	Promotion
1	Eintracht Braunschweig (P)	8	5	1	2	13	6	+7	11	Promotion to Bundesliga
2	1. FC Nürnberg	8	5	1	2	18	12	+6	11	
3	SG Wattenscheid 09	8	3	2	3	11	11	0	8	
4	Wacker 04 Berlin	8	3	1	4	13	18	−5	7	
5	1. FC Saarbrücken	8	1	1	6	6	14	−8	3	

Source: Fussballdaten.de (in German)
Rules for classification: 1) Points.
(P) Promoted

=== Group 2 ===
Pos	Team	Pld	W	D	L	GF	GA	GD	Pts	Qualification or relegation
1	Tennis Borussia Berlin (P)	8	3	4	1	13	11	+2	10	Promotion to Bundesliga
2	FC Augsburg	8	2	5	1	18	17	+1	9	
3	Rot-Weiß Oberhausen	8	4	1	3	14	13	+1	9	
4	Borussia Neunkirchen	8	2	3	3	8	11	−3	7	
5	FC St. Pauli	8	2	1	5	16	17	−1	5	

Source: Fussballdaten.de (in German)
Rules for classification: 1) Points.
(P) Promoted

== Oberliga Nord qualification ==
=== Group 1 ===
Pos	Team	Pld	W	D	L	GF	GA	GD	Pts	Promotion
1	Bremer SV (P)	4	2	1	1	4	4	0	5	Promotion to Oberliga Nord
2	SC Poppenbüttel (P)	4	2	1	1	6	10	−4	5	Promotion to Oberliga Nord
3	Hannover 96 II	4	2	0	2	9	8	+1	4	
4	VfB Lübeck	4	1	1	2	13	9	+4	3	
5	SV Blankenese	4	1	1	2	5	6	−1	3	

Source: kicker-Almanach 1990 (in German)
Rules for classification: 1) Points
(P) Promoted

=== Group 2 ===
Pos	Team	Pld	W	D	L	GF	GA	GD	Pts	Qualification
1	Itzehoer SV (O)	4	4	0	0	10	4	+6	8	Qualification for Oberliga Nord
2	Phönix Lübeck (O)	4	2	1	1	4	4	0	5	Qualification for Oberliga Nord
3	Büdelsdorfer TSV	4	1	1	2	5	8	−3	3	
4	VfL Pinneberg	4	1	0	3	7	7	0	2	
5	VfR Neumünster	4	1	0	3	3	6	−3	2	

Source: kicker-Almanach 1990 (in German)
Rules for classification: 1) Points.
(O) Play-off winners

== Oberliga Berlin playoffs ==
Team 1	Agg.	Team 2	1st leg	2nd leg	3rd match
Union 06 Berlin (AL)	3–0	BFC Preussen (OL)	1–0	~~0–4~~	2–0
BFC Alemannia 1890 (OL)	3–2	Hellas-Nordwest (AL)	2–1	1–1	—

- BFC Preussen appealed against the change in format following the first leg. The second was originally decided 4–1 in a penalty shoot-out in Union 06 Berlin's favor. As a result, the Verband Berliner Ballspielvereine [VBB; Berlin Football Association's (BFV) predecessor] match committee scheduled a third match.
