= 1978–79 2. Bundesliga =

5th season of the second-tier football league in Germany

2. Bundesliga
- Season: 1978–79
- Champions: Nord: Bayer Leverkusen; Süd: TSV 1860 Munich
- Promoted: Nord: Bayer Leverkusen; Bayer Uerdingen; Süd: TSV 1860 Munich
- Relegated: Nord: Westfalia Herne; FC St. Pauli; Wacker 04 Berlin; Süd: FC Hanau 93; FC Augsburg; KSV Baunatal; Borussia Neunkirchen
- Matches: Nord: 380; Süd: 380
- Top goalscorer: Nord: Karl-Heinz Mödrath (28 goals); Süd: Eduard Kirschner (33 goals)
- Average attendance: Nord: 4,280; Süd: 4,857

The 1978–79 2. Bundesliga season was the fifth season of the 2. Bundesliga, the second tier of the German football league system. It was played in two regional divisions, Nord and Süd.

Bayer Leverkusen, TSV 1860 Munich and Bayer Uerdingen were promoted to the Bundesliga while Westfalia Herne, FC St. Pauli, Wacker 04 Berlin, FC Hanau 93, FC Augsburg, KSV Baunatal and Borussia Neunkirchen were relegated to the Oberligas.

== Nord ==
For the 1978–79 season saw DSC Wanne-Eickel, Holstein Kiel, Viktoria Köln and Wacker 04 Berlin promoted to the 2. Bundesliga from the Oberliga and Amateurligas while FC St. Pauli had been relegated to the 2. Bundesliga Nord from the Bundesliga.

=== League table ===
Pos	Team	Pld	W	D	L	GF	GA	GD	Pts	Promotion, qualification or relegation
1	Bayer Leverkusen (C, P)	38	24	11	3	87	34	+53	59	Promotion to Bundesliga
2	KFC Uerdingen (P)	38	22	9	7	83	44	+39	53	Qualification to promotion play-offs
3	Preußen Münster	38	21	9	8	59	25	+34	51	
4	Fortuna Köln	38	18	11	9	84	52	+32	47	
5	Westfalia Herne (Note: Westfalia Herne voluntarily returned their license for the following season to the DFB and were therefore relegated.) (R)	38	16	11	11	65	47	+18	43	Relegation to Oberliga
6	FC St. Pauli (Note: FC St. Pauli were not granted a license for the following season by the DFB and were therefore relegated.) (R)	38	16	11	11	56	49	+7	43	Relegation to Oberliga
7	Alemannia Aachen	38	14	12	12	54	47	+7	40	
8	Rot-Weiss Essen	38	14	11	13	68	62	+6	39	
9	SG Union Solingen	38	14	11	13	47	49	−2	39	
10	SG Wattenscheid 09	38	10	16	12	49	47	+2	36	
11	Tennis Borussia Berlin	38	12	12	14	58	61	−3	36	
12	Arminia Hannover	38	13	10	15	56	65	−9	36	
13	DSC Wanne-Eickel	38	11	13	14	66	66	0	35	
14	Holstein Kiel	38	13	9	16	40	62	−22	35	
15	Hannover 96	38	9	16	13	57	68	−11	34	
16	Viktoria Köln	38	10	12	16	53	60	−7	32	
17	Wuppertaler SV	38	9	12	17	46	57	−11	30	
18	VfL Osnabrück	38	10	9	19	49	71	−22	29	
19	Rot-Weiß Lüdenscheid	38	8	6	24	49	106	−57	22	
20	Wacker 04 Berlin (R)	38	8	5	25	33	87	−54	21	Relegation to Oberliga

Source: Bundesliga.de
Rules for classification: 1) points; 2) goal difference; 3) number of goals scored.
(C) Champions; (P) Promoted; (R) Relegated

=== Results ===
Home \ Away	AAC	TBB	W04	RWE	H96	SVA	SCW	KSV	FKO	FCV	B04	RWL	PRM	OSN	SGU	STP	B05	WAN	SGW	WSV
Alemannia Aachen	—	1–1	3–0	1–0	1–1	4–0	3–5	4–0	1–1	0–0	1–4	5–2	1–0	4–0	3–1	0–0	4–0	2–2	0–1	1–0
Tennis Borussia Berlin	2–1	—	1–2	1–1	3–3	1–1	2–1	9–0	5–6	4–0	0–2	2–0	0–2	3–0	3–3	0–0	1–4	1–1	2–1	1–0
Wacker 04 Berlin	0–1	2–3	—	1–0	0–0	0–2	0–3	1–0	2–2	1–0	0–0	2–1	1–1	2–1	0–1	2–4	0–7	0–4	4–2	1–0
Rot-Weiss Essen	3–0	0–2	3–2	—	2–2	2–1	1–3	2–0	1–1	1–3	3–3	4–2	2–0	3–0	1–1	4–1	3–3	2–1	7–2	4–1
Hannover 96	1–1	3–0	2–1	1–3	—	1–1	1–0	2–2	3–3	0–2	2–1	4–1	1–1	1–1	1–0	0–2	1–1	4–2	1–1	2–2
Arminia Hannover	0–0	1–1	3–0	3–0	3–2	—	1–1	1–0	2–2	3–2	1–1	2–1	1–3	2–0	3–1	0–2	1–3	1–1	3–0	4–1
Westfalia Herne	0–1	1–2	3–0	2–2	4–2	4–0	—	2–0	1–0	4–1	0–1	3–0	1–1	2–3	3–2	1–1	3–2	0–2	2–1	2–1
Holstein Kiel	2–1	0–0	3–0	2–2	2–1	2–0	2–1	—	0–0	2–0	1–2	5–0	1–0	3–2	0–1	2–1	1–1	3–1	1–0	0–0
Fortuna Köln	1–0	4–0	3–1	2–2	4–1	3–0	4–0	5–0	—	2–1	1–3	2–2	0–2	4–2	3–0	2–0	2–4	5–0	2–1	2–2
Viktoria Köln	2–2	2–0	1–0	3–2	1–1	2–5	1–3	2–0	0–1	—	1–4	9–2	1–1	2–2	1–1	3–0	2–1	2–1	0–0	1–1
Bayer Leverkusen	2–0	5–2	3–1	4–0	2–1	3–0	1–1	2–1	1–2	2–0	—	8–1	3–2	3–0	2–0	3–0	3–3	4–1	1–2	0–0
Rot-Weiß Lüdenscheid	1–1	1–0	4–1	2–0	2–4	0–4	0–3	1–3	0–4	1–1	1–3	—	2–1	4–2	3–1	1–3	1–3	2–5	1–1	4–2
Preußen Münster	4–0	2–2	4–0	1–1	2–1	2–0	1–1	2–0	2–1	2–0	0–0	1–0	—	1–0	2–0	4–0	2–0	1–0	2–0	4–0
VfL Osnabrück	2–3	2–0	1–0	1–2	4–1	2–0	2–1	0–0	2–1	1–1	1–3	1–1	0–2	—	0–1	2–2	1–1	4–3	1–1	3–1
Union Solingen	1–0	4–0	5–2	3–1	1–1	2–1	0–0	1–1	3–3	3–2	1–1	2–0	0–1	2–1	—	1–0	2–1	1–1	1–0	0–1
FC St. Pauli	0–0	0–2	5–1	2–1	0–1	4–1	0–0	4–0	2–1	1–1	1–1	3–1	1–0	2–2	4–1	—	1–4	2–1	2–0	1–0
Bayer Uerdingen	1–0	2–0	4–0	1–0	4–0	5–1	3–1	3–0	2–0	2–1	0–0	2–0	2–1	3–0	0–0	2–0	—	2–1	1–1	4–2
DSC Wanne-Eickel	1–1	2–2	4–2	3–1	1–1	5–2	1–1	1–1	2–1	2–1	1–2	2–2	2–1	4–1	2–0	1–2	1–1	—	2–3	0–0
SG Wattenscheid	5–0	1–0	0–0	0–1	2–0	1–1	1–1	2–0	1–1	1–1	1–1	6–0	0–0	1–0	0–0	2–2	5–1	2–2	—	0–2
Wuppertaler SV	1–3	0–0	3–1	1–1	5–3	1–1	1–1	5–0	1–3	1–0	1–3	1–2	0–1	1–2	1–0	1–1	2–0	3–0	1–1	—

Source: DFB
Legend: Blue = home team win; Yellow = draw; Red = away team win.

=== Top scorers ===
The league's top scorers:

Goals	Player	Team
28	(Germany) Karl-Heinz Mödrath	Fortuna Köln
23	(Germany) Matthias Brücken	Bayer Leverkusen
23	(Germany) Dieter Schatzschneider	Hannover 96
23	(Germany) Gerd-Volker Schock	VfL Osnabrück
23	(Germany) Winfried Stradt	Alemannia Aachen
22	(Germany) Wolfgang Lüttges	Bayer Uerdingen
21	(Germany) Elmar Jürgens	Preußen Münster
16	(Germany) Klaus Beverungen	FC St. Pauli/Westfalia Herne
15	(Germany) Klaus-Dieter Czizewski	Viktoria Köln
15	(Germany) Norbert Lücke	DSC Wanne-Eickel
15	(Germany) Frank Mill	Rot-Weiss Essen
15	(Germany) Peter Szech	Bayer Leverkusen

== Süd ==
For the 1978–79 season saw Borussia Neunkirchen, FC Hanau 93, MTV Ingolstadt and SC Freiburg promoted to the 2. Bundesliga from the Amateurligas and 1. FC Saarbrücken and TSV 1860 Munich relegated to the 2. Bundesliga Süd from the Bundesliga.

=== League table ===
Pos	Team	Pld	W	D	L	GF	GA	GD	Pts	Promotion, qualification or relegation
1	1860 Munich (C, P)	38	21	11	6	75	38	+37	53	Promotion to Bundesliga
2	SpVgg Bayreuth	38	21	10	7	86	53	+33	52	Qualification to promotion play-offs
3	Wormatia Worms	38	21	8	9	66	33	+33	50	
4	SpVgg Fürth	38	21	7	10	66	45	+21	49	
5	Karlsruher SC	38	20	7	11	77	50	+27	47	
6	Kickers Offenbach	38	17	9	12	86	62	+24	43	
7	FC Homburg	38	17	9	12	65	47	+18	43	
8	1. FC Saarbrücken	38	15	11	12	70	58	+12	41	
9	Stuttgarter Kickers	38	15	11	12	68	59	+9	41	
10	Eintracht Trier	38	12	12	14	58	57	+1	36	
11	MTV Ingolstadt	38	16	3	19	62	82	−20	35	
12	FSV Frankfurt	38	15	4	19	59	66	−7	34	
13	Freiburger FC	38	15	3	20	58	75	−17	33	
14	FV Würzburg	38	13	7	18	40	62	−22	33	
15	SC Freiburg	38	11	10	17	51	75	−24	32	
16	Waldhof Mannheim	38	11	9	18	46	56	−10	31	
17	FC Hanau 93 (R)	38	11	7	20	72	98	−26	29	Relegation to Oberliga
18	FC Augsburg (R)	38	11	6	21	55	89	−34	28	Relegation to Oberliga
19	KSV Baunatal (R)	38	12	2	24	49	67	−18	26	Relegation to Oberliga
20	Borussia Neunkirchen (R)	38	10	4	24	47	84	−37	24	Relegation to Oberliga

Source: Bundesliga.de
Rules for classification: 1) points; 2) goal difference; 3) number of goals scored.
(C) Champions; (P) Promoted; (R) Relegated

=== Results ===
Home \ Away	FCA	BAU	BAY	FSV	FFC	SCF	FUE	H93	HOM	MTV	KSC	WMA	M60	BNE	KOF	FCS	SKI	TRI	W08	FVW
FC Augsburg	—	1–2	1–0	4–1	5–2	2–2	2–4	7–3	1–1	1–2	0–2	1–0	1–2	3–2	2–1	4–3	1–1	0–0	1–0	0–1
KSV Baunatal	4–0	—	1–0	3–1	2–0	2–2	1–2	1–3	1–4	1–0	0–5	1–2	2–0	0–2	1–2	3–0	1–2	2–0	1–3	3–1
SpVgg Bayreuth	2–0	2–2	—	2–4	3–1	3–3	2–1	4–3	1–1	4–0	1–1	1–0	2–2	7–1	4–3	2–2	2–0	1–0	2–1	3–0
FSV Frankfurt	2–1	1–0	1–1	—	4–0	4–1	3–1	2–1	2–1	4–1	1–0	1–0	2–2	3–2	0–3	5–0	2–2	0–1	1–2	1–2
Freiburger FC	2–1	3–2	2–1	2–1	—	3–0	2–3	5–1	3–1	4–1	1–3	0–1	1–2	2–0	3–2	0–4	3–1	3–1	0–0	0–0
SC Freiburg	3–0	3–1	5–2	2–0	1–0	—	0–0	2–2	0–5	3–0	0–1	0–2	1–3	4–4	2–1	4–3	0–0	2–2	0–2	1–0
SpVgg Fürth	3–1	3–1	0–0	1–1	3–1	2–0	—	4–0	2–0	1–0	0–2	0–1	2–1	3–0	1–2	2–1	2–1	2–0	2–0	3–0
FC Hanau 93	5–6	0–3	1–5	5–1	2–0	3–0	3–2	—	2–2	4–0	1–4	3–3	2–3	4–0	2–2	1–3	3–3	2–1	2–1	3–1
FC Homburg	5–0	3–0	2–1	2–0	0–1	0–0	4–0	2–1	—	0–2	3–0	1–0	1–1	3–2	3–3	0–0	1–2	2–1	1–1	0–1
MTV Ingolstadt	2–1	1–0	0–3	3–0	7–1	5–2	1–4	3–2	3–4	—	4–2	2–1	0–0	3–0	3–2	2–1	1–0	1–1	3–1	2–0
Karlsruher SC	4–0	3–2	3–3	2–1	2–1	4–1	1–2	3–1	1–3	5–1	—	0–0	1–0	3–1	2–3	1–2	3–0	4–4	2–0	4–1
Waldhof Mannheim	0–0	1–2	2–3	1–0	2–4	0–1	1–2	0–0	1–3	3–0	1–1	—	1–1	2–0	3–1	2–5	3–5	2–0	1–2	2–0
1860 Munich	4–0	2–0	1–3	3–0	4–0	3–1	2–2	2–1	0–0	5–0	3–0	3–1	—	1–0	4–4	3–1	3–1	2–0	2–1	2–0
Borussia Neunkirchen	3–0	1–0	1–5	1–4	3–2	4–0	0–2	1–1	1–0	3–2	1–2	1–1	0–2	—	1–0	1–0	0–1	2–2	1–2	4–1
Kickers Offenbach	5–0	2–0	1–1	4–2	0–1	5–0	1–0	2–0	2–0	3–1	1–1	3–3	1–1	3–1	—	3–1	4–2	4–1	0–2	6–1
1. FC Saarbrücken	3–3	2–1	2–4	1–0	2–0	2–1	0–0	1–2	1–2	5–1	2–0	1–1	3–1	4–1	5–1	—	1–1	2–2	1–1	3–1
Stuttgarter Kickers	4–1	3–2	0–1	2–0	3–3	3–1	2–2	4–1	0–2	5–1	2–1	3–0	0–3	3–0	2–2	2–2	—	3–1	0–1	2–0
Eintracht Trier	2–1	2–1	2–3	4–1	2–1	1–0	3–1	8–1	3–1	2–2	1–1	1–2	0–0	2–1	3–2	0–0	1–1	—	0–1	3–0
Wormatia Worms	6–0	4–0	2–0	3–1	3–1	0–0	4–1	4–0	3–1	2–1	0–2	3–0	1–0	4–0	3–2	0–1	2–2	0–0	—	1–1
FV Würzburg 04	1–3	1–0	1–2	0–2	2–0	1–3	1–1	3–1	4–1	2–1	2–1	1–0	2–2	3–1	0–0	0–0	2–0	3–1	0–0	—

Source: DFB
Legend: Blue = home team win; Yellow = draw; Red = away team win.

=== Top scorers ===
The league's top scorers:

Goals	Player	Team
33	(Germany) Eduard Kirschner	SpVgg Fürth
24	(Germany) Uwe Sommerer	SpVgg Bayreuth
23	(Germany) Karl Allgöwer	Stuttgarter Kickers
20	(Germany) Paul Dörflinger	SC Freiburg
19	(Germany) Franz Gerber	TSV 1860 Munich
19	(Germany) Walter Krause	Kickers Offenbach
19	(Germany) Werner Seubert	VfR Wormatia Worms
18	(Germany) Rainer Künkel	1. FC Saarbrücken
17	(Germany) Hermann Bitz	Kickers Offenbach
16	(Germany) Raimund Krauth	Karlsruher SC

== Promotion play-offs ==
The final place in the Bundesliga was contested between the two runners-up in the Nord and Süd divisions. Bayer Uerdingen won on aggregate and were promoted to the Bundesliga.

Team 1	Agg.	Team 2	1st leg	2nd leg
SpVgg Bayreuth (S)	2–3	Bayer Uerdingen (N)	1–1	1–2
