= 2. Bundesliga Süd (1974–1981) =

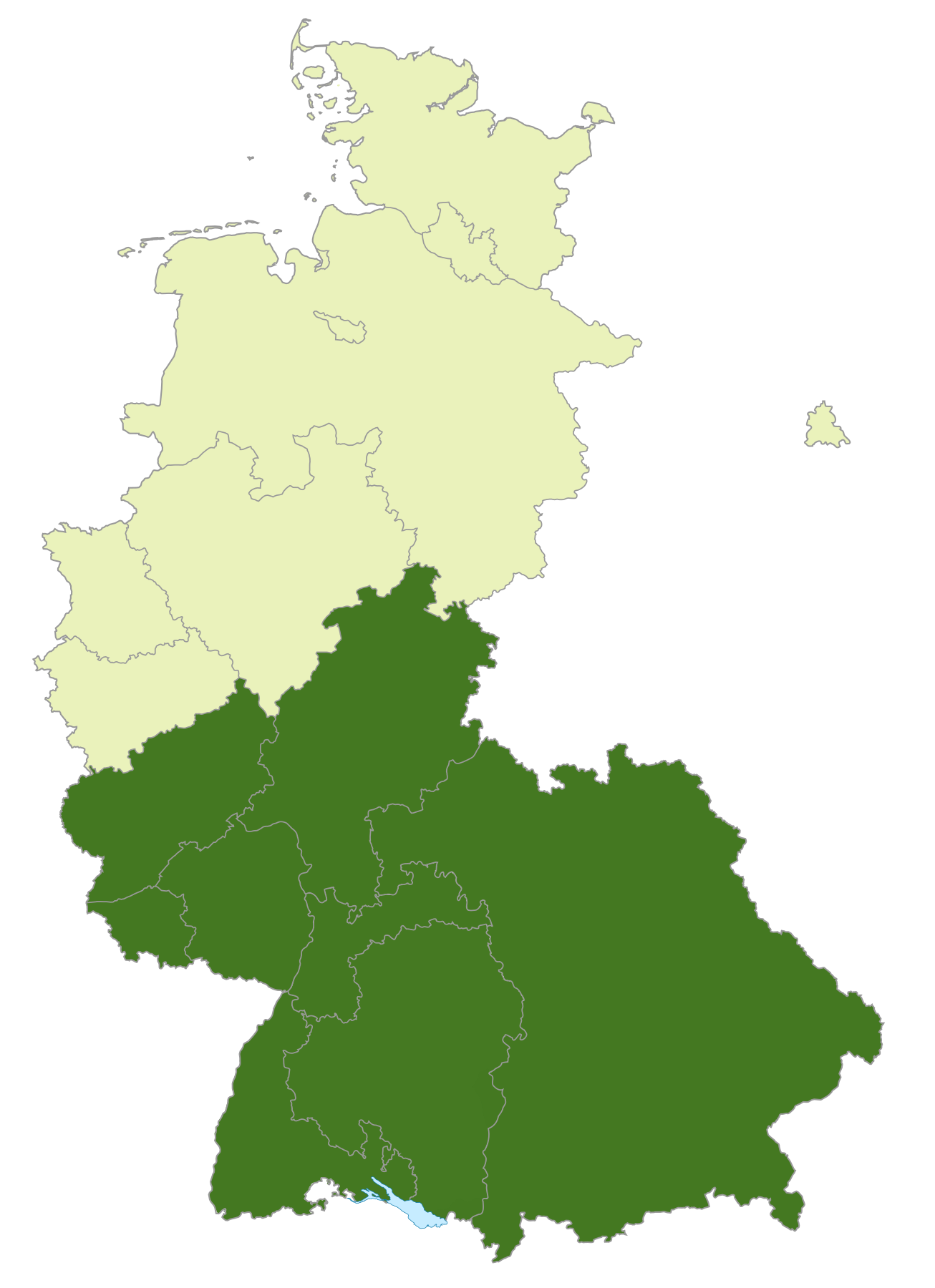
- Founded: 1974
- Folded: 1981
- Replaced by: 2. Bundesliga
- Country: West Germany
- States: Bavaria; Baden-Württemberg; Hesse; Rheinland-Pfalz; Saarland
- Level on pyramid: Level 2
- Promotion to: Bundesliga
- Relegation to: Oberliga Bayern; Oberliga Hessen; Oberliga Baden-Württemberg; Oberliga Südwest
- Last champions: SV Darmstadt 98 (1980–81)

The 2. Bundesliga Süd was the second-highest level of the West German football league system in the south of West Germany from its introduction in 1974 until the formation of the single-division 2. Bundesliga in 1981. It covered the southern states of Saarland, Rhineland-Palatinate, Baden-Württemberg, Hesse and Bavaria.

== Overview ==
The league was established in 1974 to reduce the number of second divisions in Germany from five to two and thereby allow direct promotion to the league winners. Along with the foundation of the 2. Bundesliga Süd, formed from clubs of the two former Regionalligas of Süd and Südwest, went the foundation of the 2. Bundesliga Nord, which was created from clubs of the other three Regionalligas, Nord, Berlin and West.

The league was created from thirteen southern and seven southwestern clubs, reflecting the difference in size of the two regions, south being much the larger.

The winner of the 2. Bundesliga Süd was directly promoted to the Bundesliga, the runners-up played a home-and-away series versus the northern runners-up for the third promotion spot.

The league operated with 20 teams in six seasons of its existence, only in 1980 were there 21 teams in the league. The bottom three, some years four teams were relegated to the Amateurligas, after 1978 to the new Oberligas.

Until 1978, below the 2. Bundesliga Süd ranked the following Amateurligas:

- Saarland
- Rheinland
- Südwest
- Württemberg
- Schwarzwald-Bodensee
- Nordbaden
- Südbaden
- Hessen
- Bayern

The winners of the larger leagues of Bayern and Hessen were directly promoted, while the other seven leagues had to play-off for two more promotion spots. After 1978, these seven leagues merged down to two new leagues and the champions of those four remaining leagues, now called Oberligas, were all directly promoted to the 2. Bundesliga Süd.

- Südwest
- Baden-Württemberg
- Hessen
- Bayern

In 1981, the two 2. Bundesligas merged into one, country-wide division. Nine clubs from the south and eight from the north plus the three relegated teams from the Bundesliga were admitted into the new league, the 2. Bundesliga.

The Stuttgarter Kickers, SV Waldhof Mannheim, SpVgg Fürth, SpVgg Bayreuth and FC Homburg all played every one of the seven seasons of the league.

== Qualifying to the 2. Bundesliga Süd ==
From the Regionalliga Südwest, seven clubs qualified for the new 2. Bundesliga Süd; from the Regionalliga Süd it was 13 clubs.

The qualifying modus saw the last five seasons counted, whereby the last placed team in each season received one point, the second-last two points and so on. For a Bundesliga season within this five-year period, a club received 25 points; for an Amateurliga season, none.

For the seasons 1969–70 and 70–71, the received points counted single, for the 71–72 and 72–73 season double and for the 73–74 season three times.

To be considered in the points table for the new league, a club had to play either in the Regionalliga in 1973–74 or to have been relegated from the Bundesliga to it for the next season, something which did not apply for the south as both teams relegated from the Bundesliga in 1974 went to the north.

The bottom three clubs in each league, nominally the relegated teams in every other season, were barred from entry to the 2. Bundesliga, regardless of where they stood in the points ranking.

=== Regionalliga Südwest points table ===
Rank	Club	Points 1969–74	Place in 1973–74
1	Borussia Neunkirchen	133	1
2	SV Röchling Völklingen	110	4
3	FSV Mainz 05	109	5
4	FK Pirmasens	107	8
5	SV Alsenborn^{1}	95	10
6	FC 08 Homburg	90	3
7	VfR Wormatia Worms	90	6
8	1. FC Saarbrücken	87	2
9	ASV Landau	82	9
10	Südwest Ludwigshafen	76	11
11	TuS Neuendorf	71	12
12	FV Speyer	43	15
13	Eintracht Bad Kreuznach	30	7
14	VfB Theley	27	13
15	Sportfreunde Eisbachtal	15	14
16	FC Ensdorf	3	16

- Source: DSFS Liga-Chronik (in German), page: C4, accessed: 18 March 2009
- Bold teams are promoted to the 2. Bundesliga.
- ^{1} SV Alsenborn was denied the 2. Bundesliga licence.

=== Regionalliga Süd points table ===
Rank	Club	Points 1969–74	Place in 1973–74
1	TSV 1860 Munich	155	3
2	1. FC Nürnberg	138	2
3	Karlsruher SC	134	8
4	SV Darmstadt 98	110	4
5	FC Bayern Hof	104	9
6	Stuttgarter Kickers	98	6
7	SpVgg Bayreuth	90	5
8	VfR Heilbronn	90	12
9	Hessen Kassel^{1}	90	16
10	SpVgg Fürth	85	10
11	FC Schweinfurt 05	68	15
12	Freiburger FC^{1}	68	17
13	SV Waldhof Mannheim	61	7
14	FC Augsburg	54	1
15	Jahn Regensburg^{1}	53	18
16	VfR Mannheim	28	13
17	VfR Bürstadt	27	14
18	FSV Frankfurt	26	11

- Source: DSFS Liga-Chronik (in German), page: C4, accessed: 18 March 2009
- Bold teams are promoted to the 2. Bundesliga.
- ^{1} Barred from gaining access to the 2. Bundesliga due to having finished on a relegation spot.

== Disbanding of the 2. Bundesliga Süd ==
The league was dissolved in 1981. According to their performance of the last couple of seasons, nine clubs of the league went to the new 2. Bundesliga while the champion was promoted to Bundesliga. The ten remaining clubs were relegated to the Amateurligas.

The teams admitted to the 2. Bundesliga were:

- Kickers Offenbach, runners-up
- Stuttgarter Kickers, 3rd
- KSV Hessen Kassel, 4th
- SV Waldhof Mannheim, 6th
- SC Freiburg, 7th
- SpVgg Bayreuth, 9th
- Freiburger FC, 10th
- VfR Wormatia Worms, 12th
- SpVgg Fürth, 14th

Of the nine clubs, only one came from the southwest region, VfR Wormatia Worms; all others were southern clubs.

Relegated teams to the Oberliga:

- Bayern: ESV Ingolstadt, FC Augsburg
- Hessen: VfR Bürstadt, FSV Frankfurt
- Baden-Württemberg: SSV Ulm 1846, VfB Eppingen
- Südwest: Eintracht Trier, FC Homburg, 1. FC Saarbrücken, Borussia Neunkirchen

The reduction in numbers of second division teams hit especially the Saarland hard, having their three most well known clubs, all members of the Bundesliga at some stage, relegated. While the FC Homburg and the 1. FC Saarbrücken soon bounced back, Borussia Neunkirchen never returned to second division football but did remain a force in the Oberliga Südwest.

== Winners and runners-up ==
The winners and runners-up of the league were:

Season	Club	Runners-up
1974–75	Karlsruher SC	FK Pirmasens
1975–76	1. FC Saarbrücken	1. FC Nürnberg
1976–77	VfB Stuttgart	**TSV 1860 Munich**
1977–78	SV Darmstadt 98	**1. FC Nürnberg**
1978–79	TSV 1860 Munich	SpVgg Bayreuth
1979–80	1. FC Nürnberg	**Karlsruher SC**
1980–81	SV Darmstadt 98	Kickers Offenbach

- Promoted teams in **bold**.

== Play-offs for Bundesliga promotion ==
The third promotion spot to the Bundesliga was decided through a play-off round of the runners-up of the two 2. Bundesligas. The results of this round are as follows:

Season	North	South	Results
1975	FK Pirmasens	**Bayer Uerdingen**	4-4 / 0-6
1976	1. FC Nürnberg	**Borussia Dortmund**	0-1 / 2-3
1977	**TSV 1860 Munich**	Arminia Bielefeld	4-0 / 0-4 / 2-0
1978	**1. FC Nürnberg**	RW Essen	1-0 / 2-2
1979	SpVgg Bayreuth	**Bayer Uerdingen**	1-1 / 1-2
1980	**Karlsruher SC**	RW Essen	5-1 / 1-3
1981	Kickers Offenbach	**Eintracht Braunschweig**	1-0 / 0-2

- **Bold** denotes promotion-winner.

== Placings in the 2. Bundesliga Süd 1974–1981 ==
The league placings from 1974 to 1981:

Club	1975	1976	1977	1978	1979	1980	1981
VfB Stuttgart	**B**	11	**1**	**B**	**B**	**B**	**B**
TSV 1860 Munich	5	4	2	**B**	**1**	**B**	**B**
1. FC Nürnberg	6	2	5	2	**B**	**1**	**B**
Karlsruher SC	**1**	**B**	**B**	7	5	2	**B**
SV Darmstadt 98	10	7	6	**1**	**B**	4	**1**
Kickers Offenbach	**B**	**B**	3	5	6	8	2
Stuttgarter Kickers	16	16	10	10	9	3	3
KSV Hessen Kassel							4
SSV Ulm 1846						16	5
SV Waldhof Mannheim	8	8	11	8	16	11	6
SC Freiburg					15	6	7
Eintracht Trier			17	12	10	15	8
SpVgg Bayreuth	9	5	14	4	2	13	9
Freiburger FC				13	13	9	10
FC Homburg	14	3	4	3	7	12	11
VfR Wormatia Worms	19			9	3	10	12
VfR Bürstadt				18		14	13
SpVgg Fürth	15	10	8	6	4	7	14
FSV Frankfurt		13	7	15	12	18	15
ESV Ingolstadt						17	16
1. FC Saarbrücken	7	**1**	**B**	**B**	8	5	17
FC Augsburg	12	15	9	14	18		18
Borussia Neunkirchen	18				20		19
VfB Eppingen							20
MTV Ingolstadt					11	19	
SV Röchling Völklingen	13	6	16			20	
FV Würzburg 04			13	11	14	21	
FC Hanau 93					17		
KSV Baunatal			15	16	19		
FC Bayern Hof	4	9	12	17			
Kickers Würzburg				19			
FK Pirmasens	2	14	18	20			
SSV Jahn Regensburg		17	19				
BSV Schwenningen			20				
FSV Mainz 05	11	12					
FC Schweinfurt 05	3	18					
Eintracht Bad Kreuznach		19					
SSV Reutlingen		20					
VfR Heilbronn	17						
VfR Mannheim	20						

Source:"2. Bundesliga Süd". Das deutsche Fussball-Archiv (in German). Archived from the original on 5 January 2008.

=== Key ===
Symbol	Key
**B**	Bundesliga
Place	League
Blank	Played at a league level below this league

=== Notes ===
- FSV Mainz 05 withdrew from the league in 1976.

== Top scorers ==
Year	Player	Club	Goals
1974–75	Bernd Hoffmann	Karlsruher SC	25
1975–76	Karl-Heinz Granitza	Röchling Völklingen	29
1976–77	Lothar Emmerich	Würzburger FV 04	29
1977–78	Emanuel Günther	Karlsruher SC	27
1978–79	Eduard Kirschner	SpVgg Fürth	33
1979–80	Emanuel Günther	Karlsruher SC	29
1980–81	Horst Neumann	SV Darmstadt 98	27

Source: 100 Jahre Süddeutscher Fußball-Verband. Vindelica Verlag. 1997. p. 173.
