= Friedrich Wilhelm Nohe =

German footballer, administrator (1864–1940)

2nd President of the DFB
- In office 22 May 1904 – 21 May 1905
- Preceded by: Ferdinand Hueppe
- Succeeded by: Gottfried Hinze

Personal details
- Born: Friedrich Wilhelm Nohe; 10 April 1864
- Died: 13 October 1940 (aged 76)
- Occupation: Teacher

Friedrich Wilhelm Nohe (10 April 1864 – 13 October 1940) was a German teacher, football player, and football administrator. From 1904 to 1905 he was the President of the German Football Association (German: Deutscher Fußball-Bund, DFB).

Nohe got to know the game of football when he was a teacher of modern languages at a military school in London. When he moved to Karlsruhe in 1896, he had already been playing for five years. In Karlsruhe, he joined the Karlsruher FV football club and was elected as chairman of the club in October 1896. A year later he was involved, as a representative of the Karlsruher FV, in the founding of the Southern German Football Association (German: Süddeutscher Fussball-Verband, SFV). In 1898, Nohe was elected first chairman of SFV. He remained chairman until 1907 and during his nearly ten-year term, the association grew to nearly 200 clubs with 10,000 members.

In addition to his position as Chairman of SFV, Nohe was also President of the German Football Association from 22 May 1904 to 21 May 1905.
