= Gottfried Hinze =

German businessman, athlete, administrator

3rd President of the DFB
- In office 21 May 1905 – 1925
- Preceded by: Friedrich Wilhelm Nohe
- Succeeded by: Felix Linnemann

Personal details
- Born: 2 November 1873 Aachen, German Empire
- Died: 23 August 1953 (aged 79) Duisburg, West Germany

Gottfried Hinze (2 November 1873 – 23 August 1953) was a German businessman, athlete, and football administrator. He was President of the German Football Association (German: Deutscher Fußball-Bund, DFB) from 1905 to 1925.

Hinze joined the sports club Duisburger TV. He was a gymnast and played rounders. In 1892 in the club established a football department, which traveled to England in 1896 and played four games against amateur clubs. In 1900, the football department went independent, founding the Duisburg SpV. Hinze played until 1908 for the Duisburg SpV as goalkeeper. Additionally, he was also active as referee and on 30 May 1909, refereed the final of the German Cup between Phoenix Karlsruhe and the BFC Viktoria 1889. Shortly before the World War I, he founded the referee association Duisburg-Süd in the summer of 1914.

From 1904 to 1930 and from 1932 to 1934, Hinze was First Chairman of his Duisburg SpV. On 21 May 1905, he was elected first chairman of the German Football Association. In 1925, Hinze resigned and was appointed honorary chairman. Hinze was a businessman and took over his father's sales agency after his death.
