= Reichsliga =

Proposed football league in Weimar & Nazi Germany

The Reichsliga (German: [ˈʁaɪçsˌliːɡa], Reich League) was a proposed nationwide German association football league. First suggested in 1932 by German Football Association (DFB) president Felix Linnemann, the Reichsliga was essentially a forerunner of the Bundesliga, established as a national league (originally for West Germany) in 1963.

== History ==
Football in Germany after the First World War was very regionalised, leading to the top clubs in the German Reich playing in weak local competitions with clubs well below their own strength. Those clubs would then only truly be challenged during the German finals round. Linnemann wished to achieve a concentration of those clubs by forming a Reichsliga, like it existed in other countries, in which those clubs could play together. This however was vetoed by the powerful regional associations in 1932.

The discussion about the Reichsliga went hand in hand with the question of professionalism in Germany, with the DFB being a strong advocate for keeping the game amateur in the country. In October 1932 however, the federation made a sudden, unexpected turnaround and legalised professionalism. Before steps could be taken, in January 1933, the Nazis came to power and paid football was moved off the DFB agenda again.

From 1933, instead of the Reichsliga, the Nazis introduced 16 regional Gauligas. In 1938 however, the Reichsliga was once more contemplated after the freshly unified German-Austrian team, playing with high expectations at the 1938 FIFA World Cup was a complete disappointment, being knocked out in the first round. The embarrassment to Germany and its Nazi government caused the latter to approve plans for the consolidation of German football. The Reichsliga or, as an alternative, the reduction of the number of Gauligas from 16 to five was envisioned. The events of the Second World War however put a stop to all these plans and by the time the regime fell in 1945 the number of Gauligas had increased greatly in response to travel difficulties caused by the war and Nazi expansionism.

After 1945, the Oberligas were gradually formed in Allied-occupied Germany, first in the South and Berlin, later in the West and North, too, which had suffered greater damage to its infrastructure through strategic bombing during the war and was consequently slower to rebuild. Travel between occupation zones was difficult and the new leagues followed in their boundaries the limits of the Allied zones, putting a nationwide league out of question. In any case, such a league would not have been able to be called the Reichsliga anymore, as the German Reich had ceased to exist.

With the formation of the Federal Republic of Germany in 1949, soon requests for the Bundesliga were voiced and a national league was finally established in 1963.
