= Peco Bauwens =

German football player and administrator (1886–1963)

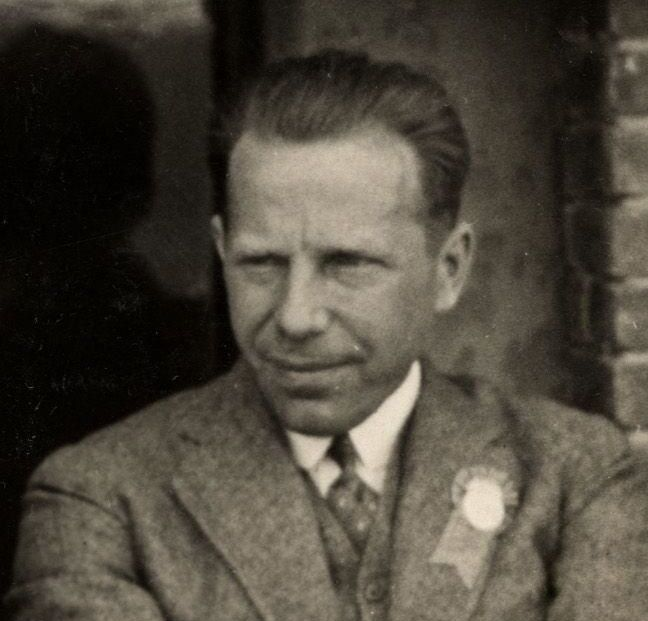
- Peco Bauwens (1928)

5th President of the DFB
- In office 21 January 1950 – 28 July 1962
- Preceded by: Felix Linnemann
- Succeeded by: Hermann Gösmann

Personal details
- Born: Peter Joseph Bauwens; 24 December 1886 Cologne, German Empire
- Died: 24 November 1963 (aged 76) Cologne, West Germany
Association football career
- Position: Forward
Senior career*
Years	Team	Apps	(Gls)
–1914	SC Brühl		
1904–1914	Kölner FC 1899		
International career
1910	Germany	1	(0)
- * Club domestic league appearances and goals
Refereeing career
Domestic
Years	League	Role
1920–1943	DFB	Referee
International
Years	League	Role
1922–1943	FIFA listed	Referee

Peter Joseph "Peco" Bauwens (24 December 1886 – 24 November 1963) was a German international footballer who played as a forward, referee and controversial administrator with the German Football Association (DFB). In total he was associated with the national game in that country from 1904 until 1962.

== Early career ==
Born in Cologne, Bauwens had only got into football as a result of a childhood accident; his mother having been encouraged to push him into the sport by a doctor. The suggestion worked, Bauwens leg (which had been threatened with amputation) was saved and the young player even went as far as turning out for the Germany national side in a 3-0 reverse to Belgium in May 1910. However, it was hardly auspicious, being substituted in the second half with the hosts already two goals down. Bauwens had been a member of the Cologne club from 1904.

== Refereeing ==
A member of the upper middle class, Bauwens reputedly attained his doctorate in law in Leipzig on 7 April 1914 but there are questions as to whether this was a genuinely acquired title. He was instrumental in assisting in the Post-War development of German football as a result of a role he assumed with the German-Belgian-Luxembourg Chamber of Commerce. At this time Bauwens decided upon becoming a referee. Bauwens became involved in a wide range of representative matches, and matches of national significance. He took charge of a Brazilian selection against Frankfurt-on-Main in which he awarded a penalty to the guest side only to be kissed by Baltazar the Brazilian player. He was also referee during the 1922 German Cup Final in which Hamburger SV and 1. FC Nürnberg played out two lengthy draws only for the second game to be abandoned when Nürnberg were reduced to six outfield players and a goalkeeper. The DFB awarded the title to Hamburg.

== Political situation ==
Professionally, he worked within the construction industry (and for a company that had dealings with the Third Reich and which, later, allegedly, operated a forced labour camp during the Second World War). His marriage to Elizabeth Gidion, from a Jewish family in Cologne, in 1920 (having two children with her) got him into trouble with the authorities; his company being banned from affiliation with the National Socialist Factory Organisation (NSDAP) in May 1933 a year after he had applied to join. The marriage suffered on account of the deteriorating political situation in Germany in the 1930s, and because of Bauwens entering into extramarital affairs (from which one daughter was conceived). Mrs Bauwens committed suicide on 16 April 1940.

== International referee ==
In total he was the referee in 82 international matches, including the famous 1931 international at Highbury between England and Spain (in which Ricardo Zamora conceded seven goals), both games on England's 1933 European tour and the 1936 Summer Olympics Gold medal match at the Olympia Stadion, in Berlin between Italy and Austria in front of 90,000. He became the first foreigner to referee a match in the British Home Championship when he took on Wales versus Ireland in 1934. Bauwens was also the referee during the Italy v England match on 14 May 1939 in Milan where Silvio Piola punched the ball into England's goal. The Italian Crown Prince was discouraged by Stanley Rous, as he then was, from stopping play to explain to Bauwens what had happened. He served on the executive committee of FIFA between 1932 and 1942 and became the fifth President of the DFB in 1950, an office he held until his death, a year before the setting up of the Bundesliga in 1962; his position as president being taken on by Hermann Gösmann.

== 1954 World Cup final ==
He was outspoken on occasion, being responsible for the break in transmission of the radio broadcast following the 1954 FIFA World Cup final, after what were perceived to have been nationalistic comments he made to the national team at the Löwenbräukeller beer hall in Munich following their victory in Bern. He said that 'the Gods in Heaven had marched side by side with the team', precipitating a critical response across mainland Europe. Der Spiegel reported: "During the victory party with he [sic] championship team Dr. Peco Bauwens, president of the DFB-German Soccer Association, conjured the old Germanic god of thunder, with a 'wild swell of Teutonic phrases.' He also condemned the envy of the romance (welsch) peoples and confirmed to the players that they had carried 'the flag in their hearts'" (113).

His coffin was accompanied by ex-national players Toni Turek, Fritz Walter, Werner Liebrich and Horst Eckel.
