= Ferdinand Hueppe =

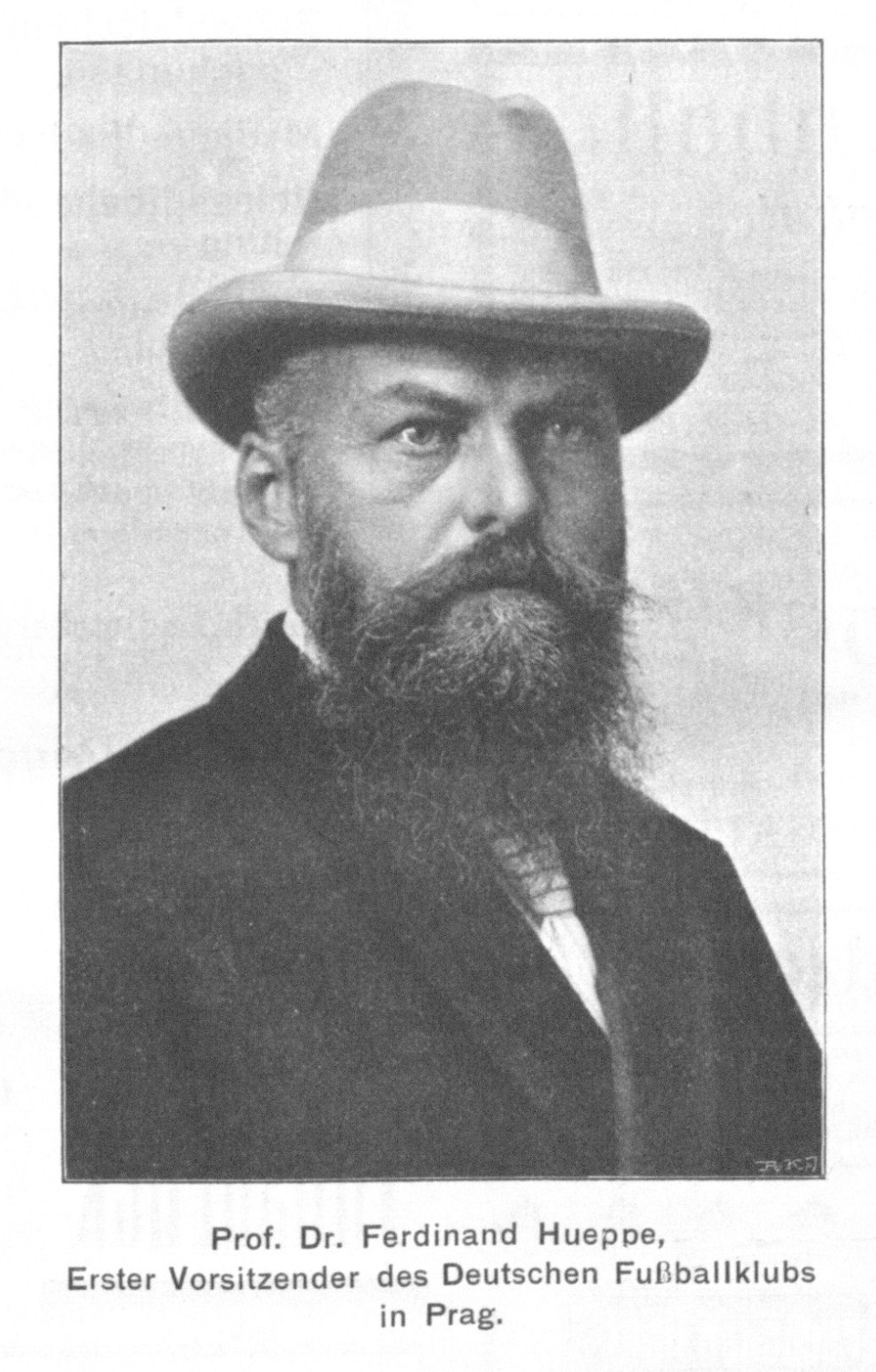
- Hueppe in 1902

1st President of the DFB
- In office 7 October 1900 – 1904
- Preceded by: Office established
- Succeeded by: Friedrich Wilhelm Nohe

Personal details
- Born: Ferdinand Adolph Theophil Hueppe; 24 August 1852 Neuwied-Heddesdorf, Kingdom of Prussia
- Died: 15 September 1938 (aged 86) Dresden, Nazi Germany
- Education: University of Berlin

Ferdinand Adolph Theophil Hueppe (24 August 1852 – 15 September 1938) was a German physician, bacteriologist and hygienist. From 1900 to 1904, he was the first Deutscher Fußball-Bund (DFB, German Football Association) president.

== Biography ==
From 1872 to 1876, Hueppe studied medicine at the University of Berlin, afterwards serving as a military surgeon. From 1880 to 1884 he was a member of bacteriologist Robert Koch's staff in Berlin, and later worked at Carl Remigius Fresenius' institute (the Chemischen Institut Fresenius) in Wiesbaden. From 1889 to 1912 he was a professor at Charles University in Prague.

Hueppe is remembered for his pioneer investigations of hormesis in regards to chemical stimulation/inhibition of bacterial growth. The eponymous "Hueppe’s rule" is an historical term synonymous with hormesis.

Hueppe promoted a völkisch type of racial hygiene in which Aryans and Jews were considered separate races. He advocated Arnold Rikli's light and air baths as well as physical exercise.

== Criticism of vegetarianism ==
Hueppe opposed vegetarianism and characterized German vegetarians as "feminized men" who degenerated the Aryan race. He argued that "Powerful Aryan elites" risked degeneration if they turned away from the omnivorous diet that had made their bodies and nation strong. Hueppe stated that the earliest humans were meat eaters and that modern humans survive best on an omnivorous diet because a vegetarian diet is excessive in carbohydrates and lacks in protein. He described vegetarians as the "victims of an unnatural mode of existence".

== Publications ==
His book on bacterial research, Die methoden der bakterien-forschung, was later translated into English and published in 1886 with the title "The methods of bacteriological investigation". Other noted efforts by Hueppe include:

- Naturwissenschaftliche Einführung in der Bakteriologie, 1896 – Natural sciences introduction to bacteriology.
- Der moderne Vegetarianismus 1900 – Modern vegetarianism.
- Hygiene der Körperübungen, 1922 – Hygiene associated with physical exercise.
