= SC Altenkessel =

German football club

- Full name: Sportclub 07 Altenkessel e.V.
- Founded: 1907
- Ground: Großwald
- League: Landesliga Saarland (VIII)
- 2015–16: Bezirksliga Südsaar (IX), 1st ↑
Home colours	Away colours

SC Altenkessel is a German football club from the district of Altenkessel in the city of Saarbrücken, Saarland. The club was briefly part of first-division play during World War II and after the war played in the Saarlandliga when the state of Saarland was occupied by the French.

== History ==
The club was established in 1907 as Sportverein Borussia Altenkessel and in 1910 adopted the name Sportclub 07 Altenkessel. They were joined by the member ship of Fußball-Club 1905 Neudorf in 1912.

In 1942 SC won a promotion round playoff to advance to the Gauliga Westmark, one of 16 regional top flight divisions formed in the 1933 reorganization of German football under the Third Reich. The club's 1942–43 campaign ended in relegation after a 12th-place result. As the war progressed and turned against Germany teams were often merged into wartime sides known as Kriegspielgemeinschaft in order to deal with player shortages. After 17 October 1943 SC played alongside Fußballverein Saarbrücken as part of KSG Saarbrücken until war's end.

After the conflict SC won promotion for the 1950–51 season to the regional first division Saarlandliga which had emerged as a separate football competition as a result of attempts by the French to annex the state of Saarland. The club earned a 12th-place finish and the following year became part of the Amateurliga Saarland when the region's football clubs rejoined German competition. A 4th-place result in the 1951–52 campaign won SC a place in the 2. Liga Südwest (II) where they played for two seasons before being relegated.

Between 1954 and 1961 the Altenkessel side was part of the Amateurliga Saarland (III) where they generally earned mid-table results. In 1961 they slipped to the 2. Amateurliga Saar, Gruppe West (IV) and in 1964 slipped to lower-tier play. In 1974, the reemerged in the Bezirksliga Saarland, Gruppe West (IV) for a three-year turn before appearing in the Landesliga Südwest (V) following a restructuring of the country's competition in 1978. After a series of upper table finishes they captured the division title in 1982 and advanced to the Verbandsliga Saarland (IV). They were demoted in 1987 after several lower table finishes. They narrowly escaped relegation from the Landesliga Saarland, Gruppe Südwest (V) in 1991, but were sent down the following year after finishing last. After a single season turn in the Bezirksliga Saarland, Gruppe Süd SC slipped out of sight into lower level local competition. After a league championship in the Kreisliga A Halberg (X) in 2015 the club was promoted to the Bezirksliga, where another championship in 2016 took the club up to the Landesliga.

== Honours ==
- Bezirksliga Südsaar
  - Champions: 2015–16
