= Guillermo Cañedo de la Bárcena =

Mexican entrepreneur and football manager

Guillermo Cañedo

President of the Mexican Football Federation
- In office 19 de junio de 1960 – 15 de octubre de 1970
- Preceded by: Moisés Estrada
- Succeeded by: José Luis Pérez Noriega

President of the Organización de Televisión Iberoamericana
- In office 1971–1997
- Preceded by: Seat established
- Succeeded by: Miguel Alemán Velasco

Personal details
- Born: Guillermo de Jesus Cañedo de la Bárcena; 4 June 1920 Guadalajara, Mexico
- Died: 20 January 1997 (aged 76) Mexico City, Mexico

Guillermo Cañedo de la Bárcena (June 4, 1920 – January 20, 1997) was a Mexican entrepreneur, football manager, and television executive.

Cañedo was President of Club Atlético Zacatepec from 1954 to 1961; President of Club América from 1961 to 1981; President of the Mexican Football Federation from 1960 to 1970; and President of the Organización de Televisión Iberoamericana (OTI) from 1971 to 1997.

Cañedo was the President of the organizing committee for the 1970 and 1986 FIFA World Cups.

In 1993, he was awarded the Olympic Order by the International Olympic Committee (IOC); and in 1998, he received the FIFA Order of Merit posthumous by FIFA.

Preceded by Andrew Stephen	FIFA World Cup Chief Organizer; 1970	Succeeded by Hermann Gösmann
