= Introduction of the Bundesliga =

Creation of German football league

The Introduction of the Bundesliga was the long-debated step of establishing a top-level association football league in Germany in 1963. The new league, the Bundesliga, played its first season in 1963–64 and continues to be the highest league in the country. Its introduction reduced the number of first division teams in Germany from 74 to 16 and finally eliminated the problem of the top-teams having to play uncompetitive teams in regional leagues.

While the league was introduced in 1963, plans and suggestions for a national league date back as far as the early 1930s, when a Reichsliga was proposed. The process of forming such a league went hand-in-hand with the discussion over professionalism in German football. While a limited form of professionalism was approved in 1932 it was, because of the rise of the Nazis to power in 1933, not implemented until after the Second World War.

== History ==
=== The Reichsliga before 1933 ===
Germany introduced a national championship in 1903 which, for the first 60 years, was played in a knockout format, whereby the top clubs of the regional football championships would qualify for the finals. The season annually culminated in a final, of which VfB Leipzig's 7–2 win over Deutscher FC Prag in 1903 was the first while Borussia Dortmund's 1963 victory over 1. FC Köln was to be the last.

Quite early on in the history of German football, attempts were made to form a single-division national league to replace the multitude of regional top-level leagues. The driving force behind this was the idea of having a league which would include only the best teams in the country, contrary to the original system where strong clubs would play together with weaker ones in small local competitions and would only be truly challenged at the German finals round.

Football in Germany, in the 1920s and 1930s, was strictly amateur and the German Football Association, the DFB, strove to keep it this way. The establishing of a top league, the Reichsliga, was seen as going hand in hand with the legalisation of professionalism, as the clubs saw these two steps as serving a common goal. The DFB however remained fiercely anti-professionalism. The DFB outlawed games between German clubs and the professional clubs from Austria, banned players who were found to have accepted any form of payment and even banned whole teams, like FC Schalke 04. Felix Linnemann, president of the DFB at the time, wished for the introduction of the Reichsliga but failed to get the motion passed by the regional associations in 1932.

The clubs from the West of Germany, especially the industrialised Ruhr region, were the most vocal in advocating professionalism and the Reichsliga. To general surprise, the annual convention of the DFB on 16 October 1932 in Wiesbaden passed a resolution to permit professionalism, without the subject even having been on the list of items to debate and after years of opposition. It was decided to develop a frame work in which professional football could be organised and a clear separation between professional and amateur football in the country could be achieved.

=== During Nazi rule ===
All this came to nought on 30 January 1933, when the Nazis took power in Germany. The DFB was converted to the new Reichsamt Fußball and the German football landscape reorganised into 16 Gaue with a regional league, the Gauliga, on top of each. Professionalism and the Reichsliga were out of question and the debate silenced.

While professionalism experienced another blow in 1938 with the Anschluss of Austria and the outlawing of the professional league there, the Reichsliga soon returned on the agenda. The freshly unified German-Austrian team, playing with high expectations at the 1938 FIFA World Cup was a complete disappointment, being knocked out in the first round. The embarrassment to Germany and its Nazi government caused the latter to approve plans for the concentration of forces in German football. The Reichsliga or, as an alternative, the reduction of the number of Gauligas from 16 to five was envisioned. The events of the Second World War however put a stop to all these plans, and by the time the regime fell in 1945 the number of Gauligas had greatly expanded because of travel difficulties caused by the effects of the war and Nazi expansionism.

=== Post-war attempts ===
The year 1945 brought a restart for German football. New leagues were gradually formed in Allied-occupied Germany, first in the South and Berlin, later in the West and North, too, which had suffered greater damage to its infrastructure through strategic bombing during the war. Travel between occupation zones was difficult and the new leagues followed in their boundaries the limits of the Allied zones. In the US zone, the Oberliga Süd was established, in the French zone the Oberliga Südwest and in the British the Oberliga Nord and Oberliga West. The Oberliga Berlin, for a time, covered all four occupation zones of Berlin but the eastern clubs later left. In the Soviet zone, a separate league was formed, later to become the DDR-Oberliga. What did change in German football was the introduction of a form of semi-professionalism, the Vertragsspieler (Contract player). Players in the top leagues were now allowed a payment of DM 120 per month, later raised to 400. All this half-way step however achieved was that players would be paid their permissible wage over the table and extra money under the table through hidden accounts.

West Germany's surprise victory at the 1954 FIFA World Cup led the team's coach, Sepp Herberger, to demand a national league once more. Herberger had already been a driving force of this move in the late 1930s. Ironically, his very success in Switzerland in 1954 spoke against him, with opposition to the league claiming that the current system was the reason for Germany's success in the first place.

Herberger's dream of a national league, now titled the Bundesliga, was finally achieved in 1959, but in the wrong sport, for him, with the establishment of the Ice hockey Bundesliga as the first league to carry that name.

Herberger found support for his plans in Hermann Neuberger, at the time a DFB official and later to become its chairman, and Franz Kremer, chairman of the 1. FC Köln. Kremer became the voice of the powerful clubs in the West, raising the issue at every annual convention of the German association. In 1957, a twelve-men commission was formed to investigate the Bundesliga question, in April 1958 a special conference of the DFB declined the introduction of the league once more. In 1960, the football association of the Saarland, Neuberger's home region, demanded a reduction of top-level clubs without clearly mentioning the word Bundesliga, a step that was approved but its execution procrastinated.

=== Approval ===
Disillusioned with the slow process of implementing this reduction, the clubs from the West once more raised a motion, to introduce the Bundesliga in 1963, which was approved. Germany's poor performance at the 1962 FIFA World Cup greatly helped the cause, like it did in 1938. On 28 July 1962, at the annual convention of the DFB in the Westfalenhalle, Dortmund, at 17:45, the introduction of the Bundesliga was officially approved with 103 votes for the league and 26 against. Parallel to this, new guidelines for professionalism were approved, too, raising the permissible monthly income to DM 1,200, including bonuses. For certain, specially gifted players, exceptions could be applied for and granted to pay them more. In particular, 1. FC Nürnberg, which had been a strong opposing force to the Bundesliga, was ironically the first to apply for this exception for 12 of its players.

On 24 August 1963, the first round of the new Bundesliga was played, enthusiastically welcomed as "finals atmosphere every weekend" by kicker Sportmagazin.

== The qualifying process for the Bundesliga ==
=== Qualifying system ===
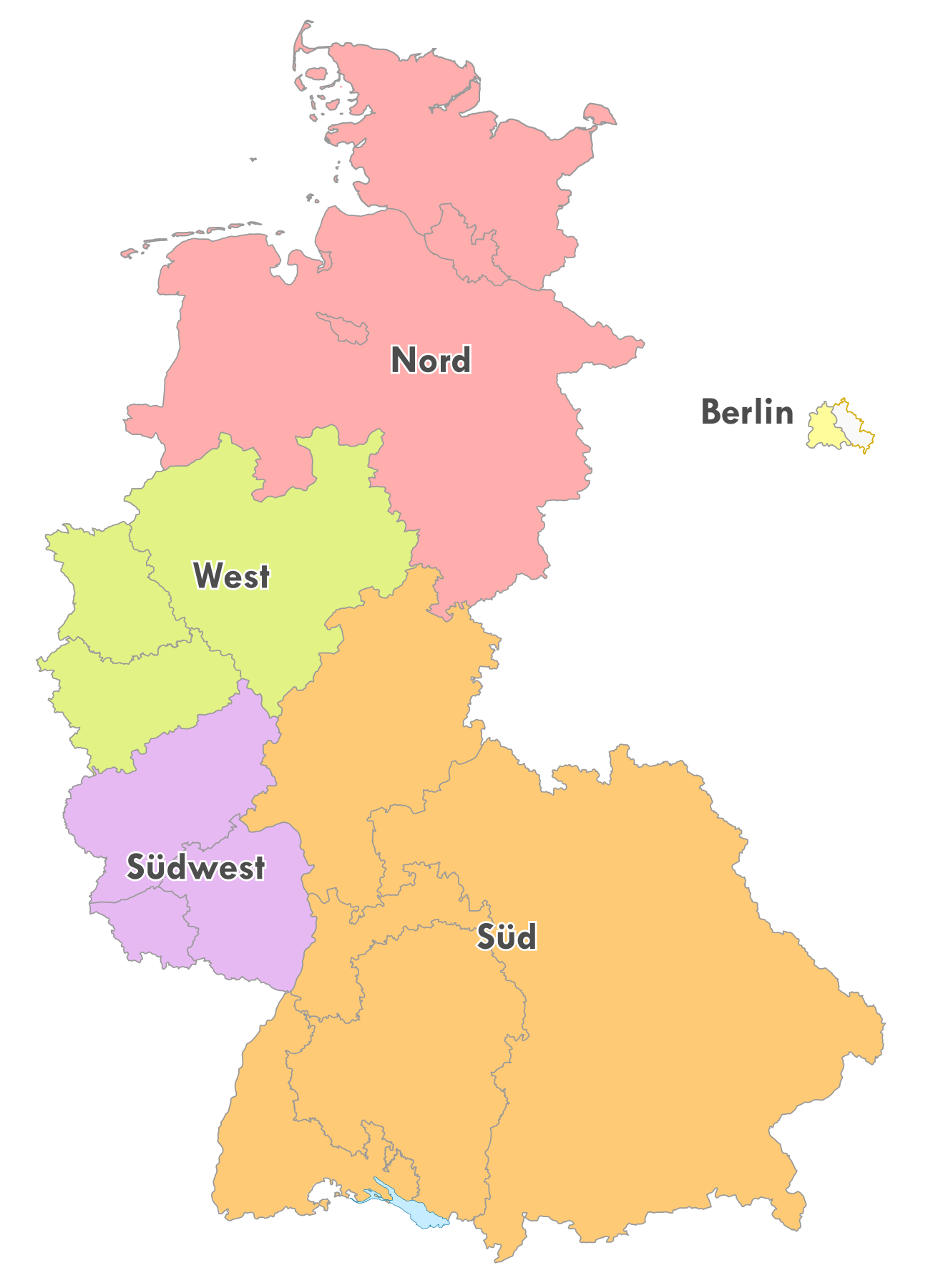
Map of the five German Oberligas and East Germany in 1963

The DFB received 46 applications from clubs from the five Oberligen to fill the 16 available spots in the new league, which had to be submitted by 1 December 1962. Clubs from the sixth German Oberliga, the highest league in East Germany, could not and would not have been permitted to apply. Those would join the Bundesliga only after the German reunion, in 1991.

Of the 46, two soon withdrew their application. The rest were judged by financial criteria as well as by on-the-field performance over the previous ten seasons. In January 1963, the applications of 15 clubs were rejected, leaving 29 in the running. The weeding out of the last 13 that would not get a Bundesliga place in 1963 was fiercely contested, to the point that Kickers Offenbach and Alemannia Aachen took their rejection to court, without success. Both would however later gain entry to the league for short periods.

The qualifying system for the new league was fairly complex. The league placings of the clubs playing in the Oberligen for the last ten seasons were taken into consideration, whereby results from 1952 to 1955 counted once, results from 1955 to 1959 counted double and results from 1959 to 1963 triple. A first-place finish was awarded 16 points, a sixteenth place one point. A German championship, 20 points, or runners-up spot and DFB-Pokal win, 10 points, were also rewarded with points. However, the 1963 editions of those two competitions were not taken into calculation any more. The five Oberliga champions of the 1962–63 season were granted direct access to the Bundesliga. Later on, a special scenario also existed for the case that Borussia Neunkirchen would reach the German championship final, in which case the club would have gained entry to the league as a 17th team, as the two slots granted to the Southwest had already been allocated at the time. The idea that the German champions or runners-up might have to enter the second division did obviously not appeal to the DFB. To keep the numbers even, the 18th spot would then have been allocated to the South. An additional condition that was laid down was that no city could be represented by more than one club. This condition, as Hamburger SV, TSV 1860 Munich and 1. FC Köln each won their leagues and qualified automatically meant, that their city rivals FC St. Pauli, FC Bayern Munich and Viktoria Köln could qualify under no circumstances once those three clubs had sealed their championships.

Clubs within the same Oberliga that were separated by less than 50 points were considered on equal rank and the 1962–63 placing was used to determine the qualified team.

=== Oberliga Nord ===
The breakdown for the five Oberligas was as follows:

- Oberliga Nord: Eight clubs applied for Bundesliga membership, of those Hamburger SV and Werder Bremen qualified early (11 January 1963). The third place went to Eintracht Braunschweig due to their third-place finish in 1962–63 even though their overall points put them in seventh spot in the ranking, but within 50 points of third-placed VfL Osnabrück. Osnabrück finished seventh in 1962–63.

Points table:

Rank	Club	Points 1952 to 1963	Place in 1962–63
1	Hamburger SV ^{‡}	518	1
2	Werder Bremen	396	2
3	VfL Osnabrück	313	7
4	Hannover 96	309	9
5	FC St Pauli	303	6
6	Holstein Kiel	294	5
7	Eintracht Braunschweig	276	3
8	Arminia Hannover	103	10

=== Oberliga West ===
- Oberliga West: All Oberliga West clubs except TSV Marl-Hüls applied for Bundesliga membership. Borussia Dortmund, 1. FC Köln and FC Schalke 04 qualified early. Meidericher SV and Preußen Münster qualified even though both clubs had less points than Alemannia Aachen. Aachen finished fifth, Meidericher SV came in fourth and Preußen Münster earned a third-place finish in 1962–63.

Points table:

Rank	Club	Points 1952 to 1963	Place in 1962–63
1	1. FC Köln ^{‡}	466	1
2	Borussia Dortmund	440	2
3	FC Schalke 04	396	6
4	Alemannia Aachen	285	5
5	Preußen Münster	251	4
6	Meidericher SV	250	3
7	Fortuna Düsseldorf	225	13
8	Westfalia Herne	222	14
9	Viktoria Köln	201	8
10	Schwarz-Weiß Essen	167	7
11	Rot-Weiß Oberhausen	154	10
12	Borussia Mönchengladbach	155	11
13	Hamborn 07	101	12
14	Bayer Leverkusen	88	9
15	Wuppertaler SV	52	15

=== Oberliga Berlin ===
- Oberliga Berlin: Only three clubs applied for the one available spot, Hertha BSC Berlin qualified early.

Points table:

Rank	Club	Points 1952 to 1963	Place in 1962–63
1	Hertha BSC Berlin ^{‡}	346	1
2	Tasmania 1900 Berlin	324	2
3	Viktoria 89 Berlin	318	9

=== Oberliga Süd ===
- Oberliga Süd: Of the thirteen clubs from this league applying, the 1. FC Nürnberg and Eintracht Frankfurt qualified early. Karlsruher SC and VfB Stuttgart held third and fourth place in the overall points ranking. Kickers Offenbach and FC Bayern Munich missed out to TSV 1860 Munich due to the latter winning the league in 1962–63 even though 1860 were 153 points behind Offenbach and 59 behind FC Bayern.

Points table:

Rank	Club	Points 1952 to 1963	Place in 1962–63
1	1. FC Nürnberg	447	2
2	Eintracht Frankfurt	420	4
3	Karlsruher SC	419	5
4	VfB Stuttgart	408	6
5	Kickers Offenbach	382	7
6	FC Bayern Munich	288	3
7	TSV 1860 Munich ^{‡}	229	1
8	VfR Mannheim	227	12
9	SpVgg Fürth	224	9
10	1. FC Schweinfurt 05	185	11
11	FC Bayern Hof	90	13
12	TSV Schwaben Augsburg	61	15
13	KSV Hessen Kassel	36	10

=== Oberliga Südwest ===
- Oberliga Südwest: Of the seven clubs from the league applying, the 1. FC Saarbrücken qualified early even though FK Pirmasens and Borussia Neunkirchen were less than ten points behind in the overall ranking and finished better in 1962–63. The rumour persists that Saarbrücken was chosen because it was from the home state of the later DFB chairman Hermann Neuberger (chairman from 1975 to 1992), the Saarland, a very influential figure in German football. The DFB justified the choice of the 1. FCS with the fact that the club had a superior infrastructure to the other two. The 1. FC Kaiserslautern also qualified.

Points table:

Rank	Club	Points 1952 to 1963	Place in 1962–63
1	1. FC Kaiserslautern ^{‡}	464	1
2	1. FC Saarbrücken	384	5
3	FK Pirmasens	382	3
4	Borussia Neunkirchen	376	2
5	Wormatia Worms	278	4
6	Saar 05 Saarbrücken	229	9
7	Sportfreunde Saarbrücken	160	6

=== Key ===
Club was one of the nine selected for the Bundesliga on 11 January 1963.	Club was one of the 20 taken into final selection and gained entry to the league.	Club was one of the 20 taken into final selection but failed to gain entry to the league.	Club was one of the 15 applicants which were removed from final selection.	Club withdrew application.

- ^{‡} Denotes directly qualified league champion.

== Changes to the league system ==
The changes to the league system mainly affected the first tier, where the number of leagues was reduced from five to one.

The second tier mainly experienced an influx of former Oberliga clubs that failed to gain entry to the Bundesliga or had not applied in the first place. The South, West and Southwest saw their 2nd Oberligas simply renamed to Regionalliga. In Berlin and the North, where there had not been a 2nd Oberliga, Regionalligas were formed. Especially for the North, that meant that the second tier was now formed of only one league instead of five. In regards to promotion to the first tier, which had been automatic until 1963, the number of tier-two leagues now made such a system impossible. Instead, the league champions and, except Berlin, the runners-up, entered a promotion round to determine the two promoted teams. A pre-qualifying was held to reduce the number of teams from nine to eight, these eight would then play in two groups of four a home-and-away schedule. The two group winners were then promoted. After 1966, this was expanded to ten teams in two groups of five, with the Berlin runners-up now also qualifying. This system was to remain in place until the next reform of the German league system in 1974, when the 2nd Bundesligas were introduced.

The third tier in turn experienced an influx of former 2nd Oberliga teams that failed to make the cut for the Regionalligas. In Bavaria and the Rhineland, the Amateurliga, which had operated in two regional division, merged into a single division. The Northern Amateurligas, formerly on the second tier, now slipped to the third, as happened in Berlin.

=== The league system 1962–63 ===
The top three divisions of the league system in the last season before the introduction of the Bundesliga:

Level	League(s)/Division(s)				
I	Oberliga Berlin; 10 clubs 1 championship round	Oberliga Nord; 16 clubs 2 championship round	Oberliga West; 16 clubs 2 championship round	Oberliga Südwest; 16 clubs 2 championship round	Oberliga Süd; 16 clubs 2 championship round
II	Amateurliga Berlin; 16 clubs	Amateurliga Bremen; 15 clubs Amateurliga Hamburg; 16 clubs Amateuroberliga Niedersachsen West; 16 clubs Amateuroberliga Niedersachsen Ost; 16 clubs Amateurliga Schleswig-Holstein; 16 clubs	2nd Oberliga West; 16 clubs	2nd Oberliga Südwest; 16 clubs	2nd Oberliga Süd; 18 clubs
III	?	?	Verbandsliga Mittelrhein; 15 clubs Verbandsliga Niederrhein; 16 clubs Verbandsliga Westfalen Nordost; 15 clubs Verbandsliga Westfalen Südwest; 15 clubs	Amateurliga Rheinland West; 13 clubs Amateurliga Rheinland Ost; 13 clubs Amateurliga Saarland; 14 clubs Amateurliga Südwest; 16 clubs	Amateurliga Bayern Nord; 17 clubs Amateurliga Bayern Süd; 17 clubs Amateurliga Hessen; 16 clubs Amateurliga Nordwürttemberg; 16 clubs Amateurliga Schwarzwald-Bodensee; 16 clubs Amateurliga Nordbaden; 16 clubs Amateurliga Südbaden; 16 clubs

=== The league system 1963–64 ===
The top three divisions of the league system in the season after the introduction of the Bundesliga:

Level	League(s)/Division(s)				
I	Bundesliga; 16 clubs 2 relegations				
II	Regionalliga Berlin; 10 clubs 1 promotion round 1 relegation	Regionalliga Nord; 18 clubs 2 promotion round 2 relegations	Regionalliga West; 20 clubs 2 promotion round 5 relegations	Regionalliga Südwest; 20 clubs 2 promotion round 3 relegations	Regionalliga Süd; 20 clubs 2 promotion round 4 relegations
III	Amateurliga Berlin; 16 clubs	Amateurliga Bremen; 15 clubs Landesliga Hamburg; 15 clubs Amateuroberliga Niedersachsen West; 15 clubs Amateuroberliga Niedersachsen Ost; 15 clubs Amateurliga Schleswig-Holstein; 16 clubs	Verbandsliga Mittelrhein; 16 clubs Verbandsliga Niederrhein; 18 clubs Verbandsliga Westfalen Nordost; 17 clubs Verbandsliga Westfalen Südwest; 16 clubs	Amateurliga Rheinland; 16 clubs Amateurliga Saarland; 18 clubs Amateurliga Südwest; 19 clubs	Amateurliga Bayern; 18 clubs Amateurliga Hessen; 19 clubs Amateurliga Nordwürttemberg; 17 clubs Amateurliga Schwarzwald-Bodensee; 16 clubs Amateurliga Nordbaden; 16 clubs Amateurliga Südbaden; 16 clubs

== Aftermath ==
After financial irregularities in the 1964–65 season, Hertha BSC Berlin were relegated despite not having finished in a relegation spot. Wishing to continue the league's presence in Berlin, the DFB elevated third-placed Regionalliga side Tasmania 1900 Berlin to the Bundesliga without the side actually having qualified and thereby enlarging the league to 18 teams almost by accident, a format it continued from then on except for one season.

In 1991, 28 years after its interception, the Bundesliga finally became a league for all of Germany. After the German reunion, two clubs from the east, FC Hansa Rostock and Dynamo Dresden joined the league for the 1991–92 season and caused a one-off expansion of the league to 20 teams.

The 58 top-level Oberliga clubs from 1962 to 1963 that were not selected for the Bundesliga were mostly grouped in the new Regionalligas. Only in Berlin did the bottom two teams, Viktoria 89 Berlin and SC Tegel have to drop from the first to the third tier, while in the Southwest Eintracht Kreuznach also found itself dropping to the Amateurliga.

In 1974 another step was taken to professionalise German football when the 2. Bundesliga was established.
