= Hermann Gösmann =

German lawyer (1904–1979)

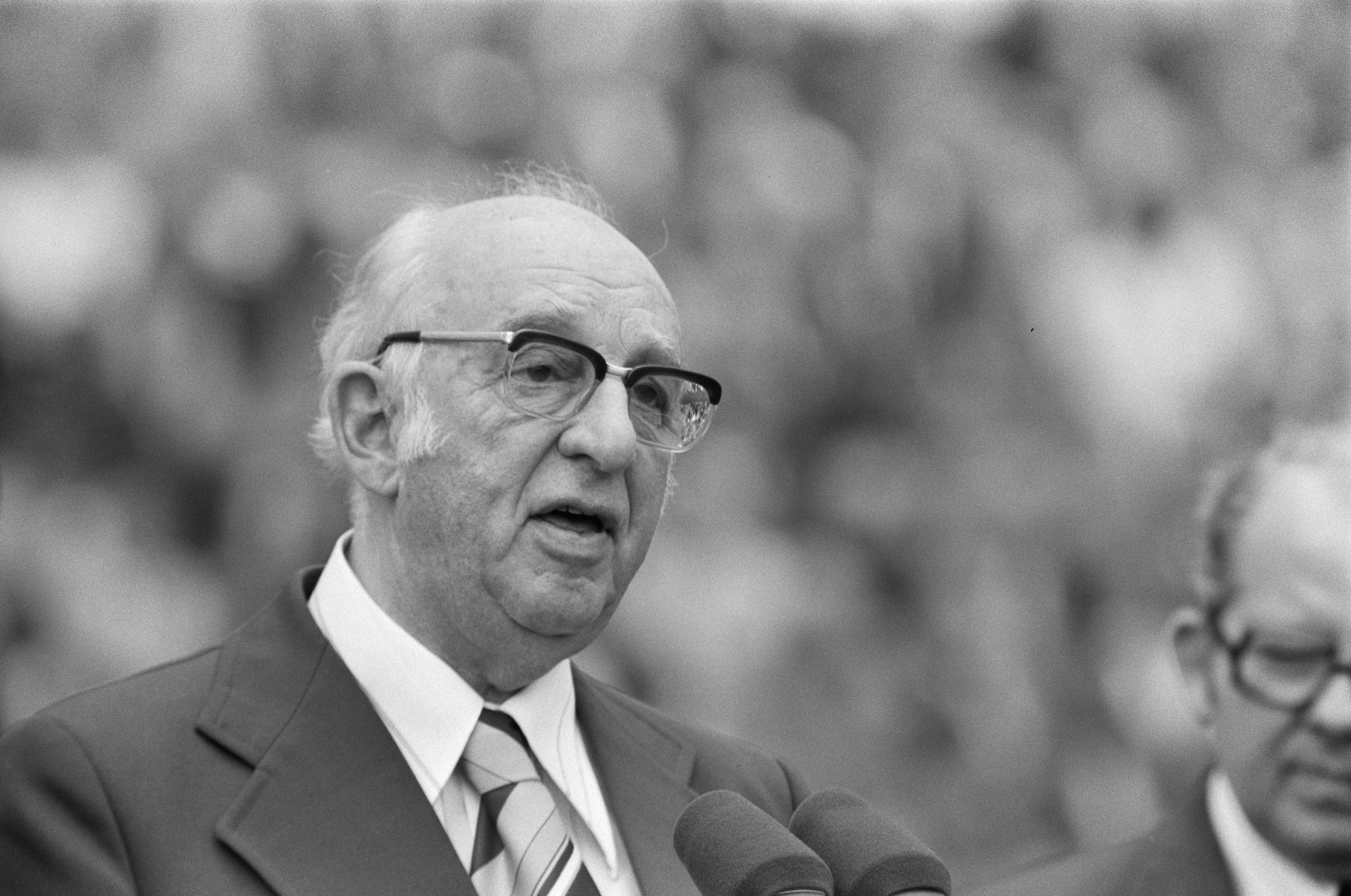
- Gösmann at 1974 FIFA World Cup Final in Munich

6th President of the DFB
- In office 28 July 1962 – 25 October 1975
- Preceded by: Peco Bauwens
- Succeeded by: Hermann Neuberger

Personal details
- Born: 9 January 1904 Ibbenbüren, German Empire
- Died: 21 January 1979 (aged 75) Osnabrück, West Germany
- Occupation: Lawyer

Hermann Gösmann (9 January 1904 – 21 January 1979) was a German lawyer and football administrator who was president of the German Football Association (German: Deutscher Fußball-Bund, DFB) from 1962 to 1975.

Along with Franz Kremer, then president of 1. FC Köln, and Hermann Neuberger (Gösmann's eventual successor), he participated in the founding of the Bundesliga. Gösmann was elected president during a DFB-Bundestag on July 28 1962 in the Westfalenhallen in Dortmund. It was during this Bundestag that the Bundesliga was founded.

The 1971 Bundesliga scandal occurred during his tenure. Gösmann also held international offices. In 1964, he was elected to the UEFA Executive Committee and took over as chair of the UEFA Amateur Commission. Four years later, he was reelected. Gösmann died at the age of 75 in Osnabrück due to a pulmonary embolism. He was buried in the Heger cemetery in the same city.

Preceded by Guillermo Cañedo de la Bárcena	FIFA World Cup Chief Organizer; 1974	Succeeded by Alfredo Francisco Cantilo
