= SC Westend 1901 =

German football club

- Full name: Sport Club Westend 1901 e.V.
- Founded: 1901
- Ground: Sportanlage Jungfernheide
- Capacity: 3,000
- Chairman: Volker Rau
- Head Coach: Charly Köhn
- League: Kreisliga A Berlin (IX)
- 2015–16: Bezirksliga Berlin Group 1, 15th (relegated)
- Website: http://www.westend1901.de/
Home colours	Away colours

SC Westend 1901 is a German association football club from the city of Berlin. The club's greatest success has been promotion to the tier one Oberliga Berlin in 1950 where it played for two seasons. After the introduction of the Bundesliga in 1963 the club made one more appearance in the second tier, playing in the Regionalliga Berlin in 1973–74.

The club also made a single appearance in the DFB-Pokal, the German Cup, in 1974–75, losing to 5–1 to Eintracht Nordhorn in the first round.

== History ==
While the club traces its origins back to 1901 the current club, SC Westend 1901, was formed in 1933 when Charlottenburger FC 01 Concordia merged with Charlottenburger FC Viktoria to form Charlottenburger FC 1901. In 1945, after the Second World War, Charlottenburger FC became SG Charlottenburg-Nord which temporarily adopted the name SG Westend Berlin from 1946 to 1948. A year after reverting to its former name the club finally became SC Westend 1901 in 1949.

After the frequent name changes in the post-war era, the club finished runners-up in the tier two Amateurliga Berlin in 1950 and thereby earned promotion to the Oberliga Berlin. It played at this level for two seasons, finishing tenth out of 14 clubs but came second-last the season after and was relegated back to the Amateurliga.

Westend became a lower table side in the Amateurliga and was relegated from this level, too, in 1956. The club's absence from the league was a lengthy one, returning 16 seasons later in 1972 by which time the league had dropped to third tier. The club finished runners-up in the league in 1972–73 and thereby earned promotion to the tier two Regionalliga Berlin. Westend finished in fifth place in 1973–74 but the league was disbanded at the end of the season in favor of the new 2. Bundesliga and the club consequently had to drop back to the third tier.

Playing in the new tier three Oberliga Berlin Westend initially remained a strong side, finishing third in 1975 and 1976. After this the club first dropped into the mid field of the table and then towards the relegation zone, eventually being relegated in 1983. It made a brief one season return in 1985–86 but then permanently left the third tier of German football. In 1989 another drop followed when the club was relegated from the Landesliga Berlin. After a short stint back in the Landesliga in the early 1990s the club permanently dropped out of the higher amateur leagues of Berlin.

Since the start of the new millennium the fortunes of the club have mixed, falling as far as the tier ten Kreisliga B in 2008 but returning to the tier eight Bezirksliga again in 2011.

== Honours ==
The club's honours:

- Amateurliga Berlin
  - Runners-up: 1949–50, 1972–73

== Recent seasons ==
The recent season-by-season performance of the club:

Season	Division	Tier	Position
2003–04	Bezirksliga Berlin Group 3	VII	12th
2004–05	Bezirksliga Berlin Group 1	VII	10th
2005–06	Bezirksliga Berlin Group 2	VII	15th ↓
2006–07	Kreisliga A Berlin Group 1	VIII	10th
2007–08	Kreisliga A Berlin Group 3	VIII	15th ↓
2008–09	Kreisliga B Berlin Group 3	X	4th
2009–10	Kreisliga B Berlin Group 3	X	1st ↑
2010–11	Kreisliga A Berlin Group 3	IX	3rd ↑
2011–12	Bezirksliga Berlin Group 2	VIII	4th
2012–13	Bezirksliga Berlin Group 3	VIII	8th
2013–14	Bezirksliga Berlin Group 2	VIII	7th
2014–15	Bezirksliga Berlin Group 3	VIII	10th
2015–16	Bezirksliga Berlin Group 1	VIII	15th ↓
2016–17	Kreisliga A Berlin	IX	

- With the introduction of the Regionalligas in 1994 and the 3. Liga in 2008 as the new third tier, below the 2. Bundesliga, all leagues below dropped one tier.

↑ Promoted	↓ Relegated
