= Edi Kirschner =

German footballer (born 1953)

Personal information
- Full name: Eduard Kirschner
- Date of birth: 9 September 1953 (age 73)
- Height: 1.87 m (6 ft 2 in)
- Position: Striker

Youth career
- 1963–1975: SV Tettenweis

Senior career*
Years	Team	Apps	(Gls)
1975–1976	FC Passau	26	(32)
1976–1978	Bayern Munich (A)	40	(19)
1976–1978	Bayern Munich	13	(0)
1978–1980	SpVgg Fürth	64	(48)
1980–1981	Edmonton Drillers	62	(32)
1982	Fort Lauderdale Strikers	26	(5)
1982–1983	FC Augsburg	21	(8)
1983–1985	Fortuna Köln	60	(8)
1985–1989	FC Passau	105	(60)
Total		417	(213)
- * Club domestic league appearances and goals

Eduard "Edi" Kirschner (born 9 September 1953) is a German former professional footballer who played as a striker. Active in both Germany and North America between 1975 and 1985, Kirschner made over 250 career league appearances, scoring over 100 goals.

== Career ==
Kirschner played in Germany for FC Passau, Bayern Munich, SpVgg Fürth, FC Augsburg and Fortuna Köln, and in the North American Soccer League for the Edmonton Drillers and the Fort Lauderdale Strikers.

In the 1978–79 season of the 2. Bundesliga Süd Kirschner was the top-scorer with 33 goals.
