= SpVgg Hellas-Nordwest 04 =

German football club

- Full name: SpVgg Hellas-Nordwest 04 e.V.
- Founded: 1904
- Dissolved: 2017 (merger with Berlin Türkspor)
- Ground: Sportplatz Heckerdamm
- Capacity: 2,000

SpVgg Hellas-Nordwest 04 was a German football club from the district of Charlottenburg-Nord in Berlin.

== History ==
It was established in 1904 as Sportclub Hellas 04 Berlin. They played their inaugural season in the Verband Berliner Athletik-Vereine before joining the Verband Berliner Ballspielvereine in 1905. They were joined in 1911 by SC Berlin 06 and on 15 November 1911 by Hansa 07 Berlin.

The team was an undistinguished city side and disappeared briefly after World War II when occupying Allied authorities ordered the dissolution of organizations across the country, including sports and football clubs. Prior to the end of the war, in 1944, Hellas played alongside Sportvereinigung Nordwest Berlin 1912 as part of a Kriegspielgemeinschaft – a club formed up out of two or more sides as a result of wartime player shortages.

SV Nordwest was established on 1 March 1912 and on 13 August 1919 merged with SpVgg Nord-West 13 Berlin to form Berliner SpVgg Nord-West 12. In 1933, SpVgg 12 merged with SpVgg Bamag Berlin, itself the product of an earlier merger between SuS Bamag Berlin and SV GIC Berlin, to create SpVgg Nordwest-Bamag Berlin. The club was renamed SpVgg Nordwest Berlin 1912 in 1939.

Hellas and Nordwest amalgamated after the war, playing as SG Tiergarten-Nordwest until being renamed SV Hellas-Nordwest in 1947. The club played lower division city football until winning their way to the Amateurliga Berlin (II) in 1961, which became a third tier circuit in 1963 when German football was reorganized with the introduction of the Bundesliga (I) and Regionalliga (II). Through the 1960s and on through to the end of the 1970s SV remained part of the Amateurliga where they consistently earned lower table finishes. Their best result came as a second-place finish in 1976.

The club last played in the tier six Berlin-Liga after a second straight promotion from the Landesliga in 2017. On 11 December of that year Hellas-Nordwest merged with Berlin Türkspor 1965, which played in the tier-eleven Kreisliga C, and continued to play in the Berlin-Liga under the latter club's name, thus upgrading Türkspor to the city's highest league.
