= FC Ensdorf =

German football club

- Full name: Fußballclub Ensdorf e.V. 1912
- Founded: 1912
- Ground: Glück-Auf-Stadion
- Capacity: 12,000
- Chairman: Markus Gabriel
- Head Coach: Vedran Ivancovic
- League: Bezirksliga Saarlouis (IX)
- 2015–16: 3rd
- Website: https://www.fc-ensdorf.de
Home colours	Away colours

FC Ensdorf is a German association football club from the village of Ensdorf, Saarland. The club's greatest success has been promotion to the two Regionalliga Südwest where it played for a season in 1973–74.

The club has also made two appearances in the DFB-Pokal, the German Cup, in 1976–77 and 1982–83.

== History ==
Formed in 1912 FC Ensdorf spent the first three decades in local amateur football.

In post-Second World War football FC Ensdorf became a member of the tier two Ehrenliga Saarland which later became the Amateurliga Saarland. It played at this level from 1948 to 1951 and, from 1952 to 1954. The club made a return to the league after the introduction of the Bundesliga in 1963, now with the Amateurliga having dropped to third tier. It struggled against relegation for the first seasons after returning but improved from 1969 onwards, culminating in a league championship and promotion in 1973.

Ensdorf entered the tier two Regionalliga Südwest where it played for a season in 1973–74 before the league was disbanded in favour of the new 2. Bundesliga. The club came last in the league and was never in contention to qualify for the new 2. Bundesliga.

FC Ensdorf made two appearances in the DFB-Pokal, the German Cup, courtesy to reaching the final of the Saarland Cup, in 1976–77 and 1982–83, going out in the first round on each occasion after losing to Victoria Hamburg and Union Solingen. Back in the Amateurliga from 1974 onwards FC Ensdorf finished third in its first two seasons back but then declined and, finishing 14th in 1977–78, missed out on qualifying for the new Oberliga Südwest, which would have required finishing in the top seven.

Ensdorf became part of the new tier four Verbandsliga Saarland and won the league in its inaugural season in 1978–79, thereby earning promotion to the Oberliga. In the next four season the club played as a lower table side in the league, with an eleventh place in 1981 as its best result. A 19th-place finish in 1982–83 however meant relegation. The club bounced back immediately, winning the Verbandsliga and earning promotion but suffering another relegation straight away. Ensdorf played in the Verbandsliga for another nine season before it was relegated from this level as well after coming last in the league in 1993–94. The club was relegated from the Landesliga as well the following season and dropped out of higher league football in Saarland altogether.

By 2000 the club was relegated from the Bezirksliga as well. After dropping to the tier ten Kreisliga A Saar FC Ensdorf the club won the league in 2015 and moved up to the Bezirksliga again.

== Honours ==
The club's honours:

- Amateurliga Saarland
  - Champions: 1972–73
- Verbandsliga Saarland
  - Champions: 1978–79, 1983–84
- Saarland Cup
  - Winners: 1981–82
  - Runners-up: 1975–76

== Recent seasons ==
The recent season-by-season performance of the club:

Season	Division	Tier	Position
2003–04	Kreisliga A Saar	VIII	13th
2004–05	Kreisliga A Saar	VIII	11th
2005–06	Kreisliga A Saar	VIII	9th
2006–07	Kreisliga A Saar	VIII	14th
2007–08	Kreisliga A Saar	VIII	11th
2008–09	Kreisliga A Saar	IX	3rd ↑
2009–10	Bezirksliga Saarlouis	IX	11th
2010–11	Bezirksliga Saarlouis	IX	13th
2011–12	Bezirksliga Saarlouis	IX	18th ↓
2012–13	Kreisliga A Saar	X	4th
2013–14	Kreisliga A Saar	X	3rd
2014–15	Kreisliga A Saar	X	1st ↑
2015–16	Bezirksliga Saarlouis	IX	3rd
2016–17	Bezirksliga Saarlouis	IX	

- With the introduction of the Regionalligas in 1994 and the 3. Liga in 2008 as the new third tier, below the 2. Bundesliga, all leagues below dropped one tier.

↑ Promoted	↓ Relegated
