= Felix Linnemann =

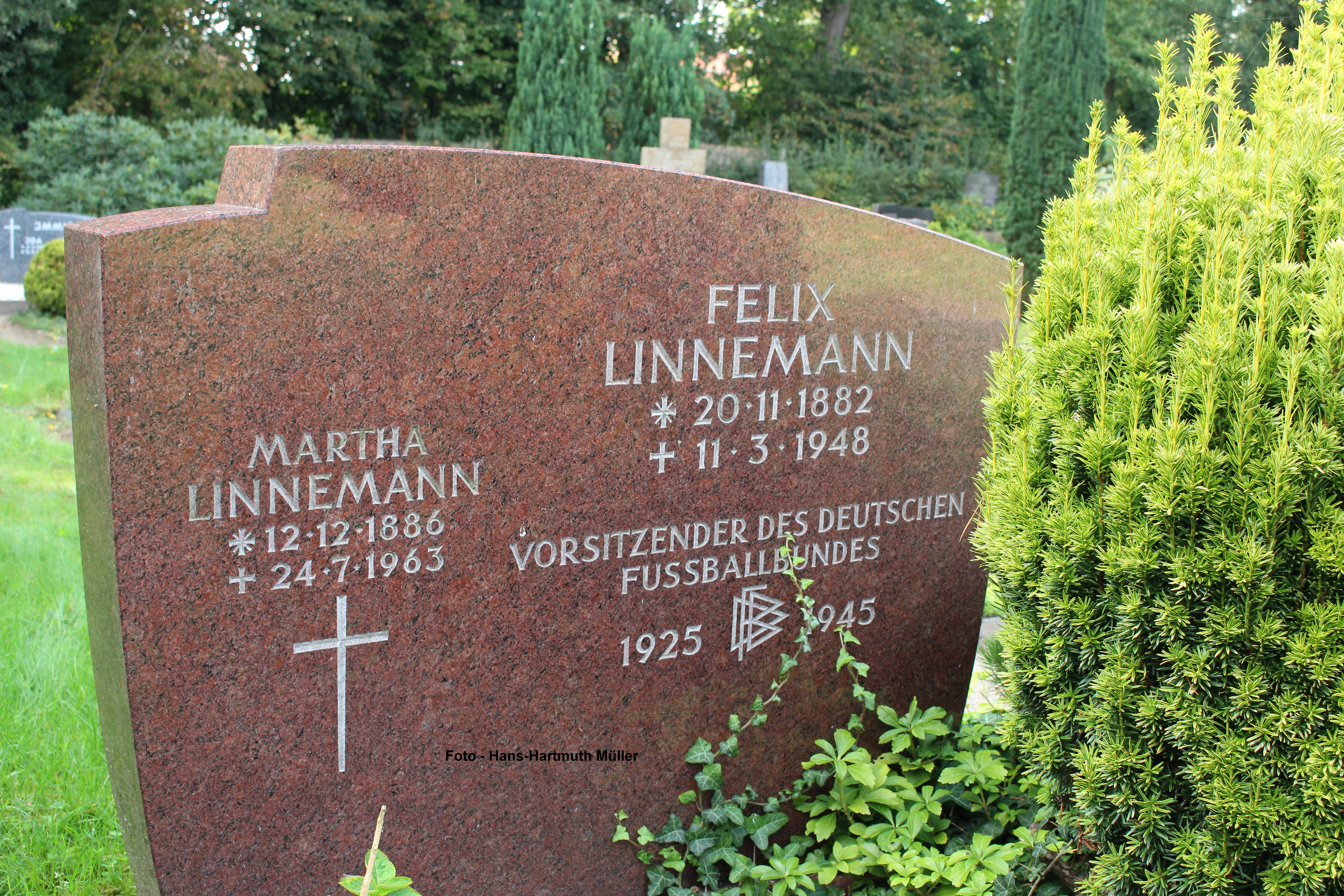
- Headstone of Linnemann

Head of the Reich Department of Football
- In office August 1934 – May 1945

4th President of the DFB
- In office 1925 – 1 July 1940
- Preceded by: Gottfried Hinze
- Succeeded by: Peco Bauwens

Personal details
- Born: 20 October 1882 Steinhorst, German Empire
- Died: 21 March 1948 (aged 65) Steinhorst, Allied-occupied Germany
- Education: University of Münster

Felix Linnemann (20 October 1882 – 21 March 1948) was the fourth president of the German Football Association, the Deutscher Fußball-Bund (DFB), serving from 1925 to 1945.

== Biography ==
Felix Linnemann was born and grew up at the edge of the Lüneburger Heide and went to the University of Münster, where he was a student of all four faculties. In 1919, Linnemann was appointed vice-president of the DFB.

The upper government and Kriminalrat exerted influence on the DFB, so that Linneman replaced Gottfried Hinze as DFB president in 1925. The move was considered as more penetration, and wanted a more honest, pragmatic, professional soccer in Germany. However, the political reversal made a line for it in 1933 by the calculation. The political sport leaders often wanted to present the football players at the ball in international matches as demonstration of national strength, making sport become an instrument of propaganda. Otto Nerz was discovered and appointed by Linnemann as the national team coach. After his resignation, the DFB president appointed Sepp Herberger, to become the new coach. The systematic training of Egidius Braunhe began to be used to train both players and coaches at this time. Both Linnemann and Herberger carried the idea of a Reichsliga, but the Second World War prevented the implementation of a football league in Germany. Linnemann had proposed the league to the regional football associations in 1932 but it had been vetoed.

Felix Linnemann announced the end of the DFB under the rule of Adolf Hitler. Already on 9 July 1933, he authorized the chairman Linnemann to make all personnel and material measures to the integration of the football haven in the program of the Sports office of the Reich (DRL) and the transformation of the DFB. The DFB was dissolved to be integrated into the recently created federation of the Nationalsozialistischer Reichsbund für Leibesübungen (NSRL).

DFB president Linnemann was active as a curator at the University of Leibesübungen in Berlin and as a member of the amateur commission of FIFA. Throughout 1937, Linnemann was transferred as a commander of the Kriminalpolizei from Berlin to Stettin, and was also attached to Hanover. In January 2020, the German Football Association announced that Linnemann "was directly involved in the registration of Sinti and Roma as the head of the Hannover Criminal Police control center" which led to the deportation of several hundred to Auschwitz concentration camp, where they died. After the end of the war, he spent six months in the internment camp with Englishmen in Lüneburger Heide; the Nazis had transferred the entire police with appropriate service ranks of the officials during the war to the SS. Linnemann died in 1948 in his home village Steinhorst near Hannover, where he is buried.

== See also ==
- Nationalsozialistischer Reichsbund für Leibesübungen
- Football section of the Reich Sports Office (Fachamt Fußball)
