= Amateurliga Saarland =

- Founded: 1951
- Folded: 1978 (27 seasons)
- Replaced by: Oberliga Südwest (III); Verbandsliga Saarland (IV)
- Country: Germany
- State: (Saar Protectorate) Saarland
- Level on pyramid: Level 3
- Promotion to: 2. Oberliga Südwest 1951–63; Regionalliga Südwest 1963–74; 2. Bundesliga Süd 1974–78
- Domestic cup: Saarland Pokal
- Last champions: Borussia Neunkirchen (1977–78)

The Amateurliga Saarland was the highest football league in the state of Saarland and the third tier of the German football league system from 1951, when the clubs from the Saar returned to Germany, until the formation of the Oberliga Südwest and the Verbandsliga Saarland below it in 1978.

== Overview ==
The Ehrenliga Saarland was formed in 1947 in the state of Saarland. The league was originally a feeder league to the Oberliga Südwest. Due to the special situation of Saarland, its clubs left the German football league system from 1948 to 1951 with the 1. FC Saarbrücken playing a year in the French second division. Three seasons in this period were played under independent Saarland Football Association control. From its return in 1951, now under the name of Amateurliga Saarland, until the establishment of the Oberliga Südwest in 1978, it was the third tier of the football league system.

The league was established in 1947 with ten teams, the winner gaining promotion to the Oberliga Südwest. The founder members were:

- FC Homburg
- Sportfreunde Burbach
- FC Ensdorf
- SC Brebach
- Preußen Merchweiler
- FV Püttlingen
- SV Ludweiler
- ASC Dudweiler
- SV Bliekastel
- Hellas Marpingen
- Viktoria Hühnerfeld

With the return to the German league system in 1951, two teams from the Amateurliga were admitted to the Oberliga Südwest, the 1. FC Saarbrücken and Borussia Neunkirchen.

The year after, three clubs were admitted to the new 2. Oberliga Südwest, the Viktoria Hühnerfeld, SC Altenkessel und Sportfreunde Saarbrücken.

The winner of the Amateurliga Saarland was not automatically promoted to its superior league but rather had to take part in a promotion play-off. The champion would have to compete with the winners of the Amateurliga Südwest and Rheinland.

With the introduction of the Bundesliga in 1963 the Amateurliga was placed below the new Regionalliga Südwest but still retained its third-tier status. It continued to do so after the introduction of the 2. Bundesliga Süd in 1974.

== Disbanding of the Amateurliga Saarland ==
In 1978, the Oberliga Südwest was formed to allow direct promotion to the 2. Bundesliga Süd for the amateur champion of the area. The last league winner, Borussia Neunkirchen, was promoted to the 2. Bundesliga. The teams placed two to seven gained entry to the Oberliga while the other twelve teams were put into the new Verbandsliga Saarland, now the fourth tier of the football league system.

Admitted to the new Oberliga:

- SV Röchling Völklingen
- SV St. Wendel
- VfB Dillingen
- ASC Dudweiler
- SV Auersmacher
- FSV Saarwellingen

Relegated to the new Verbandsliga:

- SC Friedrichsthal
- SSV Überherrn
- SV Bliesen
- FV Eppelborn
- SV Hasborn
- VfB Theley
- FC Ensdorf
- Saar 05 Saarbrücken
- SV Oberthal
- SV Weiskirchen
- SV Fraulautern
- SV St. Ingbert

== Winners of the Amateurliga Saarland ==
| Season | Club |
|---|---|
| 1947–48 | **FC Homburg** |
| 1948–49 | Borussia Neunkirchen |
| 1949–50 | Sportfreunde Saarbrücken |
| 1950–51 | 1. FC Saarbrücken II |
| 1951–52 | **Sportfreunde Saarbrücken** |
| 1952–53 | VfB Dillingen |
| 1953–54 | **SV Ludweiler** |
| 1954–55 | **SV St. Ingbert** |
| 1955–56 | **Viktoria Hühnerfeld** |
| 1956–57 | **FC Homburg** |
| 1957–58 | **VfB Theley** |
| 1958–59 | **SC Friedrichsthal** |
| 1959–60 | SV Röchling Völklingen |
| 1960–61 | **SV Röchling Völklingen** |
| 1961–62 | SV Fraulautern |
| 1962–63 | Viktoria Sulzbach |

| Season | Club |
|---|---|
| 1963–64 | Viktoria Sulzbach |
| 1964–65 | SV Ludweiler |
| 1965–66 | **FC Homburg** |
| 1966–67 | **SC Friedrichsthal** |
| 1967–68 | **SV Landsweiler–Reden** |
| 1968–69 | **SC Friedrichsthal** |
| 1969–70 | **VfB Theley** |
| 1970–71 | SV Fraulautern |
| 1971–72 | **VfB Theley** |
| 1972–73 | **FC Ensdorf** |
| 1973–74 | SV St.Ingbert |
| 1974–75 | ASC Dudweiler |
| 1975–76 | Borussia Neunkirchen |
| 1976–77 | Borussia Neunkirchen |
| 1977–78 | **Borussia Neunkirchen** |

Source:"Verbandsliga saarland". Das deutsche Fussball-Archiv. Archived from the original on 7 March 2008.

- **Bold** denotes team gained promotion.
- In 1951 the Borussia Neunkirchen was also promoted despite only finishing ninth in the league.
- In 1952 the league winner was promoted for a last time to the Oberliga Südwest and the teams placed second to fourth went to the new 2. Oberliga Südwest.
- In 1953 promotion went to the fourth placed ASC Dudweiler.
