= Hermann Neuberger =

German football official (1919–1992)

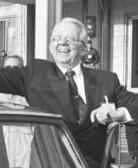
- Neuberger in 1990

7th President of the DFB
- In office 25 October 1975 – 27 September 1992
- Preceded by: Hermann Gösmann
- Succeeded by: Egidius Braun

Personal details
- Born: 12 December 1919 Völklingen-Fenne, Rhine Province, Weimar Republic
- Died: 27 September 1992 (aged 72) Homburg, Saarland, Germany

Hermann Neuberger (12 December 1919 – 27 September 1992) was the seventh president of the German Football Association (Deutscher Fußball-Bund, DFB) from 1975 until his death in office in 1992.

== Career ==
Neuberger, son of two teachers, grew up in the Saarbrücken Malstatt workers district and attended the Sasbach boarding school until graduating with Abitur in 1938. He was then drafted to the Wehrmacht and was operational in Africa and Italy during the Second World War, where he was later Captain for the Generals in Rome. After returning from British captivity in November 1945, he worked from 1946 as an editor at the Saarbrücken Sport-echo and from 1951 onwards in the advertising department of the Karlsberg brewery in Homburg. In 1955 he took over the management of Saarland-Sporttoto GmbH, where he was director from 1961 to 1984. From 1976 to 1984 he also managed its subsidiary, Saarland Spielbank GmbH.

He was elected President of the DFB at the DFB Bundestag on 25 October 1975 in Hamburg. Before his election to the DFB, Neuberger was already active as a sports functionary. During the time of independent Saarland, he was president of the Saarland Football Association. Later he played a role in the founding of the Bundesliga. He was the chief organizer of the 1974 FIFA World Cup in the Federal Republic of Germany. In 1974, he was elected vice president of the FIFA World Cup, and later became the organizer of the World Championships from 1978 to 1990. He held the position of FIFA vice-president and the DFB president until his death.

During his term of office, championships won include the European Championship in 1980, the world championships in 1982 and 1986, and the World Championship title 1990 in Italy. The national team managers during his term were Helmut Schön (1964-1978), Jupp Derwall (1978-1984), Franz Beckenbauer (1984-1990) and Berti Vogts (1990-1998).

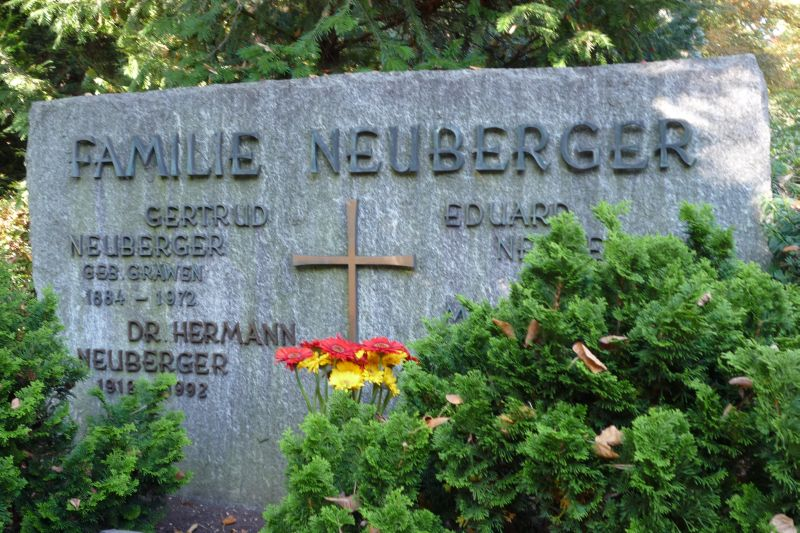
His grave at the Burbacher Waldfriedhof

Hermann Neuberger died on 27 September 1992, at the University Hospital in Homburg, following a battle with cancer. The headquarters of the DFB in Frankfurt - the Hermann-Neuberger-Haus - as well as the Hermann-Neuberger-Sportschule in Saarbrücken are named after him today. His birthplace, Völklingen, has named a sports hall, a stadium and a high school after him and placed a monument in his honor.

== Hermann-Neuberger Award ==
Since 2005, the Landessportverband for the Saarland has been awarding the Hermann-Neuberger-Award to clubs that have made a special contribution to the search and development of new talent, and the development of high performance sports in Saarland:

- 2012 - SV 64 Zweibrücken (handball)
- 2011 - Saarländischer Turnerbund (STB)
- 2009 - Saarland Triathlon Union
