= VfB Theley =

German football club

- Full name: Verein für Bewegungsspiele Theley
- Founded: 7 December 1919
- Ground: Schaumbergstadion
- Capacity: 9,000
- Chairman: Erich Müller
- Head Coach: Nicola Latta
- League: Verbandsliga Saarland (VII)
- 2015–16: Landesliga Nord (VIII), 2nd (promoted)
- Website: www.vfb-theley.com
Home colours	Away colours

VfB Theley is a German association football club from the Theley suburb of the town of Tholey, Saarland. The club's greatest success has been promotion to the second tier 2. Oberliga Südwest in 1958 where it played for five seasons. After the introduction of the Bundesliga in 1963 Theley spent another three seasons at the second tier, now the Regionalliga Südwest before dropping out of higher-level football altogether in 1974.

Theley also made two appearances in the DFB-Pokal, in 1974–75 and 1976–77, but was knocked out in the second round at each occasion.

== History ==
Football was established in Theley after the First World War when British soldiers were stationed in the village for a number of weeks to demarcate the boundary between Germany and the soon to be League of Nations-administrated Saarland and were spotted playing the game by local youth. The club played as a local amateur side for the first couple of decades of its existence.

VfB Theley won promotion to the tier three Amateurliga Saarland in 1955 and spent the first two seasons as a lower table side before winning the league in 1957–58. Promoted, Theley played in the 2. Oberliga Südwest the next five season from 1958 to 1963, playing as a lower table side with two eleventh-place finishes as its best result.

Back in the Amateurliga Theley won the league in 1970 and 1972, earning promotion to the tier two Regionalliga on each occasion. The club spent three seasons in the Regionalliga Südwest, in 1970–71 and from 1972 to 1974 with a tenth place in 1973 as its best result. At the end of the 1973–74 season the Regionalliga was disbanded in favour of the new 2. Bundesliga and the club dropped out of higher league football altogether.

In the period that followed Theley made two appearances in the first round of the DFB-Pokal, in 1974–75 and 1976–77. In Both instances the club advanced to the second round where it was knocked out by Altonaer FC 93 and MSV Duisburg. In its first two Amateurliga seasons Theley finished runners-up in the league and fourth in 1977 but, in 1977–78, when a top-seven finish was required to qualify for the new Oberliga the club came only thirteenth. Because of this it dropped to the new tier four Verbandsliga Saarland, but was relegated from this level the following season as well.

Theley returned to the Verbandsliga in 1981 but was relegated in 1984. It returned for a second time in 1988, generally achieving better results that culminated in a league championship in 1998–99. Promoted, the club played for a single season in the Oberliga Südwest in 1999–2000 but finished eighteenth and was relegated again. Back in the Verbandsliga Theley played as a lower table side until 2007 when it was relegated to the Landesliga. When the Saarlandliga was introduced as the new highest league in the state, as the sixth tier of the league system, the club moved back up to the expanded Verbandsliga. From there it won promotion to the Saarlandliga where it spent the 2010–11 season. Relegated back to the Verbandsliga Theley experienced another drop in 2015, now to the Landesliga. A runners-up finish in the Landesliga in 2015–16 took the club back up to the Verbandsliga.

== Honours ==
The club's honours:

- Amateurliga Saarland
  - Champions: 1957–58, 1969–70, 1971–72
- Verbandsliga Saarland
  - Champions: 1998–99, 2009–10
- Saarland Cup
  - Winners: 1975–76

== Recent seasons ==
The recent season-by-season performance of the club:

Season	Division	Tier	Position
2003–04	Verbandsliga Saarland	V	7th
2004–05	Verbandsliga Saarland	V	16th
2005–06	Verbandsliga Saarland	V	16th
2006–07	Verbandsliga Saarland	V	17th↓
2007–08	Landesliga Nordost	VI	3rd
2008–09	Landesliga Nordost	VII	3rd↑
2009–10	Verbandsliga Saarland	VII	1st↑
2010–11	Saarlandliga	VI	16th↓
2011–12	Verbandsliga Saarland	VII	15th
2012–13	Verbandsliga Saarland	VII	13th
2013–14	Verbandsliga Saarland	VII	11th
2014–15	Verbandsliga Saarland	VII	13th↓
2015–16	Landesliga Nord	VIII	2nd↑
2016–17	Verbandsliga Saarland	VII	

- With the introduction of the Regionalligas in 1994 and the 3. Liga in 2008 as the new third tier, below the 2. Bundesliga, all leagues below dropped one tier.

↑ Promoted	↓ Relegated
