= List of clubs in the Verbandsliga Württemberg =

This is a List of clubs in the Verbandsliga Württemberg, including all clubs and their final placings from the inaugural 1978–79 season to the current one. The league is the highest football league in the Württemberg region of Baden-Württemberg. It is one of 35 leagues at the sixth tier of the German football league system. Until the introduction of the 3. Liga in 2008 it was the fifth tier of the league system, until the introduction of the Regionalliga in 1994 the fourth tier.

== Overview ==
The league was formed in 1978 to replace the two regional amateur leagues that existed in its place until then, the Amateurliga Nordwürttemberg and the Amateurliga Schwarzwald-Bodensee, as the third tier in Baden-Württemberg. At the same time, the Amateur-Oberliga Baden-Württemberg was formed above it.

=== League timeline ===
The league went through the following timeline of name changes, format and position in the league system:

Years	Name	Tier	Promotion to
1978–94	Verbandsliga Württemberg	IV	Amateur-Oberliga Baden-Württemberg
1994–2008	Verbandsliga Württemberg	V	Oberliga Baden-Württemberg
2008–	Verbandsliga Württemberg	VI	Oberliga Baden-Württemberg

== League placings ==
The complete list of clubs in the league and their league placings.

=== 1978–1994 ===
The complete list of clubs and placings in the league while operating as a tier four league from 1978 to 1994:

Club	S	79	80	81	82	83	84	85	86	87	88	89	90	91	92	93	94
SSV Reutlingen	3	O	2	O	O	O	7	1	O	O	O	O	O	O	O	O	O
SpVgg Ludwigsburg	7	O	O	O	O	O	O	O	O	O	O	1	O	O	O	O	O
VfB Stuttgart II	3	2	O	O	O	O	O	O	O	O	O	2	1	O	O	O	O
TSF Ditzingen	8													1	O	O	O
VfL Kirchheim/Teck	10							7	2	O	O	O	O	O	1	O	O
SC Geislingen	7			10	15		2	O	O	1	O	O	O	O	2	O	O
GSV Maichingen	4			15										5	11	1	O
VfR Aalen	7		1	O	6	1	O	O	O	O	2	O	O	7	8	2	O
FV Biberach	9	O	O	O	O	O	O	O	O	5	7	17			17		1
TSV Wäldenbronn	4															11	2
FV Ravensburg	21	O	O	O	O	O	20						9	8	10	5	3
VfR Heilbronn	15	1	O	O	O	O	O	8	1	O	4	10	4	6	3	14	4
FC Marbach	7				10	12	1	O	O	O	O	O	O	O	O	10	5
SV Berlichingen	4															13	6
SpVgg Renningen	17	10	7	9	3	3	16				5	11	3	4	5	12	7
TSV Eltingen	9											9	5	14	12	4	8
SpVgg Böblingen	22							5	12	10	6	16			13	6	9
FC Wangen 05	37	12	19		13	4	8	2	10	11	13	12	12	3	9	7	10
FV Zuffenhausen	22	4	11	4	7	7	6	16		4	8	4	11	11	14	9	11
VfL Herrenberg	8		18									14	8	10	4	3	12
TSV Ofterdingen	19	5	6	5	1	O	4	14	16			10	13	6	8	13	13
VfL Sindelfingen	23					15			7	3	3	3	2	O	O	O	14
SpVgg Au/Iller	16	8	9	2	12	16							16				15
TV Darmsheim	1																16
FC Tailfingen	7	O	O	O	O	17		14	13	2	1	O	18			15	
Stuttgarter Kickers II	15	6	13	7	2	2	3	6	9	15				2	O	16	
SGV Freiberg	10														7	17	
TSV Plietzhausen	7						15	11	4	17						18	
TSG Backnang	17						14	9	8	13	14	6	6	9	15		
SB Heidenheim ^{3}	11	O	8	8	14	18									16		
FV Ebingen	11	15	14	13	9	5	13	15		18		15		12	18		
Viktoria Backnang	3								18				7	15			
1. Göppinger SV	13	O	O	O	O	O	O	O	3	6	12	5	13	16			
SV Stuttgart-Rot	10				8	10	12	12	5	14	10	7	15	17			
SV Oberzell	6										9	13	14	18			
SV Bonlanden	10											8	17				
Sportfreunde Schwäbisch Hall	17	14	12	1	O	11	9	3	11	9	11	18					
TSG Giengen	10	9	10	3	4	8	5	13	6	8	15						
Germania Bietigheim	4		17					17		12	16						
VfL Nagold	8									7	17						
TSB Schwäbisch Gmünd	5					6	10	10	17		18						
VfL Pfullingen	6	17			16						19						
TV Wiblingen	1								15								
FV Saulgau	3			18			17		16								
VfB Friedrichshafen	14	O	3	6	11	9	11	18									
BSV Schwenningen	6	13	14	11	5	13	18										
VfL Schorndorf	5	11	16	17		14	19										
SV Mochenwangen	5					19											
FC Eislingen	2	O	O	O	18												
Union Böckingen	4	7	4	14	19												
SV Leingarten	1			16													
FV Bad Waldsee	1		20														
TSG Tübingen	5	16															
SpVgg Lindau	1	18															
SV Baustetten	3	19															
FC Tuttlingen	1	20															

=== 1994–present ===
The complete list of clubs and placings in the league while operating as the tier five (1994–2008) and six (2008–present) league:

Club	S	95	96	97	98	99	00	01	02	03	04	05	06	07	08	09	10	11	12	13	14	15	16	17	18	19	20	21	22	23
1. FC Heidenheim ^{3}	11					3	5	10	8	2	2	O	O	O	O	R	3L	3L	3L	3L	3L	2B	2B	2B	2B	2B	2B	2B	2B	2B
SG Sonnenhof Großaspach	3									8	8	1	O	O	O	O	R	R	R	R	R	3L	3L	3L	3L	3L	3L	R	R	O
FV Illertissen	5										11	6	7	9	3	O	O	O	O	R	R	R	R	R	R	R	R	R	R	R
SSV Ulm 1846 ^{2}	1	R	R	R	R	2B	B	2B	2	O	O	O	O	O	O	R	R	R	O	R	R	O	O	R	R	R	R	R	R	R
Stuttgarter Kickers II ^{9}	15			13	11	12	2	O	O	O	O	O	O	O	O	O	O	O	O	O	O	O	O	O						
TSG Balingen	13		10	11	8	10	7	3	7	12	7	2	2	5	1	O	O	O	O	O	O	O	O	O	O	R	R	R	R	R
FV Ravensburg	21	12	11	2	1	O	O	6	12	15			8	3	15	8	4	2	5	2	O	O	O	O	O	O	O	O	O	O
FSV 08 Bissingen	8													11	11	2	6	3	2	O	3	1	O	O	O	O	O	O	O	O
Neckarsulmer SU	3																				4	6	1	O	O	O	O	O	O	O
1. Göppinger SV	13																8	4	3	3	2	2	2	O	O	O	O	O	O	O
SGV Freiberg	10	11	6	9	14		9	1	O	O	O	O	O	O	O	O	O	O	1	O	O	O	O	1	O	O	O	O	O	O
TSV Ilshofen	3																						6	3	2	O	O	O	O	x
Sportfreunde Dorfmerkingen	8				2	O	1	O	O	O	6	11	12	16											3	1	O	O	O	x
TSG Backnang 1919	17		9	6	15						14											7	5	2	O	O	1	O	O	O
FSV Hollenbach	8														5	3	1	O	O	O	O	O	O	O	4	2	2	2	1	O
FC Holzhausen	2																											9	2	O
SSV Ehingen-Süd	5																								8	5	4	7	3	x
1. FC Normannia Gmünd	11									5	1	O	O	O	O	O	O	O	O	8	10	4	7	9	1	O	3	6	4	x
TSV Essingen	9																		14			5	3	6	9	4	8	1	5	x
TSV Berg	7																				8	8	9	14			10	4	6	x
TSG Hofherrnweiler-Unterromb.	3																										13	19	7	x
TSG Tübingen	6																								6	8	7	12	8	x
SV Fellbach	11				6	4	4	9	16				11	10	16												16	11	9	x
VfL Pfullingen	8																							4	14		12	15	10	x
VfL Sindelfingen	23	9	8	12	5	5	13								7	12					15		10	8	11	7	9	13	11	x
Calcio Leinfelden-Echterdingen	6																							7	10	9	5	10	12	x
SKV Rutesheim	8															10	12	14							13	3	6	16	13	x
FC Wangen 05	37	2	O	3	12	11	6	4	14			7	16		14	14		8	8	9	7	16		11	5	10	17	8	14	x
TSV Crailsheim ^{6}	4								4	1	O	O	O	O	O	O	O											3	15	
Türk Spor Neu-Ulm	2																											14	16	
1. FC Heiningen	5																						13			6	11	5	17	
TSV Heimerdingen	3																										14	20	18	
VfB Friedrichshafen	14	7	15							13						11	13		15									17	19	
VfB Neckarrems	12																2	O	10	10	6	11	4	5	12	11	15	18	20	
VfL Nagold	9															4	10	15			12	10	15			12				x
SV Breuningsweiler	1																									13				
FV Olympia Laupheim	13										4	3	4	7	10	7	11	6	13			13	12	16		14				
FV Löchgau	2																							13		15				
FC Albstadt	11					6	10	15											9	12	9	9	11	10	7	16				
TSG Öhringen	1																								15					
Sportfreunde Schwäbisch Hall	17																		7	4	5	3	8	12	16					x
SV Zimmern	1																							15						
SpVgg Böblingen	22	4	1	O	O	O	3	2	5	7	3	10	13						6	7	11	12	14							
TSG Balingen II	1																						16							
VfR Aalen II	6														8	9	5	10	11		1	O								
Rot-Weiß Weiler	2						14															14								
FC Gärtringen	3													13			14					15								
1. FC Heidenheim II ^{8}	3																	7	4	1	O									
1. FC Frickenhausen	7											15			9	5	9	13		11	13									
SG Sonnenhof Großaspach II	2																			5	14									
SV Bonlanden	10	1	O	O	O	O	O	O	1	O	O	O	1	O	6	1	O	1	O	6	16									
VfB Bösingen	1																			13										
VfL Kirchheim/Teck ^{4}	10	O	O	O	R	O	O	O	3	3	12	10	9	1	O	O	O	O		14										
TSG Ehingen	1																			15										
SV Hellas 94 Bietigheim	1																			16										
Tura Untermünkheim	2																	5	12											
SV Nehren	2																	9	16											
TSV Münchingen	2																	11	17											
TV Echterdingen	2																7	12												
SpVgg Ludwigsburg	7	R	R	R	O	O	O	O	O	O	O	O	6	8	4	6	3	16												
SV Oberzell	6								15								15													
SpVgg Au/Iller	16		2	4	3	1	O	O	O	O	O	8	10	4	2	O	16													
FV Biberach	9	O	O	O	O	O	O	12	10	16						13														x
1. FC Donzdorf	2													15		15														
TSF Ditzingen	8	R	R	R	R	R	R	O	O	4	12	9	5	6	12	16														
TSV Schwieberdingen ^{7}	3											4	3	2	O															
SV Baustetten	3													12	13															
TSV Hildrizhausen	1													14																
TuS Metzingen	5				16					10	5	5	14																	
TB Kirchentellinsfurt	1												15																	
FC Eislingen	2												17																	
FV Rottweil	4							5	6	14		13																		
SG Schorndorf	1											14																		
TSV Schönaich	7					8	12	11	11	9	9	16																		
FC Heilbronn ^{5}	1																													
SSV Reutlingen II	5						8	8	9	6	16																			
VfR Heilbronn ^{5}	15	10	4	1	O	2	O	O	O	11																				
TSV Ofterdingen	19	13	7	7	15			13		15																				
FV Zuffenhausen	22	6	3	5	4	13		7	17																					
Viktoria Schwäbisch Gmünd	2						11	13																						
SpVgg Renningen	17	8	14			14		14																						
TSV Allmendingen	1							16																						
SV Mochenwangen	5			10	9	9	15																							
TSV Wäldenbronn	4	O	O	O	O	7	16																							
FC Isny	2				10	16																								
SC Geislingen	7	O	O	8	13																									x
TuS Ergenzingen	1			14																										
SC Korb	1			15																										
TSV Plietzhausen	7		12	16																										
TSV Eltingen	9	5	7	17																										
SV Berlichingen	4	3	5																											
FC Marbach	7	14	16																											
GSV Maichingen ^{1}	4	O																												
VfL Herrenberg	8	15																												
SV Tübingen	1	16																												

=== Key ===
Symbol	Key
B	Bundesliga
2B	2. Bundesliga
3L	3. Liga
R	Regionalliga Süd (1994–2012) Regionalliga Südwest (2012–present)
O	Oberliga Baden-Württemberg
1	League champions
Place	League
Blank	Played at a league level below this league

- S = No of seasons in league (as of 2022–23)

=== Notes ===
- ^{1} In 1995 GSV Maichingen withdrew their team from the Oberliga.
- ^{2} In 2001 SSV Ulm 1846 withdrew from the 2nd Bundesliga to the Verbandsliga for financial reasons.
- ^{3} In 2007 the football department of SB Heidenheim left the club to form 1. FC Heidenheim 1846.
- ^{4} In 2011 VfL Kirchheim/Teck voluntarily withdrew from the league.
- ^{5} In 2003 VfR Heilbronn merged with SpVgg Heilbronn to form FC Heilbronn.
- ^{6} In 2010 TSV Crailsheim withdrew their team from the Oberliga.
- ^{7} In 2008 TSV Schwieberdingen withdrew their team from the Oberliga.
- ^{8} In 2014 1. FC Heidenheim II withdrew their team from the Oberliga.
- ^{9} In 2017 Stuttgarter Kickers withdrew their reserve team from the Oberliga.
