= Vincent Sadler =

German footballer

Personal information
- Date of birth: 6 July 2001 (age 25)
- Height: 1.84 m (6 ft 0 in)
- Position: Defender

Team information
- Current team: TSG Backnang 1919
- Number: 7

Youth career
- 2017–2020: Sonnenhof Großaspach

Senior career*
Years	Team	Apps	(Gls)
2020–2022	Sonnenhof Großaspach	41	(0)
2022–	TSG Backnang 1919	15	(1)
- * Club domestic league appearances and goals as of 19 November 2022

Vincent Sadler (born 6 July 2001) is a German footballer who plays as a defender for TSG Backnang 1919.

== Career ==
A prospect from the SG Sonnenhof Großaspach youth system, Sadler stood out as a goalscoring defender. In 2019, he was one of four young athletes to receive the "Porsche Turbo Award" in the category of "best academy performance", an award given to the best performances from Porsche affiliated clubs, of whom Sonnenhof Großaspach is one. Sadler made his first appearance for the senior team in a friendly against second-tier club 1. FC Heidenheim in autumn 2019, and was part of the matchday squad in the 3. Liga for the first time in February 2020 against Hallescher FC. After the temporary suspension of the 2019–20 season due to the COVID-19 pandemic, Sadler made his competitive first-team debut in early July in the last home match of the season against 1860 Munich, though Großaspach had already been relegated at this point.

Already in late May 2020, his move ahead of the 2020–21 season to 1. FC Normannia Gmünd had become known, and he was brought there by head coach Zlatko Blaškić who had previously worked with him at Großaspach. After Großaspach suffered relegation to the Regionalliga Südwest, Sadler received an offer from the club to stay and ultimately decided to remain at Sonnenhof Großaspach to compete for a starting role at the club.
