= Artur Degraf =

German footballer (born 2006)

Personal information
- Date of birth: 22 July 2006 (age 20)
- Place of birth: Biberach an der Riß, Germany
- Height: 1.83 m (6 ft 0 in)
- Positions: Wide midfielder; winger; wing-back

Team information
- Current team: Bayern Munich II

Youth career
- 2011–2015: FV Biberach
- 2015–2016: SSV Biberach
- 2016–2021: FV Ravensburg
- 2021–2025: SSV Ulm

Senior career*
Years	Team	Apps	(Gls)
2024–2025	SSV Ulm	0	(0)
2025–	Bayern Munich II	34	(5)
- * Club domestic league appearances and goals as of 7 November 2026

Artur Degraf (born 22 July 2006) is a German professional footballer who plays as a wide midfielder, winger and wing-back for Regionalliga Bayern club Bayern Munich II.

== Club career ==
Born in Biberach an der Riß, Germany, Degraf is a youth product of his hometown clubs FV Biberach and SSV Biberach, later joining the youth academy of FV Ravensburg in 2016.

He moved to the youth academy of SSV Ulm in 2021, progressing through the youth ranks and breaking through the first team during the 2023–24 season. Degraf made his professional debut and his only official appearance with SSV Ulm during a 2–0 away loss Württembergpokal semi final match against SG Sonnenhof Großaspach, on 1 May 2024.

On 1 July 2025, he joined Bayern Munich, and was immediately assigned to the reserve team in the Regionalliga Bayern, ahead of the 2025–26 season. Degraf made his debut with Bayern Munich II during a 2–1 away win Regionalliga Bayern match against FC Augsburg II, on 25 July 2025. Some days later, he scored his first professional goals, scoring twice with Bayern Munich II during a 6–3 home win Regionalliga Bayern match against TSV Buchbach, on 1 August.

== Career statistics ==
=== Club ===
As of 7 November 2026

Appearances and goals by club, season and competition
Club	Season	League			DFB-Pokal		Other		Total	
Club	Season	Division	Apps	Goals	Apps	Goals	Apps	Goals	Apps	Goals
SSV Ulm	2021–22	3. Liga	0	0	—		1 (Note: Appearance in Württembergpokal)	0	1	0
SSV Ulm	2024–25	2. Bundesliga	0	0	0	0	—		0	0
SSV Ulm	Total		0	0	0	0	1	0	1	0
Bayern Munich II	2025–26	Regionalliga Bayern	22	3	—		0	0	22	3
Bayern Munich II	2026–27	Regionalliga Bayern	12	2	—		—		12	2
Bayern Munich II	Total		34	5	—		0	0	34	5
Career total			34	5	0	0	1	0	35	5

== Style of play ==
Degraf is a winger capable to play on both flanks, he played as a left winger and left midfielder during his time at SSV Ulm, after moving to Bayern Munich II he was deployed as a winger on both flanks and as a forward upfront during his first season, the next season Degraf dropped back with his positions to a more versatile role, deployed on both flanks as a wide midfielder, wing-back and full-back under the coaching of Dante.
