= Preto (footballer, born 1981) =

Brazilian footballer

Personal information
- Full name: João Luis Ferreira da Silva
- Date of birth: 12 June 1981 (age 45)
- Place of birth: Novo Hamburgo, Brazil
- Height: 1.70 m (5 ft 7 in)
- Position: Forward

Senior career*
Years	Team	Apps	(Gls)
1999	Vila Nova		
2000–2001	TSV Schwieberdingen	0	(0)
2001–2002	Stuttgarter Kickers	2	(0)
2001–2002	Stuttgarter Kickers II	7	(3)
2003	São José EC		
2003–2004	Zagłębie Lubin	4	(0)
2004–2005	EC Novo Hamburgo		
2006	→ AD São Caetano (loan)		
2006	→ Portuguesa de Desportos (loan)	12	(2)
2007–2009	Portuguesa de Desportos	62	(2)
2010	Guarani FC	18	(0)
2011	AC Goianiense	2	(0)
2011	EC Vitória	13	(0)
2012	EC Novo Hamburgo		
2012	Vila Nova	1	(0)
2012–2013	CA Bragantino	34	(0)
2014	EC Novo Hamburgo		
2014	Caxias	2	(0)
2014	Ypiranga	8	(0)
2016–2018	EC Novo Hamburgo	18	(1)
- * Club domestic league appearances and goals

João Luiz Ferreira da Silva (born 12 June 1981), known as Preto, is a Brazilian former professional footballer who played as a forward. He appeared in the Campeonato Brasileiro Série A for Portuguesa, Guarani and Goianiense.

== Career ==
Preto had worked with manager Vágner Benazzi at Portuguesa in 2009 before re-uniting with him at Bragantino in 2012.
