= Brigitte Butscher =

German footballer

Personal information
- Date of birth: 18 April 1957 (age 69)
- Position: Goalkeeper

Senior career*
Years	Team	Apps	(Gls)
- SG Aulendorf

International career
1986	Germany	1	(0)
- * Club domestic league appearances and goals

Brigitte Butscher (born 18 April 1957) is a German footballer who played for the Germany national team in 1986. On club level she played for SG Aulendorf.

== Career ==
Butscher was a goalkeeper from 1985 to 1987 for the women's soccer department of SG Aulendorf 1920, founded in 1971 and dissolved in 1987, in the Württemberg Football Association.

After being a long-time player for the Wuerttemberg Football Association select team, she played her only international match for the senior national team on July 27, 1986, against the national team of Iceland. She came on as a second-half substitute for Rosemarie Neuser in the 4–1 win in Kópavogur.

== Miscellaneous ==
In her free time, she plays tennis at the TC Ösch Weingarten (now SPG Berg/Blitzenreute/Ösch-Weingarten), which was founded in 1983 under the umbrella organization of the Württemberg Tennis Association.
