= VfL Kirchheim/Teck =

Association football club

- Full name: Verein für Leibesübungen Kirchheim/Teck e.V.
- Nickname(s): Die Zecken
- Founded: 6 July 1881
- Ground: Stadion an der Jesinger Allee
- Capacity: 10,000
- Chairman: Doris Imrich
- Manager: Vacant
- League: Bezirksliga Neckar/Fils (VIII)
- 2015–16: Kreisliga A Neckar/Fils (IX), 1st (promoted)
Home colours	Away colours

Verein für Leibesübungen Kirchheim/Teck e.V., commonly known as VfL Kirchheim/Teck, is a German association football club from the city of Kirchheim unter Teck, Baden-Württemberg. The football club is part of a larger sports club that has over 4,000 members in 18 departments that include Aikido, athletics, badminton, basketball, bowling, fencing, fistball, gymnastics, handball, Judo, Karate, swimming, table tennis, tennis, triathlon, and wrestling. The club also has sections for leisure sport, seniors, and rehabilitation.

== History ==
The origins of the club go back to the establishment on 6 July 1881 of the gymnastics club Turnverein 1861 Kirchheim. A football department was formed within the association and in 1911 became independent as VfB Kirchheim. On 20 May 1933 the team merged with TSV 1861 Kirchheim to create Turn- und Sportvereinigung Kirchheim which was itself made up of the original parent club TV and TB 1888 Kirchheim 1922. This union was short-lived and broke up on 26 February 1935, only to be re-made in 1945 as VfL Kirchheim.

In 1941 the footballers took part in qualification play for the Gauliga Württemberg, one of sixteen top flight divisions established in the 1933 reorganization of German football under the Third Reich, but failed to advance after finishing second in their playoff pool. Following World War II the team played in the Amateurliga Württemberg (II) from 1946 to 1952 before slipping to lower-level competition for several decades. Kirchheim returned to the Amateurliga (IV) level in 1984–85 and the following season were promoted to the Oberliga Baden-Württemberg (III) where they earned mixed results until relegated for a single season in 1991–92. On their return to the Oberliga they played as a lower table side, failing to qualify for the new third division Regionalliga Süd formed in 1994 through restructuring of the country's football competitions. However, VfL later won its way into tier III play on the strength of an Oberliga Baden-Württemberg (IV) title in 1997. The club's turn at the Regionalliga level was unsuccessful, and they struggled over the following seasons, leading to demotion to the Verbandsliga Württemberg (V) in 2001. The club again returned to the Oberliga Württemberg (IV) following a Verbandsliga championship in 2007, but withdrew from the league in 2011, opting not to field a first team in 2011–12 and to return to the Verbandsliga Württemberg in 2012.

The club finished on a relegation rank in 2012–13 and dropped to the tier seven Landesliga for the following season, followed by another relegation in 2014, now to the Bezirksliga. After dropping down to the tier nine Kreisliga A in 2015 the club recovered and won the league, earning promotion back to the Bezirksliga.

== Honours ==
The club's honours:

=== League ===
- Oberliga Baden-Württemberg (IV)
  - Champions: 1997
- Verbandsliga Württemberg (V)
  - Champions: 1986, 1992, 2007
- Landesliga Württemberg
  - Champions: 1984

=== Cup ===
- Württemberg Cup
  - Winners: 1961, 2003
  - Runners-up: 1988, 1997

== Stadium ==
The Sportgelände an der Jesinger Allee has five turf and one artificial turf football pitches. The spectator area at the main playing field can accommodate 10,000 (400 seats).

== Recent managers ==
Recent managers of the club:

Manager	Start	Finish
Michael Rentschler	1 July 2007	30 June 2008
Rolf Baumann	7 October 2008	19 April 2010
Thomas Stumpp Oliver Otto	20 April 2010	30 June 2010
Rainer Kraft	1 July 2010	30 June 2011
Vacant	1 July 2011	Present

== Recent seasons ==
The recent season-by-season performance of the club:

Season	Division	Tier	Position
1999–2000	Oberliga Baden-Württemberg	IV	8th
2000–01	Oberliga Baden-Württemberg	IV	17th ↓
2001–02	Verbandsliga Württemberg	V	3rd
2002–03	Verbandsliga Württemberg	V	3rd
2003–04	Verbandsliga Württemberg	V	12th
2004–05	Verbandsliga Württemberg	V	10th
2005–06	Verbandsliga Württemberg	V	9th
2006–07	Verbandsliga Württemberg	V	1st ↑
2007–08	Oberliga Baden-Württemberg	IV	14th
2008–09	Oberliga Baden-Württemberg	V	10th
2009–10	Oberliga Baden-Württemberg	V	6th
2010–11	Oberliga Baden-Württemberg	V	9th
2011–12	Inactive		
2012–13	Verbandsliga Württemberg	VI	14th ↓
2013–14	Landesliga Württemberg	VII	15th ↓
2014–15	Bezirksliga Neckar/Fils	VIII	13th ↓
2015–16	Kreisliga A Neckar/Fils	IX	1st ↑
2016–17	Bezirksliga Neckar/Fils	VIII	

- With the introduction of the Regionalligas in 1994 and the 3. Liga in 2008 as the new third tier, below the 2. Bundesliga, all leagues below dropped one tier.

↑ Promoted	↓ Relegated
