= Schwieberdingen =

German town

- Municipality
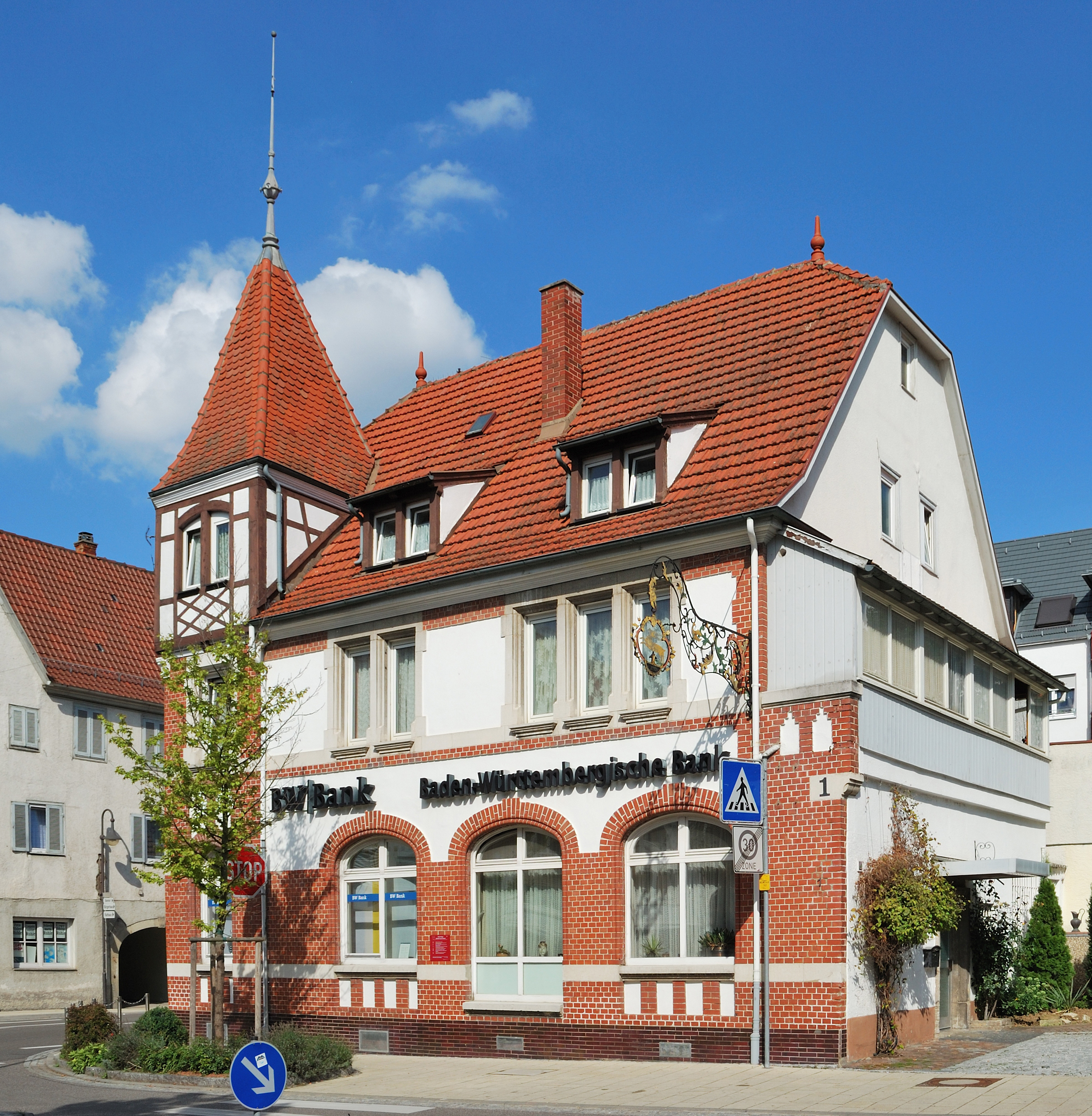
- Former Zum Hirsch guesthouse

- Coat of arms

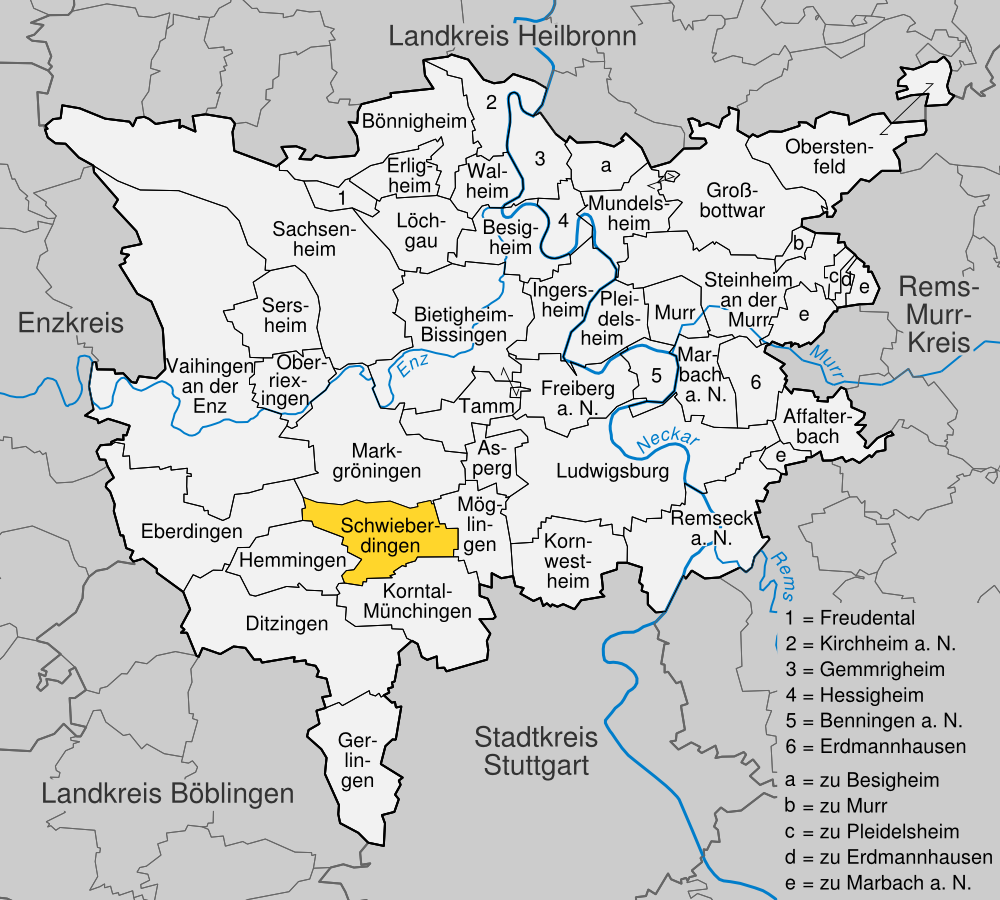
- Location in Ludwigsburg district
- Interactive map of Schwieberdingen
- Location within Germany Location within Baden-Württemberg
- Coordinates: 48°52′40″N 9°4′30″E
- Country: Germany
- State: Baden-Württemberg
- Admin. region: Stuttgart
- District: Ludwigsburg

Government
  - Mayor (2023–31): Stefan Benker

Area
  - Total: 14.87 km^{2} (5.74 sq mi)
- Elevation: 274 m (899 ft)

Population (2025-12-31)
  - Total: 11,258
  - Density: 757.1/km^{2} (1,961/sq mi)
- Time zone: UTC+01:00 (CET)
  - Summer (DST): UTC+02:00 (CEST)
- Postal codes: 71701
- Dialling codes: 07150
- Vehicle registration: LB
- Website: www.schwieberdingen.de

Schwieberdingen (German pronunciation: [ˈʃviːbɐˌdɪŋən]; Swabian: Schwiewerdenge) is a municipality of the Ludwigsburg district in Baden-Württemberg, Germany. The town itself is located about 10 kilometers (6.2 mi) from Stuttgart, the state capital, and 5 kilometers (3.1 mi) from Ludwigsburg, the district capital. Schwieberdingen belongs to the Stuttgart Region and Metropolitan Region. Schwieberdingen is twinned with the French township of Vaux-le-Pénil.

Schwieberdingen was possibly founded in the 3rd century, but was first mentioned in a 1304 document. The town is characterized by its location on the route from Flanders to the Black Sea, which today forms the Bundesstraße 10. After the Second World War, Schwieberdingen transitioned from an agricultural base to an industrial one.

The town's sports club is the TSV Schwieberdingen. Its largest division, the football club, plays in the Verbandsliga Württemberg.

== Geography ==
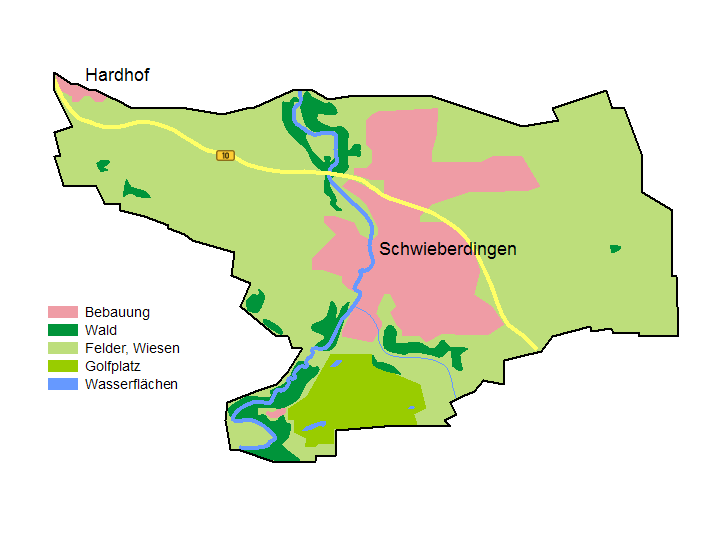
Map of Schwieberdingen municipality

Schwieberdingen is located in the southwest part of the Neckar basin, in the center of the German state of Baden-Württemberg.

The landscape around Schwieberdingen shows a great diversity of soil formations, visible in the suffixes -berg, -grund, and -tal within the municipality. The river Glems flows through Schwieberdingen.

The highest point above sea level in Schwieberdingen is the Katharinenlinde at 351 meters (1,152 ft) NN, and the lowest is the Gemarkungsgrenze at 238 meters (781 ft) NN.

=== Climate ===
Schwieberdingen is characterized by a mild climate caused by its location in the southwest region of the Neckar basin. It is shielded by the Black Forest to the west, the Swabian Alb to the south, the Swabian-Franconian Forest to the east, and the Stromberg-Heuchelberg Nature Park to the northwest. Belonging to the Upper Rhine Valley and the Stuttgart Metropolitan Region, Schwieberdingen is in one of the warmest areas of Germany. The warmest month is July, with a mean temperature of 18.8 °C (65.8 °F), while the coldest is January with an average temperature of 1.3 °C (34.3 °F). The average annual rainfall in Schwieberdingen is 679 millimeters (26.7 in), coming mostly between June and August as is normal in southern Germany. Low rainfall in the region has led to the necessity of external water supply, found in the Lake Constance Water Supply project from 1954 onward.

=== Area distribution ===
According to the State Statistical Officer of Baden-Württemberg, the municipality of Schwieberdingen comprises 1,487 hectares (3,670 acres) total, as of 2014. Agriculture takes up most of the municipality area at 61.3%, while the rest of the municipality is urban environment or woodland.

== History ==
The first traces of habitation in Schwieberdingen come from about 5000 BC, in the Neolithic period. The State Office for the Preservation of Monuments in Baden-Württemberg has discovered two Neolithic settlements in Schwieberdingen. The first belonged to what has been called the Schwieberdinger culture and is date to 4300 BC to 4200 BC and includes the skeleton of a woman dated to 4000 BC. The second settlement belonged to the Michelsberg culture and is about 700 to 800 years newer than the Schwieberdinger culture.

=== Roman and Migration periods ===
The Roman Empire conquered the modern-day municipal area and its Celtic inhabitants in 85 BC. The Romans then built a road through the area to a ford on the Glems. This road, at first just for the Roman military, would shape Schwieberdingen's destiny as one of the few connections between the Rhine and the Danube. Emperor Hadrian in particular made great use of the road. Roman farming estates were established in the area of present-day Schwieberdingen.

In the 3rd century AD, the Alemanni conquered the Imperial province of Germania Superior and possibly established the first settlement in the municipal area. The territory of Schwieberdingen, then called "Suidbert-ingen", was fully established by 500, when the Franks subdued the Alemanni. The border between Francia and the Alemanni became, with the Christianisation of the Germanic peoples, the border of the dioceses of Speyer and of Constance. The Schwieberdingen of this time period must have been a military settlement to protect the important river crossing on the Glems. Other Alemannic settlements existed in the area, most notably Vöhingen, which was established between 750 and 802 but abandoned in the 14th century.

=== Middle Ages ===
Schwieberdingen was mentioned for the first time as "Swiebertingen" in an urbarium from 1304, though the House of Nippenburg had property in the village from 1160. In 1321, the count governing Schwieberdingen sold the territory to Eberhard I, Count of Württemberg.

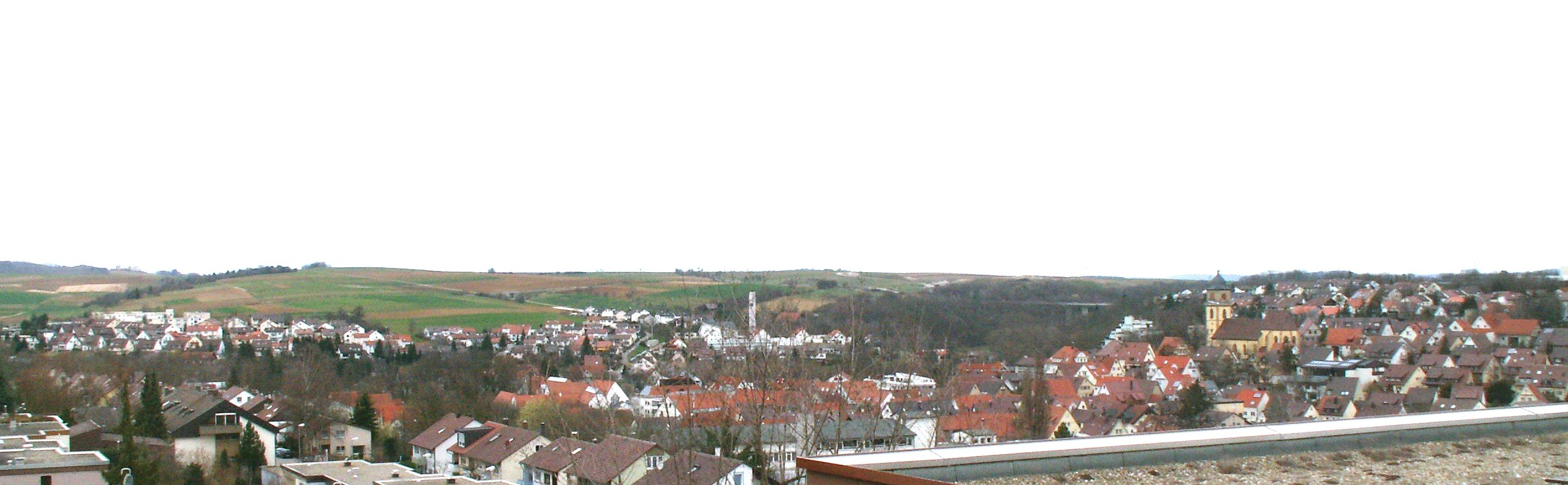
Panorama of Schwieberdingen, 2 April 2006
