= Rahman Soyudoğru =

German footballer (born 1989)

Personal information
- Date of birth: 6 January 1989 (age 37)
- Place of birth: Ravensburg, West Germany
- Height: 1.82 m (6 ft 0 in)
- Position: Striker

Youth career
- SC Freiburg

Senior career*
Years	Team	Apps	(Gls)
2008–2010	SC Freiburg II	29	(7)
2010–2011	Sivasspor	1	(0)
2010–2011	Göztepe	0	(0)
2011–2012	Rheindorf Altach	1	(0)
2012–2013	Singen 04		
2013–2023	FV Ravensburg	167	(67)
Total		198	(78)

International career
2008	Germany U19	2	(0)
2008	Germany U20	1	(0)
- * Club domestic league appearances and goals

Rahman Soyudoğru (born 6 January 1989) is a German former professional footballer who played as a striker.

== Career ==
Soyudoğru has played club football in Germany, Turkey and Austria for SC Freiburg II, Sivasspor, Göztepe and Rheindorf Altach.

== Personal life ==
He is a cousin of Turkish international footballer Ömer Toprak.
