= SpVgg Aidlingen =

German football club

- Full name: Sportvereinigung Aidlingen e.V.SSV Aalen
- Founded: 1907
- Ground: Vogelherdle
- Capacity: 3,000
- League: Kreisliga Böblingen/Calw B4 (X)
- 2015–16: 11th
Home colours	Away colours

SpVgg Aidlingen is a German football club from the city of Aidlingen, Baden-Württemberg.

== History ==
The club was established in 1907 as the gymnastics club Turnverein Aidlingen and took on its current name in 1947. The footballers are part of a larger sports club of close to 1,000 members that also has departments for handball, table tennis and recreational sport.

The football team has two seasons in the Amateurliga Nordwürttemberg (III) to its credit, but both campaigns (1974–75 and 1977–78) ended in 16th-place finishes and relegation.

The club's home field is the Vogelherdle which has two grass pitches and an artificial turf playing field for training. The main stand has space for about 3,000 fans.

Nowadays, the senior team of the club played in the tier nine Kreisliga Böblingen/Calw A2 as a lower table side until 2015 when it was relegated to the Kreisliga B.
