= SpVgg Ludwigsburg =

German association football club from 1907 to 2019

- Full name: Sportvereinigung 07 Ludwigsburg e.V.
- Nickname(s): 07er, Lombaburger
- Founded: 15 February 1907
- Dissolved: 30 June 2019
- Ground: Ludwig-Jahn-Stadion
- Capacity: 18,000
Home colours	Away colours

The SpVgg Ludwigsburg was a German association football club from the city of Ludwigsburg, Baden-Württemberg.

== History ==
The club was formed in 1907 under the name of 1. FC Ludwigsburger Kickers. In August 1907, the club then played its first game, a 0–2 loss to FC Vorwärts Stuttgart-Ostheim. In 1909, the club entered the local C-Klasse, beginning its area of competitive football.

The First World War took a heavy toll on the relatively new club, of its 100 members, 35 did not return from the war. On 17 February 1919, the club reformed itself after being dormant throughout the war and adopted a new name, VfB Ludwigsburg. The new name was meant as a sign to show that the club had evolved from a football-only to a multi-sport association.

By 1921, the VfB counted 500 members but internal strife lead to some the footballers going their own way that year, forming the RSV Ludwigsburg. VfB and RSV at times competed on the same level, resulting in interesting derbies. Both clubs reached as far as the local second division, the Kreisliga.

In 1938, the two clubs finally came together again, merging and forming the current SpVgg 07 Ludwigsburg. the aim of the new club was to gain entry to the Gauliga Württemberg, then the highest level of play in the state. SpVgg also became the owner of the Ludwig-Jahn-Stadion, the second-largest stadium in Württemberg at the time. Despite all this, the club did not achieve promotion to the Gauliga until 1944, when playing football was already almost impossible due to the worsening war situation. The 1944–45 season barely got under way before it had to be cancelled and the SpVgg managed to play only four games.

After the Second World War, the US occupation authorities did not permit the formation of more than one club in Ludwigsburg at the time, therefore, all clubs merged temporarily into the SKV Ludwigsburg. In January 1947, the SpVgg reformed and got approval from the authorities a month later.

The early post-war years were difficult for the club, its old ground was for a time occupied by the United States Army and unavailable. To entice the TSV 1860 Munich to play a friendly in town in 1947 for example, the SpVgg had to pay the other club 120 kg of fruit as money was virtually worthless at this time.

On the playing field, the SpVgg languished in the second-highest league in Württemberg, the tier-four Bezirksklasse. In 1955, it barely escaped relegation from there but then managed to improve its fortunes and in 1958, it earned promotion to the Amateurliga Württemberg (III). In this league, the club archived mid-table finishes in its first couple of seasons. In 1962, it struggled against relegation, but the season after, 1962–63, it finished runners-up to the VfB Stuttgart Amateure in what was now the Amateurliga Nordwürttemberg.

After this short run of success, the team deteriorated, falling back to the end of the table. After a narrow escape in 1965, the club was relegated to the 2nd Amateurliga in 1966. A championship in this league in 1970 earned the club the right to return to the third division.

Back at this level, the SpVgg once more managed to finish runners-up to the second team of the VfB Stuttgart. Because reserve teams were ineligible for promotion to the Regionalliga, Ludwigsburg earned the right to take part in the promotion round. In this round, the club managed to beat Waldhof Mannheim and earn promotion to the second division Regionalliga Süd. It was the club's first entry into professional football.

It lasted for two seasons in the Regionalliga, finishing 15th in the first year and 16th in the second and with this being relegated back to the Amateurliga. Back in this league, Ludwigsburg performed strongly, finishing third, second and first in the next three seasons. It also won its first Württemberg Cup in 1974. This allowed the club to play in the 1974–75 DFB Cup, where it lost to 1. FC Mülheim in the first round replay. The second place in 1975 also earned the club entry into the German amateur football championship, where it competed with very little success. In 1975–76, the club once more competed in the German Cup, losing 0–6 to Borussia Dortmund at home in the first round.

In 1976–77, the club had a bad season but recovered to qualify for the new Oberliga Baden-Württemberg in 1978, finishing fifth, the last possible spot to do so.

After a slow start in the new league and two difficult seasons, the club managed a second-place finish in 1982. Entering the German amateur championship for a second time, it narrowly lost to SV Werder Bremen Amateure in the semi-finals in extra time. After this, the club didn't play a big role in the league, eventually finding itself relegated in 1988, to the Verbandsliga Württemberg (IV). It staged a quick recovery in this league and by winning it returned to the Oberliga on first attempt. In 1991, it once more came second in this league and went all the way to the final of the amateur championship. Despite having a home game, SpVgg managed to lose 1–2 to Werder Bremen Amateure once more. Reaching the final meant however the club was qualified for next season's German Cup, where it lost 1–6 to Eintracht Frankfurt at home in the second round, having beaten Eintracht Braunschweig 3–2 in the first round.

With the reforming of the Regionalliga Süd, the club managed to qualify for this league, too in 1994. The SpVgg lasted three seasons in this league, a seventh place in 1995–96 being the highlight. However, the season after it was relegated back to the Oberliga.

After eight seasons with mixed results, the club once more found itself relegated to the Verbandsliga in 2005. Despite ambitions to return to the Oberliga, higher than upper-table finishes could not be achieved in this league and the SpVgg 07 Ludwigsburg eventually found itself relegated from the Verbandsliga in 2011 and from the Landesliga in 2018.

Following financial and personnel difficulties, a majority of SpVgg members voted at their last general meeting on 29 March 2019 to join neighbouring MTV Ludwigsburg. Consequently, the debt-ridden club ceased to exist.

== Honours ==
The club's honours:

=== League ===
- Amateurliga Nordwürttemberg (III)
  - Champions: 1976
  - Runners-up: 1963, 1975
- Oberliga Baden-Württemberg (III)
  - Runners-up: 1982, 1991
- Verbandsliga Württemberg (IV)
  - Champions: 1989

=== Cup ===
- Württemberg Cup
  - Winners: 1974

== Last seasons ==
The last season-by-season performance of the club:

Season	Division	Tier	Position
1999–2000	Oberliga Baden-Württemberg	IV	4th
2000–01	Oberliga Baden-Württemberg	IV	10th
2001–02	Oberliga Baden-Württemberg	IV	5th
2002–03	Oberliga Baden-Württemberg	IV	5th
2003–04	Oberliga Baden-Württemberg	IV	11th
2004–05	Oberliga Baden-Württemberg	IV	18th ↓
2005–06	Verbandsliga Württemberg	V	6th
2006–07	Verbandsliga Württemberg	V	8th
2007–08	Verbandsliga Württemberg	V	4th
2008–09	Verbandsliga Württemberg	VI	6th
2009–10	Verbandsliga Württemberg	VI	3rd
2010–11	Verbandsliga Württemberg	VI	16th ↓
2011–12	Landesliga Württemberg I	VII	7th
2012–13	Landesliga Württemberg I	VII	3rd
2013–14	Landesliga Württemberg I	VII	5th
2014–15	Landesliga Württemberg I	VII	12th
2015–16	Landesliga Württemberg I	VII	11th
2016–17	Landesliga Württemberg I	VII	6th
2017–18	Landesliga Württemberg I	VII	13th ↓
2018–19	Bezirksliga Enz/Murr	VIII	13th

- With the introduction of the Regionalligas in 1994 and the 3. Liga in 2008 as the new third tier, below the 2. Bundesliga, all leagues below dropped one tier.

↑ Promoted	↓ Relegated
