= BSV 07 Schwenningen =

German football club

- Full name: BSV 07 Schwenningen e.V.
- Founded: 1907
- Ground: Gustav-Strohm-Stadion
- League: Landesliga Württemberg 3 (VII)
- 2015–16: Bezirksliga Schwarzwald (VIII), 1st (promoted)
Home colours	Away colours

BSV 07 Schwenningen is a German association football club that plays in Schwenningen, Baden-Württemberg. The 1974 merger of Schwenningen SC and VfR Schwenningen that formed BSV Schwenningen 07 brought together two separate threads of the club's history.

== History ==
Two of the town's early clubs, FC 07 Schwenningen and FC Viktoria 08 Schwenningen, set aside their rivalry in 1922 to form VfR Schwenningen. The club advanced to first class Gauliga Württemberg play for a single season in 1937 and finished in last place.

BSV's other ancestor, Sportclub Schwenningen, was formed in 1925. In 1935 they advanced as far as the semi-final round of the first Tschammerspokal tournament, the predecessor to today's DFB-Pokal.

After World War II organizations across Germany, including sports and football clubs, were dissolved by the occupying Allied authorities. In 1946 all of Schwenningen's former sports associations were re-constituted in a single club known as VfL Schwenningen that played in the Oberliga Südwest (southern group) from 1946 to 1950. This club's existence was short-lived and late in 1950 VfR Schwenningen was re-formed as a separate side that began play in the Amateurliga Württemberg (III). A re-formed SC Schwenningen side was also slated to begin play in the Amateurliga Württemberg (III), but was demoted to the Landesliga Württemberg (IV) over the status of some of its players. They returned to the Amateurliga Württemberg in 1951.

VfR played in the Amateurliga Württemberg for most of the 1950s, winning the German Amateur championship in 1952. The club joined the new Amateurliga Schwarzwald-Bodensee (III) in 1960. They finished second to FC Hanau 93 in the promotion round for the 2.Bundesliga, but appeared to get another chance to advance when second division FC Hassfurt ran into license problems. However, the German Football Association ruled in Hassfurt's favour and Schwenningen would have to wait. In the late 1960s the side fell to Landesliga Württemberg (IV) play.

SC Schenningen's history roughly paralleled VfRs: they also played in the Amateurliga Württemberg for most of the 1950s and joined the new Amateurliga Schwarzwald-Bodensee (III) in 1960 to become the new circuit's first champion. They managed to avoid relegation and remained a tier III side into the 1970s.

In 1974, these two clubs formed BSV Schwenningen 07 and the new team carried on play in the third tier Amateurliga Schwarzwald-Bodensee for the 1974–75 season. They won the league title in 1976 and then advanced through the promotion rounds to play in the 2nd Bundesliga Süd in 1976–77. The following year was one of mixed fortunes: a 20th-place finish in the 2nd Bundesliga had seen the club relegated carrying a heavy debt load. However the side also made its furthest ever advance in German Cup play, going out in the third round.

In the first round of the 1979 German Cup, Schwenningen suffered a 1–14 beating at the hands of Borussia Dortmund, the most goals Dortmund has ever scored in a match.

The club stayed in the Verbandsliga Württemberg until the end of 1984 and slipped to the tier-five Landesliga Württemberg the next year. They played at that level for most of a decade before falling to the Bezirksliga (V) for eight years. Schwenningen returned to the Landesliga Württemberg (IV) in 2003, 2009 and 2011, but were relegated back to the Bezirksliga each time. The club made another return to the Landeslig after a Bezirksliga championship in 2014 but were relegated immediately once more. It continued its yo-yo existence in 2015–16, winning another promotion from the Bezirksliga to the Landesliga.

== Honours ==
The club's honours:

=== League ===
- German amateur championship
  - Champions: 1952
- Amateurliga Schwarzwald-Bodensee (III)
  - Champions: 1961 (SC), 1976
- Bezirksliga Schwarzwald (VIII)
  - Champions: 2009, 2011, 2014, 2016

=== Cup ===
- Württemberg Cup
  - Winners: 1960

== Recent seasons ==
The recent season-by-season performance of the club:

Season	Division	Tier	Position
2003–04	Landesliga Württemberg 3	VI	6th
2004–05	Landesliga Württemberg 3	VI	6th
2005–06	Landesliga Württemberg 3	VI	16th ↓
2006–07	Bezirksliga Schwarzwald	VII	9th
2007–08	Bezirksliga Schwarzwald	VII	8th
2008–09	Bezirksliga Schwarzwald	VIII	1st ↑
2009–10	Landesliga Württemberg 3	VII	13th ↓
2010–11	Bezirksliga Schwarzwald	VIII	1st ↑
2011–12	Landesliga Württemberg 3	VII	13th ↓
2012–13	Bezirksliga Schwarzwald	VIII	4th
2013–14	Bezirksliga Schwarzwald	VIII	1st ↑
2014–15	Landesliga Württemberg 3	VII	15th ↓
2015–16	Bezirksliga Schwarzwald	VIII	1st ↑
2016–17	Landesliga Württemberg 3	VII	

- With the introduction of the Regionalligas in 1994 and the 3. Liga in 2008 as the new third tier, below the 2. Bundesliga, all leagues below dropped one tier.

↑ Promoted	↓ Relegated
