= SV Germania Bietigheim Baden =

German football club

- Full name: Sport-Verein Germania 1919 Bietigheim e.V.
- Founded: 1919
- League: Kreisliga A Baden-Baden-Nord (IX)
- 2015–16: 13th
Home colours	Away colours

Germania Bietigheim is a German association football club from the village of Bietigheim near Rastatt, Baden-Württemberg.

== History ==
The club was established in 1919 as Fußballclub Germania Bietigheim in 1919, and following World War II, was reformed as SpV Bietigheim. In 1950, the club resumed its historical identity as Sportverein Germania Bietigheim.

The club's highest rise was to the third tier Amateurliga Südbaden in 1969. They finished 14th in their debut season there before being sent down following a 16th-place result in 1970–71.

A club of the same name plays in the village of Bietigheim-Bissingen (Bietigheim an der Enz), Baden-Württemberg, near Stuttgart.
