= Mërgim Neziri =

German footballer

Personal information
- Date of birth: 30 April 1993 (age 33)
- Place of birth: Göppingen, Germany
- Height: 1.84 m (6 ft 0 in)
- Positions: Left-back; left midfielder

Team information
- Current team: 1. Göppinger SV
- Number: 7

Youth career
- 2005–2010: Stuttgarter Kickers
- 2010: Karlsruher SC
- 2010–2011: SGV Freiberg
- 2011–2012: VfR Aalen

Senior career*
Years	Team	Apps	(Gls)
2011–2012	Aalen II	22	(7)
2011–2012	Aalen	2	(0)
2012–2014	Nürnberg II	14	(0)
2014	Seligenporten II	13	(1)
2014	Seligenporten	7	(0)
2015	Baunatal	0	(0)
2015	Botoșani	5	(0)
2016–2017	Prishtina		
2017	Kamza	13	(0)
2018	Ulm	7	(0)
2018	Petrolul Ploiești	3	(0)
2019	Luftëtari Gjirokastër	12	(0)
2019–2020	VfR Aalen	9	(0)
2020–	1. Göppinger SV	71	(14)

International career
2013	Albania U21	0	(0)
- * Club domestic league appearances and goals as of 1 January 2025

Mërgim Neziri (born 30 April 1993) is a German–Albanian footballer who plays for 1. Göppinger SV.

== Career ==
On 21 June 2019, Neziri returned to his former club, VfR Aalen, on a 1-year contract. On 15 January 2020 both parties accepted to terminate the contract. He then returned to his hometown Göppingen and signed with SV Göppingen on 2 February 2020.
