= SV Germania Bietigheim 1909 =

German football club

- Full name: Sportverein Germania Bietigheim e.V. 1909
- Founded: 1909
- Ground: Sportanlage im Ellental
- League: Bezirksliga Enz/Murr (VIII)
- 2015–16: 5th
Home colours	Away colours

Germania Bietigheim is a German association football club from the town of Bietigheim-Bissingen (Bietigheim an der Enz), Baden-Württemberg, near Stuttgart.

== History ==
The club was established in 1909 as Fußballgesellschaft Germania Bietigheim and was joined that same year by Phönix Bietigheim. The club was renamed Fußballverein Bietigheim in 1910 and again in 1920 to Sportverein Germania Bietigheim.

SV was lost in 1946 and a short-lived successor side made up of several local clubs was formed as SKV Bietigheim. In early 1948 it broke up into several clubs, including Turn- und Sportverein Bietigheim. The footballers of TSV became independent as SV Germania Bietigheim in fall 1950.

Germania was part of the Amateurliga Nordwürttemberg (III) through most of the 1960s and 1970s, with their best results coming in 1962 when they captured the regional WFV-Pokal (Württemberg Cup), and in 1976, when they finished as runners-up in their division. The team failed to qualify for the newly formed Oberliga Baden-Württemberg (IV) in 1978 and relegated to Landesliga (VI). They were in and out of the Verbandsliga Württemberg (V) during the 1980s before relegating to lower tier local play in 1988. They played in the Bezirksliga Enz/Murr (VIII) until 2012, when the club was relegated to the Kreisliga. Germania was promptly relegated to Bezirksliga after a championship in the Kreisliga in 2013.

A club of the same name plays in Bietigheim near Rastatt, Baden-Württemberg which is west of Bietigheim-Bissingen.
