= 1. FC Normannia Gmünd =

German football club

- Full name: 1. FC Normannia Gmünd 1904 e. V.
- Founded: 29 July 1904
- Ground: tectomove Arena
- Capacity: 5,000
- Chairman: Alexander Stütz
- Manager: Zlatko Blaškić
- League: Oberliga Baden-Württemberg (V)
- 2025–26: Oberliga Baden-Württemberg, 13th of 18
- Website: http://www.fc-normannia.de/
Home colours	Away colours

1. FC Normannia Gmünd is a German association football club from the city of Schwäbisch Gmünd, Baden-Württemberg.

== History ==
The origins of the club go back to the formation of Alemannia Schwäbisch Gmünd on 29 July 1904. This side later merged with Suevia Schwäbisch Gmünd to form 1. FC Normannia. The club managed to reach the tier-one Bezirksliga Württemberg in 1932 and played at this level for one season, before the league was dissolved.

Normannia took part in second division competition for two seasons in 1942–44 before advancing to the Gauliga Württemberg (I) where they played in the war-shortened 1944–45 season. The club returned to second division play after World War II in 1947 in the Landesliga Württemberg, later the Amateurliga Württemberg, where they would remain until sent down in 1955.

In 1965 they re-emerged in the Amateurliga Nordwürttemberg (III), capturing the division title, and then taking part in the promotion round playoff for the Regionaliga Süd (II). However, they were unable to advance and spent most of the next ten years in the Amateurliga before slipping to lower-tier competition in 1975. In 1972 Normannia enjoyed a solid run in the national amateur championship, going as far as the semi-finals before being put out by FSV Frankfurt. A regional cup win in 1977 earned the team a place in the 1978 DFB Pokal (German Cup) tournament. They eliminated second division side Fortuna Köln before being eliminated themselves by the second team squad of FC Augsburg.

After winning the Verbandsliga Württemberg in 2004, the 1. FC played in the Oberliga Baden-Württemberg (IV) as a lower table side until 2012 when it was relegated again.

== Honours ==
The club's honours:

=== League ===
- Verbandsliga Württemberg
  - Champions: 2004

=== Cup ===
- Württemberg Cup
  - Winners: 1977, 2007

== Recent managers ==
Recent managers of the club:

Manager	Start	Finish
Alexander Zorniger	1 July 2006	30 June 2020
Lothar Mattner	1 July 2009	?
Dieter Märkle	?	Present

== Recent seasons ==
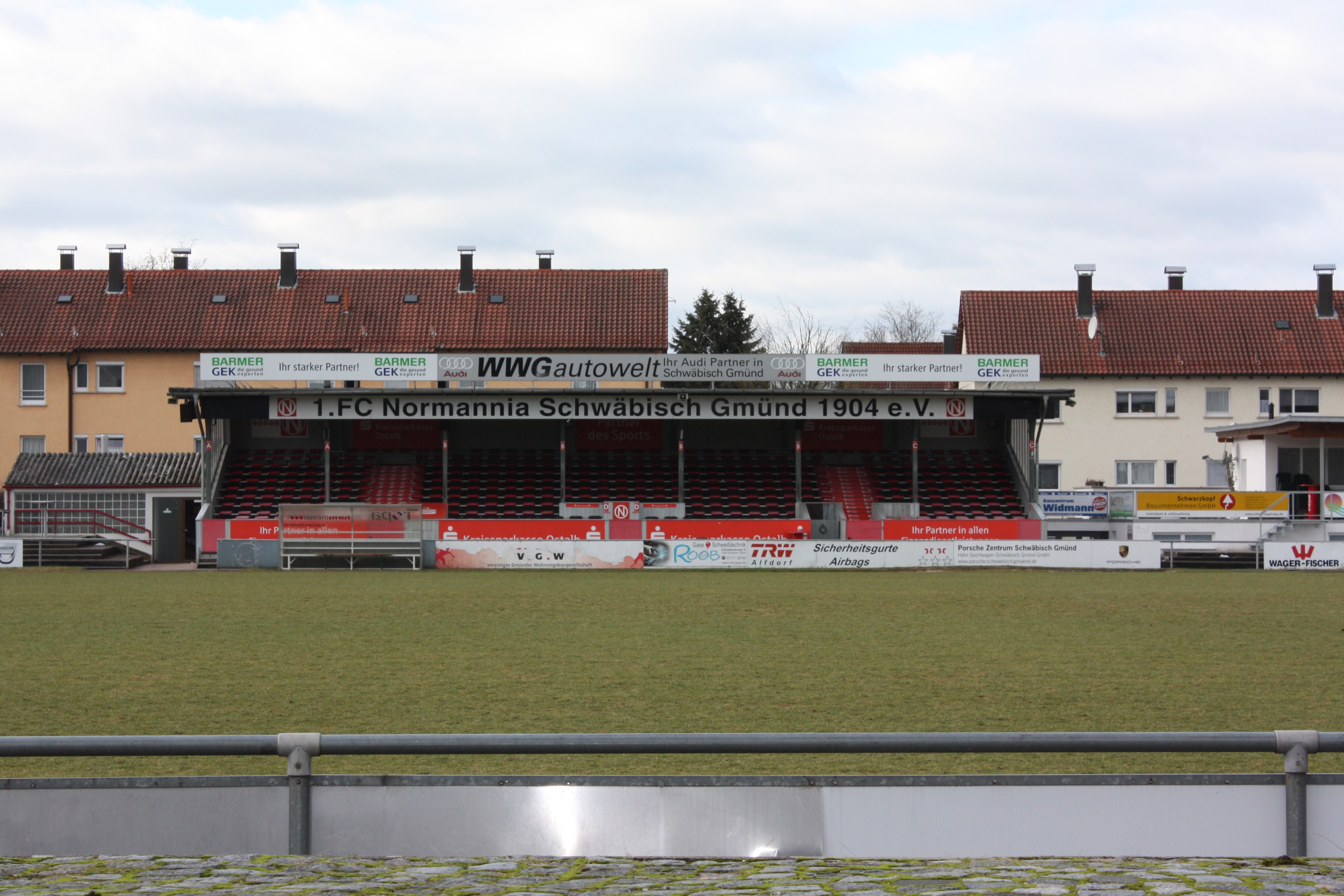
The Jahnstadion in Schwäbisch Gmünd

The recent season-by-season performance of the club:

Season	Division	Tier	Position
2001–02	Landesliga Württemberg	VI	↑
2002–03	Verbandsliga Württemberg	V	5th
2003–04	Verbandsliga Württemberg	V	1st ↑
2004–05	Oberliga Baden-Württemberg	IV	9th
2005–06	Oberliga Baden-Württemberg	IV	12th
2006–07	Oberliga Baden-Württemberg	IV	11th
2007–08	Oberliga Baden-Württemberg	IV	9th
2008–09	Oberliga Baden-Württemberg	V	9th
2009–10	Oberliga Baden-Württemberg	V	7th
2010–11	Oberliga Baden-Württemberg	V	5th
2011–12	Oberliga Baden-Württemberg	V	16th ↓
2012–13	Verbandsliga Württemberg	VI	8th
2013–14	Verbandsliga Württemberg	VI	10th
2014–15	Verbandsliga Württemberg	VI	4th
2015–16	Verbandsliga Württemberg	VI	7th
2016–17	Verbandsliga Württemberg	VI	

- With the introduction of the Regionalligas in 1994 and the 3. Liga in 2008 as the new third tier, below the 2. Bundesliga, all leagues below dropped one tier.

↑ Promoted	↓ Relegated
