= FV Ravensburg =

German football club

- Full name: Fußballverein 1893 Ravensburg e.V.
- Founded: 1893
- Ground: Ebra-Stadion
- Capacity: 7,000
- Manager: Rahman Soyudoğru
- League: Oberliga Baden-Württemberg (V)
- 2025–26: Oberliga Baden-Württemberg, 4th of 18
| Home colours | Away colours |

The FV Ravensburg is a German association football club from the town of Ravensburg, Baden-Württemberg.

The club's greatest success has been to play in the Oberliga Baden-Württemberg, the highest football league in the state, of which it became a founding member in 1978. It played at this level from 1978 to 1983, 1998 to 2000, and, again, since 2013.

== History ==
The club was formed as FC Ravensburg in 1893, the same year as fellow Württemberg club VfB Stuttgart, as one of the first football clubs in what was then the Kingdom of Württemberg. In 1907 a second football club was formed in Ravensburg, the FC Rauenegg, which soon after merged with the FCR. In the era up to the early 1930s, the club competed in the local leagues around Lake Constance (German:Bodensee), playing in an international competition, the Bodensee– Fußball–Vereinigung and Bodensee–Vorarlberg–Liga, that included clubs from Austria and Switzerland, like FC Lustenau and FC St. Gallen. When the Nazis rose to power, however, this cross-border competition ceased to exist, and the club joined the new Schwarzwald–Bodensee–Liga instead. In between, during the First World War football came to a halt and when it restarted in 1918, the club changed its name to FV Ravensburg. Around that time, in 1919, the club also moved to its current home ground, the Wiesental.

After the Second World War the club received permission from the Gouvernement Militaire Ravensburg, the local French military occupation authorities, to reform and enter the new second tier of local football, the Landesliga Südwürttemberg. It initially played under the name of SV Ravensburg but later returned to its old name. This league was disbanded in 1950, and the best clubs joined the new Amateurliga Württemberg, but FVR was not one of them.

In 1956 the club earned promotion to the Amateurliga Württemberg, then the third tier of the German football league system. It played for three seasons at this level before being relegated again in 1959. In 1960 the Amateurliga Württemberg was split into a northern division, the Amateurliga Nordwürttemberg while a southern division was formed from clubs from the former league and the Amateurliga Südbaden. In this new southern league, the Amateurliga Schwarzwald-Bodensee, FV Ravensburg entered, finishing in third place in its first season there. The club finished in the top six of the league for the first couple of seasons but was relegated in 1966.

In 1968 FV was promoted back up but was not able to finish quite as highly as it had in the early days of the league. In 1971 and 1972 the club reached the final of the Württemberg Cup on two occasions, losing the former to VfL Sindelfingen on penalties and then later to VfR Aalen despite playing at home on both occasions. From 1973 onwards, Ravensburg was an improved side in the Amateurliga, once more finishing in the upper half of the table. In the league's final season, 1977–78, RV finished fourth and thereby became one of the five clubs from the league that qualified for the new Oberliga Baden-Württemberg.

Ravensburg played the first five seasons of the Oberliga Baden-Württemberg with an eighth-place finish in 1981 as its best result. By 1983, however, the club suffered relegation from the league after coming in 18th. It entered the Verbandsliga Württemberg, a league also established in 1978, but finished last in its first season there and dropped to the Landesliga Württemberg, the fifth tier, in 1984.

After five seasons in the Landesliga, FV made a return to the Verbandsliga in 1989, with a record 4,000 spectators seeing the local derby against VfB Friedrichshafen. The Verbandsliga was the league the club would play in for the next nine seasons, generally achieving good results there. In 1998 it finished runners-up in the league, missing out on promotion until the following year when it won the league and moved back up to the Oberliga after a 16-year absence. The club came in twelfth in its first season back, but a 14th place in 2000 meant relegation back to the Verbandsliga.

Ravensburg began another cycle of dropping from the Oberliga to the Landesliga via the Verbandsliga and back. Relegated from the Oberliga, it spent three seasons in the Verbandsliga, then dropped down to the Landesliga in 2003 and was promoted back up in 2005. Upon its return, FV spent the next eight seasons in the Verbandsliga, missing out on another promotion in 2011 when it finished as runners-up. In 2013, however, coming in second behind 1. FC Heidenheim II, the team won promotion back to the Oberliga through the promotion round, defeating SV 98 Schwetzingen.

The club managed to establish itself in the Oberliga, coming in ninth in its first season back.

== Honours ==
The club's honours:

=== League ===
- Verbandsliga Württemberg
  - Champions: 1998
  - Runners-up: 1997, 2011, 2013
- Landesliga Württemberg IV
  - Champions: 2005
  - Runners-up: 2004

=== Cup ===
- Württemberg Cup
  - Winners: 2016
  - Runners-up: 1971, 1972, 2015

== Recent seasons ==
The recent season-by-season performance of the club:

| Season | Division | Tier | Position |
|---|---|---|---|
| 1999–2000 | Oberliga Baden-Württemberg | IV | 14th ↓ |
| 2000–01 | Verbandsliga Württemberg | V | 6th |
| 2001–02 | Verbandsliga Württemberg | V | 12th |
| 2002–03 | Verbandsliga Württemberg | V | 15th ↓ |
| 2003–04 | Landesliga Württemberg IV | VI | 2nd |
| 2004–05 | Landesliga Württemberg IV | VI | 1st ↑ |
| 2005–06 | Verbandsliga Württemberg | V | 8th |
| 2006–07 | Verbandsliga Württemberg | V | 3rd |
| 2007–08 | Verbandsliga Württemberg | V | 15th |
| 2008–09 | Verbandsliga Württemberg | VI | 8th |
| 2009–10 | Verbandsliga Württemberg | VI | 4th |
| 2010–11 | Verbandsliga Württemberg | VI | 2nd |
| 2011–12 | Verbandsliga Württemberg | VI | 5th |
| 2012–13 | Verbandsliga Württemberg | VI | 2nd ↑ |
| 2013–14 | Oberliga Baden-Württemberg | V | 9th |
| 2014–15 | Oberliga Baden-Württemberg | V | 7th |
| 2015–16 | Oberliga Baden-Württemberg | V | 9th |
| 2016–17 | Oberliga Baden-Württemberg | V | 6th |
| 2017–18 | Oberliga Baden-Württemberg | V | 6th |
| 2018–19 | Oberliga Baden-Württemberg | V | 6th |

- With the introduction of the Regionalligas in 1994 and the 3. Liga in 2008 as the new third tier, below the 2. Bundesliga, all leagues below dropped one tier.

=== Key ===
| ↑ Promoted | ↓ Relegated |
