= 1. Göppinger SV =

- Full name: 1. Göppinger Sportverein 1895 e.V.
- Founded: 1895
- Ground: Stadion an der Hohenstaufenstraße
- League: Verbandsliga Württemberg (VI)
- 2025–26: Oberliga Baden-Württemberg (V), 15th of 18 (relegated)
Home colours	Away colours

1. Göppinger SV is a German association football club from the city of Göppingen, Baden-Württemberg.

== History ==
The team was established on 13 October 1905 as 1. Göppingener Fußballverein and lays claim to being the oldest football club in the city. On 24 April 1920, soon after World War I the club merged with Athletiksportverein 1895 Göppingen and took on its current identity. The origins of predecessor side ASV go back to 11 August 1895 formation of 1. Athletik Klub Göppingen. This club merged with Kraftsportverein Fortuna Göppingen in 1901 to become Athleten-Klub Foruna Göppingen. They adopted the name Athletiksportverein Göppingen early in 1907, and in 1911 merged with Sportclub Göppingen.

SV first came to notice in 1934 when they became part of the Gauliga Württemberg, one of 16 top-flight divisions created in the reorganization of German football under the Third Reich a year earlier. The club only spent the 1934–35 and 1936–37 seasons in first division play, being sent down on both occasions after 10th-place finishes. They returned to the Gauliga in 1943, captured the division title, and then went out in the opening round of the national playoffs to KSG Saarbrücken (3–5). The following season was that last before World War II interrupted play across the country.

After the war, Göppingen took up play in the Landesliga Württemberg (II), but was sent down in 1948 after just three seasons. It was not until 1968 that they returned to third-tier competition in the Amateurliga Nordwürttemberg. They finished second and the next year took the division title, which led to their participation in the national amateur championship playoffs. SV moved on to the semifinals where they were eliminated 1–0, 2–1 by SC Jülich 1910.

In league play, a successful promotion playoff advanced SV to the Regionalliga Süd (II) where they found themselves overmatched. They returned to the Amateurliga Nordwürttemberg (III) which later (1980) became the Amateuroberliga Baden-Württemberg (III). They enjoyed a string of strong finishes through the late 70s before slipping away to lower tier local play in the mid-80s. It was during this period that they made appearances in the opening rounds of the German Cup tournament (1975, 1980, 1984). SV played first in the Oberliga Baden-Württemberg (III) until 1985, then in the Verbandsliga Württemberg (IV) until 1991 and then descended through the Landesliga Württemberg (V) to the Bezirksliga (VI) in 1994. Since 2007, SV have played in the Landesliga Württemberg (VI), from where they earned promotion back to the Verbandsliga in 2009. In 2013–14 and 2014–15 the club finished runners-up in the league and thereby earned the right to compete in the promotion round to the Oberliga. In 2014 it missed out to FC Germania Friedrichstal and, in 2015, to 1. CfR Pforzheim, thereby remaining in the Verbandsliga. Finishing runners-up in the league for a third consecutive time in 2015–16 the club took part in the promotion round once more, this time defeating TSG Weinheim on aggregate and moving up to the Oberliga, ending a 31-year absence for the club.

== Current squad ==
As of 15 January 2025

Note: Flags indicate national team as defined under FIFA eligibility rules; some limited exceptions apply. Players may hold more than one non-FIFA nationality.

No.	Pos.	Nation	Player
1	GK	GER	Matthias Layer
3	DF	GER	Berk Yalman
4	DF	GER	Bastian Frölich
5	DF	NGA	Jeffrey Idehen
6	MF	GER	Gent Cerimi
7	DF	GER	Mërgim Neziri
8	MF	GER	Leon Braun
9	FW	GER	Tyron Profis
10	FW	CRO	Luca Piljek
11	FW	GER	Aron Viventi
13	MF	GER	David Trivunic
14	MF	GER	Janick Schramm
15	DF	GER	Levin Steinbremer
16	MF	GER	Tim Schraml

No.	Pos.	Nation	Player
17	FW	GER	Emmanuel McDonald
18	MF	TUR	Oğuzhan Keçeci
19	DF	GER	Yannik Wolff
20	FW	GER	Noah Lulic
21	GK	GER	Enrico Piu
22	FW	GER	Maximilian Ziesche
23	DF	GER	Denis Lübke
25	FW	KOS	Henrick Selitaj
26	MF	GER	Adrian Freiwald
28	DF	CRO	Filip Milisic
30	FW	MAR	Mohamed Baroudi
31	MF	GAM	Seedy Jarju
—	FW	GER	Kevin Dicklhuber

== Honours ==
- Gauliga Württemberg (I)
  - Champions: 1944
- Amateurliga Nordwürttemberg (III)
  - Champions: 1970
- Verbandsliga Württemberg
  - Runners-up: 2014, 2015, 2016

== Recent seasons ==
The recent season-by-season performance of the club:

Season	Division	Tier	Position
2003–04	Bezirksliga Neckar/Fils	VII	11th
2004–05	Bezirksliga Neckar/Fils	VII	6th
2005–06	Bezirksliga Neckar/Fils	VII	3rd
2006–07	Bezirksliga Neckar/Fils	VII	1st ↑
2007–08	Landesliga Württemberg II	VI	5th
2008–09	Landesliga Württemberg II	VII	2nd ↑
2009–10	Verbandsliga Württemberg	VI	8th
2010–11	Verbandsliga Württemberg	VI	4th
2011–12	Verbandsliga Württemberg	VI	3rd
2012–13	Verbandsliga Württemberg	VI	3rd
2013–14	Verbandsliga Württemberg	VI	2nd
2014–15	Verbandsliga Württemberg	VI	2nd
2015–16	Verbandsliga Württemberg	VI	2nd ↑
2016–17	Oberliga Baden-Württemberg	V	7th
2017–18	Oberliga Baden-Württemberg	V	8th
2018–19	Oberliga Baden-Württemberg	V	5th
2019–20	Oberliga Baden-Württemberg	V	2nd
2020–21	Oberliga Baden-Württemberg	V	3rd
2021–22	Oberliga Baden-Württemberg	V	6th
2022–23	Oberliga Baden-Württemberg	V	

- With the introduction of the Regionalligas in 1994 and the 3. Liga in 2008 as the new third tier, below the 2. Bundesliga, all leagues below dropped one tier.

↑ Promoted	↓ Relegated
