= Amateurliga Schwarzwald-Bodensee =

Football division

1. Amateurliga Schwarzwald-Bodensee
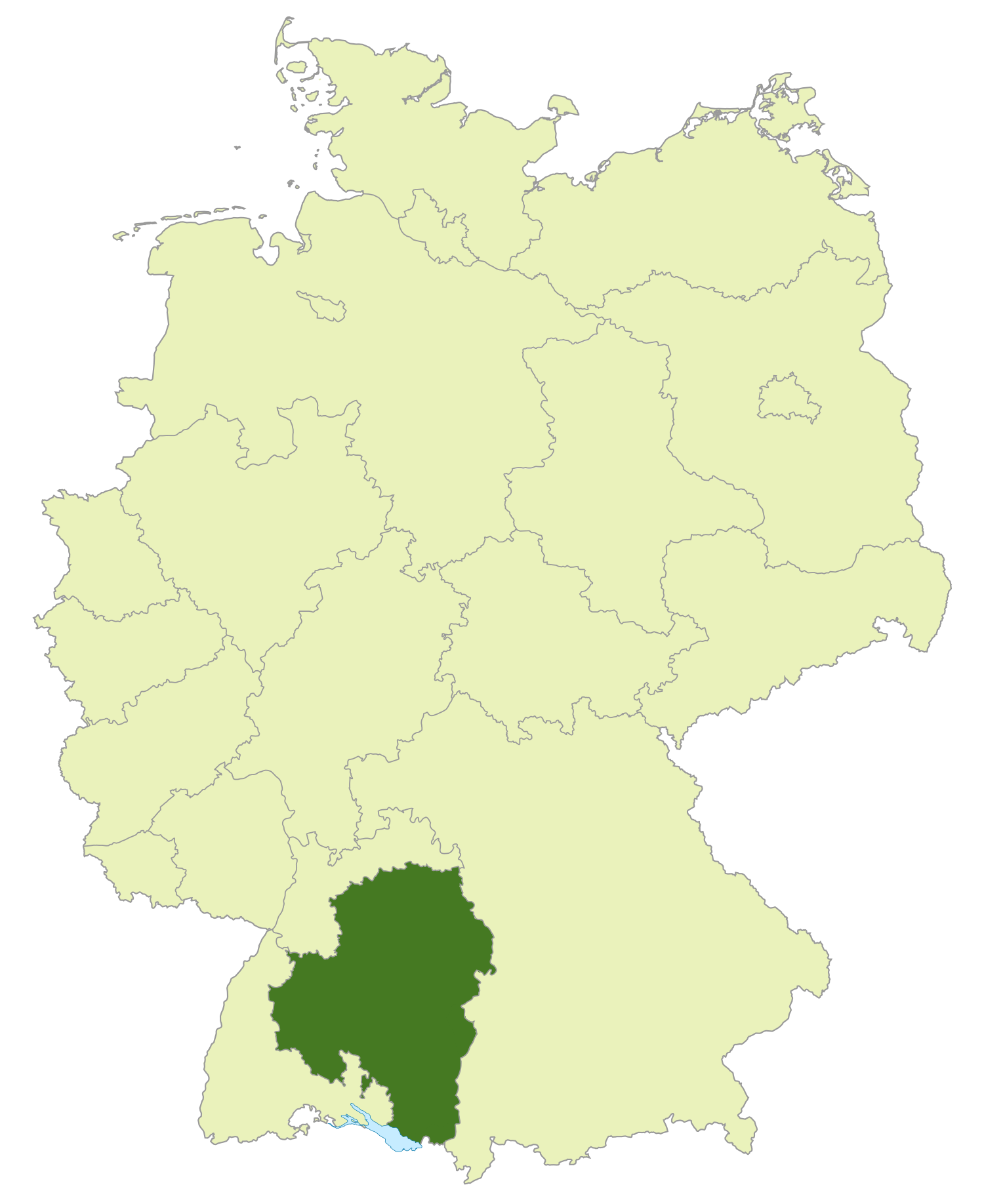
- Founded: 1960
- Folded: 1978
- Replaced by: Verbandsliga Württemberg (IV)
- Country: Germany
- State: Baden-Württemberg
- Region: Württemberg
- Confederation: Württembergian Football Association
- Level on pyramid: Level 3
- Promotion to: 2nd Oberliga Süd 1960-63; Regionalliga Süd 1963-74; 2nd Bundesliga Süd 1974-78
- Domestic cup: Württembergischer Pokal
- Last champions: SSV Reutlingen (1977-78)

Between 1960 and 1978 the 1. Amateurliga Schwarzwald-Bodensee was the highest football division in the southern parts of the Württembergian Football Association and a level three division of the German football league system.

== Founding ==
The division was formed in 1960 in the southern half of Württemberg by splitting the previous 1. Amateurliga Württemberg into the northern division 1. Amateurliga Nordwürttemberg and the southern division 1. Amateurliga Schwarzwald-Bodensee. Additionally, several teams from the south-eastern part of the 1. Amateurliga Südbaden joined the division.

The founding members of the 1. Amateurliga Schwarzwald-Bodensee were:

- From 1. Amateurliga Württemberg: SC Schwenningen, VfR Schwenningen, FC Wangen 1905, FV Ebingen
- From 1. Amateurliga Südbaden: FC 08 Villingen, FC Konstanz, FC Radolfzell
- Promoted from 2. Amateurliga Südbaden: TSV Blumberg, FC Furtwangen, FC Überlingen
- Promoted from 2. Amateurliga Württemberg: FV Ravensburg, FC Tailfingen, VfB Friedrichshafen, Olympia Laupheim, TSV Burladingen, SV Spaichingen

== Promotion/relegation ==
The winner of the 1. Amateurliga Schwarzwald-Bodensee was not automatically promoted. Instead the division champions gained entry to a promotion tournament to the superseding level two division.

Upon its inception, it was a feeder league to the 2. Oberliga Süd. From 1963 to 1974 it became a feeder to the Regionalliga Süd and finally, after 1974, to the 2. Bundesliga Süd. During all its 18 years of existence, the 1. Amateurliga Schwarzwald-Bodensee always was a level three division of the German football league system and along with the Nordwürttemberg division the top flight of the Württembergian Football Association.

== Disbanding ==
In 1974, five clubs belonging to the South Badenese Football Association left the 1. Amateurliga Schwarzwald-Bodensee to join the 1. Amateurliga Südbaden instead, these clubs being FC Villingen, DJK Konstanz, FC Konstanz, FC Gottmadingen und FC Singen.

In 1978, the new level three Oberliga Baden-Württemberg was formed to allow direct promotion to the 2. Bundesliga Süd for the amateur champions of the Baden-Württemberg state. The teams placed one to five in the last edition of the 1. Amateurliga Schwarzwald-Bodensee gained entry to the new Oberliga while the teams placed six to thirteen remained in the division, that was merged with the 1. Amateurliga Nordwürttemberg and renamed into Verbandsliga Württemberg, now the fourth tier of the German football league system. The last four teams were relegated to the Landesliga Württemberg.

Admitted to the new Oberliga were SSV Reutlingen, FV Biberach, FC Tailfingen, FV Ravensburg and VfB Friedrichshafen

To the new Verbandsliga (previously labelled 1. Amateurliga): BSV Schwenningen, SV Tübingen, FC Wangen 1905, FV Ebingen, TSV Ofterdingen, SpVgg Lindau, FC Tuttlingen and TSG Tübingen.

Relegated to Landesliga (previously labelled 2. Amateurliga): SV Kreßbronn, TSV Tettnang, SG Aulendorf, SV Weingarten

== Winners of the 1. Amateurliga Schwarzwald-Bodensee ==
Season	Club
1960–61	SC Schwenningen
1961–62	FC Hechingen
1962–63	VfB Friedrichshafen
1963–64	FV Ebingen
1964–65	FV Ebingen
1965–66	**FC 08 Villingen**
1966–67	FC Tuttlingen
1967–68	FC Wangen
1968–69	VfB Friedrichshafen
1969–70	SV Tübingen
1970–71	FC Singen 04
1971–72	FC Singen 04
1972–73	FC 08 Villingen
1973–74	FC 08 Villingen
1974–75	**SSV Reutlingen**
1975–76	**BSV Schwenningen**
1976–77	SSV Reutlingen
1977–78	SSV Reutlingen

- **Bold** denotes team gained promotion.

== Non-Württemberg clubs in the league ==
The SpVgg Lindau was participating in the 1. Amateurliga Schwarzwald-Bodensee from 1962 to 1978, although it is actually a Bavarian club. The club is playing in the Württemberg league system because Lindau is geographically closer to the Schwarzwald-Bodensee region than most of Bavaria.

During its 18 year of existence, three clubs were always present in the league, the FC Tailfingen, FC Wangen and FV Ebingen.
