= SG Aulendorf =

German football club

- Full name: Sportgemeinschaft 1900 Aulendorf
- Founded: 1900
- League: Bezirksliga Bodensee (VIII)
- 2015–16: 12th
Home colours	Away colours

SG Aulendorf is a German football club from the town of Aulendorf, Baden-Württemberg.

== History ==
The club was established in May 1900 as Fußball-Club Aulendorf and in 1934 took on its current name after the merger of several local clubs.

Lost briefly in the aftermath of World War II, it was reformed 5 January 1946. The team appeared briefly in third division play in the Amateurliga Schwarzwald-Bodensee in 1976–78 and was sent down after a 16th-place finish in 1977–78. Although still sharing some association with the parent club, the footballers went their own way as an independent side in 1992, playing as SG Aulendorf Fußball 1920 based on a foundation date of 10 July 1920. The club played at lower-level football in the tier ten Kreisliga Bodensee B2 until 2011, when it earned promotion to the Kreisliga A through a league championship. In 2013 another championship, this time in Kreisliga A, landed it back in the Bezirksliga.

The parent club has also sections for athletics, cycling, fistball, table tennis, and general fitness, as well as an association with a separate tennis club.

== Honours ==
- Kreisliga Bodensee B2
  - Champions: 2011
- Kreisliga Bodensee A1
  - Champions: 2013
