= FC Heilbronn =

Association football club

- Full name: Fußball-Club Heilbronn e.V.
- Founded: 2003
- Dissolved: 2012
- Ground: Frankenstadion
- Capacity: 17,284
- 2011–12: Bezirksliga Unterland (VIII), 4th
Home colours	Away colours

FC Heilbronn (German: [ɛfˈtseː haɪlˈbʁɔn]) was a German association football club based in Heilbronn, Baden-Württemberg formed in 2003 out of a merger between VfR Heilbronn (German: [faʊʔɛfˈʔɛʁ haɪlˈbʁɔn]) and Heilbronner SpVgg.

In 2012 the club merged with the football department of Union Böckingen to form a new club, the FC Union Heilbronn.

== History ==
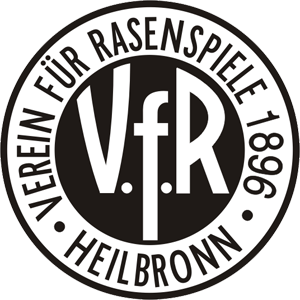
Historical logo of VfR Heilbronn c. 1931

The club was founded in 1896 as Heilbronner Fußball Club 96 and over the next decade assimilated a number of other local clubs beginning in 1900 with a high school team called Schüler Fußball Club. Shortly after that they merged with Württemberger Fußball Club to become Heilbronner Fussballgesellschaft, and in 1907, were joined by FC Amicitia Heilbronn. The team took on the name Heilbronner Fußballvereinigung in 1913 after being joined by Sportverein Adler. They finally became Verein für Rasenspiele Heilbronn in 1920 and started playing in the Kreisliga Württemberg (I). The club was briefly submerged in the widespread politically motivated mergers of clubs that took place under the Third Reich in 1934. It re-emerged as Sportverein Heilbronn 96 that same year and by 1937 was again playing as VfR.

Heilbronner Spielvereinigung was the younger side, founded in 1907 as Sportverein Adler. This club joined VfR for the first time in 1907, but was re-formed as a separate side in 1927. They joined Turnerbund Heilbronn in 1933 to form Heilbronner Spvgg 07. Through the years, the new club maintained good relations with VfR Heilbronn in all its incarnations, until the two sides finally merged in 2003.

VfR celebrated few successes during its existence. It became part of the Gauliga Württemberg, one of sixteen top-flight divisions formed in the 1933 re-organization of German football under the Third Reich, but played only 13 matches of the 1933–34 season before being disqualified after failing financially. The club was soon playing again and won a promotion round playoff in 1941 to return to the Gauliga, where they played two seasons before being relegated.

After the war, Heilbronn earned a string of indifferent results playing in the Amateurliga Württemberg (III) and lower-tier play through the late 40s and on into the mid-50s. The team captured the Amateurliga title in 1956 and advanced to the 2. Liga Süd for a single season turn in 1956–57. They were promptly sent down, but returned to second division play in 1962. VfR was again immediately relegated and failed in its attempt to win re-promotion the following season, settling into competition in the Amateurliga Nordwürttemberg (III) for a handful of seasons. Another Amateurliga championship in 1969 and a successful promotion round playoff propelled the team into the Regionalliga Süd where they played as a mid-table side until 1975. The team made regular appearances in the opening rounds of play for the DFB-Pokal (German Cup) through the 1970s. Over the next three decades VfR played in tier III, IV and V football until financial problems finally grounded them in 2002.

Heilbronner SpVgg never enjoyed even that level of success, only managing to work their way up to the Landesliga (VI) before the merger.

Following the merger of the two clubs, newly formed FC Heilbronn took up the place of VfR in the Verbandsliga Württemberg. On-going financial woes drove them down to the Landesliga Württemberg (VI) in 2004, where they continue to compete until 2011, when another relegation took them down to the Bezirksliga Unterland.

In 2012 the football department of the club left to merge with Union Böckingen to form a new club, the FC Union Heilbronn. Both clubs voted on the merger on 27 March 2012 and achieved the necessary 75 percent majority to carry out the merger, ending the history of the football department of Union Böckingen.

== Honours ==
- Verbandsliga Württemberg (IV-V)
  - Champion: 1979, 1986, 1997, 1999
- Amateurliga Württemberg (III)
  - Champion: 1956
- Amateurliga Nordwürttemberg (III)
  - Champion: 1969

== Recent seasons ==
The recent season-by-season performance of the club:

Season	Division	Tier	Position
1999–2000	Oberliga Baden-Württemberg	IV	10th
2000–01	Oberliga Baden-Württemberg	IV	3rd
2001–02	Oberliga Baden-Württemberg	IV	15th ↓
2002–03	Verbandsliga Württemberg	V	11th
2003–04	Verbandsliga Württemberg	V	13th ↓
2004–05	Landesliga Württemberg I	VI	9th
2005–06	Landesliga Württemberg I	VI	3rd
2006–07	Landesliga Württemberg I	VI	5th
2007–08	Landesliga Württemberg I	VI	7th
2008–09	Landesliga Württemberg I	VII	5th
2009–10	Landesliga Württemberg I	VII	11th
2010–11	Landesliga Württemberg I	VII	16th ↓
2011–12	Bezirksliga Unterland	VIII	4th

- With the introduction of the Regionalligas in 1994 and the 3. Liga in 2008 as the new third tier, below the 2. Bundesliga, all leagues below dropped one tier.

↑ Promoted	↓ Relegated
