= TSF Ditzingen =

German football club

- Full name: Turn- und Sportfreunde Ditzingen 1893 e.V.
- Founded: 2 July 1893
- Ground: Trumpf-Stadion
- Capacity: 4,000
- Chairman: Uli Meireis
- Manager: Jörg Holm
- League: Kreisliga B Enz/Murr (X)
- 2018–19: 2nd
Home colours	Away colours

The TSF Ditzingen is an association football club in Germany. It is located in the city of Ditzingen, in Baden-Wurttemberg.

== History ==
The club was formed on 2 July 1893 under the name of TV Ditzingen. However, it did not have a football department until 1920. The club changed its name in 1919 to TSVgg Ditzingen after a merger.

The club existed for most of its life as an undistinguished amateur club, lingering in the lower divisions of Württemberg football. The club fluctuated between Kreisklasse A and Kreisklasse B in those years, the local fifth and sixth division. Only in 1950 could it briefly gain entry to the tier-four 2nd Amateurliga.

It began its rise to prominence in the mid-1980s when a couple of quick promotions took the TSF from the tier-eight Kreisliga B to the tier-three Amateuroberliga Baden-Württemberg in 1991. One of the players in this team was Fredi Bobic, who later played for Germany internationally. Bobic was the Oberliga Baden-Württemberg top-scorer in 1991–92, playing for the TSF, with 19 goals.

In 1993, the club managed to win the Württemberg Cup, beating SV Böblingen 3–2 in the final. This allowed the TSF to take part in the 1993–94 DFB-Pokal, where it lost to Hansa Rostock 0–2 in the second round.

In three seasons in the Oberliga, the club did well enough to qualify for the new Regionalliga Süd, which was formed in 1994. Initially, in this new league, Ditzingen performed well, too, finishing 6th and 5th in its first two seasons. In the 1994–95 season, Sean Dundee scored 24 goals for the team and came second in the Regionalliga scorer list.

From 1996, the club declined however, having to struggle against relegation instead. When, in 2000, the number of Regionalligas was reduced from four to two, the TSF failed to make the cut, having finished only 15th in the league.

With the end of the club's "miracle" rise, it was handed down through the Oberliga within two seasons to the Verbandsliga. After 2008, the club went into free fall, suffering three consecutive relegations and ending up in the tier-nine Kreisliga A Enns/Murr in 2011–12. It won promotion back to the Bezirksliga for a season but was relegated back down to the Kreisliga A in 2013 and the Kreisliga B in 2015. Ditzingen went up to the Kreisliga A the next year but came down again after the season, becoming a yo-yo club.

== Honours ==
The club's honours:

=== League ===
- Verbandsliga Württemberg (IV)
  - Champions: 1991
- Landesliga Württemberg I (V)
  - Champions: 1990
- Bezirksliga Enz-Murr (VI)
  - Champions: 1988

=== Cup ===
- Württemberg Cup
  - Winners: 1993
  - Runners-up: 1994

== Recent seasons ==
The recent season-by-season performance of the club:

Season	Division	Tier	Position
1999–2000	Regionalliga Süd	III	15th ↓
2000–01	Oberliga Baden-Württemberg	IV	14th
2001–02	Oberliga Baden-Württemberg	IV	17th ↓
2002–03	Verbandsliga Württemberg	V	4th
2003–04	Verbandsliga Württemberg	V	12th
2004–05	Verbandsliga Württemberg	V	9th
2005–06	Verbandsliga Württemberg	V	5th
2006–07	Verbandsliga Württemberg	V	6th
2007–08	Verbandsliga Württemberg	V	12th
2008–09	Verbandsliga Württemberg	VI	16th ↓
2009–10	Landesliga Württemberg I	VII	16th ↓
2010–11	Bezirksliga Enz/Murr	VIII	16th ↓
2011–12	Kreisliga A Enns/Murr 2	IX	2nd ↑
2012–13	Bezirksliga Enz/Murr	VIII	15th ↓
2013–14	Kreisliga A Enns/Murr 2	IX	7th
2014–15	Kreisliga A Enns/Murr 2	IX	13th ↓
2015–16	Kreisliga B Enns/Murr	X	2nd
2016–17	Kreisliga A Enns/Murr	IX	14th ↓
2017–18	Kreisliga B Enns/Murr	X	2nd
2018–19	Kreisliga B Enns/Murr	X	3rd

- With the introduction of the Regionalligas in 1994 and the 3. Liga in 2008 as the new third tier, below the 2. Bundesliga, all leagues below dropped one tier.

↑ Promoted	↓ Relegated
