= TSG Backnang 1919 =

German football club

TSG Backnang
- Full name: Turn- und Sportgemeinde Backnang 1919 Fußball e.V.
- Founded: 1919
- Ground: Etzwiesenstadion
- Capacity: 5,000
- Chairman: Joachim Pfisterer
- Head coach: Mario Marinic
- League: Oberliga Baden-Württemberg (V)
- 2025–26: Oberliga Baden-Württemberg, 11th of 18
- Website: https://www.tsg1919.de/
Home colours	Away colours

The TSG Backnang Fussball is a German association football club from the city of Backnang, Baden-Württemberg. The club's most notable time was between 1965 and 1976, when it reached as far as Germany's second division for one season.

The club is one of four legally independent entities of the mother club TSG Backnang 1846.

== History ==
The TSG Backnang was formed on 9 May 1846 as a gymnastics club.

Independently from this club, the FV Backnang formed in 1919 as a football club. It existed as such until the end of the Second World War, when the occupation authorities banned all pre-war sport associations and new ones had to be formed. In Backnang, the Sportvereinigung Backnang was formed, which included a number of pre-war associations, including the footballers. Eventually, the club returned to the original name of the gymnastics club, TSG.

The club did not break through to the higher reaches of German football until 1965, when it earned promotion to the tier-three Amateurliga Nordwürttemberg, where it finished fifth in its first season. The year after, the TSG came second in the league, behind the VfB Stuttgart Amateure, the second team of VfB which was not entitled to promotion to the professional Regionalliga Süd. It was therefore TSG Backnang who took their place in the promotion round, where the team finished first on equal points with the Offenburger FV. In a promotion decider, TSG won 1–0 and earned promotion to the second division.

On 21 November 1967, the club separated into four independent departments, one of them the football department. The reason for this was the promotion of the football team to the Regionalliga, a professional league, which had financial and legal implications for the club that the other departments did not want to carry. TSG only lasted for one season on the professional level, finishing second-last and being relegated back to the Amateurliga again. It came third in its first season back in the Amateurliga in 1968–69, after this it became a mid-table side in the league in the following seasons. After a number of good years, the TSG finished 16th in the league in 1976 and was relegated to the fourth tier.

After this, TSG Backnang disappeared into the lower amateur leagues until 1983, playing in the Landesliga Württemberg-Staffel 1 (V), when it achieved promotion to the tier-four Verbandsliga Württemberg. It played at this level for nine seasons, before being relegated again, without truly coming close to promotion to the Oberliga Baden-Württemberg. In 1991, the club won the Württemberg Cup, beating SSV Reutlingen 1–0. After a three-year absence, it returned to the Verbandsliga in 1995, played there for three years, after which they were relegated again.

TSG made one more return to the Verbandsliga for the 2003–04 season but was relegated again immediately. After that, the club played in the Landesliga Württemberg-Staffel 1 as an upper table side until winning the league in 2014 and earning promotion back to the Verbandsliga.

The club is famous for having a single ultra, named Nico.

== Honours ==
The club's honours:

=== League ===
- Landesliga Württemberg-Staffel 1 (V)
  - Champions: 1983, 2013–14
- Verbandsliga Württemberg (VI)
  - Champions: 2019–20

=== Cup ===
- Württemberg Cup
  - Winners: 1991
  - Runners-up: 1966

== Recent seasons ==
The recent season-by-season performance of the club:

Season	Division	Tier	Position
2003–04	Verbandsliga Württemberg	V	14th ↓
2004–05	Landesliga Württemberg-Staffel 1	VI	11th
2005–06	Landesliga Württemberg-Staffel 1	VI	2nd
2006–07	Landesliga Württemberg-Staffel 1	VI	11th
2007–08	Landesliga Württemberg-Staffel 1	VI	6th
2008–09	Landesliga Württemberg-Staffel 1	VII	6th
2009–10	Landesliga Württemberg-Staffel 1	VII	5th
2010–11	Landesliga Württemberg-Staffel 1	VII	5th
2011–12	Landesliga Württemberg-Staffel 1	VII	8th
2012–13	Landesliga Württemberg-Staffel 1	VII	9th
2013–14	Landesliga Württemberg-Staffel 1	VII	1st ↑
2014–15	Verbandsliga Württemberg	VI	7th
2015–16	Verbandsliga Württemberg	VI	5th
2016–17	Verbandsliga Württemberg	VI	2nd ↑
2017–18	Oberliga Baden-Württemberg	V	12th
2018–19	Oberliga Baden-Württemberg	V	15th ↓
2019–20	Verbandsliga Württemberg	VI	1st
2020–21	Verbandsliga Württemberg	VI	12th
2021–22	Verbandsliga Württemberg	VI	3rd ↑
2022–23	Oberliga Baden-Württemberg	V	

- With the introduction of the Regionalligas in 1994 and the 3. Liga in 2008 as the new third tier, below the 2. Bundesliga, all leagues below dropped one tier.
- TSG were top of the Verbandsliga Württemberg in 2019-20 when the season was abandoned due to the COVID-19 pandemic.

↑ Promoted	↓ Relegated
