= FV Biberach =

German football club

- Full name: Fußball-Verein e.V. Biberach
- Founded: 1970
- Ground: Adenauerallee
- Chairman: Bruno Seiler
- Manager: Bernd Pfisterer
- League: Landesliga Württemberg 4 (VII)
- 2015–16: 7th
Home colours	Away colours

FV Biberach is a German association football club from the city of Biberach an der Riß, Baden-Württemberg. The origins of the club are with the gymnastics club Turngemeinde 1847 Biberach, which first formed a football department in 1903, and Fußball-Club Wacker Biberach which was established in 1925. These two clubs merged in 1970 to form the present-day side.

== History ==
=== Turngemeinde 1847 Biberach ===
The footballers of TG became independent as Sportverein Biberach in 1912 before rejoining their parent club 1931. Following World War II organizations throughout Germany, including sports and football clubs, were banned by occupying Allied authorities as part of the process of de-Nazification. A new club known as Spielvereinigung Biberach was established in 1946 out of the former memberships of TG, FC Wacker, and DJK 1931 Biberach. This team played first division football in the postwar Oberliga Südwest-Süd, but struggled to stay in the topflight. They won a relegation playoff over SV Laupheim (6:1) to avoid being sent down at the end of the 1946–47 season, but finished 10th the next year, before being relegated after an 11th-place result in 1948–49. They played the 1949–50 campaign in the Landesliga Südwürttemberg-Süd (II) and on 15 October 1949 again took on the name TG Biberach. In 1952, FC Wacker was re-established as a separate side out of TG.

1847 went on to play in the Amateurliga Schwarzwald-Bodensee (III) through most of the 1960s where they earned uneven results until their merger with Wacker in 1970. The highlight of this era was the capture of the Württemberg-Pokal (Württemberg Cup) in 1967.

=== Fußball-Club Wacker Biberach ===
Wacker was first established in 1925 and re-appeared in 1952 after briefly being part of SpVgg and TG after the war. Like its onetime partner, Wacker was part of the Amateurliga Schwarzwald-Bodensee in the late 1960s where they were a lower table side.

=== Fußball-Verein Biberach ===
TG and Wacker merged on 1 July 1970 to form FV and the new club enjoyed its most successful years through the 1970s finishing in 3rd place in their first Amateurliga campaign. That good form quickly evaporated, but the club recovered itself to post a string of top three finishes from 1975 to 1978, including second-place results in 1976 and 1978 that brought a place in the opening round of the national amateur championship. Both of these appearances ended in early departures.

Through most of the 1980s, FV was part of the Amateuroberliga Baden-Württemberg (III) until slipping to play in the Verbandsliga Württemberg (IV) after a 16th-place finish in 1986. They maintained their place as a fourth tier club in the Oberliga Baden-Württemberg (IV) following league in the reorganization in 1994 by way of a Verbandsliga title that year. However, they struggled in Oberliga competition and were sent down after finishing 13th in 1999–2000. The club made its only appearance in play for the DFB-Pokal (German Cup) in 1980 where they went out 2:1 to Borussia Mönchengladbach. Today FV competes in the Landesliga Württemberg (VII).

The club became insolvent during the 2002–03 Verbandsliga season, having to withdraw on 17 March 2003, with all its results expunged. After spending some time in the Landesliga Württemberg 4 and the Bezirkliga, the club made a brief return to the Verbandsliga in 2008–09 but was immediately relegated again.

A second club with the same name, FV Biberach, exists, predating this one by 35 years. The other FV Biberach plays in the South Baden region, at Kreisliga level, and is based at Biberach, Baden.

== Honours ==
The club's honours:

=== TG Biberach ===
- Bezirksliga
  - Champions: 1934
- Oberschwabenliga
  - Champions: 1963
- Bezirksliga Schwarzwald-Bodensee
  - Champions: 1965
- Württemberg Cup
  - Winners: 1967

=== FV Biberach ===
- Amateurliga Schwarzwald-Bodensee (III)
  - Runners-up: 1976, 1978
- Verbandsliga Württemberg (IV)
  - Champions: 1994
- Landesliga Baden-Württemberg
  - Champions: 1991

== Recent seasons ==
The recent season-by-season performance of the club:

Season	Division	Tier	Position
1999–2000	Oberliga Baden-Württemberg	IV	13th ↓
2000–01	Verbandsliga Württemberg	V	12th
2001–02	Verbandsliga Württemberg	V	10th
2002–03	Verbandsliga Württemberg	V	16th ↓
2003–04	Landesliga Württemberg 4	VI	17th ↓
2004–05	Bezirkliga Riss	VII	2nd
2005–06	Bezirkliga Riss	VII	1st ↑
2006–07	Landesliga Württemberg 4	VI	2nd
2007–08	Landesliga Württemberg 4	VI	2nd ↑
2008–09	Verbandsliga Württemberg	VI	13th ↓
2009–10	Landesliga Württemberg 4	VII	4th
2010–11	Landesliga Württemberg 4	VII	4th
2011–12	Landesliga Württemberg 4	VII	6th
2012–13	Landesliga Württemberg 4	VII	9th
2013–14	Landesliga Württemberg 4	VII	6th
2014–15	Landesliga Württemberg 4	VII	6th
2015–16	Landesliga Württemberg 4	VII	7th
2016–17	Landesliga Württemberg 4	VII	

- With the introduction of the Regionalligas in 1994 and the 3. Liga in 2008 as the new third tier, below the 2. Bundesliga, all leagues below dropped one tier.

↑ Promoted	↓ Relegated
