= TSV Schwieberdingen =

German football club

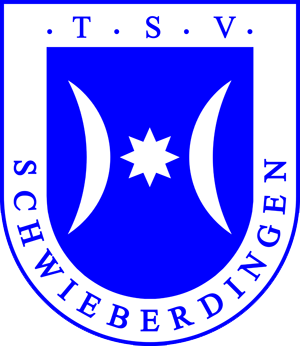
- Full name: Turn- und Sportverein Schwieberdingen; 1906 e.V.
- Nickname: The Schwiebies
- Founded: 1906
- Ground: Felsenberg-Arena
- Capacity: 5,000
- Chairman: Bodo Pfeiffer
- Manager: Jens Eng
- League: Bezirksliga Enz-Murr (VIII)
- 2018–19: 8th
Home colours	Away colours

TSV Schwieberdingen is a German association football club that plays in Schwieberdingen, Baden-Württemberg. The club was founded as a gymnastics club on 1 August 1906 with a strong labour union background and for the first forty years its primary interest remained in gymnastics. An attempt to form a football team in 1919 failed after a short time, but a second try in 1937 was successful.

== History ==
The club was dissolved after World War II, like most organizations in Germany, including sports and football associations. It was re-established as Sport und Kulturverein Schwieberdingen in July 1946 and returned to its old name in late 1947. The club's focus in the two decades following the war was on gymnastics and football, with a growing emphasis on the latter. In the late 1960s and early 1970s TSV experienced considerable growth and added ten new departments, including table tennis, handball, volleyball, swimming and judo.

Through the late 1970s the club's football team advanced steadily from the A-Klasse Enz-Murr, to the 2. Amateurliga Württemberg, and then on to the Landesliga Württemberg (IV). Weak performances there saw the team demoted but it returned to fourth-tier play in the mid-1990s and advanced as far as the round of 16 in the 2002 Württemberg Cup. In 2004 Schwieberdingen earned a promotion to the Verbandsliga Württemberg (V) where it played until 2007, when a second-place finish and wins in the promotion play-off lifted the club into the Oberliga Baden-Württemberg, where they remained for a season before being relegated again. The club decided to withdraw its team to the tier-VIII Bezirksliga Enz-Murr after this. It dropped as far as the Kreisliga A for a season but returned to the Bezirksliga in 2014.

The club's youth division has also enjoyed a fair measure of success, winning the Württemberg championship twice, the South German championship twice, as well as earning third- and fourth-place finishes in the national youth finals.

== Honours ==
- Verbandsliga Württemberg
  - Runners-up: 2007
- Kreisliga A Enns/Murr 2 (IX)
  - Champions: 2014

== Recent seasons ==
The recent season-by-season performance of the club:

Season	Division	Tier	Position
2003–04	Landesliga Württemberg I	VI	1st ↑
2004–05	Verbandsliga Württemberg	V	4th
2005–06	Verbandsliga Württemberg	V	3rd
2006–07	Verbandsliga Württemberg	V	2nd ↑
2007–08	Oberliga Baden-Württemberg	IV	18th ↓
2008–09	Bezirksliga Enz-Murr	VIII	9th
2009–10	Bezirksliga Enz-Murr	VIII	13th
2010–11	Bezirksliga Enz-Murr	VIII	10th
2011–12	Bezirksliga Enz-Murr	VIII	10th
2012–13	Bezirksliga Enz-Murr	VIII	13th ↓
2013–14	Kreisliga A Enns/Murr 2	IX	1st ↑
2014–15	Bezirksliga Enz-Murr	VIII	5th
2015–16	Bezirksliga Enz-Murr	VIII	3rd
2016–17	Bezirksliga Enz-Murr	VIII	4th
2017–18	Bezirksliga Enz-Murr	VIII	4th
2018–19	Bezirksliga Enz-Murr	VIII	8th

- With the introduction of the Regionalligas in 1994 and the 3. Liga in 2008 as the new third tier, below the 2. Bundesliga, all leagues below dropped one tier.

↑ Promoted	↓ Relegated

== Stadium ==
TSV Schwieberdingen plays its home matches in the Felsenberg-Arena (capacity 5,000).

== Notable players ==
- (Nigeria) Prince Hadedeji Mayungbe
