= Gauliga Württemberg =

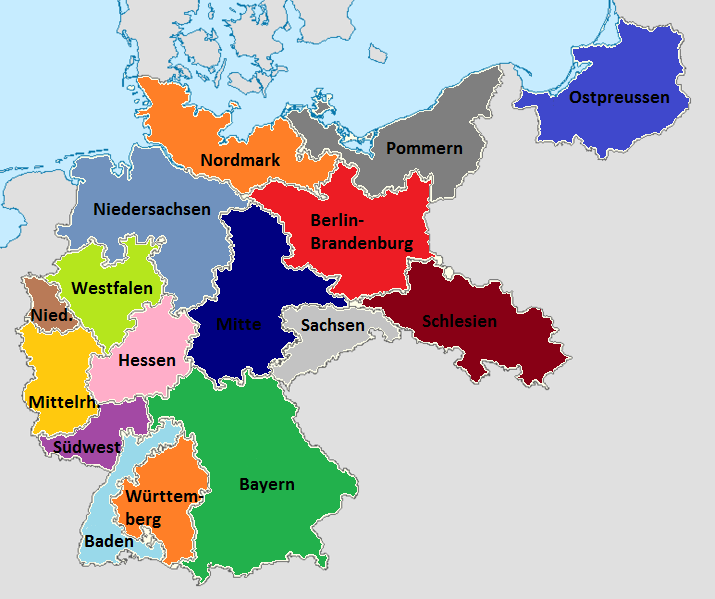
- Founded: 1933
- Folded: 1945
- Replaced by: Oberliga Süd
- Country: Nazi Germany
- State and Province: Württemberg; Province of Hohenzollern
- Gau (from 1934): Gau Württemberg-Hohenzollern
- Level on pyramid: Level 1
- Domestic cup: Tschammerpokal
- Last champions: 1. Göppinger SV; (1943-44)

The Gauliga Württemberg was the highest football league in the German state of Württemberg and the Prussian province of Hohenzollern from 1933 to 1945. Shortly after the formation of the league, the Nazis reorganised the administrative regions in Germany, and the Gau Württemberg-Hohenzollern replaced the Prussian province and state of Württemberg.

== Overview ==
The league was introduced by the Nazi Sports Office in 1933, after the Nazi take over of power in Germany. It replaced the Bezirksliga as the highest level of play in German football competitions.

The Gauliga Württemberg was established with nine clubs, all from the state of Württemberg, but the league also covered the area of the small Prussian province of Hohenzollern.

The Gauliga replaced as such the Bezirksliga Württemberg-Baden, the highest league in the region until then, but also included two clubs from Württemberg which had been playing in the Bezirksliga Südbayern until then. In turn, two clubs which had been playing in the Württemberg division of the Bezirksliga Württemberg-Baden joined the new Gauliga Baden.

In its first season, the league had nine clubs, playing each other once at home and once away. The league winner qualified for the German championship while the bottom team was relegated. The league expanded to ten clubs the season after with the bottom two teams relegated, a system which remained in place until 1939.

The only success coming to Gauliga Württemberg in the years from 1933 to 1944 was a lost championship final for the VfB Stuttgart in 1935.

In 1939–40, the league played in two regional groups of six with a four-team finals round at the end. The year after, it returned to its single-division system, but now with twelve clubs and the bottom four relegated.

From the 1941–42 to 1943–44 season the league reverted to ten clubs with two relegation spots. In its last season, 1944–45, the league had 17 clubs, split into three groups.

The imminent collapse of Nazi Germany in 1945 gravely affected all Gauligas and football in Württemberg ceased in March 1945 with none of the groups having absolved their full programs.

With the end of the Nazi era, the Gauligas ceased to exist and the state of Württemberg found itself predominantly in the US occupation zone. Only the very south of the state was part of the French zone.

In the US zone, football soon resumed and the Oberliga Süd was formed in late 1945 as a replacement for the Gauligas in the south of Germany.

== Founding members of the league ==
The ten founding members and their positions in the 1932-33 Bezirksliga Württemberg/Baden and Bezirksliga Südbayern season were:

- Union Böckingen, 2nd Württemberg division
- Kickers Stuttgart, winner Württemberg division
- VfB Stuttgart, 3rd Württemberg division
- Sportfreunde Stuttgart, promoted from 2nd division
- SV Feuerbach, 5th Württemberg division
- SSV Ulm, 5th Südbayern division
- SC Stuttgart, 7th Württemberg division
- FV Ulm 1894, 3rd Südbayern division
- FC Birkenfeld, 8th Württemberg division
- VfR Heilbronn, disqualified on 21 January 1934

== Winners and runners-up of the Gauliga Württemberg ==
The winners and runners-up of the league:

| Season | Winner | Runner-Up |
|---|---|---|
| 1933–34 | Union Böckingen | Kickers Stuttgart |
| 1934–35 | VfB Stuttgart | SSV Ulm |
| 1935–36 | Kickers Stuttgart | Sportfreunde Stuttgart |
| 1936–37 | VfB Stuttgart | SSV Ulm |
| 1937–38 | VfB Stuttgart | Kickers Stuttgart |
| 1938–39 | Kickers Stuttgart | VfB Stuttgart |
| 1939–40 | Kickers Stuttgart | VfB Stuttgart |
| 1940–41 | Kickers Stuttgart | VfB Stuttgart |
| 1941–42 | Kickers Stuttgart | VfB Stuttgart |
| 1942–43 | VfB Stuttgart | Sportfreunde Stuttgart |
| 1943–44 | 1. Göppinger SV | Kickers Stuttgart |

== Placings in the Gauliga Württemberg 1933-44 ==
The complete list of all clubs participating in the league:

| Club | 1934 | 1935 | 1936 | 1937 | 1938 | 1939 | 1940 | 1941 | 1942 | 1943 | 1944 |
|---|---|---|---|---|---|---|---|---|---|---|---|
| Union Böckingen | 1 | 9 | | 4 | 3 | 4 | 3 | 9 | | 5 | 7 |
| Kickers Stuttgart | 2 | 3 | 1 | 5 | 2 | 1 | 1 | 1 | 1 | 3 | 2 |
| VfB Stuttgart | 3 | 1 | 3 | 1 | 1 | 2 | 1 | 2 | 2 | 1 | 5 |
| Sportfreunde Stuttgart | 4 | 8 | 2 | 3 | 5 | 7 | 2 | 3 | 3 | 2 | 10 |
| SV Feuerbach | 5 | 4 | 10 | | | 10 | 3 | 6 | 6 | 6 | 8 |
| SSV Ulm | 6 | 2 | 4 | 2 | 6 | 3 | 4 | 5 | 9 | | |
| SC Stuttgart | 7 | 6 | 5 | 6 | 4 | 6 | 2 | 4 | 10 | | |
| TSG Ulm 1846 (Note: The FV Ulm 1894 merged with three other clubs from Ulm in 1939 to form the TSG Ulm 1846.) | 8 | 7 | 9 | | 8 | 5 | 4 | 8 | 4 | 7 | 3 |
| FC Birkenfeld | 9 | | | | | | | | | | |
| Sportfreunde Esslingen | | 5 | 6 | 9 | 9 | | 12 | | | | |
| 1. Göppinger SV | | 10 | | 10 | | | | | | | 1 |
| FV Zuffenhausen | | | 7 | 8 | 7 | 8 | 6 | | | | 4 |
| SV Cannstatt | | | 8 | 7 | | 9 | 5 | 11 | | | |
| VfR Schwenningen | | | | | 10 | | | | | | |
| VfR Aalen | | | | | | | 5 | 7 | 7 | 10 | 6 |
| VfL Sindelfingen | | | | | | | 6 | | | | |
| SV Untertürkheim | | | | | | | | 10 | | | |
| VfR Heilbronn | | | | | | | | | 5 | 8 | |
| VfB Friedrichshafen | | | | | | | | | 8 | 9 | |
| SSV Reutlingen | | | | | | | | | | 4 | 9 |
