= Amateurliga Württemberg =

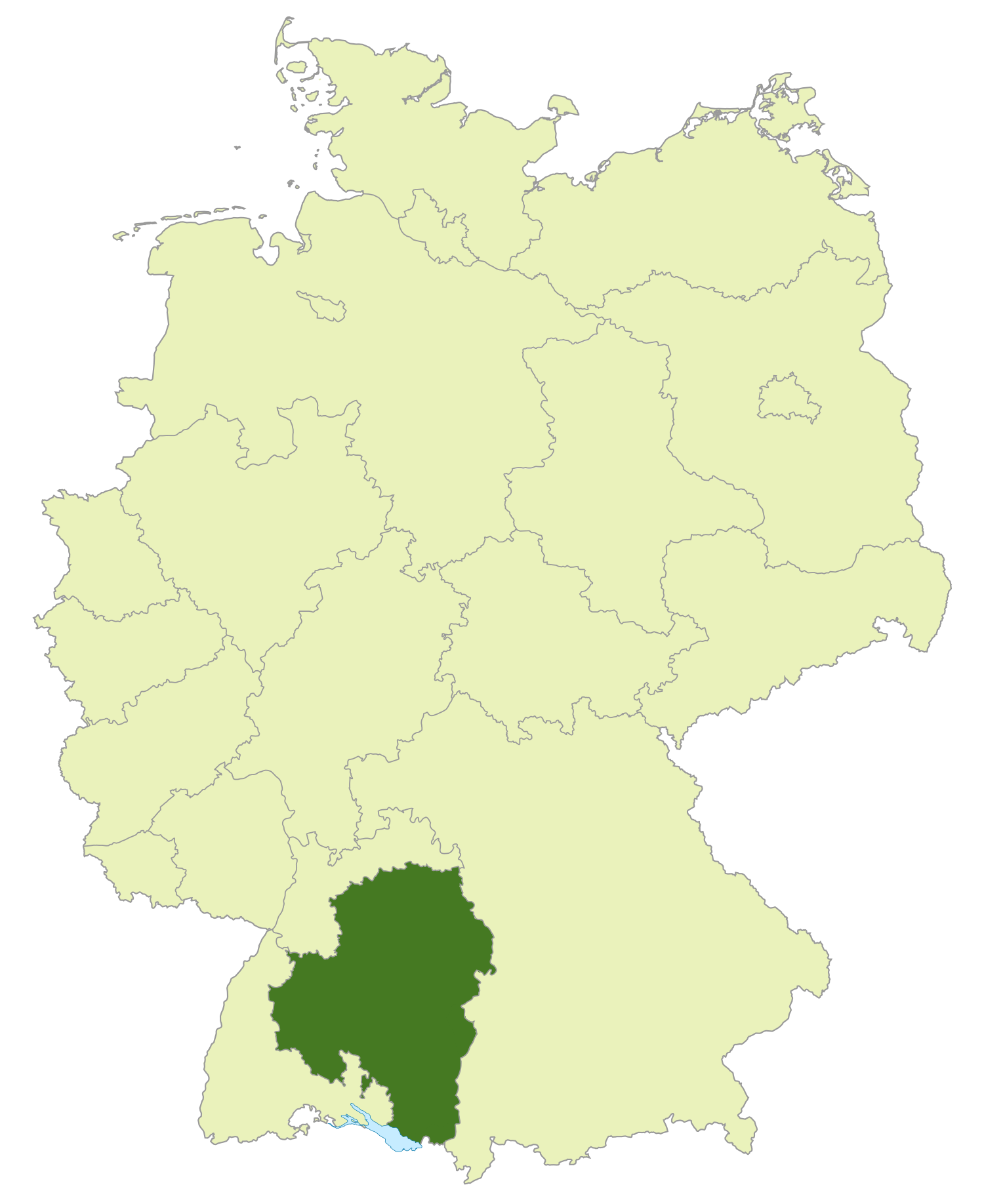
- Founded: 1945
- Folded: 1978
- Replaced by: Oberliga Baden-Württemberg (III); Verbandsliga Württemberg (IV)
- Countries: Germany 1945–49; West Germany 1949–78
- States: Württemberg-Baden and; Württemberg-Hohenzollern 1945–52; Baden-Württemberg 1952–78
- Region: Württemberg
- Level on pyramid: Level 3
- Promotion to: Oberliga Süd 1945–50; 2. Oberliga Süd 1950–63; Regionalliga Süd 1963–74; 2. Bundesliga Süd 1974–78
- Domestic cup: Württembergischer Pokal
- Last champions: SSV Ulm 1846 (1977–78)

The Amateurliga Württemberg was the highest football league in the region of the Württemberg Football Association and the third tier of the German football league system from its inception in 1945 until the formation of the Oberliga Baden-Württemberg and the Verbandsliga Württemberg below it in 1978.

== Overview ==
The Amateurliga Württemberg was formed in 1945 in the southern half of Württemberg-Baden and Württemberg-Hohenzollern, which are now mostly the eastern half of the German state of Baden-Württemberg. It was a feeder league to the Oberliga Süd and therefore the second tier of the football league system in the south of West Germany until the inception of the 2. Oberliga Süd in 1950. From 1950 until the establishment of the Oberliga Baden-Württemberg in 1978, it was the third tier of the football league system.

Originally, the league was called Landesliga Württemberg; in 1950 it was renamed Amateurliga after being downgraded from second to third tier. Along with this went the integration of three clubs from the Südwürttemberg region, which had been playing in two separate groups and four clubs from the now disbanded southern group of the Oberliga Südwest.

The separation of Württemberg and South Württemberg resulted from the outcome of the Second World War when the state was split into two separate occupation zones. The north was in the US zone and the south in the French zone.

The winner of the Amateurliga Württemberg was not automatically promoted but rather had to take part in a promotion play-off to its league above. Usually, the champion would have to compete with the winners of the Amateurligas Südbaden, Nordbaden and (from 1961) Schwarzwald-Bodensee.

The league was established in 1945 with ten teams, the winner gaining promotion to the Oberliga Süd. The founder members were:

- TSG Ulm 1846
- Spfr. Stuttgart
- 1. Göppinger SV
- SC Stuttgart
- SSV Ulm
- SpVgg Feuerbach
- VfR Aalen
- Union Böckingen
- VfR Heilbronn
- FV Zuffenhausen

The league was split into two groups in 1960, a northern and a southern group. However, only four clubs actually left from the Amateurliga Württemberg to join the new Amateurliga Schwarzwald-Bodensee. The league in the north was renamed Amateurliga Nordwürttemberg but was essentially still the same league.

The clubs leaving to the new Amateurliga Schwarzwald-Bodensee were:

- FV Ebingen
- FC Wangen 1905
- SC Schwenningen
- VfR Schwenningen

With the introduction of the Bundesliga in 1963 the Amateurliga was placed below the new Regionalliga Süd but still retained its third-tier status. It continued to do so after the introduction of the 2. Bundesliga Süd in 1974.

The Union Böckingen holds the record for years in the league, having spent 28 seasons out of a possible 33 in it, 19 of it uninterrupted from 1954 to 1973. The VfL Sindelfingen holds the record for continuous seasons in the league, having stayed there for 23 seasons from 1950 to 1973.

== Disbanding of the Amateurliga Württemberg ==
In 1978, the Oberliga Baden-Württemberg was formed to allow direct promotion to the 2nd Bundesliga Süd for the amateur champion of the state. The teams placed one to five gained entry to the Oberliga, while the teams placed six to twelve were put into the new Verbandsliga Württemberg, now the fourth tier of the football league system. The last four teams were relegated to the Landesligas.

Admitted to the new Oberliga:

- SSV Ulm 1846
- 1. Göppinger SV
- FC Eislingen
- SB Heidenheim
- SpVgg Ludwigsburg

Relegated to the new Verbandsliga:

- VfB Stuttgart II
- VfR Heilbronn
- Union Böckingen
- TSG Giengen
- VfL Schorndorf
- FV Zuffenhausen
- SpVgg Renningen

Relegated to Landesliga:

- TG Heilbronn
- SC Geislingen
- Germania Bietigheim
- SpVgg Aidlingen

== League winners ==
=== Amateurliga Württemberg ===
Season	Club
1946	**TSG Ulm 1846**
1947	**Spfr. Stuttgart**
1948	SpVgg Feuerbach
1949	FV Zuffenhausen
1950	**TSG Ulm 1846**
1951	**VfR Aalen**
1952	**Union Böckingen**
1953	VfL Sindelfingen
1954	VfB Friedrichshafen
1955	SSV Ulm
1956	**VfR Heilbronn**
1957	VfB Friedrichhafen
1958	Union Böckingen
1959	SC Geislingen
1960	VfB Stuttgart II

=== Amateurliga Nordwürttemberg ===
Season	Club
1961	FV Kornwestheim
1963	VfB Stuttgart II
1964	VfB Stuttgart II
1965	VfB Stuttgart II
1966	Normannia Gmünd
1967	VfB Stuttgart II
1968	TSF Esslingen
1969	**VfR Heilbronn**
1970	**1. Göppinger SV**
1971	VfB Stuttgart II
1972	SSV Ulm 1846
1973	SSV Ulm 1846
1974	VfR Aalen
1975	VfR Aalen
1976	SpVgg Ludwigsburg
1977	SSV Ulm 1846
1978	SSV Ulm 1846

- **Bold** denotes team gained promotion.
- In 1950 there were two teams promoted to the new 2. Oberliga, the other team being Union Böckingen.
- In 1967 and 1971 the TSG Backnang and the SpVgg Ludwigsburg were promoted as runners-up since the VfB Stuttgart II was ineligible.
- The VfB Stuttgart II and the SSV Ulm 1846 (merger of TSG 1846 and SSV Ulm in 1970) both hold a record six championships in the Landesliga/Amateurliga Württemberg.
