= Verbandsliga Württemberg =

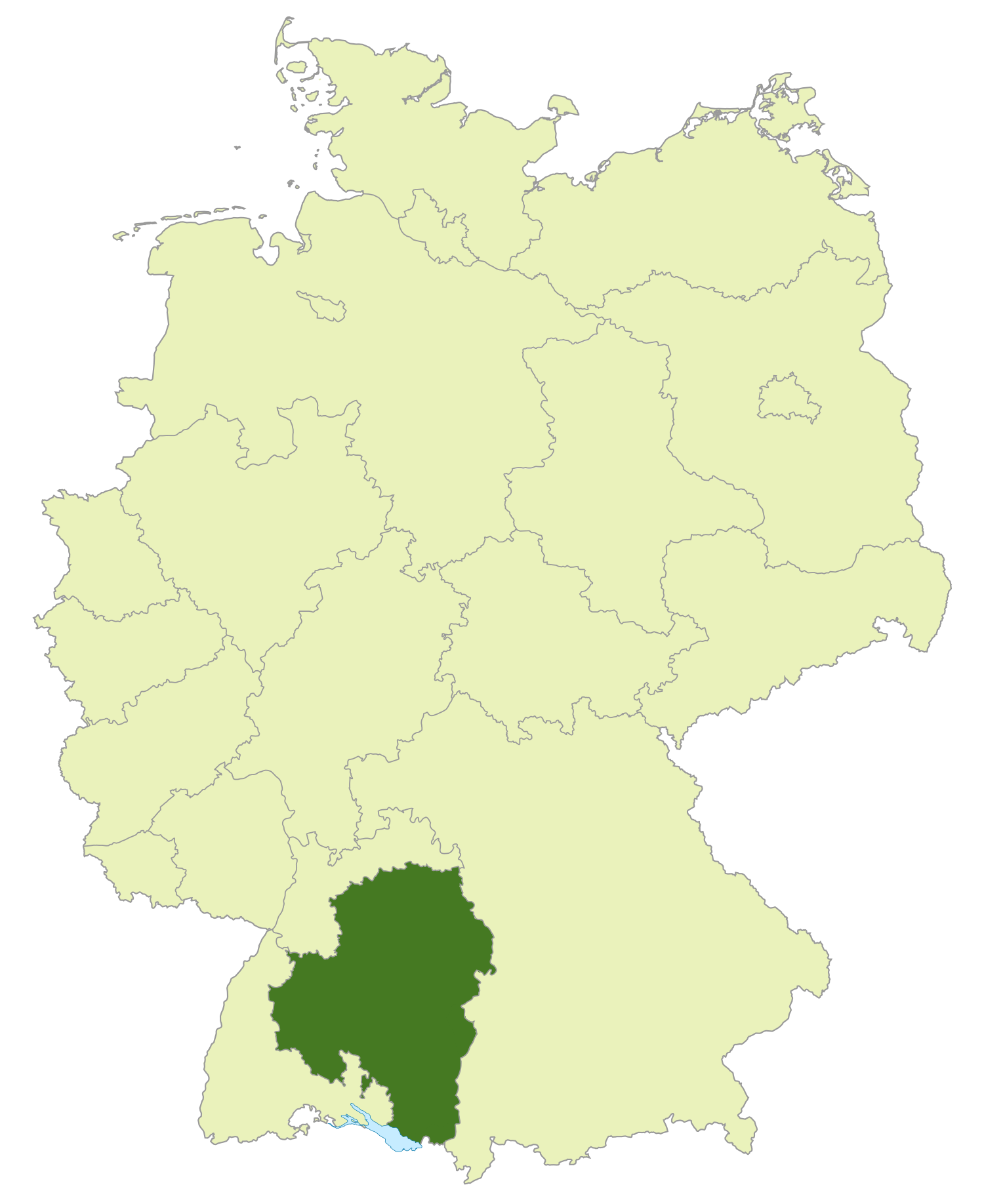
- Organising body: Württemberg Football Association
- Founded: 1978
- Country: Germany
- State: Baden-Württemberg
- Region: Württemberg
- Number of clubs: 18
- Level on pyramid: Level 6
- Promotion to: Oberliga Baden-Württemberg
- Relegation to: Landesliga Württemberg (4 divisions)
- Domestic cup(s): WFV-Pokal
- Current champions: FSV Hollenbach (2021–22)

The Verbandsliga Württemberg is a German amateur football division administered by the Württemberg Football Association, one of the 21 German state football associations. Being the top flight of the Württemberg state association, the Verbandsliga is currently a level 6 division of the German football league system.

== History ==
The Verbandsliga Württemberg was introduced along with the superordinate Oberliga Baden-Württemberg in 1978 as a merger between the Amateurliga Nordwürttemberg and the Amateurliga Schwarzwald-Bodensee. The top five teams of both divisions were promoted to the new Oberliga while the teams ranked six to twelve remained at Verbandsliga level. Both 13th ranked teams had to play a decider for the last Verbandsliga spot. All other teams were relegated to the Landesliga.

Since its introduction, the Verbandsliga always was at the top of the Württemberg football league system and was set at level 4 of the German football league system originally. After the introduction of both the Regionalliga Süd in 1994 and of the 3. Liga in 2008, as of today has been downgraded to level 6 of the system.

There are some clubs from western Bavaria playing in the Württemberg football league system. At last the SpVgg Au/Iller played in the Verbandsliga during the 2009-10 season. Au/Iller is a part of the town Illertissen. The FV Illertissen also played in the Verbandsliga and even gained promotion to Oberliga in 2008 before leaving the Württemberg system in 2012 by joining the Bavarian Football Association upon introduction of the Regionalliga Bayern.

== Promotion and relegation ==
The Verbandsliga champions gain direct promotion to the Oberliga. The runners-up must play-off against the winner of the Verbandsliga Nordbaden versus Südbaden runners-up series for one additional promotion. In 1981 no extra spot and in 1994 three extra spots were available due to league format changes.

Feeder leagues to the Verbandsliga Württemberg

- Landesliga Württemberg 1
- Landesliga Württemberg 2
- Landesliga Württemberg 3
- Landesliga Württemberg 4

Usually, the teams ranked last four in the Verbandsliga are relegated to Landesliga directly. The winners of each of the four Landesliga divisions win direct promotion to the Verbandsliga. The fifth-last team of the Verbandsliga have to play-off against the best Landesliga runner-up for one spot in the Verbandsliga. The number of direct relegations can vary depending on the number of Württembergian teams relegating from the Oberliga Baden-Württemberg to the Verbandsliga.

== League champions & runners-up ==
The league champions and runners-up of the league.

Season	Champions	Runners-up
1978–79	VfR Heilbronn	**VfB Stuttgart II**
1979–80	VfR Aalen	**SSV Reutlingen**
1980–81	Sportfreunde Schwäbisch-Hall	SpVgg Au/Iller
1981–82	TSV Ofterdingen	Stuttgarter Kickers II
1982–83	VfR Aalen	Stuttgarter Kickers II
1983–84	FC Marbach	**SC Geislingen**
1984–85	SSV Reutlingen	FC Wangen
1985–86	VfR Heilbronn	**VfL Kirchheim/Teck**
1986–87	SC Geislingen	FC Tailfingen
1987–88	FC Tailfingen	**VfR Aalen**
1988–89	SpVgg Ludwigsburg	VfB Stuttgart II
1989–90	VfB Stuttgart II	**VfL Sindelfingen**
1990–91	TSF Ditzingen	**Stuttgarter Kickers II**
1991–92	VfL Kirchheim/Teck	**SC Geislingen**
1992–93	GSV Maichingen	**VfR Aalen**
1993–94	FV Biberach	**TSV Wäldenbronn**
1994–95	SV Bonlanden	**FC Wangen**
1995–96	SV Böblingen	SpVgg Au/Iller
1996–97	VfR Heilbronn	FV Ravensburg
1997–98	FV Ravensburg	**Sportfreunde Dorfmerkingen**
1998–99	SpVgg Au/Iller	**VfR Heilbronn**
1999–2000	Sportfreunde Dorfmerkingen	**Stuttgarter Kickers II**

Season	Champions	Runners-up
2000–01	**SGV Freiberg**	SpVgg Böblingen
2001–02	**SV Bonlanden**	**SSV Ulm 1846**
2002–03	**TSV Crailsheim**	Heidenheimer SB
2003–04	**1. FC Normannia Gmünd**	**Heidenheimer SB**
2004–05	**SG Sonnenhof Großaspach**	TSG Balingen
2005–06	**SV Bonlanden**	TSG Balingen
2006–07	**VfL Kirchheim/Teck**	**TSV Schwieberdingen**
2007–08	**TSG Balingen**	**SpVgg Au/Iller**
2008–09	**SV Bonlanden**	FSV 08 Bissingen
2009–10	**FSV Hollenbach**	**VfB Neckarrems**
2010–11	**SV Bonlanden**	FV Ravensburg
2011–12	**SGV Freiberg**	**FSV 08 Bissingen**
2012–13	**1. FC Heidenheim II**	**FV Ravensburg**
2013–14	**VfR Aalen II**	1. Göppinger SV
2014–15	**FSV 08 Bissingen**	1. Göppinger SV
2015–16	**Neckarsulmer Sport-Union**	**1. Göppinger SV**
2016–17	**SGV Freiberg**	**TSG Backnang 1919**
2017–18	**1. FC Normannia Gmünd**	**TSV Ilshofen**
2018–19	**Sportfreunde Dorfmerkingen**	FSV Hollenbach
2019–20	**TSG Backnang 1919**	FSV Hollenbach
2020–21	No champions	No runners-up
2021–22	**FSV Hollenbach**	**FC Holzhausen**

Source: "Verbandsliga Württemberg". Das deutsche Fußball-Archiv.

- Promoted teams in **bold**.
- With five titles SV Bonlanden is the record league champion.
- With SpVgg Au/Iller the title went to Bavaria in 1999.
- In 2008 third-placed FV Illertissen was also promoted.

== League placings ==
The complete list of clubs in the league and their league placings since 1994.

Club	S	95	96	97	98	99	00	01	02	03	04	05	06	07	08	09	10	11	12	13	14	15	16	17	18	19	20	21	22	23
1. FC Heidenheim ^{3}	11					3	5	10	8	2	2	O	O	O	O	R	3L	3L	3L	3L	3L	2B	2B	2B	2B	2B	2B	2B	2B	2B
SG Sonnenhof Großaspach	3									8	8	1	O	O	O	O	R	R	R	R	R	3L	3L	3L	3L	3L	3L	R	R	O
FV Illertissen	5										11	6	7	9	3	O	O	O	O	R	R	R	R	R	R	R	R	R	R	R
SSV Ulm 1846 ^{2}	1	R	R	R	R	2B	B	2B	2	O	O	O	O	O	O	R	R	R	O	R	R	O	O	R	R	R	R	R	R	R
Stuttgarter Kickers II ^{9}	15			13	11	12	2	O	O	O	O	O	O	O	O	O	O	O	O	O	O	O	O	O						
TSG Balingen	13		10	11	8	10	7	3	7	12	7	2	2	5	1	O	O	O	O	O	O	O	O	O	O	R	R	R	R	R
FV Ravensburg	21	12	11	2	1	O	O	6	12	15			8	3	15	8	4	2	5	2	O	O	O	O	O	O	O	O	O	O
FSV 08 Bissingen	8													11	11	2	6	3	2	O	3	1	O	O	O	O	O	O	O	O
Neckarsulmer SU	3																				4	6	1	O	O	O	O	O	O	O
1. Göppinger SV	13																8	4	3	3	2	2	2	O	O	O	O	O	O	O
SGV Freiberg	10	11	6	9	14		9	1	O	O	O	O	O	O	O	O	O	O	1	O	O	O	O	1	O	O	O	O	O	O
TSV Ilshofen	3																						6	3	2	O	O	O	O	x
Sportfreunde Dorfmerkingen	8				2	O	1	O	O	O	6	11	12	16											3	1	O	O	O	x
TSG Backnang 1919	17		9	6	15						14											7	5	2	O	O	1	O	O	O
FSV Hollenbach	8														5	3	1	O	O	O	O	O	O	O	4	2	2	2	1	O
FC Holzhausen	2																											9	2	O
SSV Ehingen-Süd	5																								8	5	4	7	3	x
1. FC Normannia Gmünd	11									5	1	O	O	O	O	O	O	O	O	8	10	4	7	9	1	O	3	6	4	x
TSV Essingen	9																		14			5	3	6	9	4	8	1	5	x
TSV Berg	7																				8	8	9	14			10	4	6	x
TSG Hofherrnweiler-Unterromb.	3																										13	19	7	x
TSG Tübingen	6																								6	8	7	12	8	x
SV Fellbach	11				6	4	4	9	16				11	10	16												16	11	9	x
VfL Pfullingen	8																							4	14		12	15	10	x
VfL Sindelfingen	23	9	8	12	5	5	13								7	12					15		10	8	11	7	9	13	11	x
Calcio Leinfelden-Echterdingen	6																							7	10	9	5	10	12	x
SKV Rutesheim	8															10	12	14							13	3	6	16	13	x
FC Wangen 05	37	2	O	3	12	11	6	4	14			7	16		14	14		8	8	9	7	16		11	5	10	17	8	14	x
TSV Crailsheim ^{6}	4								4	1	O	O	O	O	O	O	O											3	15	
Türk Spor Neu-Ulm	2																											14	16	
1. FC Heiningen	5																						13			6	11	5	17	
TSV Heimerdingen	3																										14	20	18	
VfB Friedrichshafen	14	7	15							13						11	13		15									17	19	
VfB Neckarrems	12																2	O	10	10	6	11	4	5	12	11	15	18	20	
VfL Nagold	9															4	10	15			12	10	15			12				x
SV Breuningsweiler	1																									13				
FV Olympia Laupheim	13										4	3	4	7	10	7	11	6	13			13	12	16		14				
FV Löchgau	2																							13		15				
FC Albstadt	11					6	10	15											9	12	9	9	11	10	7	16				
TSG Öhringen	1																								15					
Sportfreunde Schwäbisch Hall	17																		7	4	5	3	8	12	16					x
SV Zimmern	1																							15						
SpVgg Böblingen	22	4	1	O	O	O	3	2	5	7	3	10	13						6	7	11	12	14							
TSG Balingen II	1																						16							
VfR Aalen II	6														8	9	5	10	11		1	O								
Rot-Weiß Weiler	2						14															14								
FC Gärtringen	3													13			14					15								
1. FC Heidenheim II ^{8}	3																	7	4	1	O									
1. FC Frickenhausen	7											15			9	5	9	13		11	13									
SG Sonnenhof Großaspach II	2																			5	14									
SV Bonlanden	10	1	O	O	O	O	O	O	1	O	O	O	1	O	6	1	O	1	O	6	16									
VfB Bösingen	1																			13										
VfL Kirchheim/Teck ^{4}	10	O	O	O	R	O	O	O	3	3	12	10	9	1	O	O	O	O		14										
TSG Ehingen	1																			15										
SV Hellas 94 Bietigheim	1																			16										
Tura Untermünkheim	2																	5	12											
SV Nehren	2																	9	16											
TSV Münchingen	2																	11	17											
TV Echterdingen	2																7	12												
SpVgg Ludwigsburg	7	R	R	R	O	O	O	O	O	O	O	O	6	8	4	6	3	16												
SV Oberzell	6								15								15													
SpVgg Au/Iller	16		2	4	3	1	O	O	O	O	O	8	10	4	2	O	16													
FV Biberach	9	O	O	O	O	O	O	12	10	16						13														x
1. FC Donzdorf	2													15		15														
TSF Ditzingen	8	R	R	R	R	R	R	O	O	4	12	9	5	6	12	16														
TSV Schwieberdingen ^{7}	3											4	3	2	O															
SV Baustetten	3													12	13															
TSV Hildrizhausen	1													14																
TuS Metzingen	5				16					10	5	5	14																	
TB Kirchentellinsfurt	1												15																	
FC Eislingen	2												17																	
FV Rottweil	4							5	6	14		13																		
SG Schorndorf	1											14																		
TSV Schönaich	7					8	12	11	11	9	9	16																		
FC Heilbronn ^{5}	1																													
SSV Reutlingen II	5						8	8	9	6	16																			
VfR Heilbronn ^{5}	15	10	4	1	O	2	O	O	O	11																				
TSV Ofterdingen	19	13	7	7	15			13		15																				
FV Zuffenhausen	22	6	3	5	4	13		7	17																					
Viktoria Schwäbisch Gmünd	2						11	13																						
SpVgg Renningen	17	8	14			14		14																						
TSV Allmendingen	1							16																						
SV Mochenwangen	5			10	9	9	15																							
TSV Wäldenbronn	4	O	O	O	O	7	16																							
FC Isny	2				10	16																								
SC Geislingen	7	O	O	8	13																									x
TuS Ergenzingen	1			14																										
SC Korb	1			15																										
TSV Plietzhausen	7		12	16																										
TSV Eltingen	9	5	7	17																										
SV Berlichingen	4	3	5																											
FC Marbach	7	14	16																											
GSV Maichingen ^{1}	4	O																												
VfL Herrenberg	8	15																												
SV Tübingen	1	16																												

=== Key ===
Symbol	Key
B	Bundesliga
2B	2. Bundesliga
3L	3. Liga
R	Regionalliga Süd (1994–2012) Regionalliga Südwest (2012–present)
O	Oberliga Baden-Württemberg
1	League champions
No.	Final position in the league
x	Playing in current season
Blank	Played at a league level below this league

- S = No of seasons in league (as of 2022–23)

=== Notes ===
- ^{1} In 1995, GSV Maichingen withdrew their team from the Oberliga.
- ^{2} In 2001, SSV Ulm 1846 withdrew from the 2nd Bundesliga to the Verbandsliga for financial reasons.
- ^{3} In 2007, the football department of SB Heidenheim left the club to form 1. FC Heidenheim 1846.
- ^{4} In 2011, VfL Kirchheim/Teck voluntarily withdrew from the league.
- ^{5} In 2003, VfR Heilbronn merged with SpVgg Heilbronn to form FC Heilbronn.
- ^{6} In 2010, TSV Crailsheim withdrew their team from the Oberliga.
- ^{7} In 2008, TSV Schwieberdingen withdrew their team from the Oberliga.
- ^{8} In 2014, 1. FC Heidenheim withdrew their reserve team from the Oberliga.
- ^{9} In 2017, Stuttgarter Kickers withdrew their reserve team from the Oberliga.
