= Domenico Egidio Rossi =

Italian architect and master builder

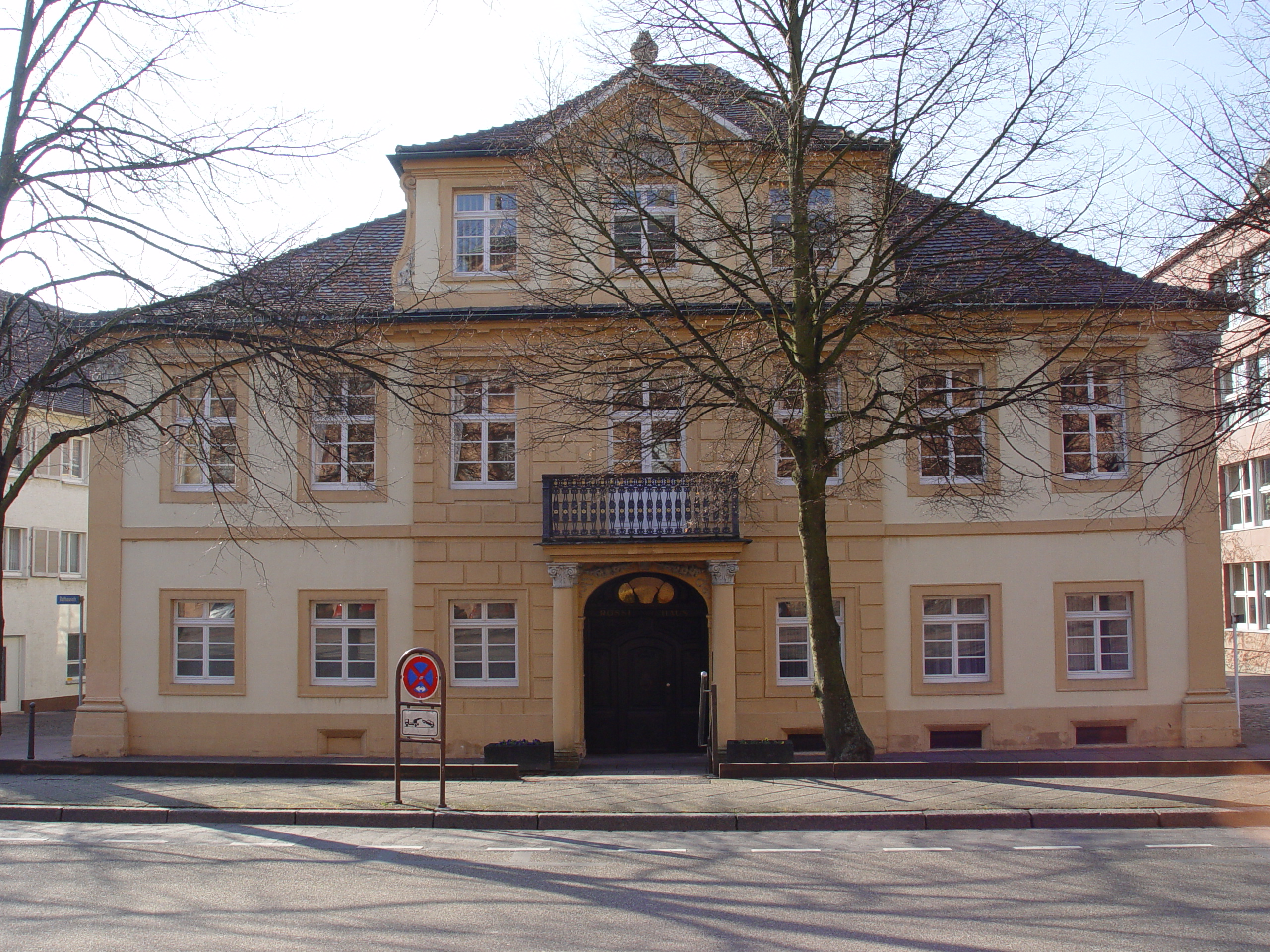
- The Rossi-Haus in Rastatt
- Born: 1 September 1659; Fano
- Died: 19 February 1715 (aged 55); Fano
- Occupation: Architect

Domenico Egidio Rossi (1 September 1659, Fano – 19 February 1715, Fano) was an Italian architect and master builder, most notable for his design of the Schloss Rastatt.

== Biography ==
Born in Fano on the Adriatic coast, he served his apprenticeship as an architect and painter in Bologna and then moved to Vienna, where he worked for the princes of Liechtenstein. He then went to Prague, where he worked for several noble families; 1692-1695 he lent his work to Count Herman James Czernin (Hermann Jakob Czernin von Chudenitz). From the Bohemian city he had to flee to Vienna after he threatened a plasterer with a sword and n arrest warrant was issued against him. In the Austrian capital, he went back to the service of the House of Liechtenstein.

From 1697, he was employed by Louis William, Margrave of Baden-Baden, where he became chief architect in Rastatt. The projects and the work of Rossi were instrumental in the renewal of urban development of Rastatt, the city he left one of his most important works: the castle. Rossi was also active at the court of the Margraviate of Baden-Durlach, until he returned to Italy in 1708, in Parma, where he entered the service of Duke Francesco Farnese.

In Rastatt, Rossi lived with his wife, Anna Magdalena, and their four children until the death of the Marquis in January 1707. The Margrave's widow said the court architect was too expensive, so in 1707 they dismissed him a few weeks after the death of the Marquis and his pupil Lorenzo di Sale was appointed the new court builder. Rossi then returned to Italy in 1708, where he worked for the Duke of Parma and Francesco Maria Farnese. 1708 Rossi was pulled from the Countess's employment because of damage to the roof and the ceiling of the Rastatt castle. Held accountable, in 1708 he was initially arrested in Mantua, but soon was set free again.

=== Schloss Rastatt ===
Schloss Rastatt is a baroque schloss in Rastatt, Germany. The palace and the Garden were built between 1700 and 1707 by the Italian architect Domenico Egidio Rossi as ordered by Margrave Louis William of Baden.

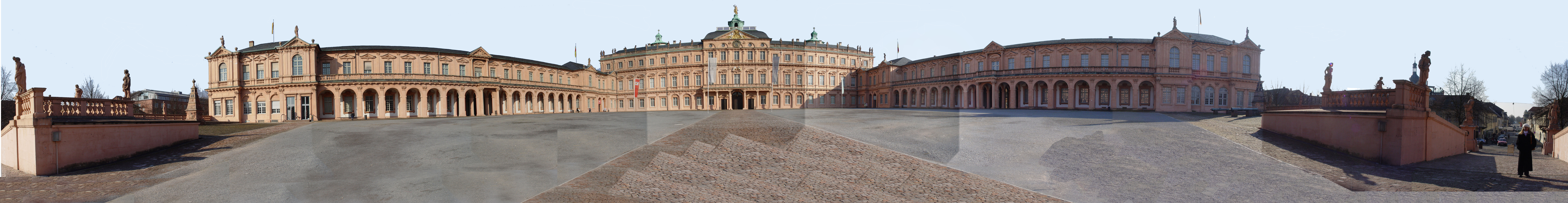
View of the castle
