= Wehrgeschichtliches Museum Rastatt =

Museum in Germany

Coordinates: 48°51′29″N 8°12′19″E

Wehrgeschichtliches Museum im Schloss Rastatt
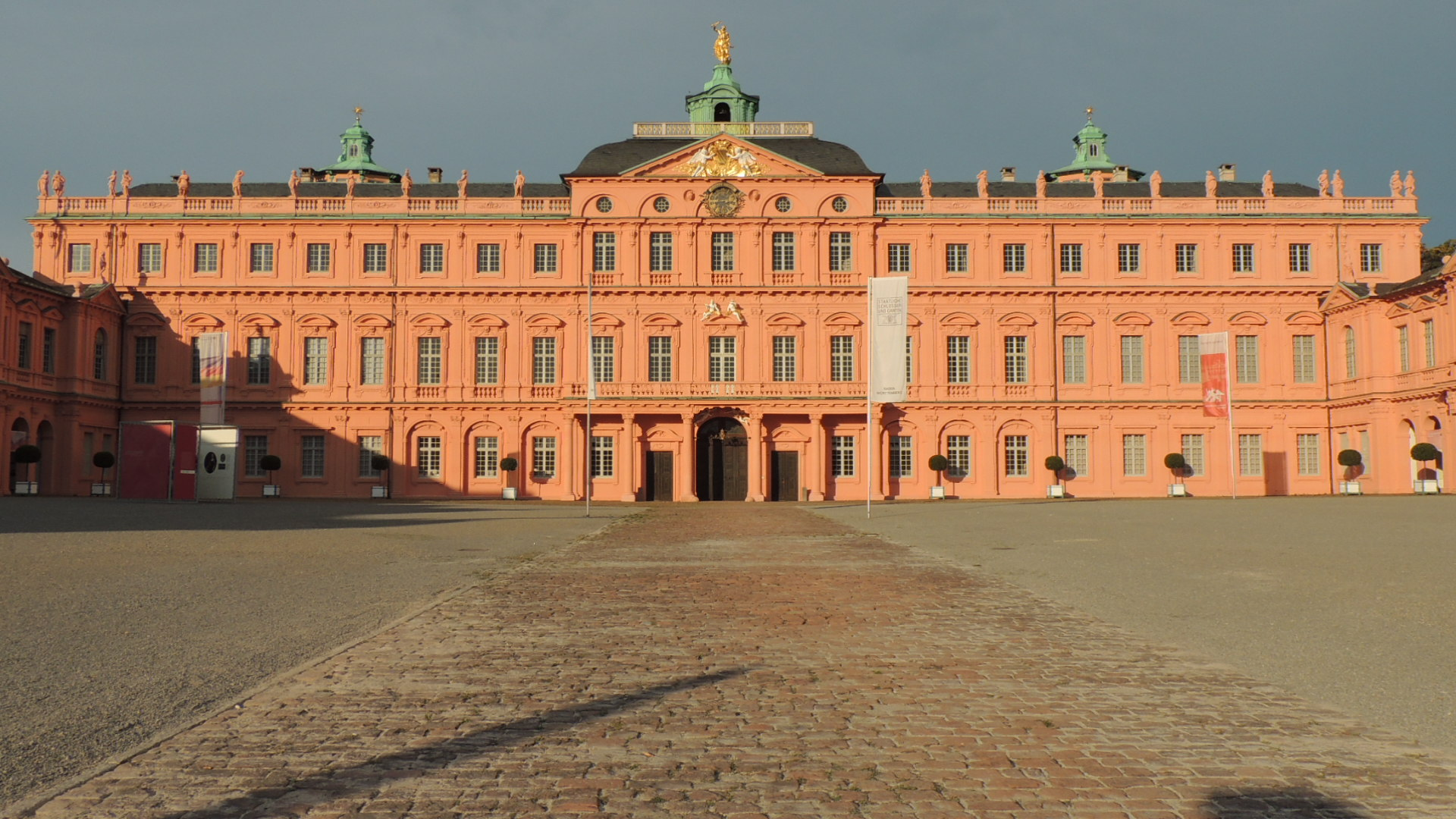
- Established: 1934
- Location: Schloss Rastatt, Rastatt, Germany
- Type: Military museum
- Website: wgm-rastatt.de

The Wehrgeschichtliches Museum Rastatt (in English: Military History Museum) or WGM is a military historical museum in Rastatt, Germany. Since 1956, it has been housed in the south wing of the Schloss Rastatt. The museum was originally found in 1934 as the Badisches Armeemuseum. In 1969, the museum changed its name to Wehrgeschichtliches Museum.

== Gallery ==
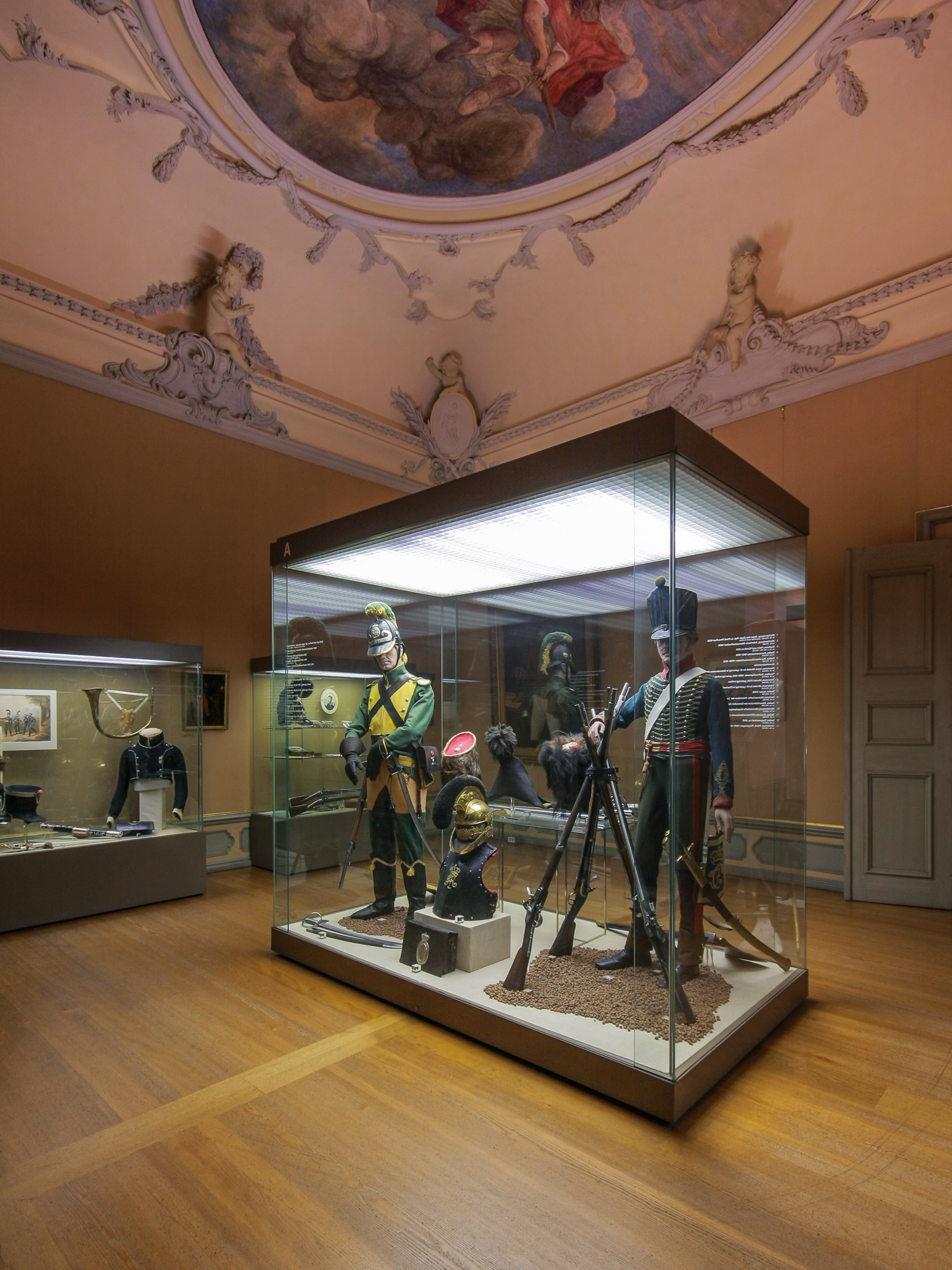
Uniforms on display

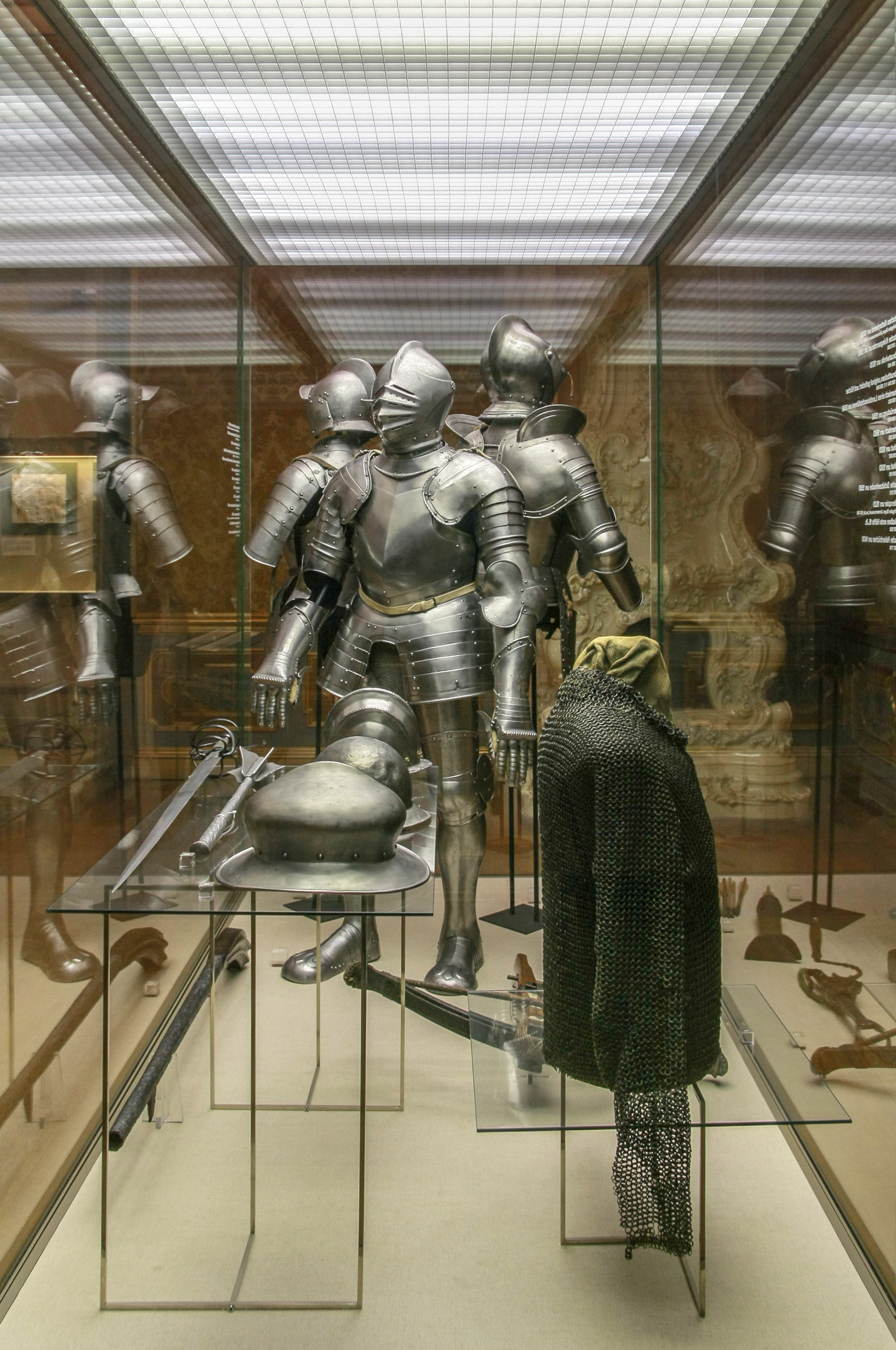
Medieval armor on display

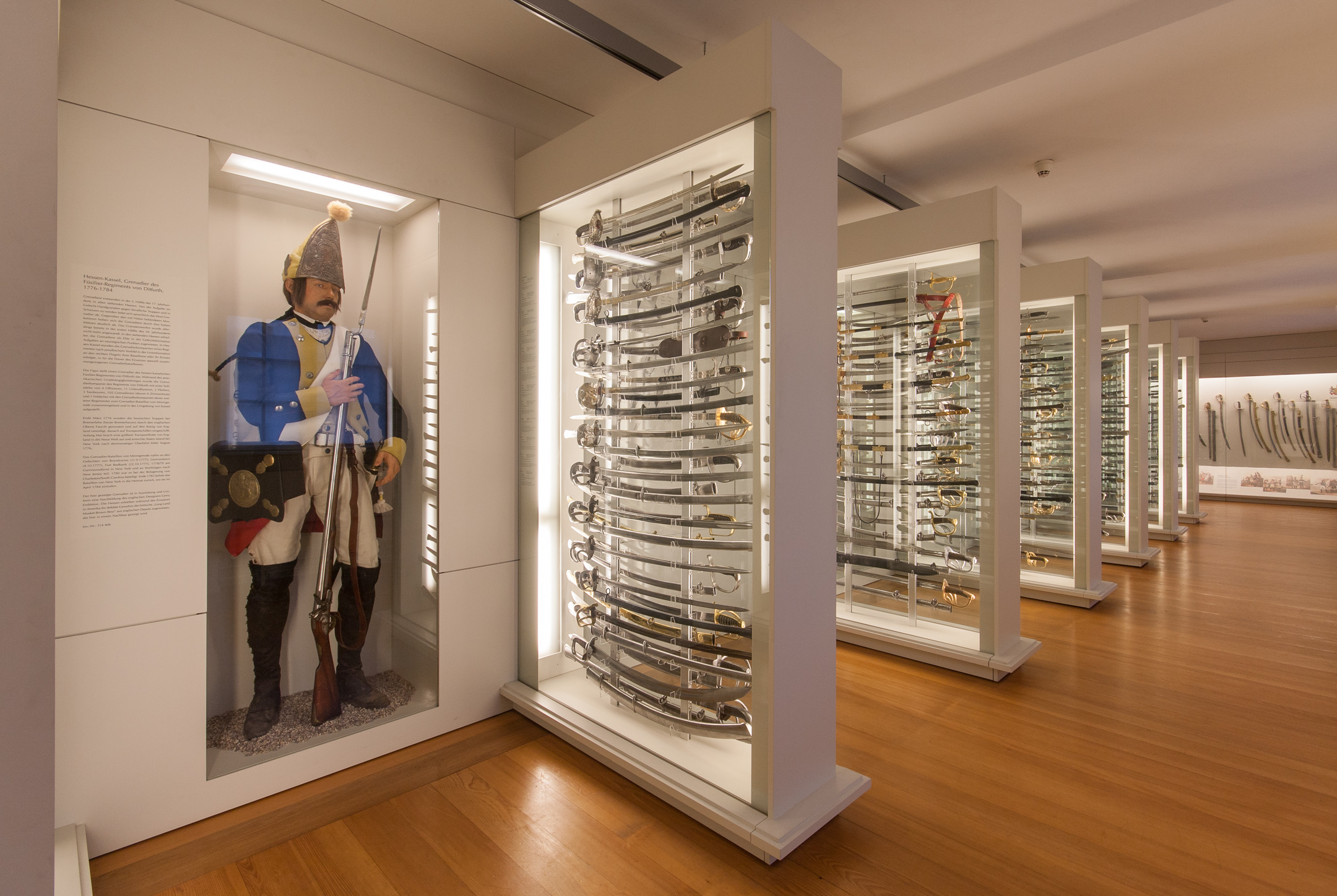
Collection of swords

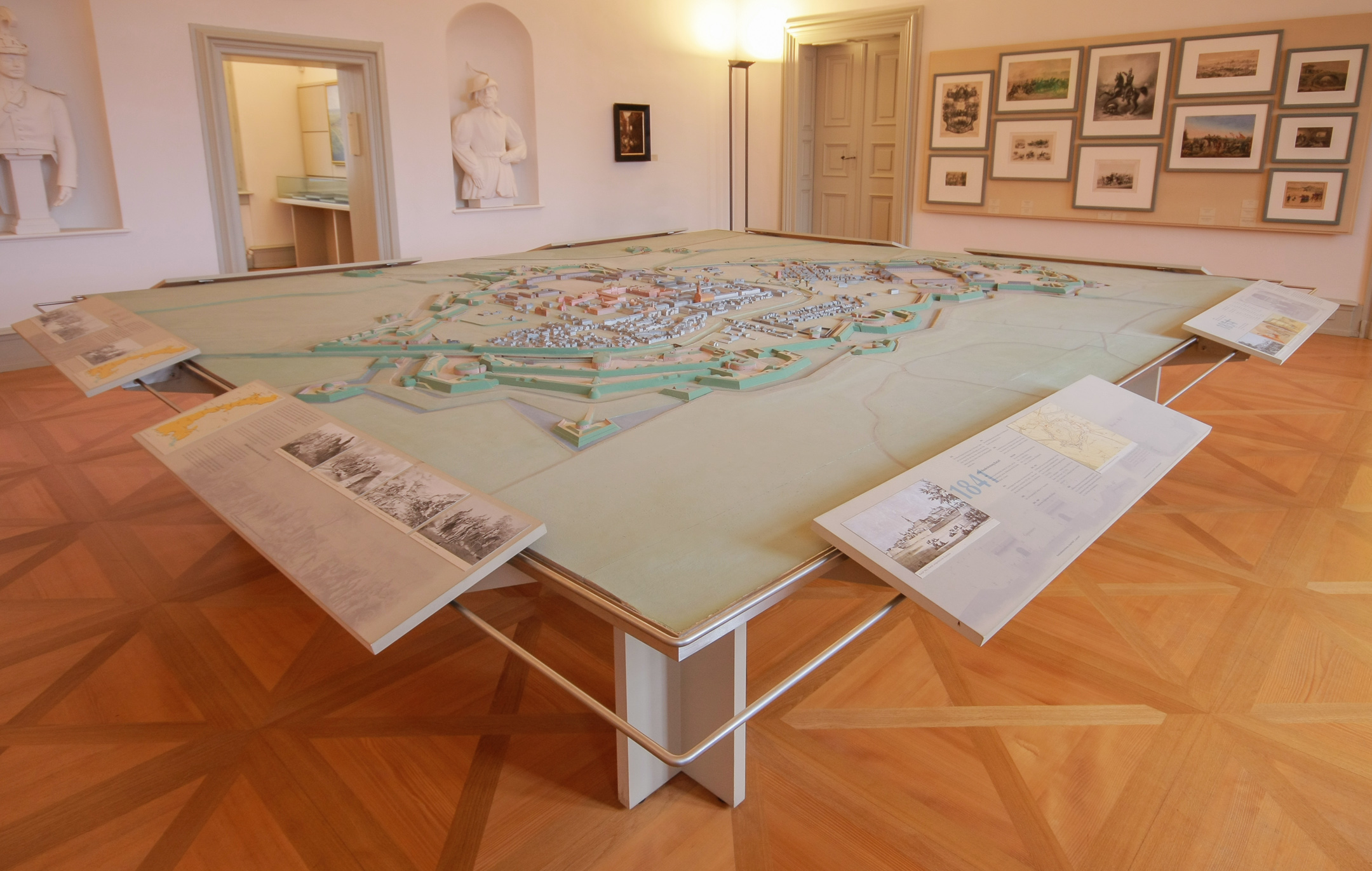
Relief model of the Rastatt Fortress

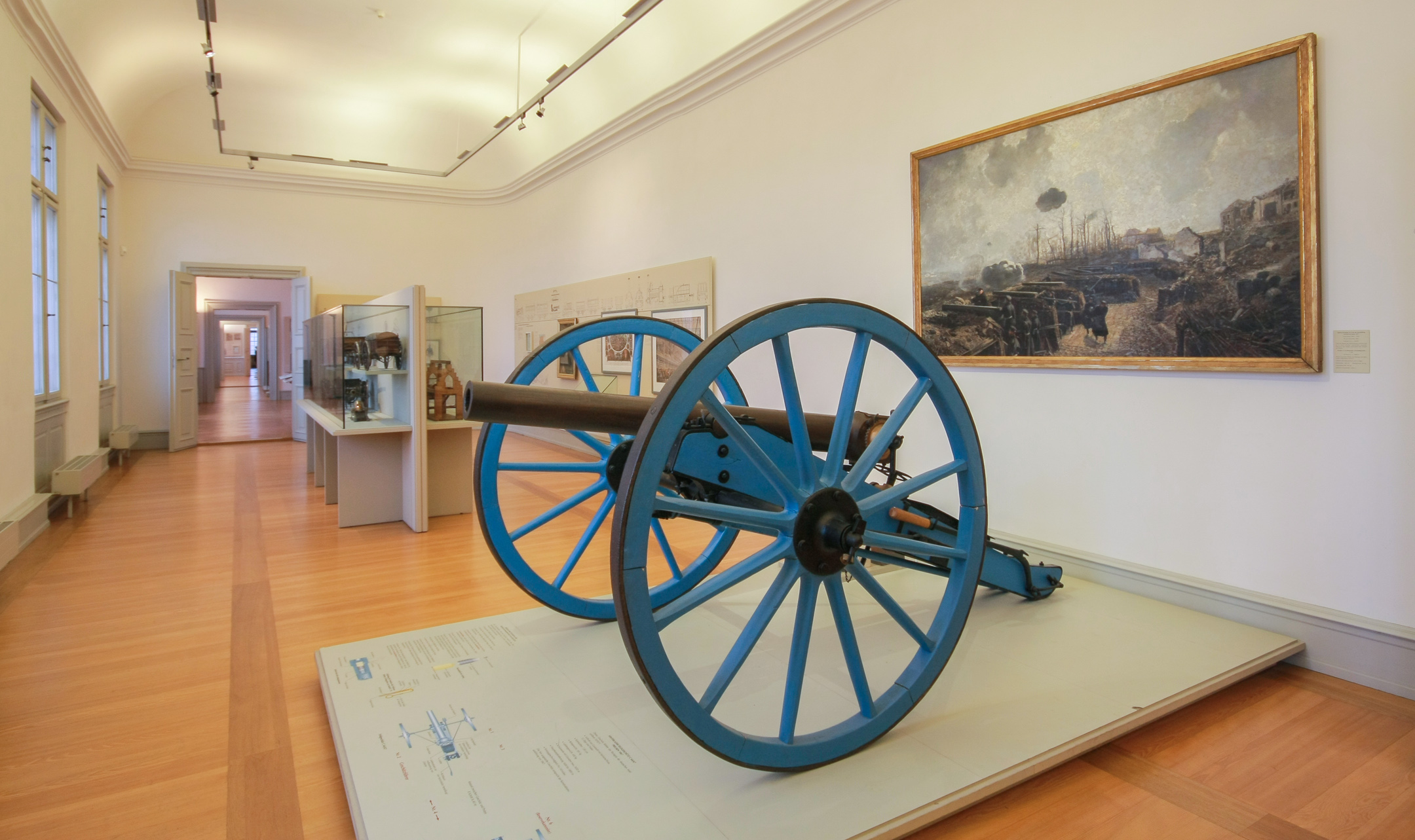
Artillery display
