= Christian Essig =

German footballer

Personal information
- Date of birth: January 24, 1986 (age 40)
- Place of birth: Rastatt, West Germany
- Height: 1.80 m (5 ft 11 in)
- Position: Right midfielder

Team information
- Current team: 1. FC Heidenheim (U17 assistant)

Youth career
- –2000: FC Rastatt
- 2000–2004: Karlsruher SC

Senior career*
Years	Team	Apps	(Gls)
2004–2007	Karlsruher SC II	38	(3)
2007–2008	SV Sandhausen	23	(1)
2008–2012	1. FC Heidenheim	79	(11)
2012–2013	SV Babelsberg 03	27	(4)
2013–2015	FV Illertissen	49	(8)
2015–2017	Normannia Gmünd	39	(11)
2017–2019	TSV Essingen	40	(10)
2021–2022	VfL Gerstetten		
Total		295	(48)

Managerial career
- 2019–: 1. FC Heidenheim (U17 assistant)
- * Club domestic league appearances and goals

Christian Essig (born January 24, 1986) is a retired German footballer.

== Career ==
=== Coaching career ===
In January 2019, Essig started his coaching career at his former club 1. FC Heidenheim, where he was appointed youth coach. As of the 2022-23 season, he was still in the same position.
