= Luise Adolpha Le Beau =

German composer (1850–1927)

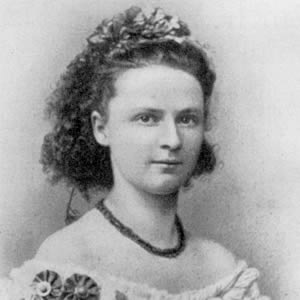
Luise Adolpha Le Beau (1872)

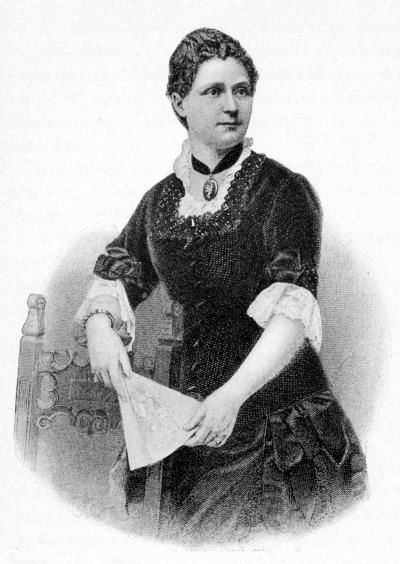
Luise Adolpha Le Beau

Luise Adolpha Le Beau (25 April 1850 in Rastatt, Grand Duchy of Baden – 17 July 1927 in Baden-Baden) was a German composer of classical music. She studied with noted musicians Clara Schumann and Franz Lachner, but her primary instructor was Josef Gabriel Rheinberger. Like many other 19th century female composers, Le Beau began her career in music as a pianist, and later earned her living teaching, critiquing, and performing music.

== Early life ==
Luise Adolpha Le Beau was born Luise Caroline Marie Henriette Adolpha Le Beau on 25 April 1850 in Rastatt, Grand Duchy of Baden. She was the only daughter of military officer Wilhelm Le Beau and his wife Karoline (née Barack). After William Le Beau's Baden army retirement in 1856, both parents devoted themselves to the general education of their daughter. From her father William, a musician and composer, Le Beau received piano lessons beginning at the age of five. Le Beau composed her first piece at the age of eight. She studied languages from 1863 through 1866 as a guest at the local girls' school. At age sixteen, she completed her education with a degree from a private institution for girls, and from then on devoted herself to music.

== Education ==
Following her confirmation on Easter of 1865, Le Beau began to take piano lessons from Hofkapellmeister William Kalliwoda in Karlsruhe. She also received singing lessons from Anton Haizinger. In 1868 she made her debut as a pianist, playing the E-flat major Concerto of Beethoven and the G minor Concerto by Felix Mendelssohn in Karlsruhe. In 1870, she met Franz Lachner and Anton Rubinstein. Le Beau applied for piano lessons with Clara Schumann in 1873 to be taken in Baden-Baden. Her studies with Schumann lasted for one summer, a total of twelve lessons, due to Schumann's teaching methods and personal differences between the two musicians. A concert engagement in February 1874 took Le Beau to five cities of The Netherlands. The tour began in Utrecht and led through Arnhem and Rotterdam to The Hague and, finally, to Amsterdam. Le Beau recounted in her memoir that her health was "unstable and unsuitable for touring."

== Career ==
=== Munich ===
With a letter of recommendation from the pianist and conductor Hans von Bülow, the Le Beau family decided to relocate to Munich to facilitate Luise studying under composer Josef Gabriel Rheinberger in 1876. Due to the regulations put in place by the Royal Music School, Le Beau was tutored separately from the male students. Rheinberger and Le Beau developed a close relationship, and Rheinberger dedicated his "Toccata for piano" op. 104 to Le Beau. While at the Royal Music School, Le Beau's teacher for counterpoint, harmony, and form was Ernst Melchior Sachse, and Franz Lachner offered critiques of many of her works.

The years following the relocation to Munich through 1885 became Le Beau's most productive period. In 1877, she undertook a concert tour with singer Aglaia Orgeni and violinist Bartha Haft. They went to several Bavarian towns, where Luise performed her original compositions. Le Beau also worked as a critic, writing reviews for "Allgemeine Deutsche Musik-Zeitung" in Berlin beginning in 1878. Le Beau eventually stopped critiquing music when her editor consistently amended and shortened her articles. In 1878, she also founded her "private music course for daughters of the educated classes." These lessons were aimed at preparing women for job opportunities as piano teachers.

Le Beau focused more on other composers (including Berlioz, Wagner, Chopin, Schumann) and gradually cut herself off from Rheinberger, which led to the termination of the teaching relationship in 1880. In the summer of 1882, she wrote the score of "Op.27, Ruth - Biblical Scenes for Soloists, Chorus, and Orchestra." Christian Friedrich Kahnt from Leipzig published the piece, and it was premiered on 5 March 1883 in Munich. Also during 1882, she won the first prize for her "Cello Sonata op.17" in an international composition contest. In the same year, Le Beau met Franz Liszt in Weimar. She was quite disappointed by her encounter with Liszt as it did not assist her with acquiring contacts, nor did her piano skills develop any further. Le Beau's "Quartet Op.28 for Piano, Violin, Viola and Cello" was premiered at the Gewandhaus in Leipzig. In 1884, she met the writer Luise Hitz and set some of her poems to music. Throughout the same year, she travelled to Salzburg and Vienna, where she made the acquaintance of Eduard Hanslick and Johannes Brahms.

=== Berlin ===
Due to the increasing frailty of the Le Beau elders and Luise's struggle to find musicians in Munich to work with, the family relocated to Wiesbaden in 1885. Le Beau had some of her pieces performed in Wiesbaden, where she also taught music theory and offered vocal lessons. In Wiesbaden, Le Beau began her pieces Hadumoth, Op.40 and Op. 37, Piano Concerto. Le Beau's pieces began to be performed outside of Europe, reaching both Sydney and Constantinople.

In 1890, the family was forced to move to Berlin. Le Beau began to study music history at the Royal Library. She later entrusted her music to the Royal Library for preservation. In Berlin, she came in contact with other musicians including Woldemar Bargiel, Joseph Joachim, and Philipp Spitta. During this time, Le Beau only tutored a few students so that she could focus on composing and duplicating the score for "Hadumoth." Georg Vierling, a member of Berlin's Royal Academy of Arts nominated Le Beau for a chair position at the Royal School of Music. Ultimately, Le Beau was not granted the position, as it was never assigned to women.

=== Baden-Baden ===
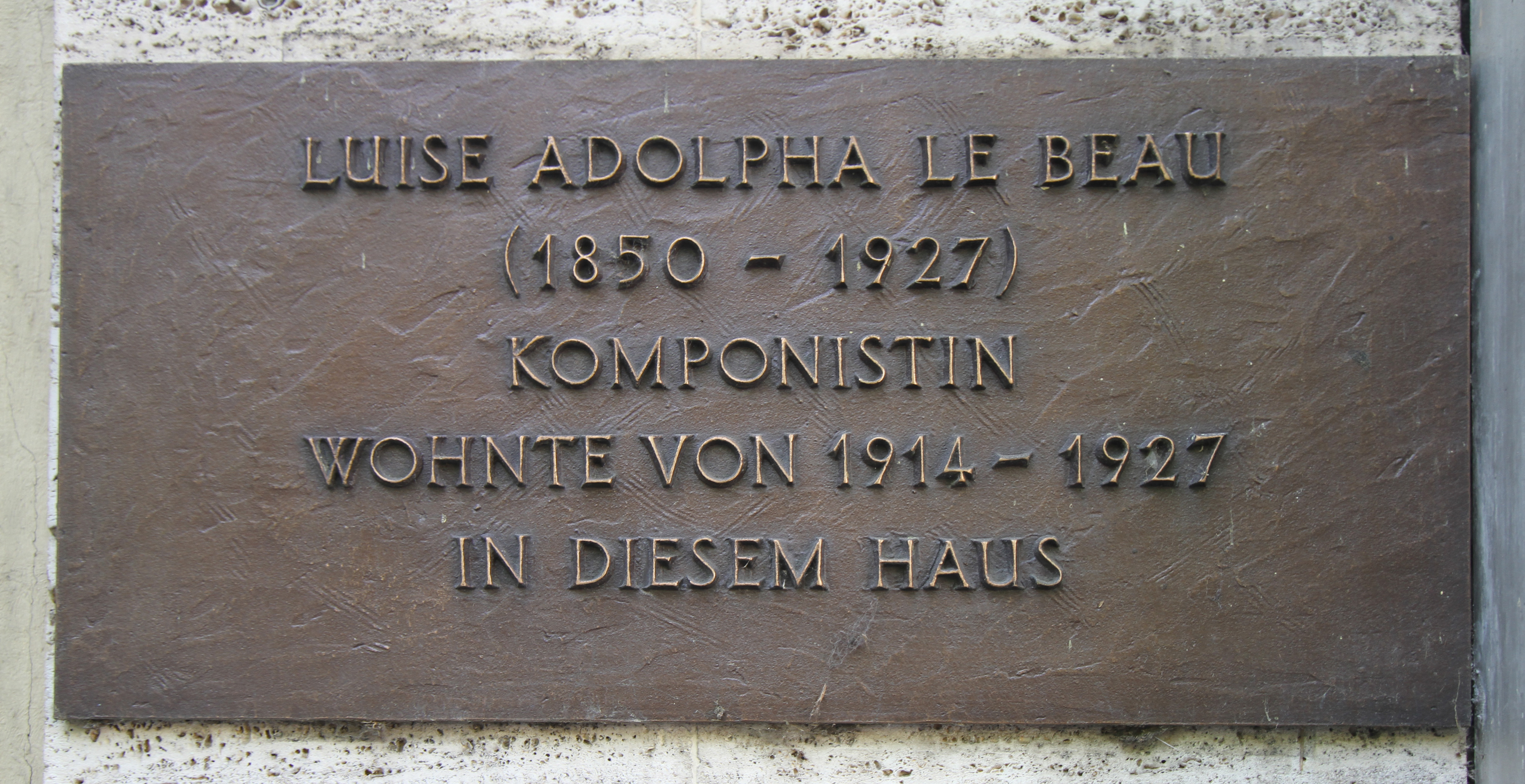
Memorial plaque for Luise Adolpha Le Beau in Baden-Baden, Lichtentaler Straße 46

Le Beau and her family moved again in 1893, settling down in Baden-Baden. On November 19 of 1893, "Hadumoth, Op. 40" premiered. Over the next few years, she wrote several more works, including "Symphony Op.41 for Orchestra" which premiered in 1895 in Baden-Baden. After a stroke, William Le Beau died in 1896, leaving Luise to be the sole caregiver for her mother, who had become nearly blind. In the summer of 1897, Le Beau finished her work on the score of the symphonic poem "Hohenbaden," which premiered on 25 February 1898 in Baden-Baden. In 1900, her mother died. The last major chamber work of Luise Adolpha Le Beau, "String Quintet, Op.54 for 2 violins, viola and two cellos" was listed in 1901, but was not published. In 1902, Le Beau composed the fairy-tale opera "The Enchanted Caliph, Op.55," which she dedicated to her parents. Other compositions (Op.56 to Op.65) followed in Baden-Baden over the following years.

== Later life ==
On a trip to Rome in 1902, Le Beau met the singer Alfredo de'Giorgio. In 1903, 24 years prior to her death, she withdrew from her musical career. From 1906 to 1910, she lived in Italy. In 1910, Le Beau published her autobiography, Lebenserinnerungen einer Komponistin (Memoirs of a Female Composer). The memoirs included retellings of her concerts and her experiences and interactions with both male and female colleagues – her personal life, including her composition process and inspirations, was mentioned very briefly. Throughout her memoir, she refers back to her diaries in order to assist with the proper retelling of the stories. However, the diaries do not appear to have been preserved.

Her last years were marked by travel, teaching, composing, giving concerts, and writing music reviews for the Baden-Baden newspaper. In this period, Le Beau began to give concerts in Baden-Baden. She also wrote an article about the music in Baden-Baden for Badeblatt following World War I. In 1922, the father of one of her former students offered her a pension for the duration of her life. On her 75th birthday, Le Beau gave a concert of her piano compositions.

On 17 July 1927 Luise Adolpha Le Beau died at the age of 77 years in Baden-Baden. She was buried next to her parents at the city cemetery. In memory of the musician, the city of Baden-Baden has named their music library after her, and on 23 July 2004 a memorial plaque was installed at Lichtenaler Straße 46, the building in which she lived and subsequently died.

== Sources ==
- Annika Forkert: Artikel "Luise Adolpha Le Beau", in: Musikvermittlung und Genderforschung: Lexikon und multimediale Präsentationen, hg. von Beatrix Borchard, Hochschule für Musik und Theater Hamburg, 2003ff. 19 April 2010. (retrieved 25 September 2020).
- Judith E. Olson: Art. Le Beau, Luise Adolpha. Grove Music Online (2005)
- Judith E. Olson: "Luise Adolpha Le Beau: Composer in Late Nineteenth-Century Germany." In: Jane Bowers, Judith Tick (ed.), Women Making Music. The Western Art Tradition, 1150–1950, Urbana/Chicago 1987, 282–303.
- Judith E. Olson: "Le Beau, Luise Adolpha." In: The New Grove Dictionary of Women Composers. Julie Anne Sadie, Rhian Samuel (ed.), London 1994. S. 269–271.
