= Schloss Rastatt =

Baroque schloss in Rastatt, Germany

Coordinates: 48°51′32″N 08°12′20″E

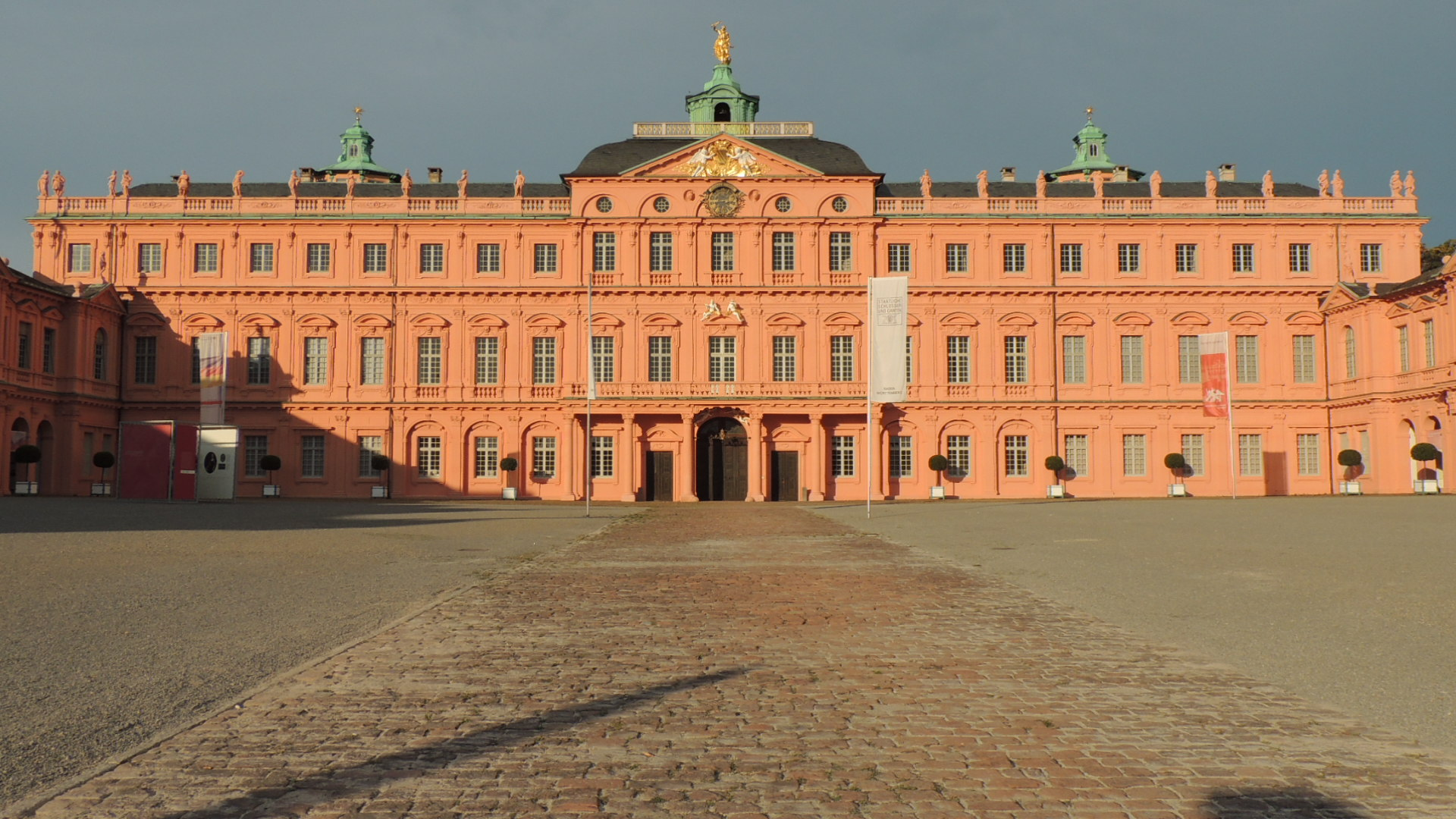
Schloss Rastatt in 2012

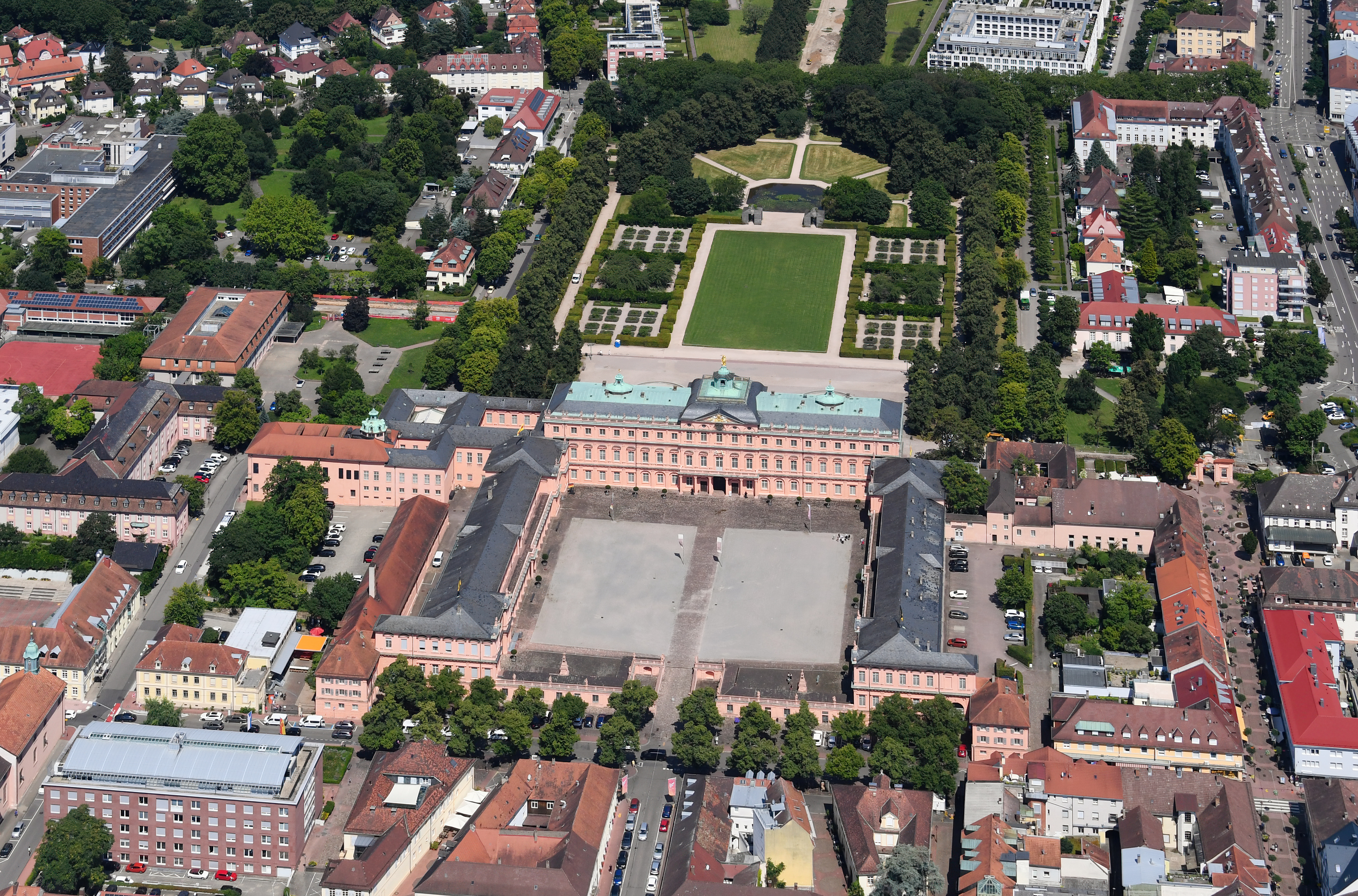
Aerial view of Schloss Rastatt

Schloss Rastatt, also known as Residenzschloss Rastatt, is a Baroque schloss in Rastatt, Germany. The palace and the garden were built between 1700 and 1707 by the Italian architect Domenico Egidio Rossi for Margrave Louis William of Baden-Baden. Visitors can tour the restored Baroque interior and gardens.

== History ==
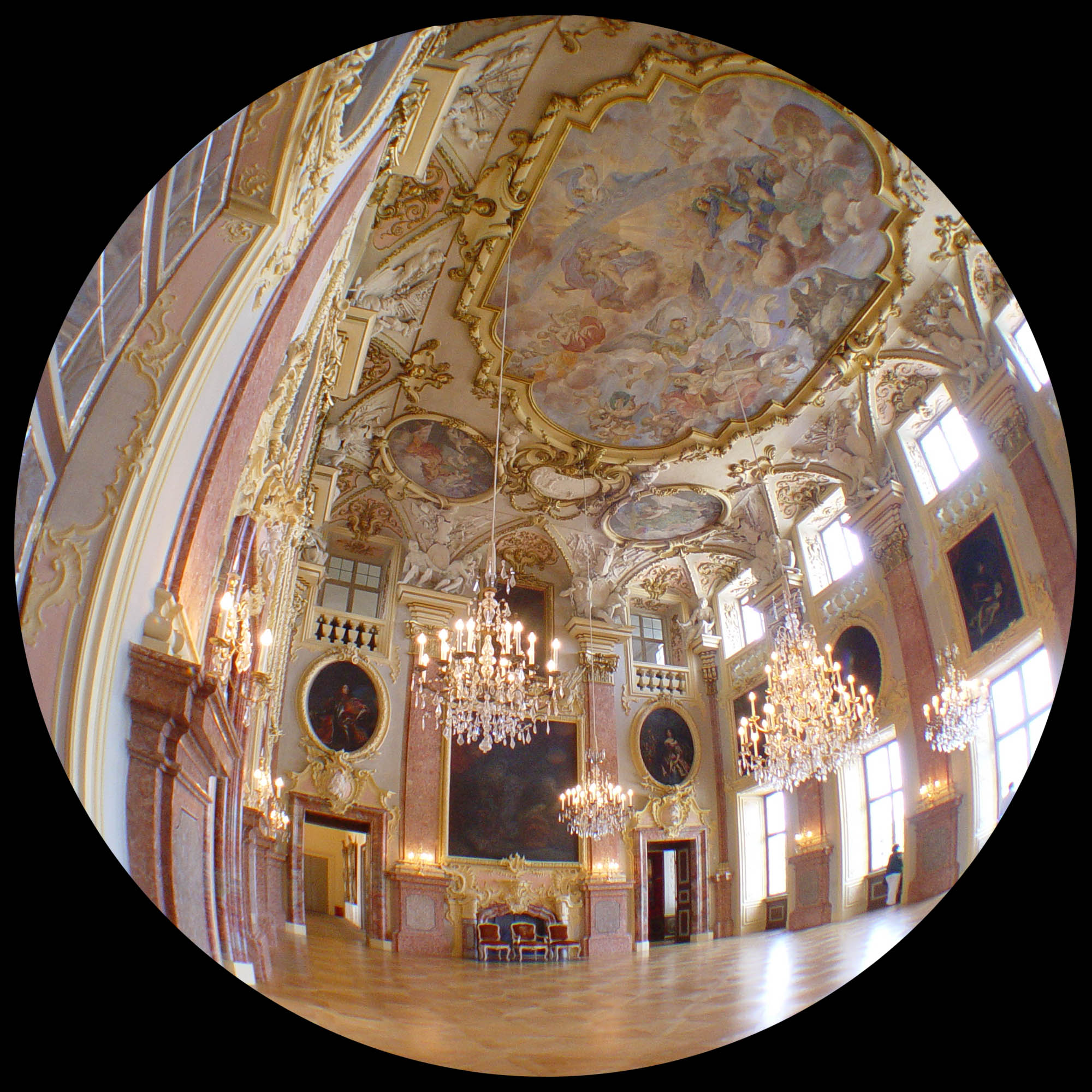
The Prunksaal in 2005

During the Palatine war of succession, the residence of Margrave Louis William of Baden-Baden had been burnt by French troops. A rebuild of the destroyed building would not have suited the representative needs of the court of Baden-Baden. Since he also needed a home for his wife Sibylle Auguste of Saxe-Lauenburg, whom he had married in 1690, the Margrave had a new residence built in place of the former hunting lodge.

During this operation, the 1697 hunting lodge was demolished to leave space for the new palace. The village of Rastatt was promoted to city status in 1700, and the Margrave moved there with his court.

The residence in Rastatt is the oldest Baroque residence in the German Upper-Rhine area. It was built according to the example of the French Palace of Versailles. During the 19th century, the palace was used as a headquarters.

The palace was not damaged during World War II. It is now owned by the State of Baden-Württemberg, and visitors can take guided tours of the restored rooms and Baroque gardens.

The palace is also home to two museums, the "Wehrgeschichtliches Museum" (military history museum) and the "Erinnerungsstätte für die Freiheitsbewegungen in der deutschen Geschichte" (memorial site for the German liberation movement).

== Interior ==
A large staircase with stucco decorations gives way to the bel étage. The biggest and most decorated hall is the Ahnensaal ("Ancestral Hall"). It is decorated with numerous frescoes and shows paintings of ancestors and of captured Ottoman soldiers.

== See also ==
- List of Baroque residences
- List of castles in Germany
- Schloss Favorite (Rastatt)
