= Schloss Favorite (Rastatt) =

Schloss in Baden-Württemberg, Germany

Coordinates: 48°49′20″N 08°14′24″E

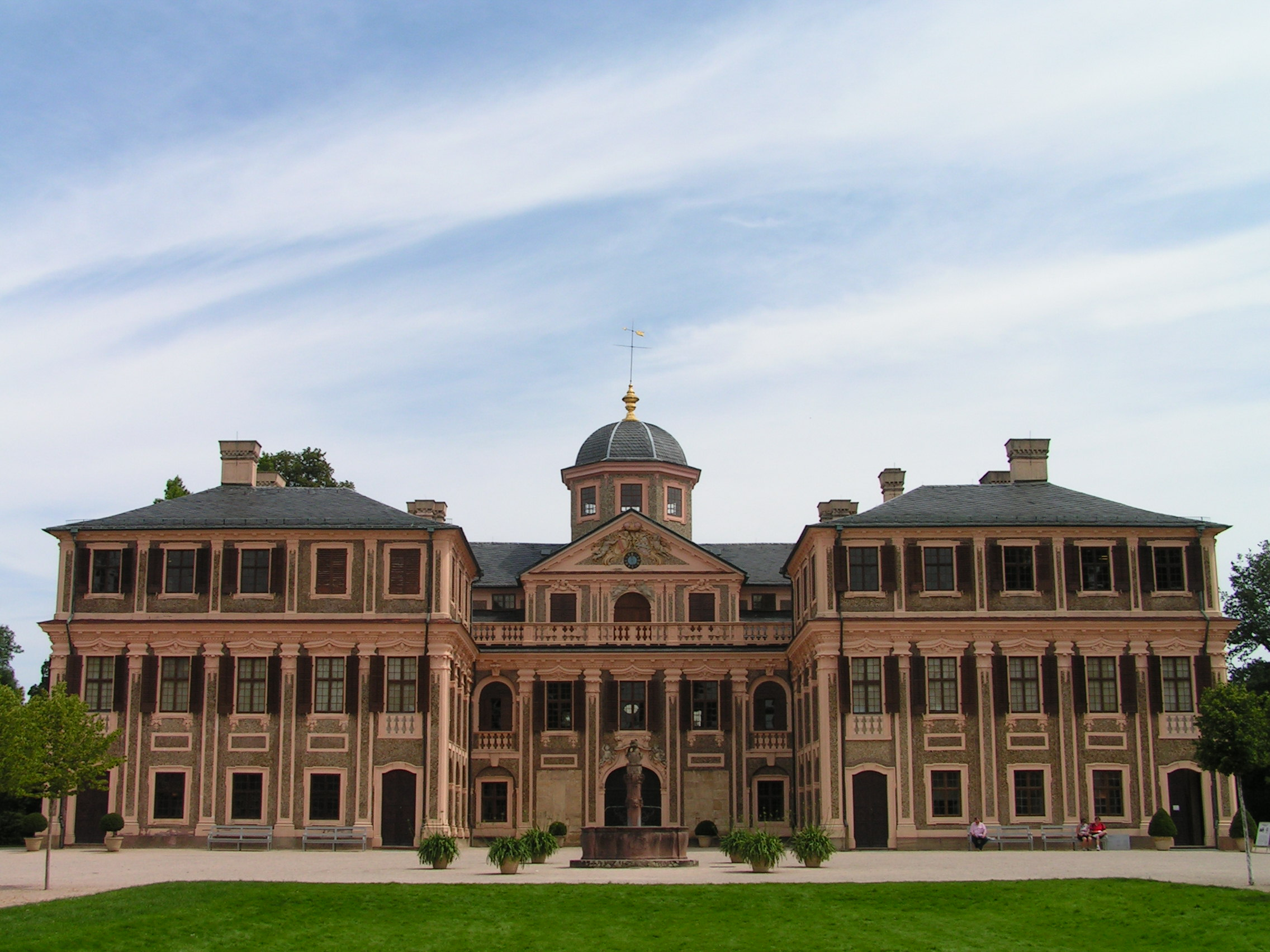
Schloss Favorite, front view

Schloss Favorite is a schloss on the outskirts of Rastatt-Förch in Baden-Württemberg, Germany.

== History ==
Built by Johann Michael Ludwig Rohrer between 1710 and 1730, it was created as a hunting lodge and maison de plaisance (pleasure palace) for Margravine Sibylla Augusta, the widow of Louis William, Margrave of Baden-Baden (Türkenlouis). It was only used for several weeks per year as a summer residence, and it is not far from Schloss Rastatt.

Schloss Favorite houses a large collection of Chinese porcelain, black lacquerwork and Schwartz Porcelain. It is the oldest of the German so-called "porcelain palaces", and the only one to survive intact to this day.

== Gallery ==
Schloss Favorite

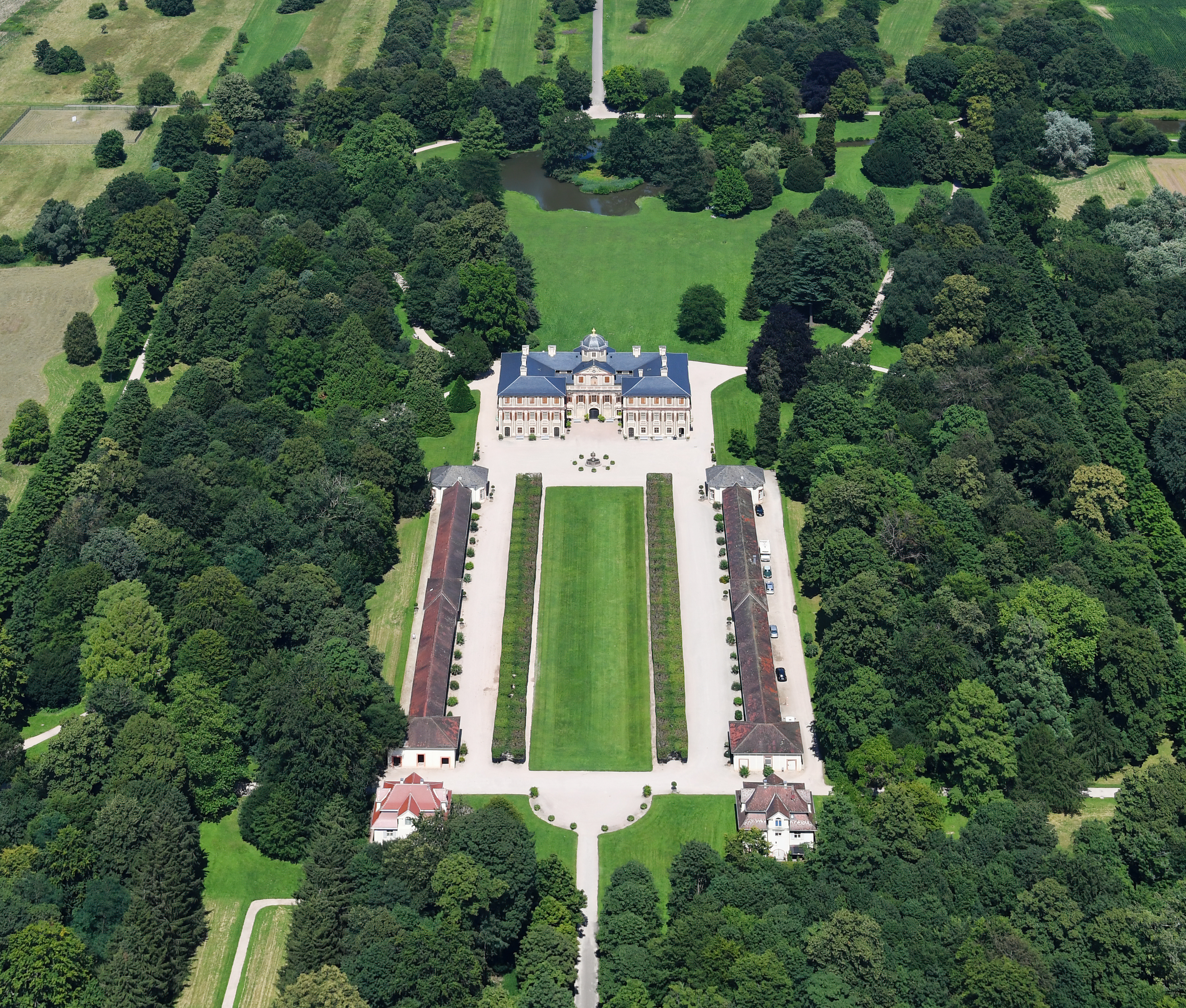
Aerial view of Schloss Favorite and its garden

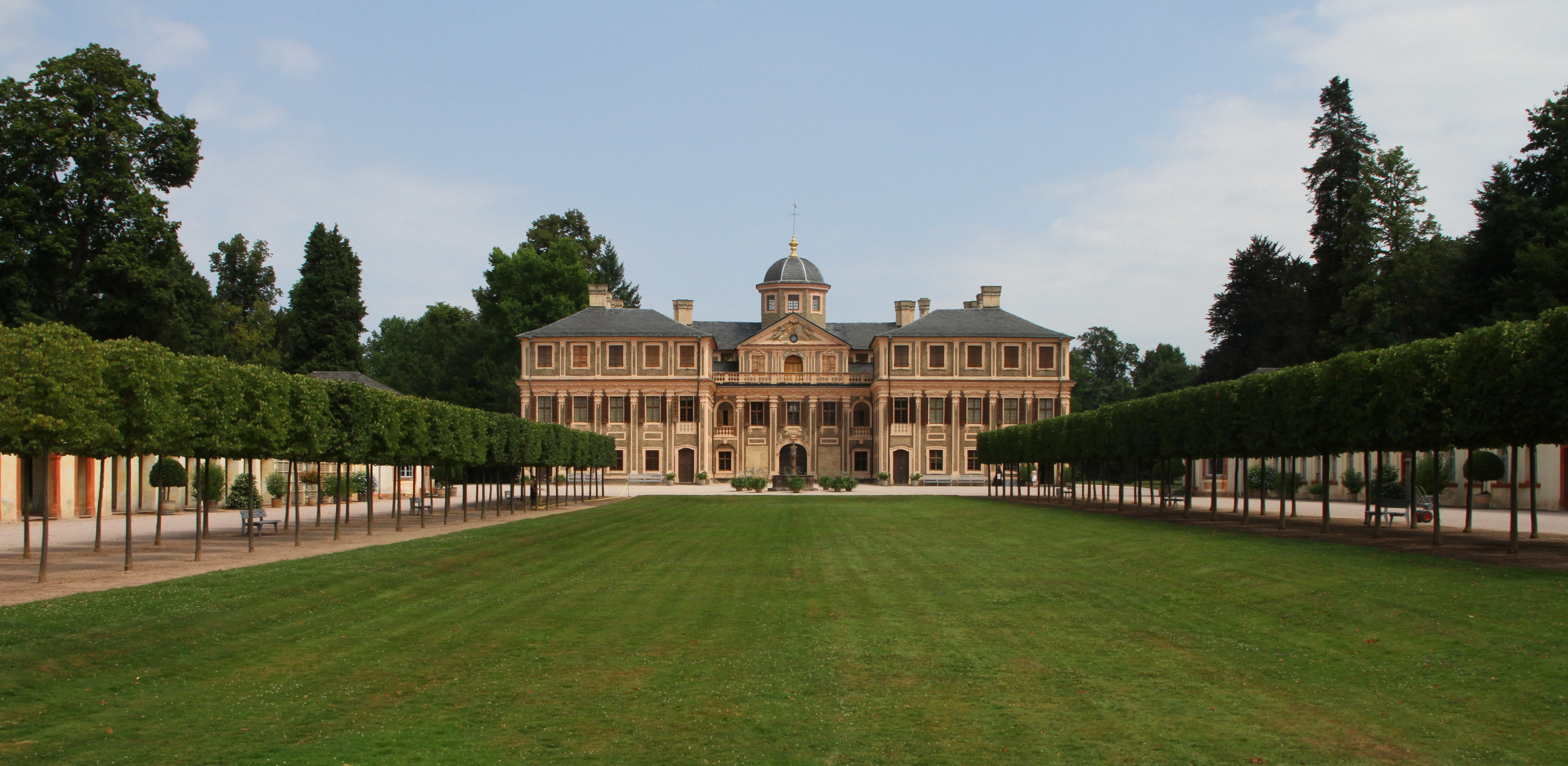
Remote front view

Close-up of coats of arms (left: Baden-Baden, right: Saxe-Lauenburg) and pebble dash used on walls

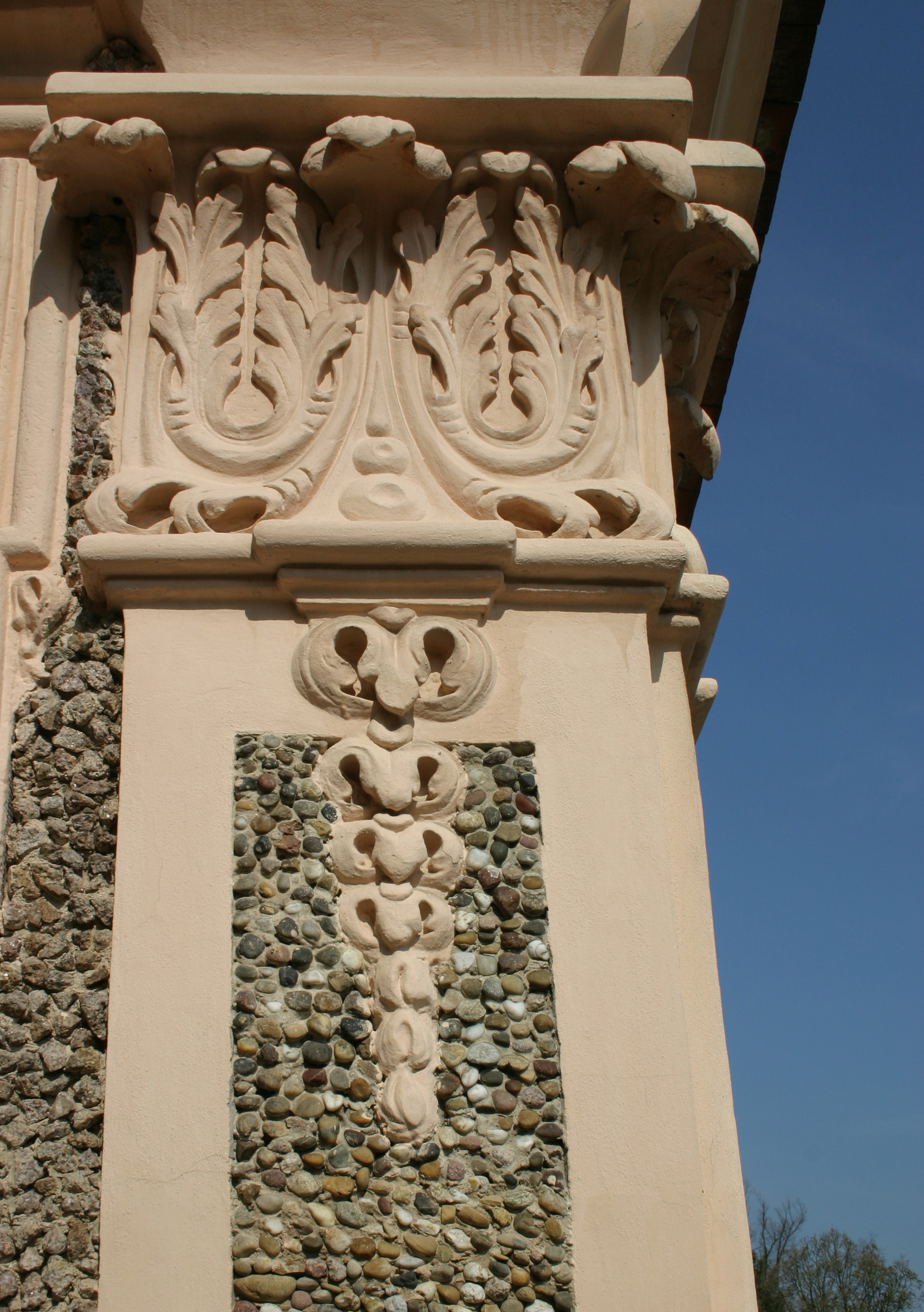
Pebbledash

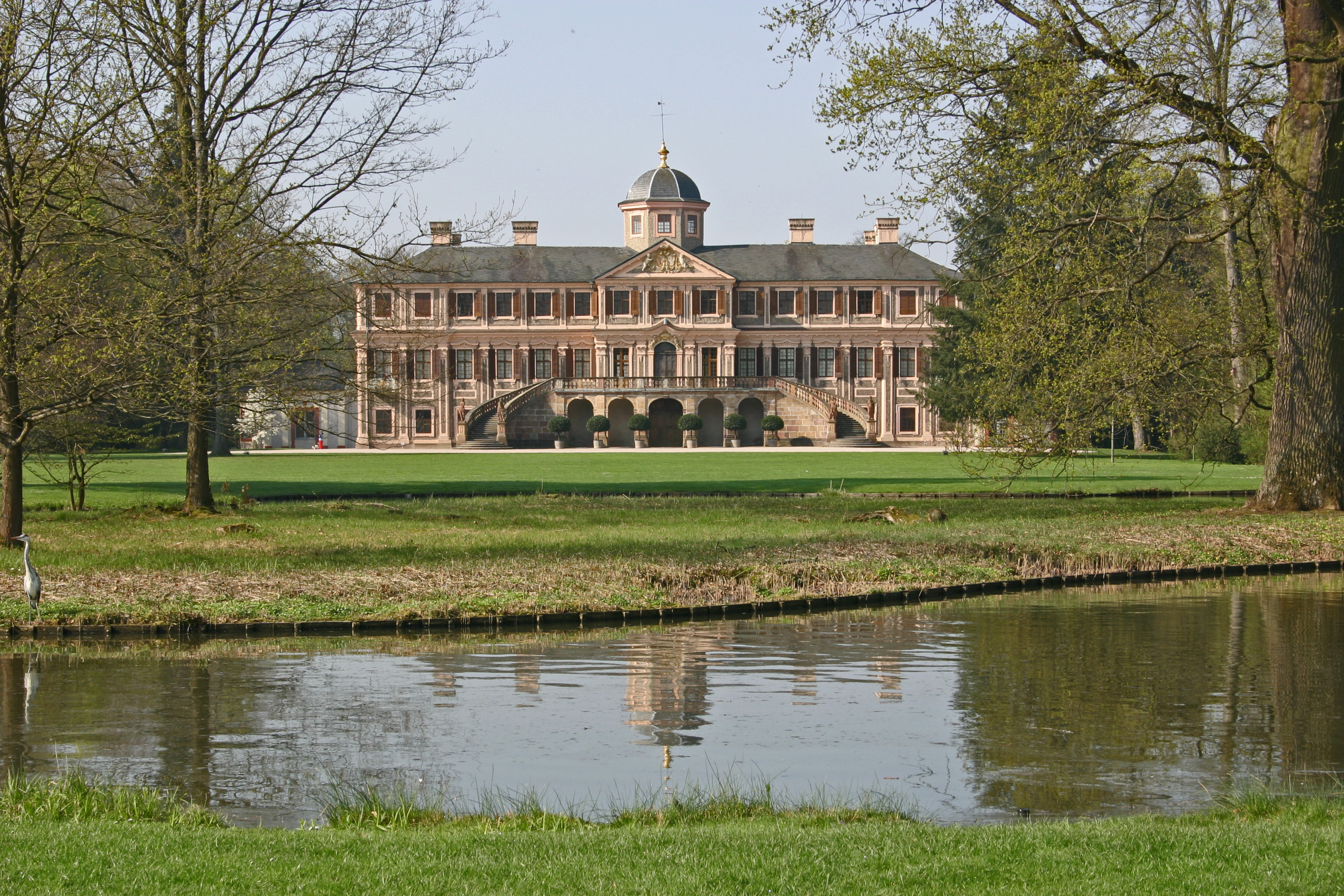
Rear view

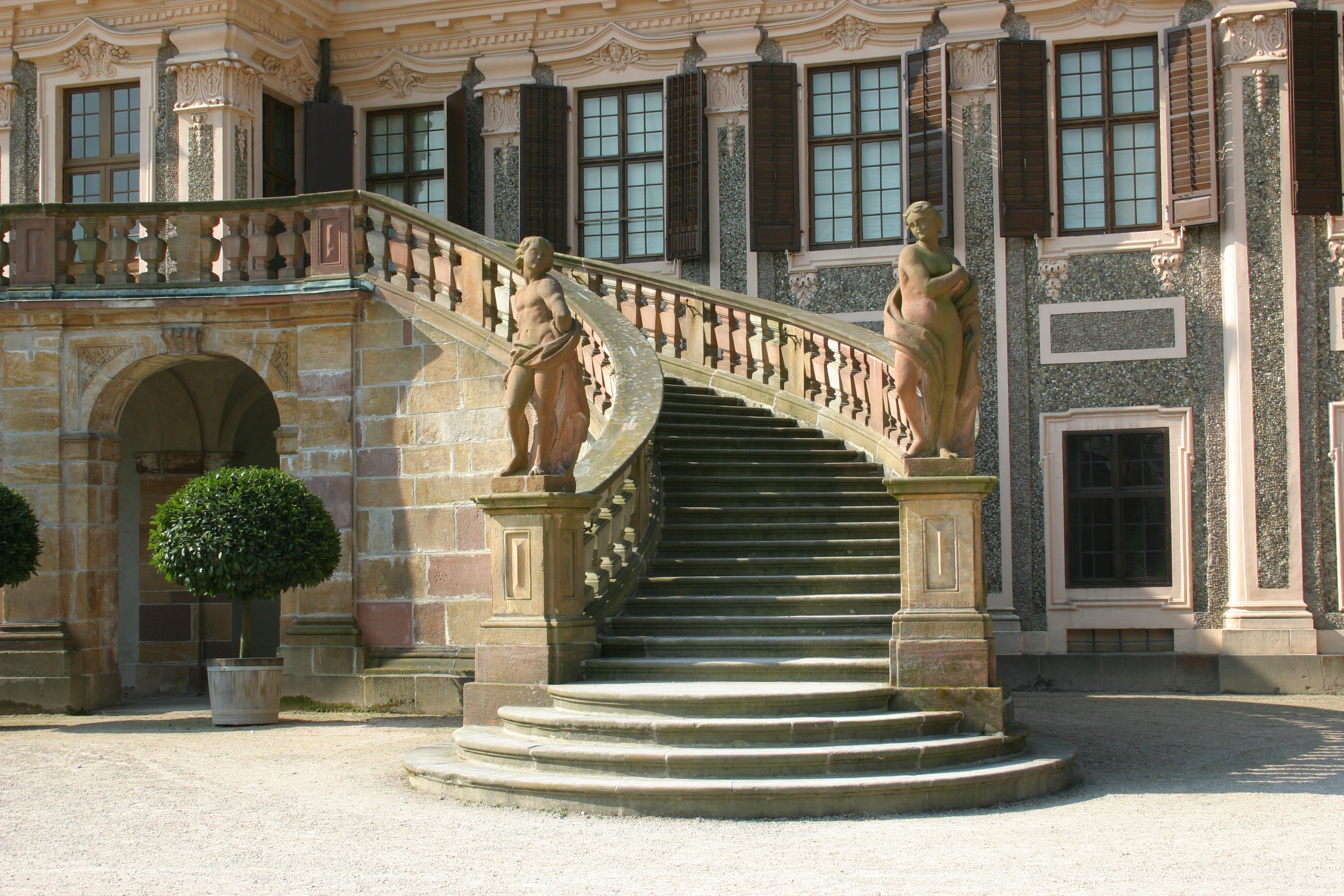
Open staircase on rear front

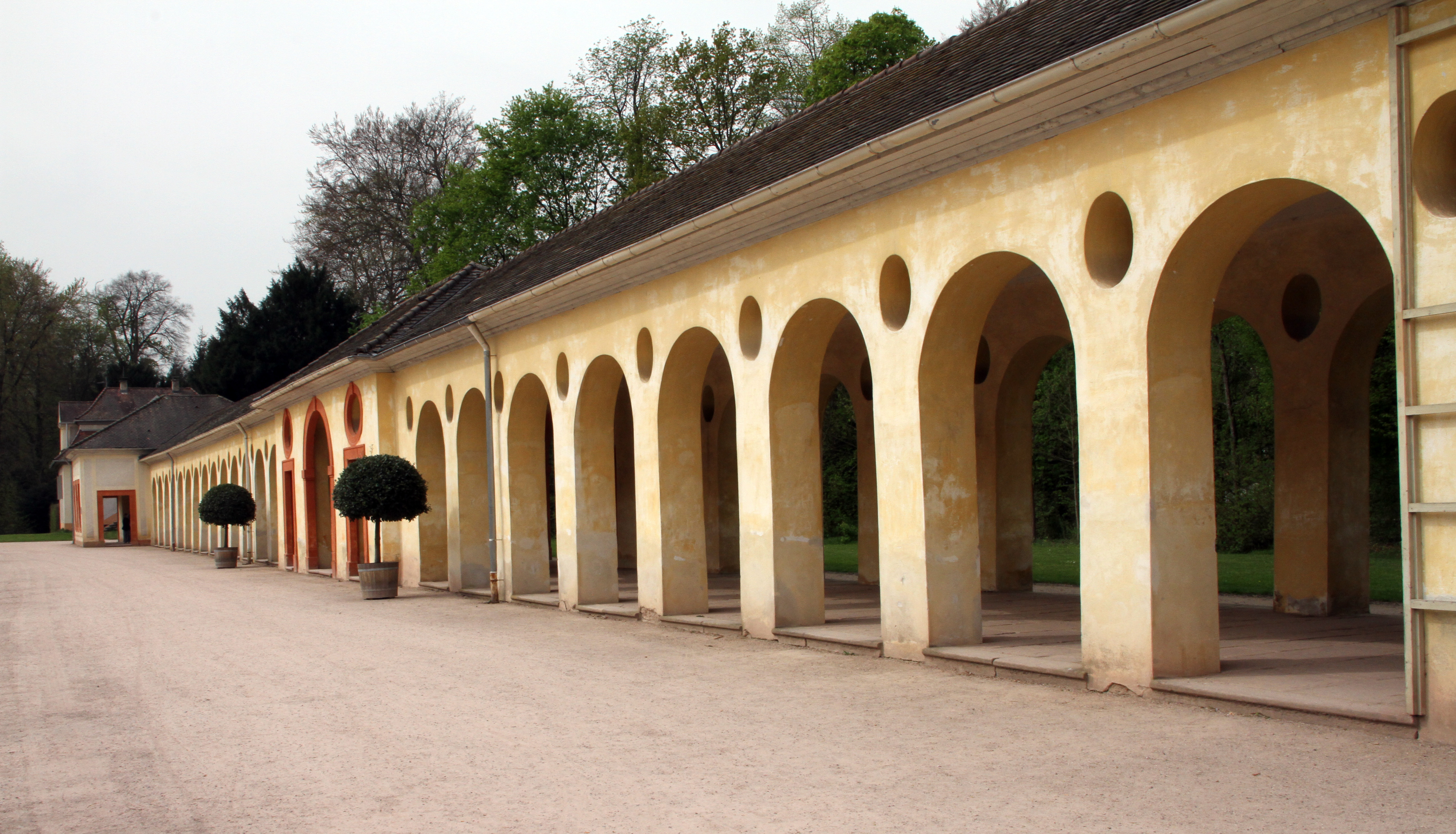
Orangerie

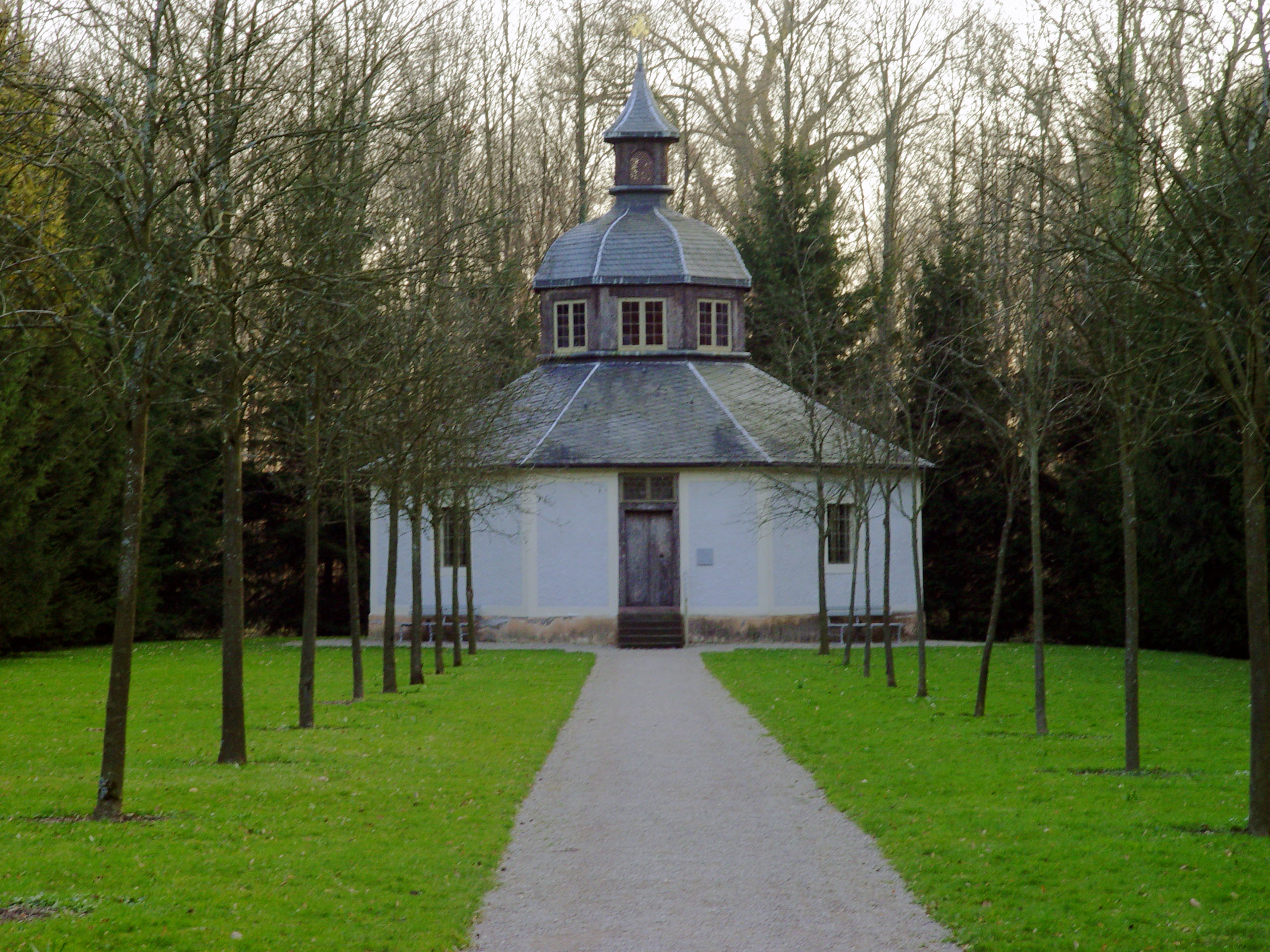
Hermitage

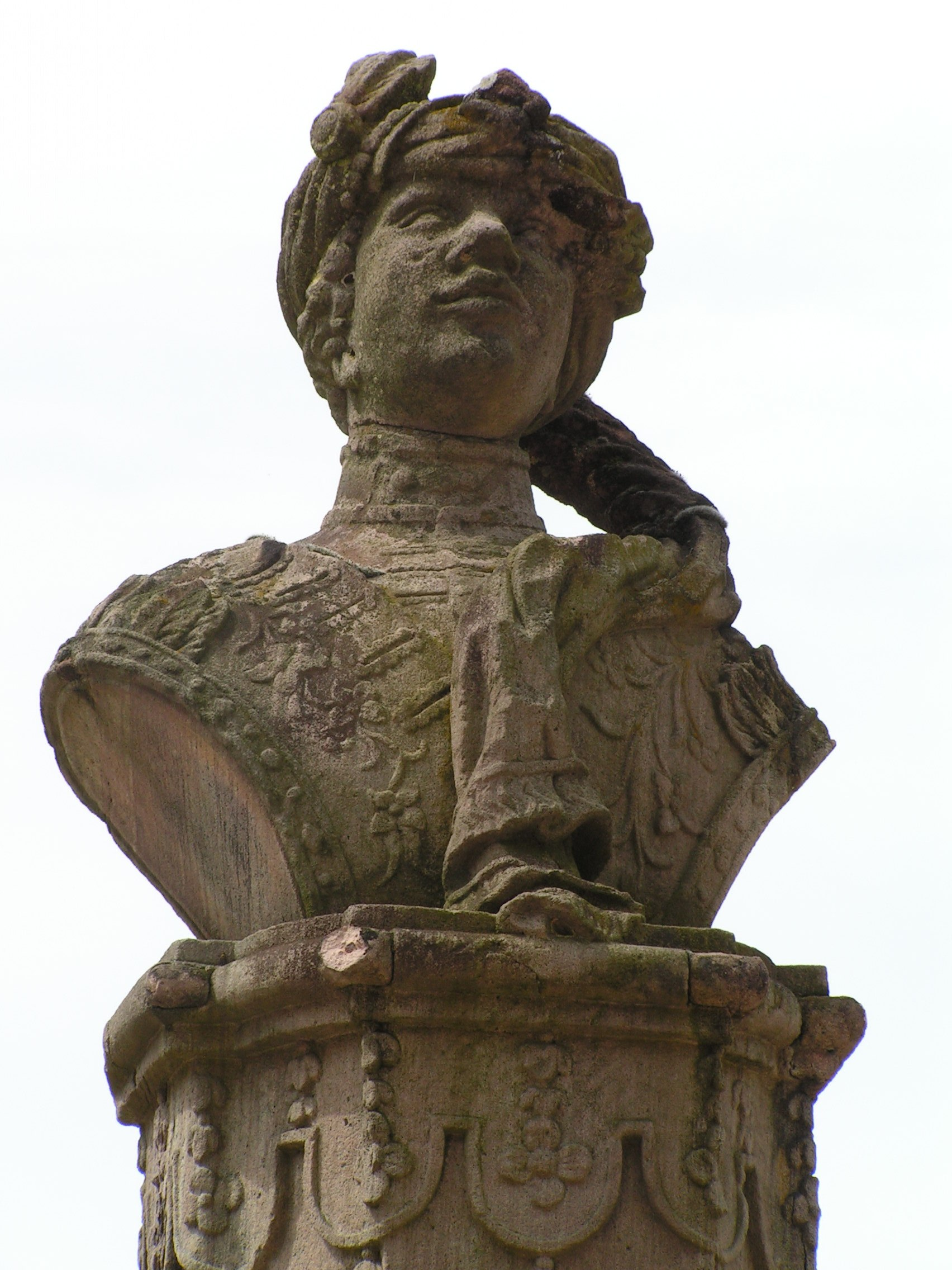
Louis William, Margrave of Baden-Baden, also known as Türkenlouis

== See also ==
- List of Baroque residences

== Sources ==
- Sigrid Gensichen/Ulrike Grimm, Schloss Favorite Rastatt-Förch. Verlag K. F. Schimper, 2001, ISBN 3-87742-168-7
