= Rastatt =

- Town
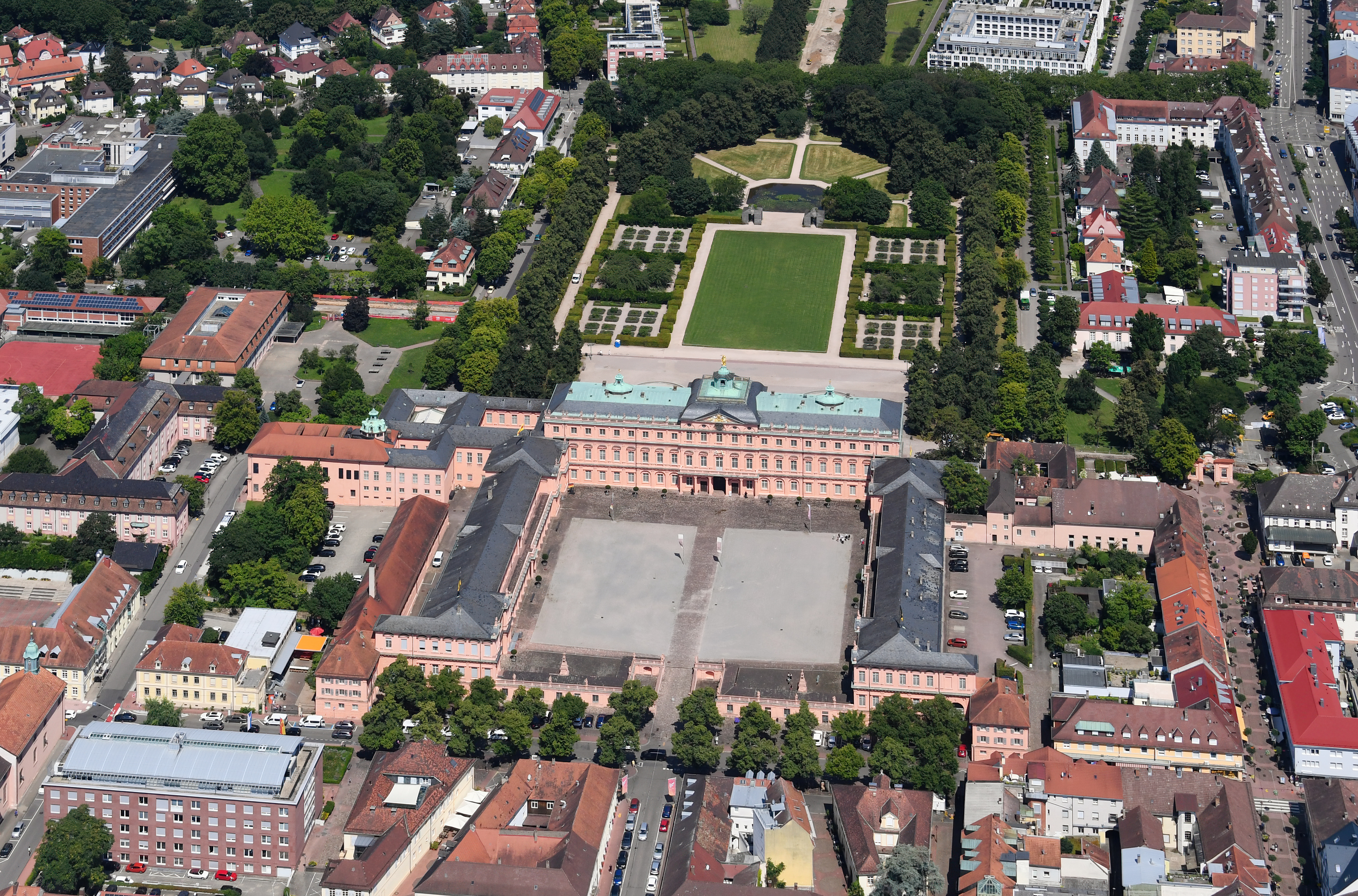

- Coat of arms

- Location of Rastatt within Rastatt district
- Interactive map of Rastatt
- Location within Germany Location within Baden-Württemberg
- Coordinates: 48°51′N 8°12′E
- Country: Germany
- State: Baden-Württemberg
- Admin. region: Karlsruhe
- District: Rastatt

Government
  - Mayor (2023–31): Monika Müller (SPD)

Area
  - Total: 58.98 km^{2} (22.77 sq mi)
- Elevation: 115 m (377 ft)

Population (2025-12-31)
  - Total: 50,753
  - Density: 860.5/km^{2} (2,229/sq mi)
- Time zone: UTC+01:00 (CET)
  - Summer (DST): UTC+02:00 (CEST)
- Postal codes: 76401-76437
- Dialling codes: 07222, 07229
- Vehicle registration: RA
- Website: rastatt.de

Rastatt (German pronunciation: [ˈʁaʃtat]) is a town in the district of Rastatt, Baden-Württemberg, Germany. It is located in the Upper Rhine Plain, on the Murg River, 6 km (3.7 mi) above its junction with the Rhine. It has a Baroque core and a population of around 51,000 (2022). Rastatt was an important place during the War of the Spanish Succession (Treaty of Rastatt) and the Revolutions of 1848 in the German states.

== History ==
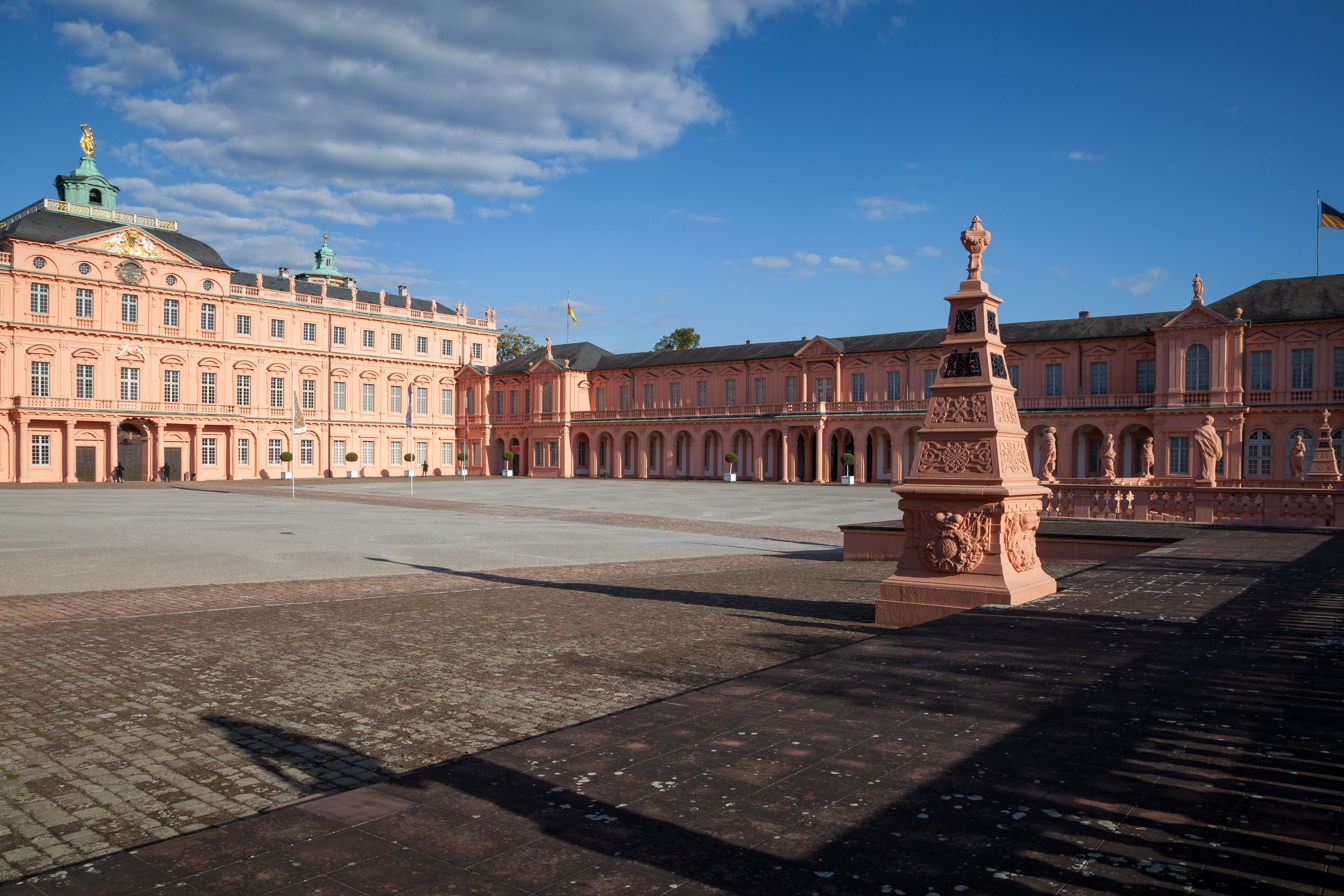
Schloss Rastatt

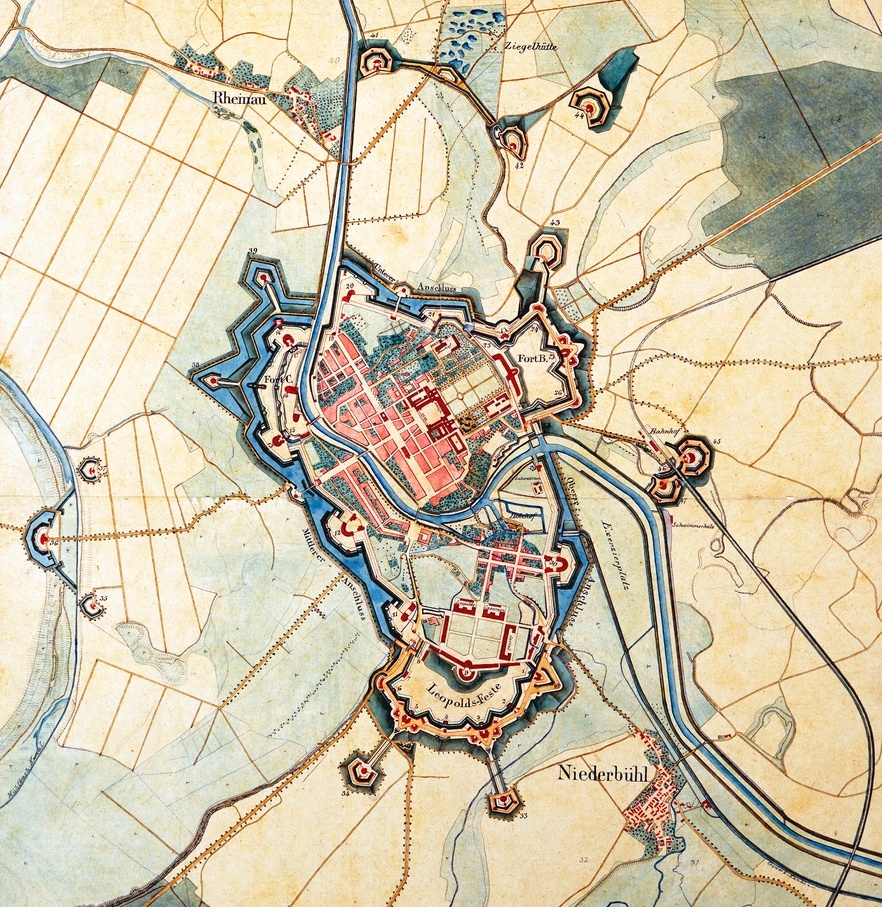
The fortress of Rastatt in 1849

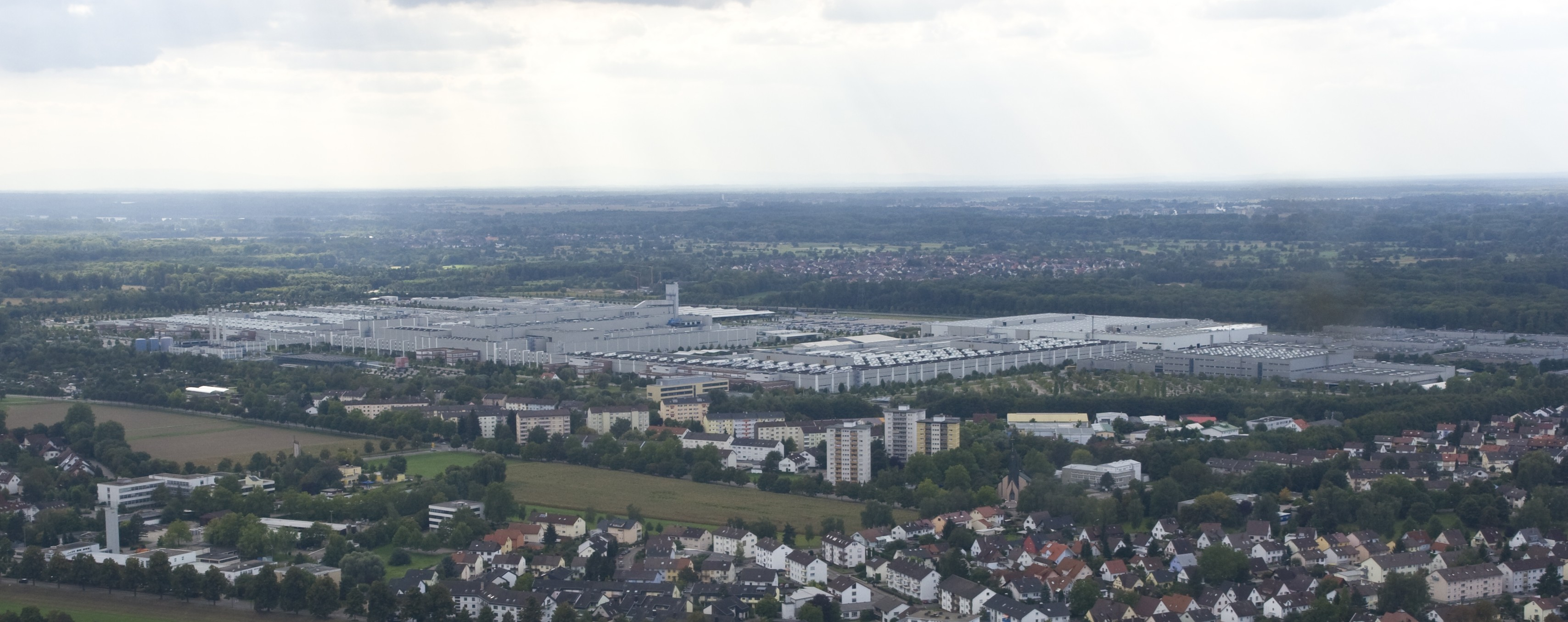
Mercedes-Benz factory in Rastatt

Until the end of the 17th century, Rastatt held little influence, but after its destruction by the French in 1689, it was rebuilt on a larger scale by Louis William, Margrave of Baden, the Imperial General in the Great Turkish War who was known popularly as Türkenlouis.

It then remained the residence of the Margraves of Baden-Baden until 1771. It was the location of the First and Second Congress of Rastatt, the former giving rise to the Treaty of Rastatt while the second ended in failure in 1799. In the 1840s, Rastatt was surrounded by fortifications to form the Fortress of Rastatt. For about 20 years previous to 1866, it was occupied by the troops of the German Confederation.

The Baden Revolution of 1849 began with a mutiny of soldiers at Rastatt in May 1849 under Ludwik Mieroslawski and Gustav Struve and ended there a few weeks later with the capture of the town by Prussia. (See The Revolutions of 1848 in the German states and History of Baden.) For some years, Rastatt was one of the strongest fortresses of the German Empire, but its fortifications were dismantled in 1890.

In the same year, the town's railway station was relocated closer to the centre of Rastatt from a location that was outside the town walls but is now an industrial area.

Between 1946 and 1954, about 20 major criminal proceedings (known as the Rastatt Trials) for crimes against foreign workers and prisoners in smaller camps of the National Socialist camp system in south-western Germany took place in front of the French Military Administration's Tribunal Général on the basis of Control Council Law No. 10, along with more than 2000 defendants.

In 1992, a new Mercedes-Benz car factory started production in Rastatt.

== Local attractions ==
Rastatt and its surrounding area are home to a variety of historical buildings, includes palaces and castles such as Schloss Rastatt and Schloss Favorite, and lie in the vicinity of the Black Forest and the French border.

== Twin towns – sister cities ==
Rastatt is twinned with:

- Fano, Italy
- Guarapuava, Brazil
- New Britain, Connecticut, United States
- Orange, France
- Vantaa, Finland
- Ostrov, Czech Republic
- Woking, England, United Kingdom

== Transport ==
=== Air ===
Rastatt is served by Karlsruhe/Baden-Baden Airport, which is located 15 km (9.3 mi) to the south west of the town. Other nearby airports are Strasbourg Airport, located 81 km (50 mi) to the south-west, and Frankfurt Airport, located 151 km (94 mi) to the north.

=== Rail ===
Rastatt station provides train services to other parts of Baden-Württemberg. It is an important station for the Karlsruhe Stadtbahn and is served by four of its lines, which are operated by the Albtal-Verkehrs-Gesellschaft ("Alb Valley Transport Company", AVG). In addition, it is served by regional and long-distance trains operated by Deutsche Bahn. The station is located at chainage 96.5 km on the Rhine Valley Railway and at chainage 82.9 on the Rhine Railway (both chainages are based on the original distance from Mannheim Hauptbahnhof). The station is also the beginning of the Murg Valley Railway.

== Notable people ==
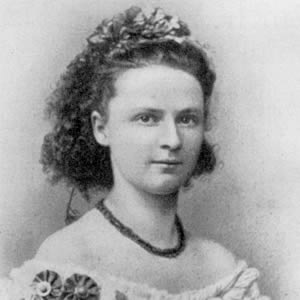
Luise Adolpha Le Beau, 1872

- Herman Fortunatus (1595–1665), Margrave of Baden-Rodemachern
- Charles William (1627–1666), Margrave of Baden-Rodemachern
- Augustus George (1706–1771), Margrave of Baden-Baden
- Joseph Frank (1771–1842), physician.
- Wilhelm Stemmermann (1888–1944), general in the Wehrmacht
- Luise Adolpha Le Beau (1850–1927), pianist and composer of classical music
- Bodo Uhse (1904–1963), writer
- Oliver Hassencamp (1921–1988), cabaret artist, actor and author
- Ricky King (born 1946), guitarist and musician
- Joachim Schuster (born 1962), politician (SDP)

=== Sport ===
- Christian Seifert (born 1969), football functionary
- Andria Lloyd (born 1971), Jamaican sprinter, studied locally, team bronze medalist at the 1996 Summer Olympics
- Philipp Laux (born 1973), footballer, played 230 games
- Christian Essig (born 1986), retired footballer, played 295 games

== In literature ==
The plot of the historical novel The Lenz Papers by Stefan Heym, published in London in 1964, is set in Rastatt in 1849, during the failed revolutions in Germany in 1848.

== Gallery ==
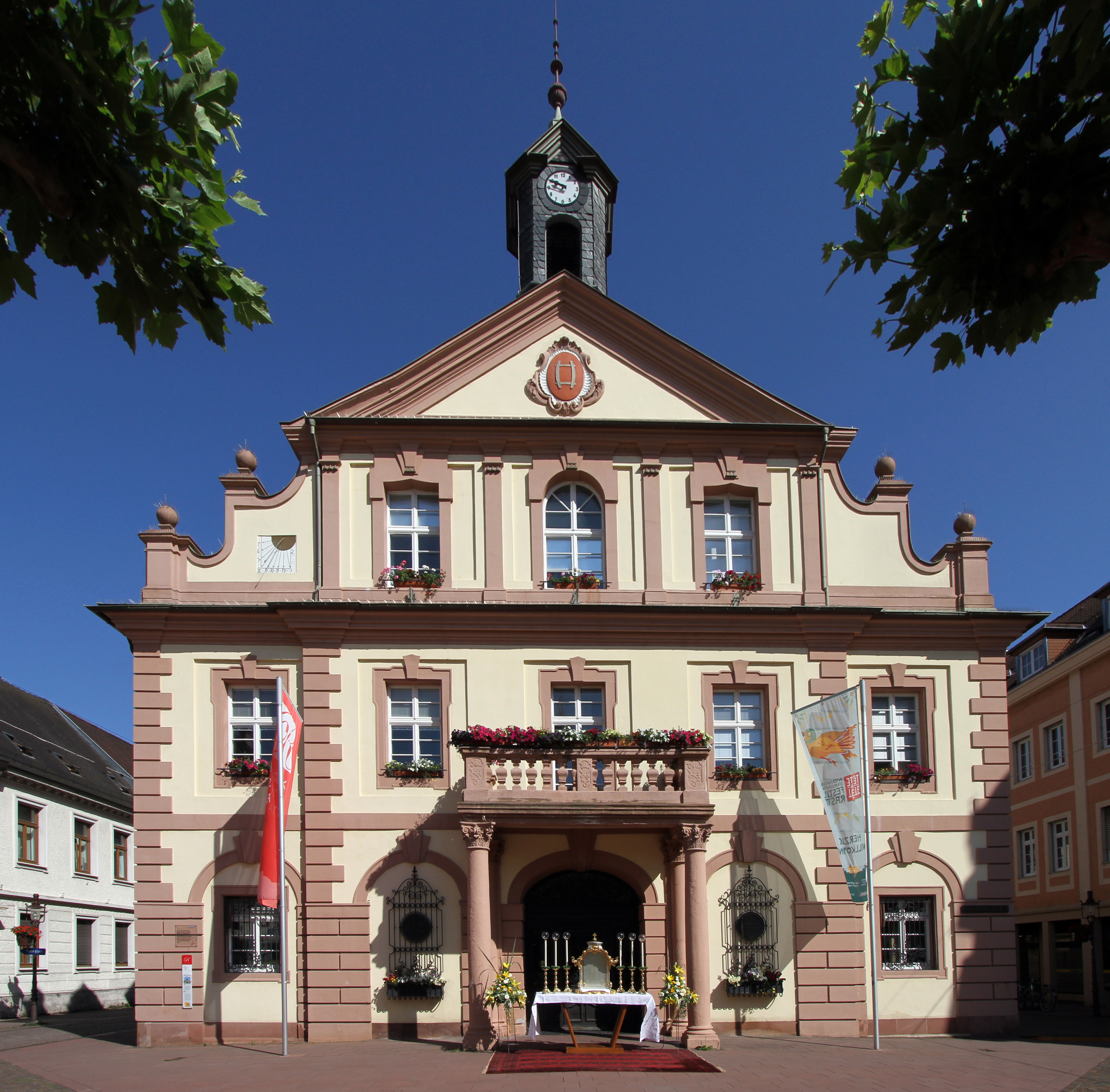
Town hall

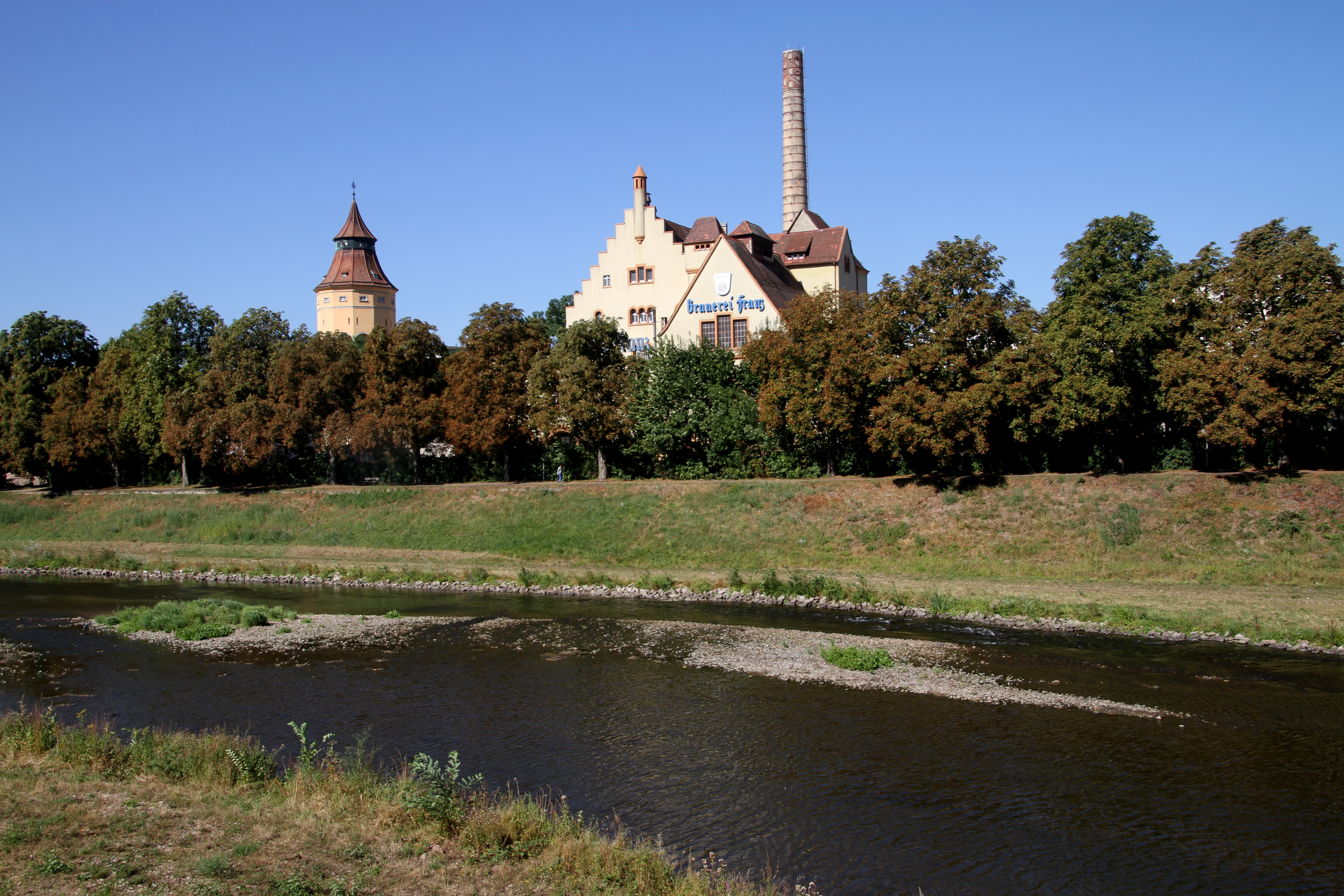
Murg river

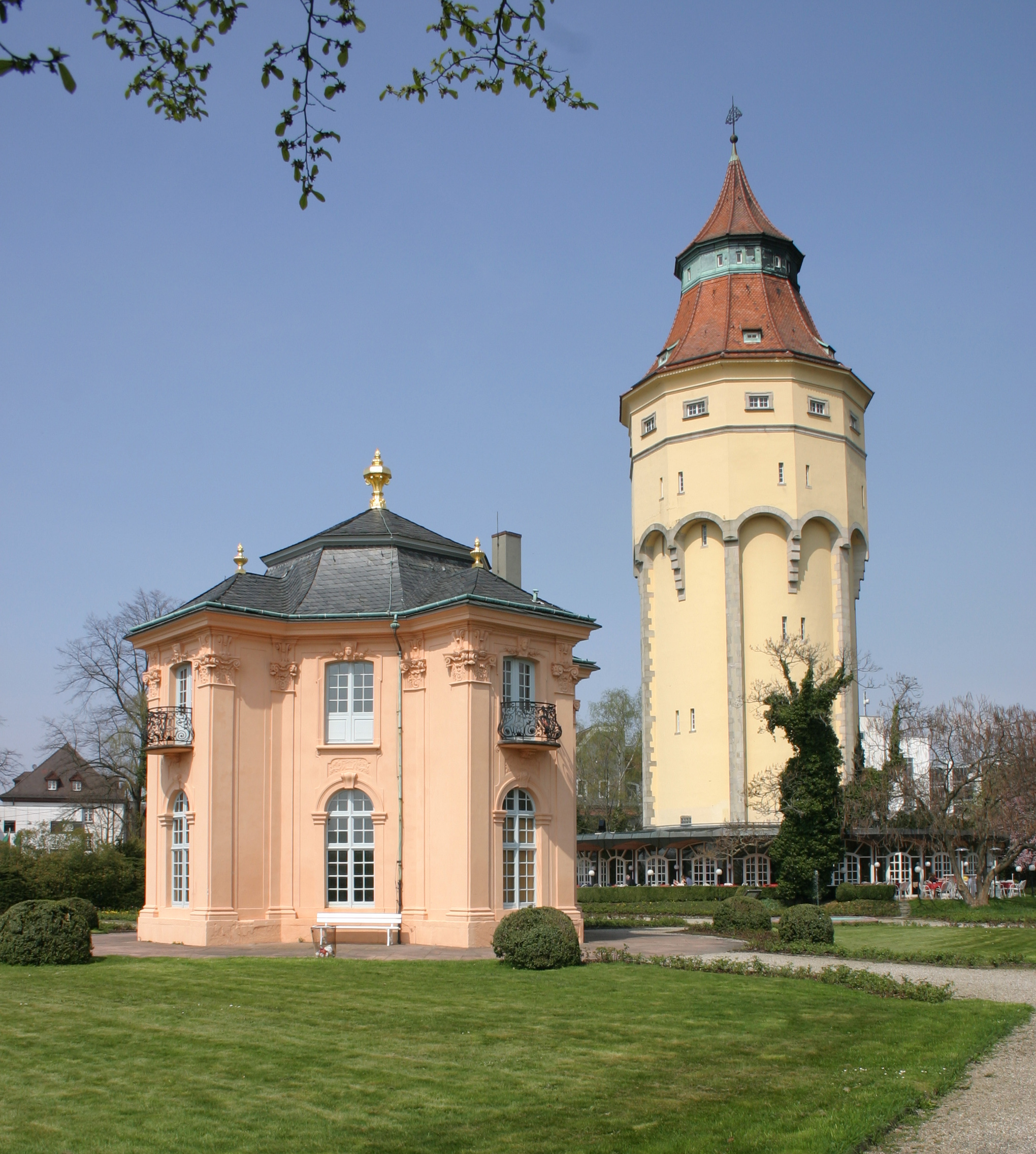
Pagodenburg and water tower

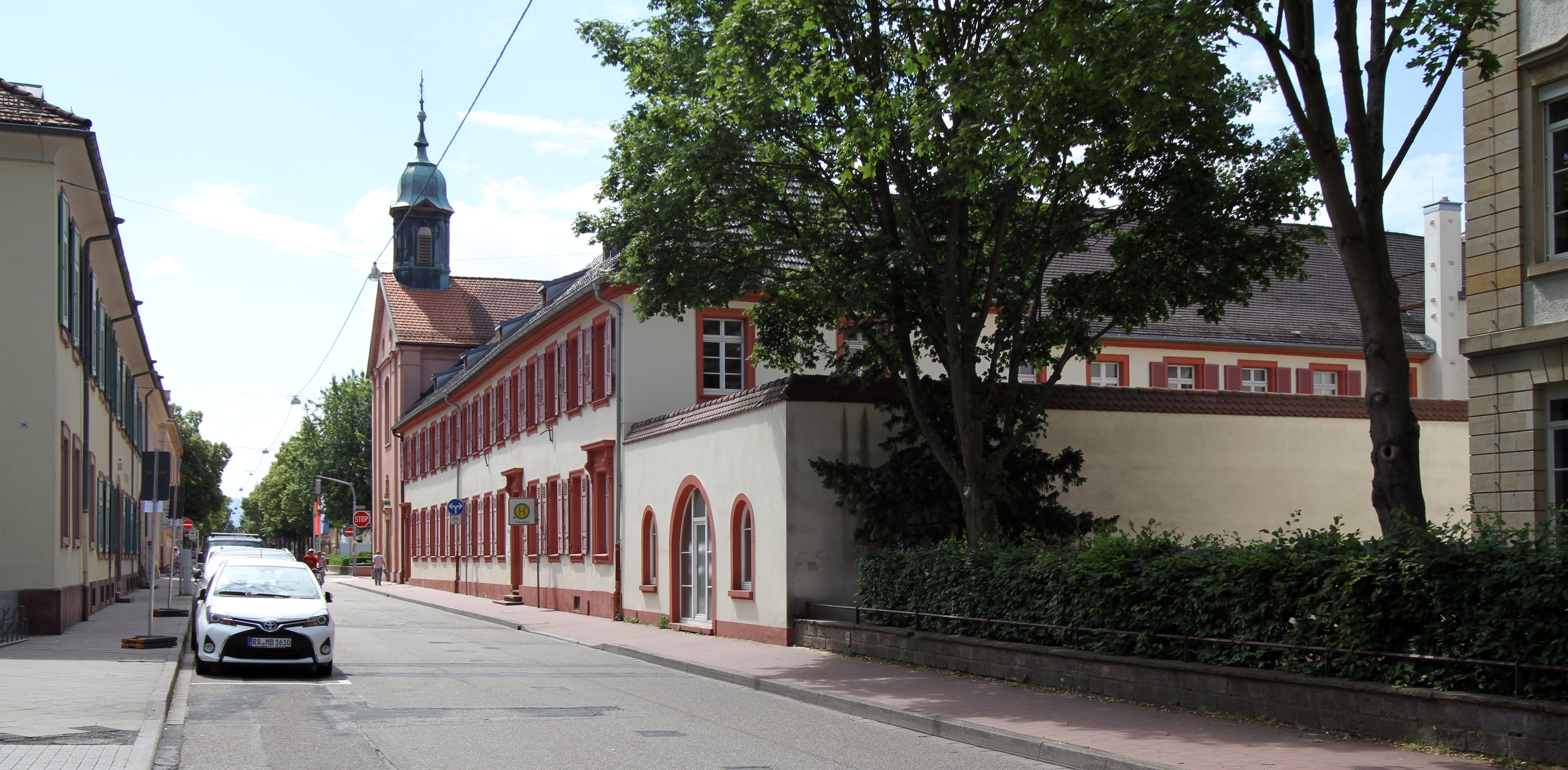
Former Franciscan monastery

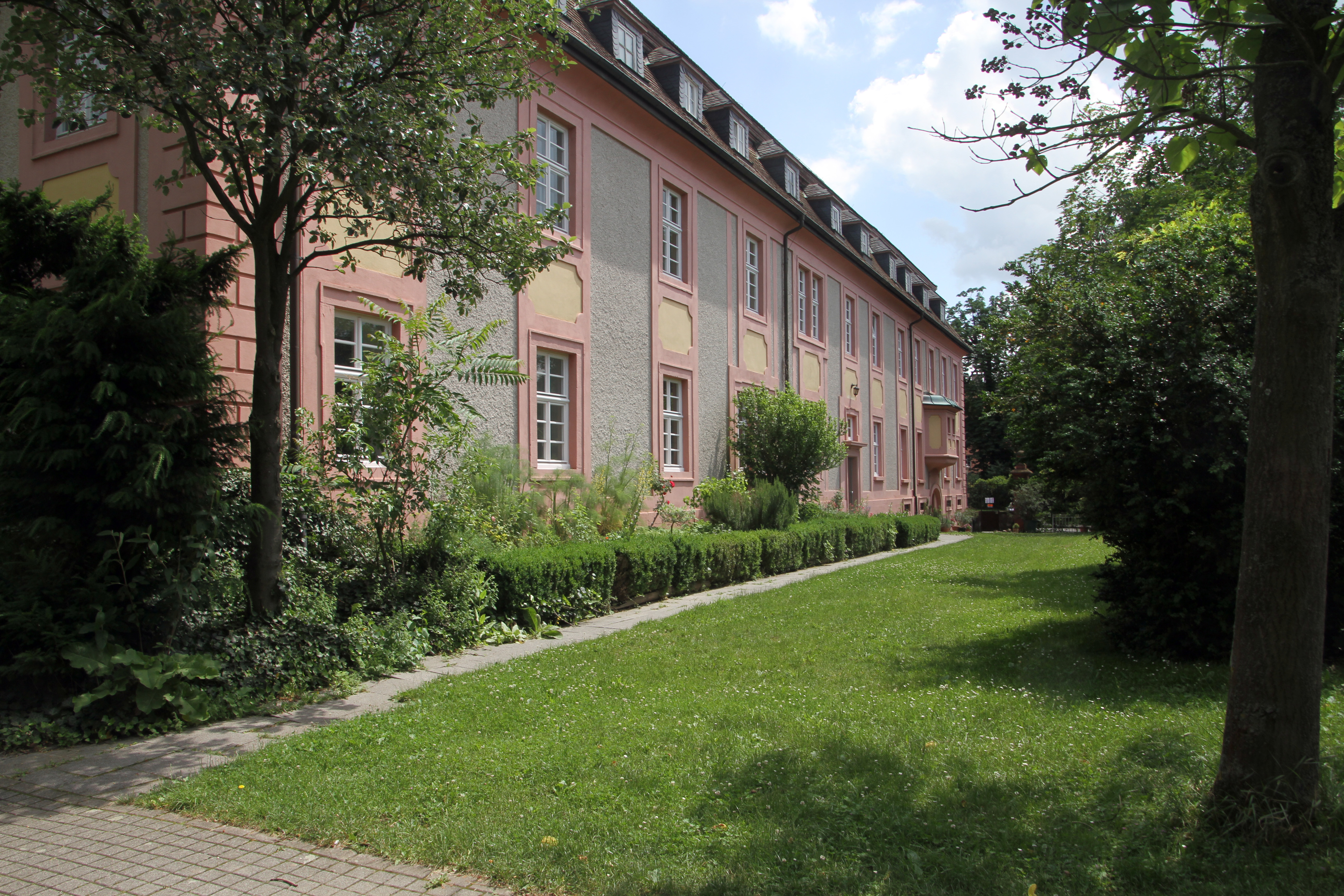
Ludwig-Wilhelm school

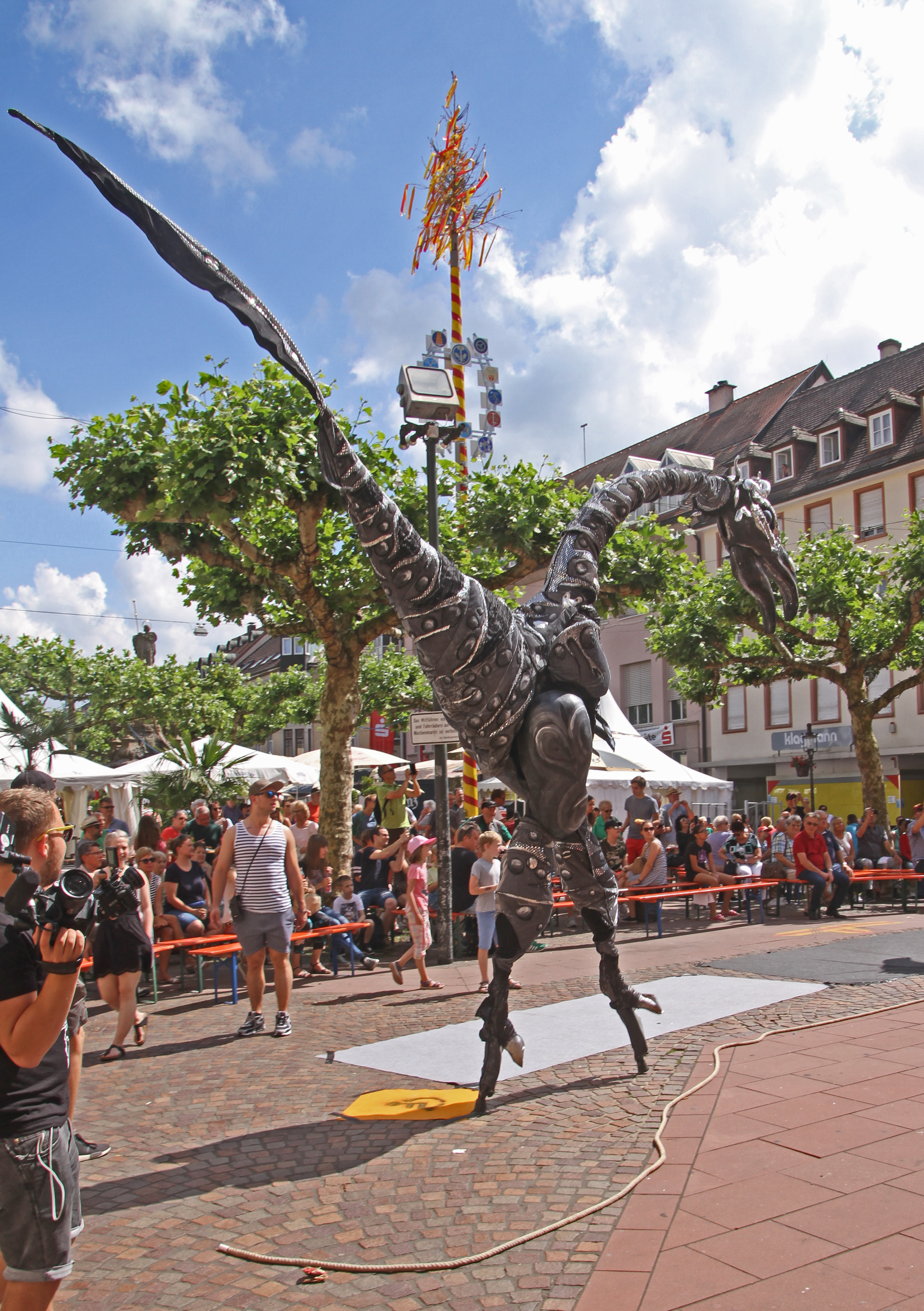
Street theatre festival

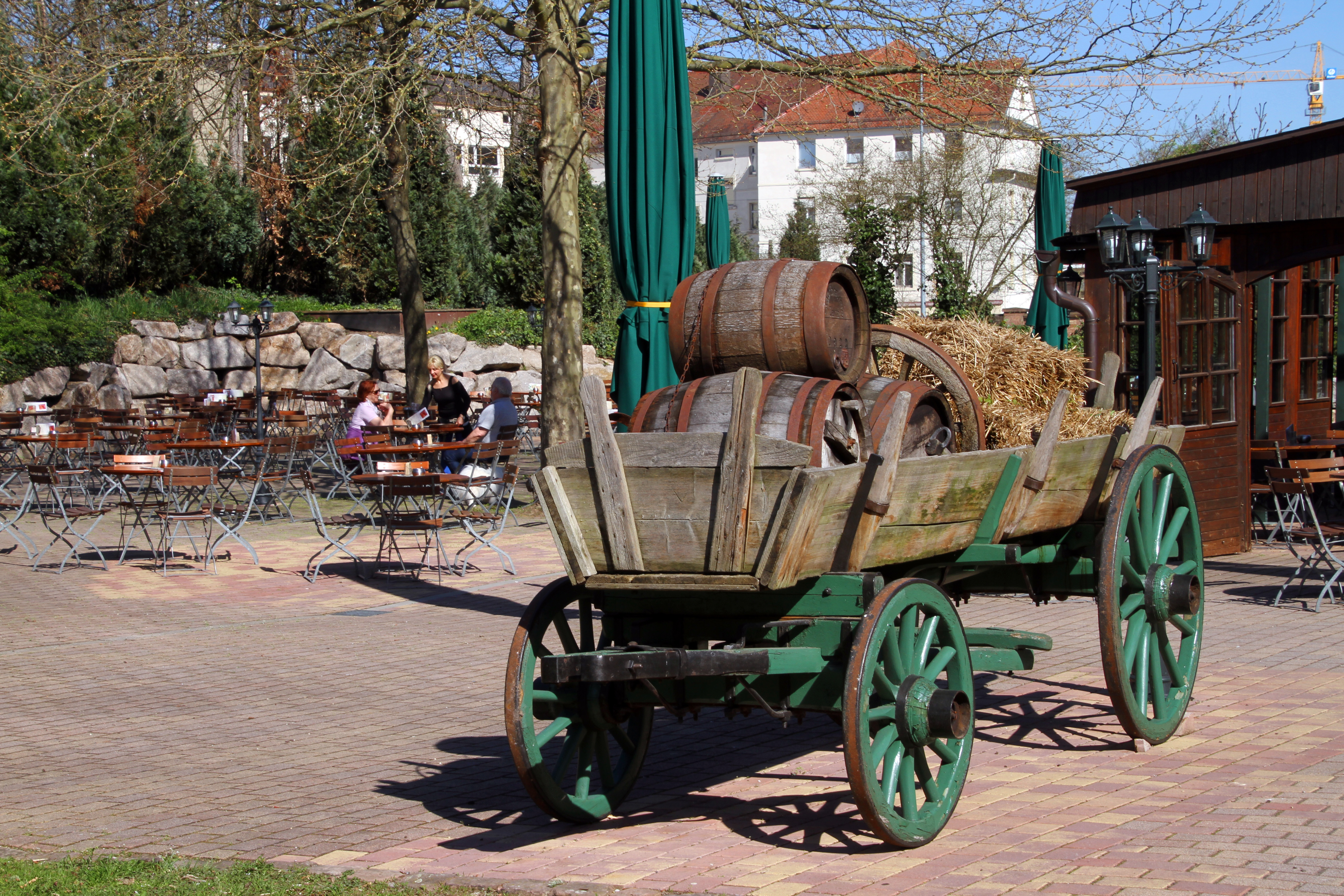
Hopfenschlingel beer garden

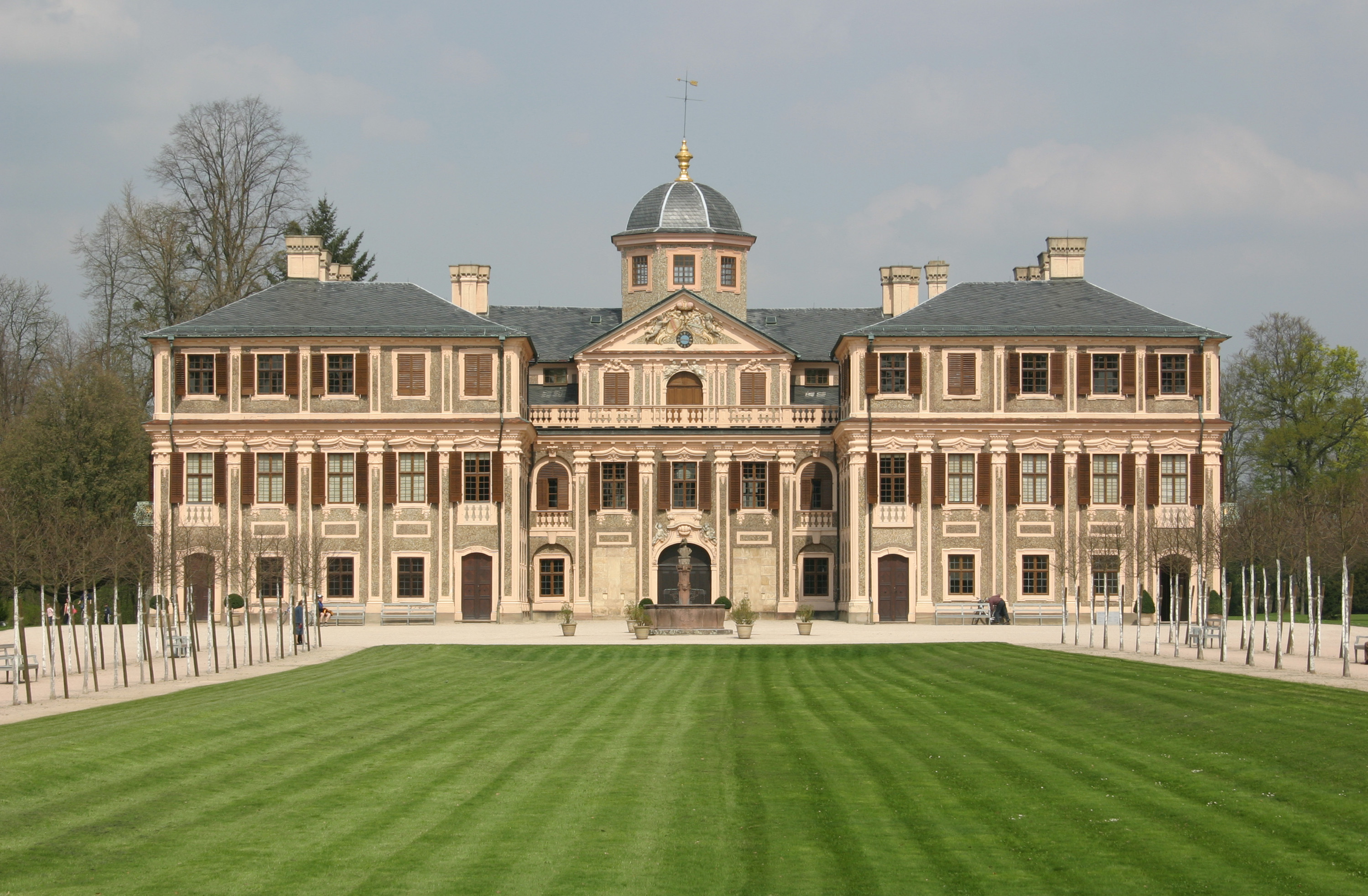
Schloss Favorite
