= Bundesliga =

German association football league

- Organising body: Bundesliga-Gruppe
- Founded: 24 August 1963; 63 years ago
- Country: Germany
- Confederation: UEFA
- Chairman: Hans-Joachim Watzke
- Chief executive officers: Marc Lenz; Steffen Merkel
- Number of clubs: 18 (since 1992–93)
- Level on pyramid: 1
- Relegation to: 2. Bundesliga
- Domestic cup: DFB-Pokal Supercup
- International cup: UEFA Champions League UEFA Europa League UEFA Conference League
- Current champions: Bayern Munich (34th title) (2025–26)
- Most championships: Bayern Munich (34 titles)
- Most appearances: Charly Körbel (602)
- Top scorer: Gerd Müller (365)
- Broadcasters: List of broadcasters
- Website: bundesliga.com
- Current: 2026–27 Bundesliga

The Bundesliga (German: [ˈbʊndəsˌliːɡa]; lit. 'Federal League'), sometimes referred to as the Fußball-Bundesliga ([ˌfuːsbal-]) or 1. Bundesliga ([ˌeːɐ̯stə-]), is a professional association football league in Germany and the highest level of the German football league system. The Bundesliga comprises 18 teams and operates on a system of promotion and relegation with the 2. Bundesliga. Seasons run from August to May. Games are played on Fridays, Saturdays and Sundays, with a focus on Saturdays. All Bundesliga clubs take part in the DFB-Pokal cup competition. The winner of the Bundesliga qualifies for the DFL-Supercup.

The Bundesliga was founded in 1962 in Dortmund, with the first season beginning in 1963–64. It was run by the Deutscher Fußball-Bund (English: German Football Association) until the Deutsche Fußball Liga (English: German Football League) took over in 2001. Fifty-eight clubs have competed in the Bundesliga since its founding. Bayern Munich has dominated with 34 of 63 titles, including 11 consecutive seasons between 2013 and 2023. Other champions include Borussia Dortmund, Hamburger SV, Werder Bremen, Bayer Leverkusen, Borussia Mönchengladbach, and VfB Stuttgart.

The Bundesliga is one of Europe's top leagues, ranking fourth in the UEFA league coefficient for 2024–25 based on results over the previous five seasons. The Bundesliga led the UEFA ranking from 1976 to 1984 and in 1990, and has produced the continent’s top-rated club eight times. Bundesliga clubs have won eight UEFA Champions League, seven UEFA Europa League, four European Cup Winners' Cup, two UEFA Super Cup, two FIFA Club World Cup, and three Intercontinental Cup titles. Its players have received ten Ballon d'Or awards, two The Best FIFA Men's Player awards, six European Golden Shoe, and three UEFA Men's Player of the Year awards, including UEFA Club Footballer of the Year. The Bundesliga is the second-highest league by average attendance as of 2024–25, with 38,656 spectators per game, behind only England's Premier League.

== Structure ==
The Bundesliga is composed of two divisions: the 1. Bundesliga (although it is rarely referred to with the First prefix), and, below that, the 2. Bundesliga (2nd Bundesliga), which has been the second tier of German football since 1974. The Bundesligen (plural) are professional leagues. Since 2008, the 3. Liga (3rd League) in Germany has also been a professional league, but may not be called Bundesliga because the league is run by the German Football Association (DFB) and not, as are the two Bundesligen, by the German Football League (DFL).

Below the level of the 3. Liga, leagues are generally subdivided on a regional basis. For example, the Regionalligen are currently made up of the Nord (North), Nordost (Northeast), Süd (South), Südwest (Southwest) and West divisions. Below this are thirteen parallel divisions, most of which are called Oberligen (upper leagues) which represent federal states or large urban and geographical areas. The levels below the Oberligen differ between the local areas. The league structure has changed frequently and typically reflects the degree of participation in the sport in various parts of the country. In the early 1990s, changes were driven by the reunification of Germany and the subsequent integration of the national league of East Germany.

Every team in the two Bundesligen must have a licence to play in the league, or else they are relegated into the regional leagues. To obtain a licence, teams must be financially healthy and meet certain standards of conduct as organisations.

As in other national leagues, there are significant benefits to being in the top division:

- A greater share of television broadcast licence revenues goes to 1. Bundesliga sides.
- 1. Bundesliga teams draw significantly greater levels of fan support. Average attendance in the first league is 39,512 per game—approximately twice the average of the 2. Bundesliga.
- Greater exposure through television and higher attendance levels helps 1. Bundesliga teams attract the most lucrative sponsorships.
- 1. Bundesliga teams develop substantial financial muscle through the combination of television and gate revenues, sponsorships and marketing of their team brands. This allows them to attract and retain skilled players from domestic and international sources and to construct first-class stadium facilities.

The 1. Bundesliga is financially strong, and the 2. Bundesliga has begun to evolve in a similar direction, becoming more stable organizationally and financially, and reflecting an increasingly higher standard of professional play.

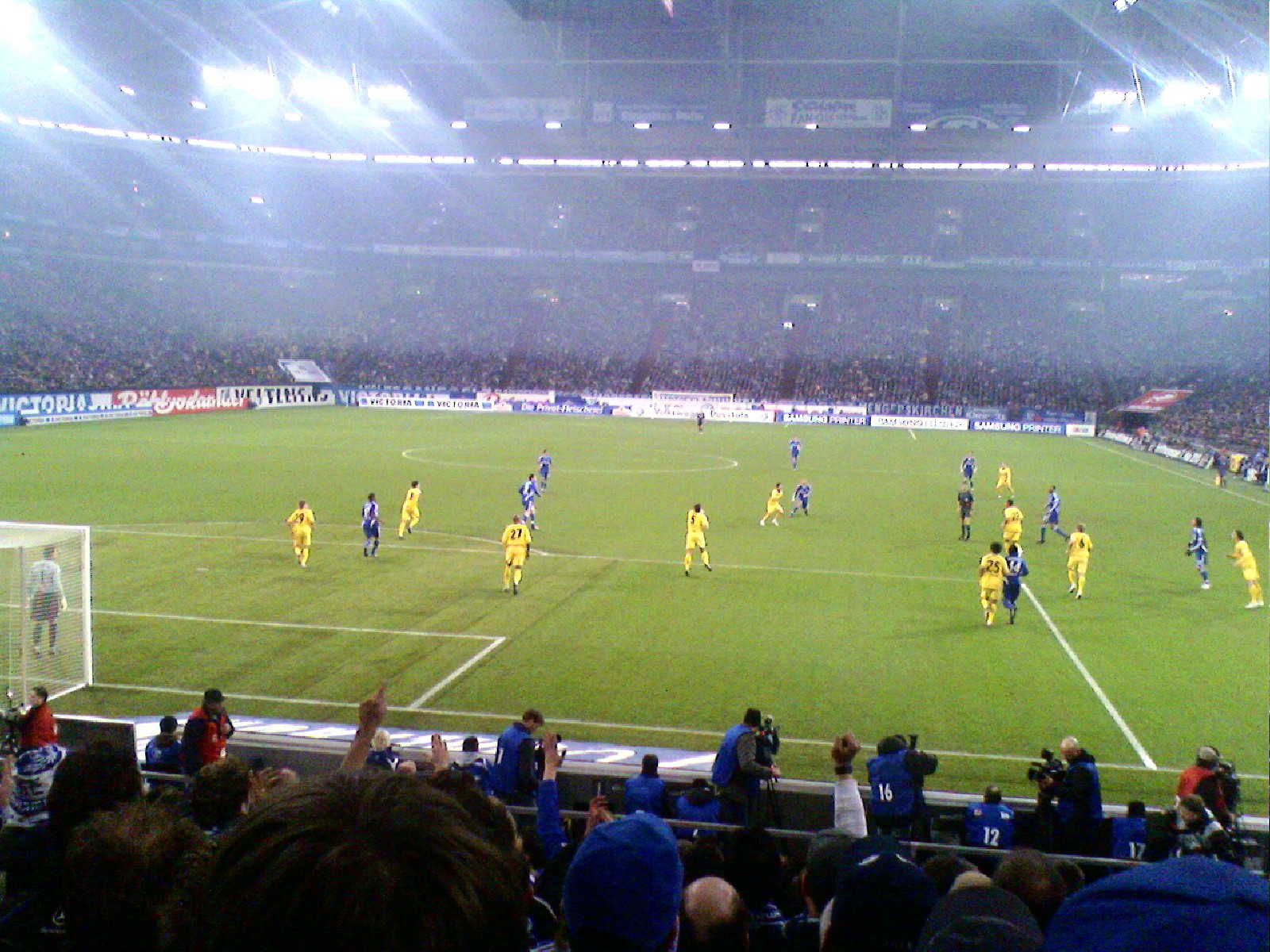
Borussia Dortmund against rivals Schalke, known as the Revierderby, in the Bundesliga in 2009

No clubs have played continuously in the Bundesliga since its foundation; on 12 May 2018, Hamburger SV was the last founding club to be relegated for the first time.

In the 2008–09 season, the Bundesliga reinstated an earlier German system of promotion and relegation, which had been in use from 1981 until 1991:

- The bottom two finishers in the Bundesliga are automatically relegated to the 2. Bundesliga, with the top two finishers in the 2. Bundesliga taking their places.
- The third-from-bottom club in the Bundesliga will play a two-legged tie with the third-place team from the 2. Bundesliga, with the winner taking up the final place in the following season's Bundesliga.

From 1992 until 2008, a different system was used, in which the bottom three finishers of the Bundesliga were automatically relegated, to be replaced by the top three finishers in the 2. Bundesliga. From 1963 until 1981 two, or later three, teams were relegated from the Bundesliga automatically, while promotion was decided either completely or partially in promotion play-offs.

The season starts in early August and lasts until late May, with a winter break of six weeks (mid-December through to the end of January). Starting with the 2002-03 season, opening matches were introduced to feature defending champions on Friday nights on the first match day. Defending champions have not lost the opening matches since then, winning 19 of the 24 matches (up to the 2025-26 season). Starting with the 2021–22 season, kick off times were changed with Friday matches starting at 8:30 pm, Saturdays at 3:30 pm and 6:30 pm, and Sundays at 3:30 pm, 5:30 pm and 7:30 pm.

== History ==
=== Origins ===
Before the formation of the Bundesliga, German football was played at an amateur level in a large number of sub-regional leagues until, in 1949, part-time (semi-) professionalism was introduced and only five regional Oberligen (Premier Leagues) remained. Regional champions played in a tournament of between eight and sixteen teams to crown a national champion. On 28 January 1900, a national association, the Deutscher Fußball Bund (DFB) had been founded in Leipzig with 86 member clubs. The first recognized national championship team was VfB Leipzig, who beat DFC Prague 7–2 in a game played at Altona on 31 May 1903.

Through the 1950s, there were continued calls for the formation of a single top-tier professional league for the country. Disadvantages to the tournament system included the fact that the top teams from different regions would play only once a year at most, and that single-elimination tournament meant that a less-deserving team could win if they hit a lucky streak during the tournament. Another concern was that professional leagues in other countries were drawing Germany's best players away from the semi-professional domestic leagues. At the international level, the German game began to falter as German teams often fared poorly against professional teams from other countries. A key supporter of the central league concept was national team head coach Sepp Herberger, who doubled as a delegate to the DFB national assembly from Mannheim and wanted Germany to catch up with centralized systems of Italy, Spain, and England.

Meanwhile, in East Germany, a separate league was established with the formation of the DS-Oberliga (Deutscher Sportausschuss Oberliga) in 1950. The league was renamed the Football Oberliga DFV in 1958 and was generally referred to simply as the DDR-Liga or DDR-Oberliga. The league fielded 14 teams with two relegation spots.

=== Foundation ===
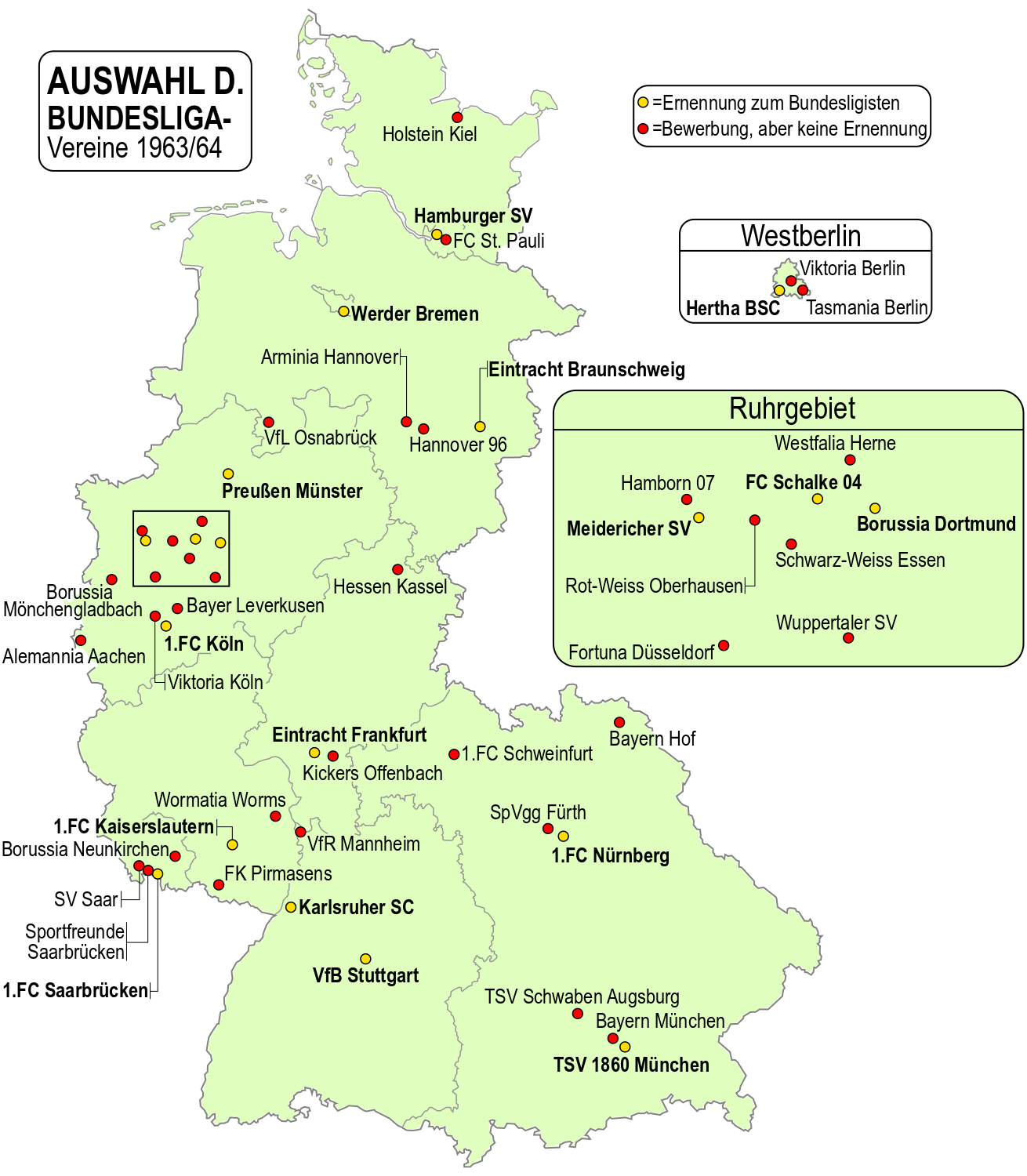

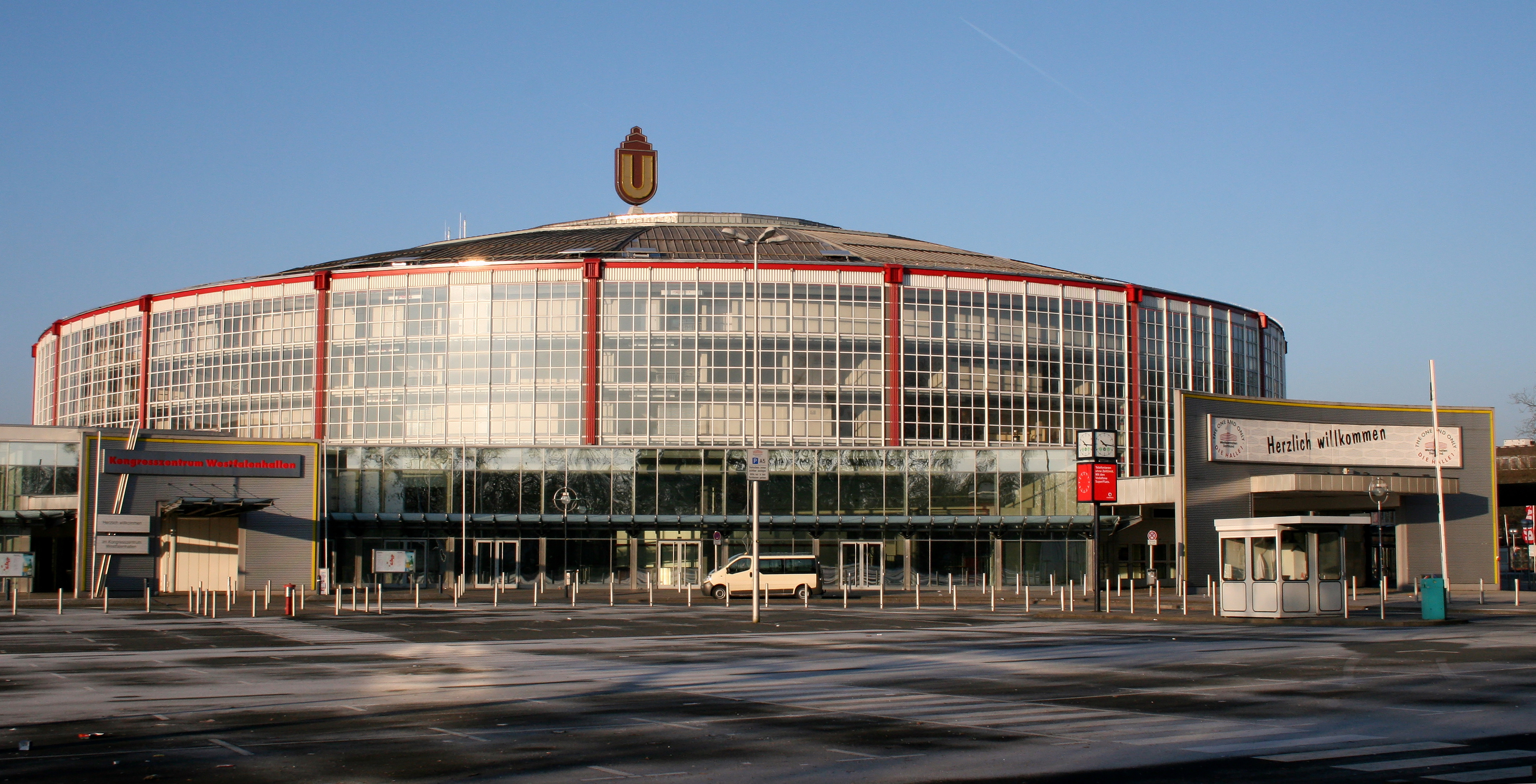
The Bundesliga was founded at the annual DFB convention at the Westfalenhallen in Dortmund on 28 July 1962.

The defeat of the national team by Yugoslavia (0–1) in a 1962 World Cup quarter-final game in Chile was one impetus (of many) towards the formation of a national league. At the annual DFB convention under new DFB president Hermann Gösmann (elected that very day) the Bundesliga was created in Dortmund at the Westfalenhallen on 28 July 1962 to begin play starting with the 1963–64 season.

At the time, there were five Oberligen (premier leagues) in place representing West Germany's North, South, West, Southwest, and Berlin. East Germany, behind the Iron Curtain, maintained its separate league structure. 46 clubs applied for admission to the new league. 16 teams were selected based on their success on the field, economic criteria and representation of the various Oberligen.

- From Oberliga Nord: Eintracht Braunschweig, Werder Bremen, Hamburger SV
- From Oberliga West: Borussia Dortmund, 1. FC Köln, Meidericher SV Duisburg, Preußen Münster, Schalke 04
- From Oberliga Südwest: 1. FC Kaiserslautern, 1. FC Saarbrücken
- From Oberliga Süd: Eintracht Frankfurt, Karlsruher SC, 1. FC Nürnberg, 1860 Munich, VfB Stuttgart
- From Oberliga Berlin: Hertha BSC

The first Bundesliga games were played on 24 August 1963. Early favorite 1. FC Köln was the first Bundesliga champion with second place clubs Meidericher SV and Eintracht Frankfurt.

=== Reunification ===
Following German reunification in 1990, the East German leagues were merged into the West German system. Dynamo Dresden and FC Hansa Rostock were seeded into the top-tier Bundesliga division ahead of the 1991–92 Bundesliga, with other clubs being sorted into lower tiers.

=== 21st century ===
Gazprom became a major sponsor of Bundesliga football in 2006, with Gerhard Schröder's climb to the top of the company.

== Competition format ==
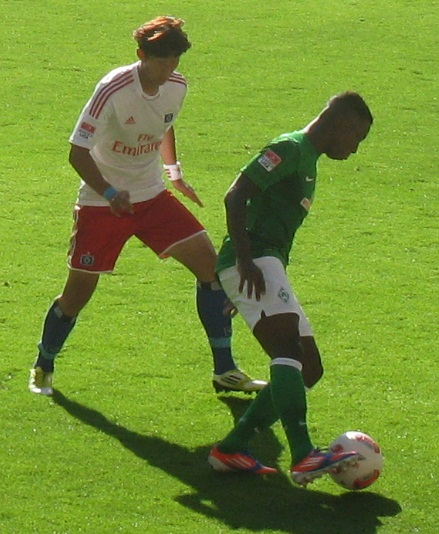
Son Heung-min of Hamburger SV against Eljero Elia of Werder Bremen in the Nordderby

The German football champion is decided strictly by play in the Bundesliga. Each club plays every other club once at home and once away, which makes a total of 34 matchdays per season. Originally, a victory was worth two points, with one point for a draw and none for a loss. Since the 1995–96 season, a victory has been worth three points, while a draw remains worth a single point, and zero points are given for a loss. The club with the most points at the end of the season becomes the German champion. Currently, the top four clubs in the table qualify automatically for the group phase of the UEFA Champions League. The two teams at the bottom of the table are relegated into the 2. Bundesliga, while the top two teams in the 2. Bundesliga are promoted. The 16th-placed team (third-last) in the 1. Bundesliga and the third-placed team in the 2. Bundesliga play a two-leg play-off match. The winner of this match plays the next season in the 1. Bundesliga, and the losing side in the 2. Bundesliga.

If teams are level on points, tie-breakers are applied in the following order:

1. Goal difference for the entire season
2. Total goals scored for the entire season
3. Head-to-head results (total points)
4. Head-to-head goals scored
5. Head-to-head away goals scored
6. Total away goals scored for the entire season

If two clubs are still tied after all of these tie-breakers have been applied, a single match is held at a neutral site to determine the placement. However, this has never been necessary in the history of the Bundesliga.

In terms of team selection, matchday squads must have no more than five non-EU representatives. Nine substitutes are permitted to be selected, from which five can be used in the duration of the game.

=== Changes in league structure ===
- Number of teams:
  - 1963–64 to 1964–65: 16
  - 1965–66 to 1990–91: 18
  - 1991–92: 20, while the East German league was being included after German reunification
  - Since 1992–93: 18
- Number of teams relegated (automatic relegation except as noted):
  - 1963–64 to 1973–74: 2
  - 1974–75 to 1980–81: 3
  - 1981–82 to 1990–91: 2 automatic plus the 16th-place team in the First Bundesliga played a two-leg relegation match against the third-place team of the Second Bundesliga for the final spot in the First Bundesliga
  - 1991–92: 4
  - 1992–93 to 2007–08: 3
  - Since 2008–09: 2 automatic plus the 16th-place team in the First Bundesliga playing a two-leg relegation match against the third-place team of the Second Bundesliga for the final spot in the First Bundesliga

=== Qualification for European competitions ===
- 1st, 2nd, 3rd, and 4th place: League phase of UEFA Champions League
- 5th place: League phase of UEFA Europa League
- 6th place: Play-off round of UEFA Conference League
- Until the 2016–17 season, an additional place in the Europa League could also be granted via the UEFA Fair Play mechanism. This rule was maintained from the UEFA Cup. The last Bundesliga team to gain entry to the UEFA Cup via the fair play rule was Mainz 05 in 2005–06.
- DFB-Pokal (German Cup) winner: Qualifies for the group stage of Europa League regardless of league position.
  - Until 2015–16, if the Cup winner qualified for the Champions League or Europa League by more than one method, the cup winner's place in the Europa League went to the losing cup finalist if it had not already qualified for European competition, entering the competition a stage earlier than if it had won the Cup. This rule was retained from the Europa League's predecessor, the UEFA Cup. From 2015–16, the runners-up no longer qualified for the Europa League, and the Europa League berth reserved for the DFB-Pokal winners is transferred to the highest finisher below the european qualification places.
    - Prior to 2015–16, the team that benefited from that rule did not necessarily have to be a Bundesliga member. For example, although 2. Bundesliga sides Alemannia Aachen lost to Werder Bremen in the 2004 DFB-Pokal final, Alemannia secured an entry in the 2004–05 UEFA Cup, because Werder qualified for the Champions League as First Bundesliga champions.

The number of German clubs which may participate in UEFA competitions is determined by UEFA coefficients, which takes into account the results of a particular nation's clubs in UEFA competitions over the preceding five years.

History of European qualification

- European Cup/Champions League:
  - Up to and including 1996–97: German champion only.
  - 1997–99: Top two teams; champions automatically into group phase, runners-up entered the qualifying round.
  - 1999–2008: Top two teams automatically into first group phase (only one group phase starting in 2003–04). Depending on the DFB's UEFA coefficients standing, either one or two other clubs (most recently one) entered at the third qualifying round; winners at this level entered the group phase.
  - 2008–11: Top two teams automatically into group phase. Third placed team had to play in the play-off round for the right to play in the group stage.
- UEFA Cup/Europa League:
  - From 1971–72 to 1998–99, UEFA member nations could send between one and four teams to the UEFA Cup. Germany was always entitled to send at least three teams to the competition and often as many as four. From 1978–79, the number of participants was determined by the DFB's UEFA coefficient standing, prior to this the method for deciding the number of participants is unknown. The best performing teams in the league other than the champion would qualify, although if one of these teams was also winner of the DFB-Pokal then they would enter the Cup Winners' Cup instead and their UEFA Cup place would be taken by the next highest-placed team in the league (5th or 6th place). Briefly in the mid-1970s the DFB decided to allocate the last UEFA Cup place to the DFB-Pokal runner-up instead of a third or fourth team qualified by performance in the league, meaning that at this point the DFB-Pokal qualified two teams for European competition (winners for the Cup Winners' Cup, runners-up for the UEFA Cup). This policy was unique amongst UEFA member associations and was dropped after only a few seasons. Starting with the 1999–2000 season and the abolition of the Cup Winners' Cup (which was then folded into the UEFA Cup), the DFB-Pokal winner now automatically qualified for the UEFA Cup alongside, depending on the DFB's UEFA coefficients standing, between one and three extra participants (if the DFB-Pokal winner also qualified for the Champions League, they were replaced by the DFB-Pokal runner-up; if they were also qualified for the Champions League, the UEFA Cup place went to the next best placed team in the league not otherwise qualified for European competition). Since 1999, the DFB has always been entitled to enter a minimum of three clubs in the UEFA Cup/Europa League, and at times as many as four (the maximum for any European federation). Teams that entered via UEFA's Fair Play mechanism, or those that entered through the now-defunct Intertoto Cup, did not count against the national quota. From 2006 through the final Intertoto Cup in 2008, only one First Bundesliga side was eligible to enter the Intertoto Cup and possibly earn a UEFA Cup berth. For the 2005–06 season, the DFB earned an extra UEFA Cup place via the Fair Play draw; this place went to Mainz 05 as the highest-ranked club in the Fair Play table of the First Bundesliga not already qualified for Europe.
- Cup Winners' Cup (abolished after 1999):
  - The winner of the DFB-Pokal entered the Cup Winners' Cup, unless that team was also league champion and therefore competing in the European Cup/Champions League, in which case their place in the Cup Winners' Cup was taken by the DFB-Pokal runner-up. Today, the DFB-Pokal winner (if not otherwise qualified for the Champions League) enters the UEFA Europa League.

== Clubs ==
Club	Position in 2025–26	First Bundesliga season	Number of seasons in Bundesliga	First season of current spell	Number of seasons of current spell	Bundesliga titles	National titles	Last title
FC Augsburg^{b}	9th	2011–12	16	2011–12	16	0	0	–
Bayer Leverkusen^{b}	6th	1979–80	48	1979–80	48	1	1	2024
Bayern Munich^{b}	1st	1965–66	62	1965–66	62	34	35	2026
Borussia Dortmund^{a}	2nd	1963–64	60	1976–77	51	5	8	2012
Borussia Mönchengladbach	12th	1965–66	59	2008–09	19	5	5	1977
Eintracht Frankfurt^{a}	8th	1963–64	58	2012–13	15	0	1	1959
SC Elversberg	2nd (2. B)	2026–27	1	2026–27	1	0	0	–
SC Freiburg	7th	1993–94	27	2016–17	11	0	0	–
Hamburger SV^{a}	13th	1963–64	57	2025–26	2	3	6	1983
TSG Hoffenheim^{b}	5th	2008–09	19	2008–09	19	0	0	–
1. FC Köln^{a}	14th	1963–64	54	2025–26	2	1	2	1978
RB Leipzig^{b}	3rd	2016–17	11	2016–17	11	0	0	–
Mainz 05	10th	2004–05	21	2009–10	18	0	0	–
SC Paderborn	3rd (2. B)	2014–15	3	2026–27	1	0	0	–
Schalke 04^{a}	1st (2. B)	1963–64	53	2026–27	1	0	7	1958
VfB Stuttgart^{a}	4th	1963–64	60	2020–21	7	3	5	2007
Union Berlin^{b}	11th	2019–20	8	2019–20	8	0	0	–
Werder Bremen^{a}	15th	1963–64	62	2022–23	5	4	4	2004

^{a} Founding member of the Bundesliga
^{b} Never been relegated from the Bundesliga

=== Members for 2026–27 ===
Locations of the 2026–27 Bundesliga teams

Team	Location	Stadium	Capacity	R.
FC Augsburg	Augsburg	WWK Arena	30,660	
Union Berlin	Berlin	Stadion An der Alten Försterei	22,012	
Werder Bremen	Bremen	Weserstadion	42,100	
Borussia Dortmund	Dortmund	Signal Iduna Park	81,365	
SV Elversberg	Spiesen-Elversberg	Waldstadion an der Kaiserlinde	10,000	
Eintracht Frankfurt	Frankfurt	Deutsche Bank Park	59,500	
SC Freiburg	Freiburg im Breisgau	Europa-Park Stadion	34,700	
Hamburger SV	Hamburg	Volksparkstadion	57,000	
TSG Hoffenheim	Sinsheim	PreZero Arena	30,150	
1. FC Köln	Cologne	RheinEnergieStadion	49,698	
RB Leipzig	Leipzig	Red Bull Arena	47,800	
Bayer Leverkusen	Leverkusen	BayArena	30,210	
Mainz 05	Mainz	MEWA Arena	33,305	
Borussia Mönchengladbach	Mönchengladbach	Borussia-Park	54,057	
Bayern Munich	Munich	Allianz Arena	75,000	
SC Paderborn	Paderborn	Home Deluxe Arena	15,000	
Schalke 04	Gelsenkirchen	Veltins-Arena	62,271	
VfB Stuttgart	Stuttgart	MHPArena	60,058	

=== Seasons in Bundesliga ===
There are 59 teams that have taken part in 64 Bundesliga championships that were played from the 1963–64 season until the 2026–27 season. The teams in bold compete in the Bundesliga currently. The year in parentheses represents the most recent year of participation at this level. No team has played Bundesliga football in every season; the closest being Bayern Munich and Werder Bremen, who have both played in 62 seasons.

- **62** seasons: **Bayern Munich** (2027), **Werder Bremen** (2027)
- **60** seasons: **Borussia Dortmund** (2027), **VfB Stuttgart** (2027)
- **59** seasons: **Borussia Mönchengladbach** (2027)
- **58** seasons: **Eintracht Frankfurt** (2027)
- **57** seasons: **Hamburger SV** (2027)
- **55** seasons: **Schalke 04** (2027)
- **54** seasons: **1. FC Köln** (2027)
- **48** seasons: **Bayer Leverkusen** (2027)
- **44** seasons: 1. FC Kaiserslautern (2012)
- **40** seasons: Hertha BSC (2023)
- **38** seasons: VfL Bochum (2025)
- **33** seasons: 1. FC Nürnberg (2019)
- **30** seasons: Hannover 96 (2019)
- **29** seasons: VfL Wolfsburg (2026)
- **28** seasons: MSV Duisburg (2008)
- **27** seasons: **SC Freiburg** (2027)
- **25** seasons: Fortuna Düsseldorf (2020)
- **24** seasons: Karlsruher SC (2009)
- **21** seasons: Eintracht Braunschweig (2014), **Mainz 05** (2027)
- **20** seasons: 1860 Munich (2004)
- **19** seasons: Arminia Bielefeld (2022), **TSG Hoffenheim** (2027)
- **16** seasons: **FC Augsburg** (2027)
- **14** seasons: KFC Uerdingen (1996)
- **12** seasons: Hansa Rostock (2008)
- **11** seasons: **RB Leipzig** (2027)
- **10** seasons: FC St. Pauli (2026)
- **8** seasons: **Union Berlin** (2027)
- **7** seasons: Rot-Weiss Essen (1977), Kickers Offenbach (1984), Waldhof Mannheim (1990)
- **6** seasons: Energie Cottbus (2009)
- **5** seasons: 1. FC Saarbrücken (1993), Darmstadt 98 (2024)
- **4** seasons: Rot-Weiß Oberhausen (1973), SG Wattenscheid (1994), Dynamo Dresden (1995), Alemannia Aachen (2007)
- **3** seasons: Borussia Neunkirchen (1968), Wuppertaler SV (1975), FC 08 Homburg (1990), 1. FC Heidenheim (2026), **SC Paderborn** (2027)
- **2** seasons: Tennis Borussia Berlin (1977), Stuttgarter Kickers (1992), SpVgg Unterhaching (2001), FC Ingolstadt (2017), Greuther Fürth (2022)
- **1** season: Preußen Münster (1964), Tasmania Berlin (1966), Fortuna Köln (1974), Blau-Weiß 90 Berlin (1987), VfB Leipzig (1994), SSV Ulm (2000), Holstein Kiel (2025), **SV Elversberg** (2027)

== Business model ==
In the 2009–10 season the Bundesliga's turnover was €1.7bn, broken down into match-day revenue (€424m), sponsorship receipts (€573m) and broadcast income (€594m). That year it was the only European football league where clubs collectively made a profit. Bundesliga clubs paid less than 50% of revenue in players' wages, the lowest percentage out of the European leagues. The Bundesliga has the lowest ticket prices and the highest average attendance among Europe's five major leagues.

Bundesliga clubs tend to form close associations with local firms, several of which have since grown into big global companies; in a comparison of leading Bundesliga and Premiership clubs, Bayern Munich received 55% of its revenue from company sponsorship deals, while Manchester United got 37%.

Bundesliga clubs are required to be majority-owned by German club members (known as the 50+1 rule to discourage control by a single entity) and operate under tight restrictions on the use of debt for acquisitions (a team only receives an operating licence if it has solid financials); as a result 11 of the 18 clubs were profitable after the 2008–09 season. By contrast, in the other major European leagues numerous high-profile teams have come under ownership of foreign billionaires and a significant number of clubs have high levels of debt.

Exceptions to the 50+1 rule allow Bayer Leverkusen, TSG 1899 Hoffenheim, and VfL Wolfsburg to be owned by corporations or individual investors. In the cases of Bayer Leverkusen and Wolfsburg, the clubs were founded by major corporations (respectively Bayer AG and Volkswagen) as sports clubs for their employees, while Hoffenheim has long received its primary support from SAP co-founder Dietmar Hopp, who played in the club's youth system.

After 2000 the German Football Association and the Bundesliga required every club to run a youth academy with the aim of developing local talent for the club and the national team. As of 2010 the Bundesliga and second Bundesliga spend €75m a year on these youth academies, which train five thousand players aged 12–18. This increased the percentage of under-23-year-olds in the Bundesliga from 6% in 2000 to 15% in 2010. This in turn allows more money to be spent on the smaller number of players that are bought.

In the 2000s, the Bundesliga was regarded as competitive, as five teams won the league title. This contrasted with the English Premier League, then dominated by a "Big Four" (Manchester United, Chelsea, Liverpool, and Arsenal), as well as France's Ligue 1, won seven consecutive years by Lyon. Since then, however, a resurgent Bayern Munich won each year from 2013 to 2023.

=== Financial regulations ===
For a number of years, the clubs in the Bundesliga have been subject to regulations not unlike the UEFA Financial Fair Play Regulations agreed upon in September 2009.

At the end of each season, clubs in the Bundesliga must apply to the German Football Federation (DFB) for a licence to participate again the following year; only when the DFB, who have access to all transfer documents and accounts, are satisfied that there is no threat of insolvency do they give approval. The DFB have a system of fines and points deductions for clubs who flout rules, and those who go into the red can only buy a player after selling one for at least the same amount. In addition, no individual is allowed to own more than 49 per cent of any Bundesliga club, the only exceptions being VfL Wolfsburg, Bayer Leverkusen and current Regionalliga Nordost member FC Carl Zeiss Jena should they ever be promoted to the Bundesliga, as they were each founded as factory teams.

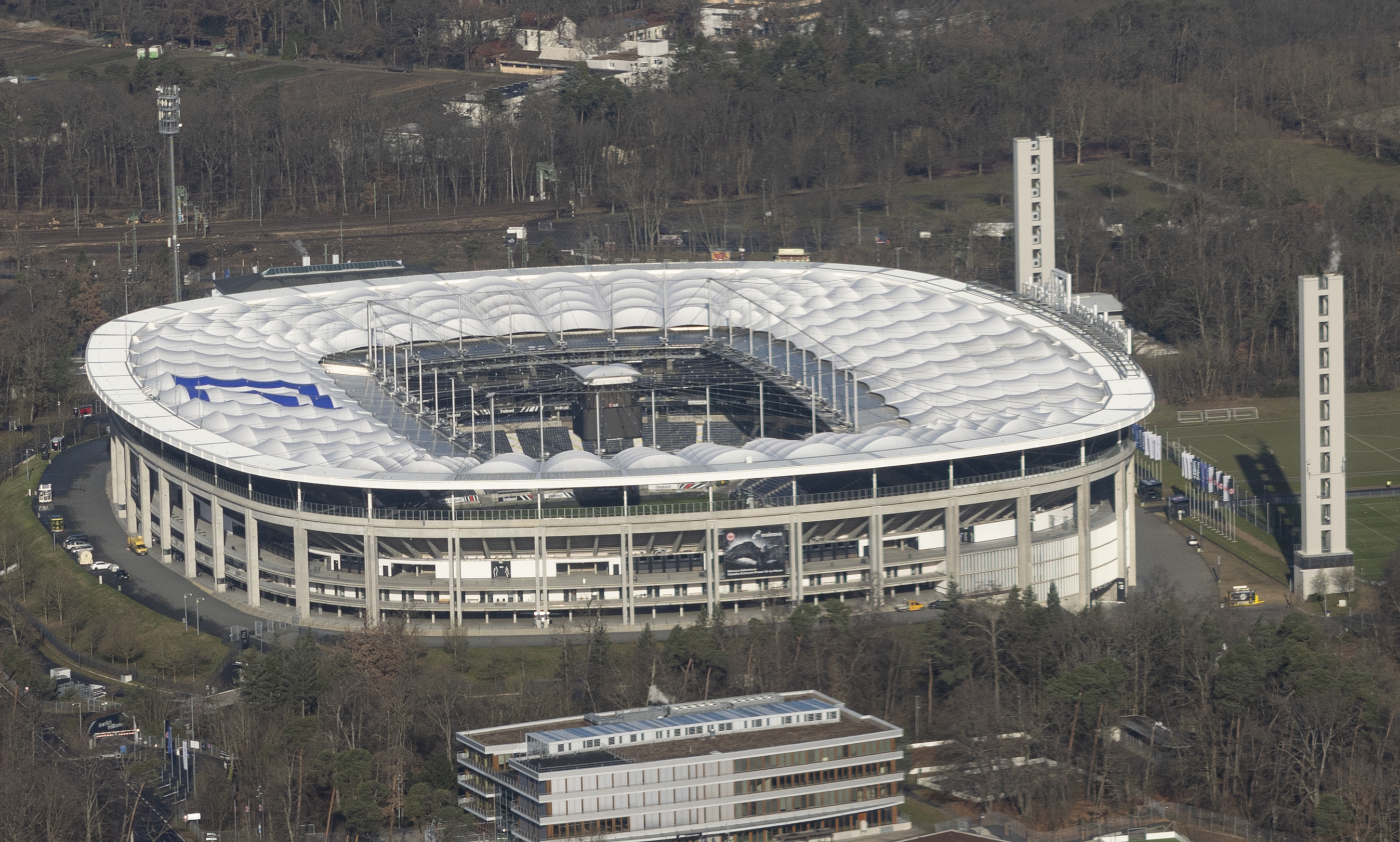
Deutsche Bank Park is the home ground of Eintracht Frankfurt.

Despite the good economic governance, there have still been some instances of clubs getting into difficulties. In 2004, Borussia Dortmund reported a debt of €118.8 million (£83 million). Having won the Champions League in 1997 and a number of Bundesliga titles, Dortmund had gambled on maintaining their success with an expensive group of largely foreign players but failed, narrowly escaping liquidation in 2006. In subsequent years, the club went through extensive restructuring to return to financial health, largely with young home-grown players. In 2004 Hertha BSC reported debts of £24.7 million and were able to continue in the Bundesliga only after proving they had long term credit with their bank.

The leading German club Bayern Munich made a net profit of just €2.5 million in 2008–09 season (group accounts), while Schalke 04 made a net loss of €30.4 million in 2009 financial year. Borussia Dortmund GmbH & Co. KGaA, made a net loss of just €2.9 million in 2008–09 season.

=== Attendances ===
The Bundesliga is one of the highest-attended association football leagues worldwide, with an average of 38,657 spectators per game during the 2024–25 season making it the second highest attended association football league globally. Bundesliga club Borussia Dortmund holds the record for the highest average attendance of any football club in the world.

Out of Europe's five major football leagues (Premier League, La Liga, Ligue 1, and Serie A ), the Bundesliga has the lowest ticket prices and the highest average attendance. Many club stadia have large terraced areas for standing fans. Teams limit the number of season tickets to ensure everyone has a chance to see the games live, and the away club has the right to 10% of the available capacity. Match tickets often double as free rail passes which encourages supporters to travel and celebrate in a relaxed atmosphere. According to Bundesliga chief executive Christian Seifert, tickets are inexpensive (especially for standing room) as "It is not in the clubs' culture so much [to raise prices]. They are very fan orientated". Uli Hoeneß, president of Bayern Munich, was quoted as saying "We do not think the fans are like cows to be milked. Football has got to be for everybody."

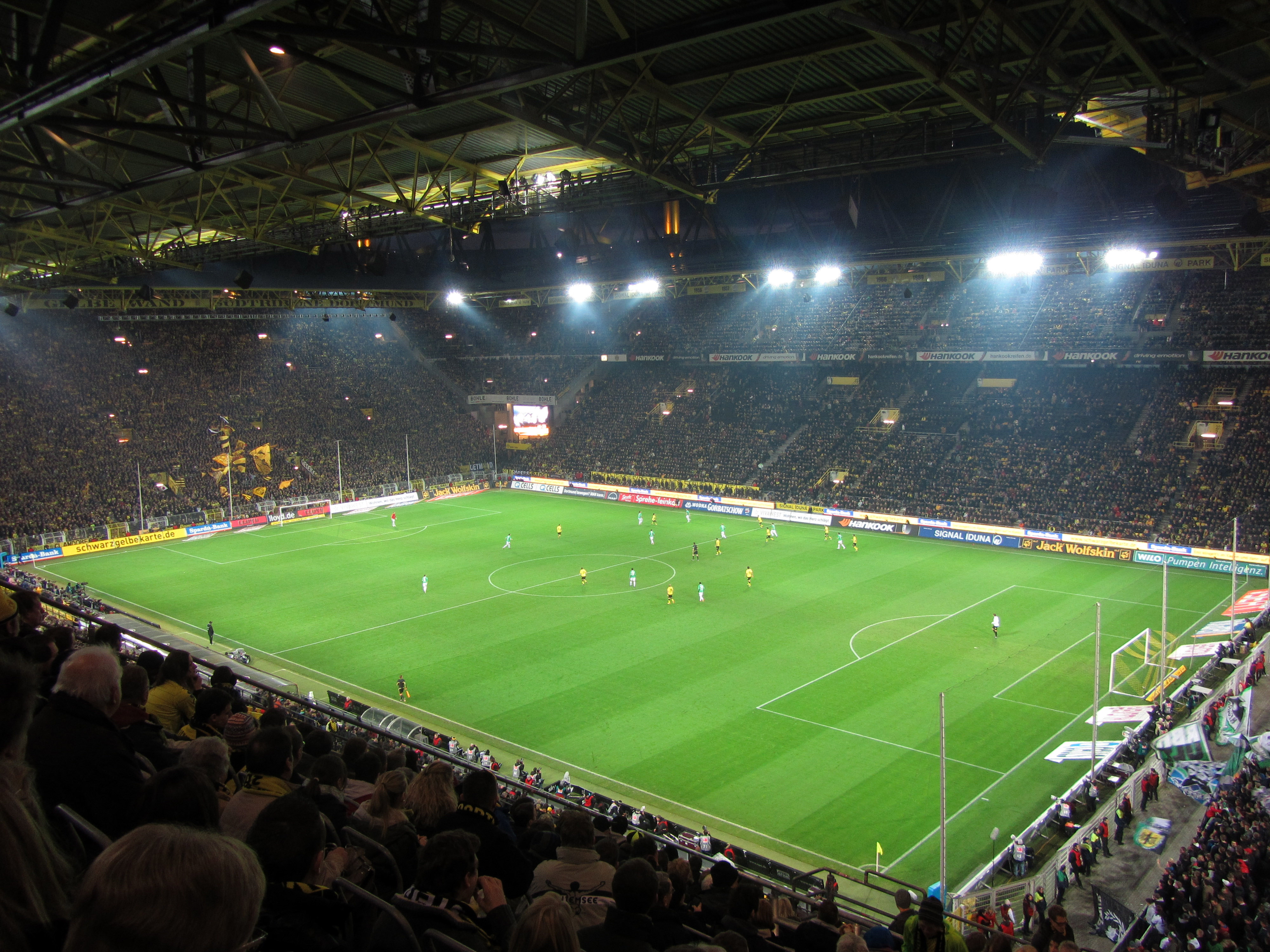
The Bundesliga has the highest average attendance of any football league in the world. Borussia Dortmund has the highest average attendance at Signal Iduna Park of any football club in the world.

The spectator figures for league for the last ten seasons:

Bundesliga Spectator Statistics
Season	Overall	Average	Best supported club	Average
2011–12	13,805,514	45,116	Borussia Dortmund	80,521
2012–13	13,042,263	42,622	Borussia Dortmund	80,520
2013–14	13,311,145	43,500	Borussia Dortmund	80,297
2014–15	13,323,031	43,539	Borussia Dortmund	80,463
2015–16	13,249,778	43,300	Borussia Dortmund	81,178
2016–17	12,703,167	41,514	Borussia Dortmund	79,653
2017–18	13,661,796	44,646	Borussia Dortmund	79,496
2018–19	13,298,147	43,458	Borussia Dortmund	80,820
2019–20	9,112,950	29,781	Bayern Munich	57,353
2020–21	163,705	535	Borussia Dortmund	1,282
2021–22	4,641,988	21,039	Borussia Dortmund	41,789
2022–23	13,147,701	42,966	Borussia Dortmund	81,228
2023–24	12,090,797	39,512	Borussia Dortmund	81,305
2024–25	11,828,684	38,656	Borussia Dortmund	81,365
2025–26	12,947,047	41,483	Borussia Dortmund	81,285

== Media coverage ==
=== Domestic ===
The Bundesliga TV, radio, internet, and mobile broadcast rights are distributed by DFL Sports Enterprises, a subsidiary of the Deutsche Fußball Liga. The Bundesliga broadcast rights are sold along with the broadcast rights to the relegation playoffs, 2. Bundesliga and DFL-Supercup.

Bundesliga matches are broadcast on TV in Germany on Sky Deutschland and DAZN. Three Friday night matches – the openers of the first and second halves of the season, and on the final matchday before the winter break – are broadcast free-to-air on Sat. 1.

After RTL Group acquired Sky Deutschland in 2026, it reached an agreement with the Bundesliga to simulcast ten matches per season free-to-air on RTL.

Day	Time (CET)	Broadcaster
Friday	20:30	Sky Sport Bundesliga; Sat.1 (1st, 17th, and 18th matchdays) (1 match)
Saturday	15:30	Sky Sport Bundesliga (5 matches) (4 matches in case of a third game on sunday)
Saturday	15:30	DAZN (Konferenz of 4 or 5 matches)
Saturday	18:30	Sky Sport Bundesliga (1 match)
Sunday	15:30	DAZN (1 match)
Sunday	17:30	DAZN (1 match)
Sunday	19:30	DAZN (1 match on 5 matchdays)

Radio coverage includes the national Konferenz (whip-around coverage) on the stations of ARD and full match coverage on local radio stations.

=== Global ===
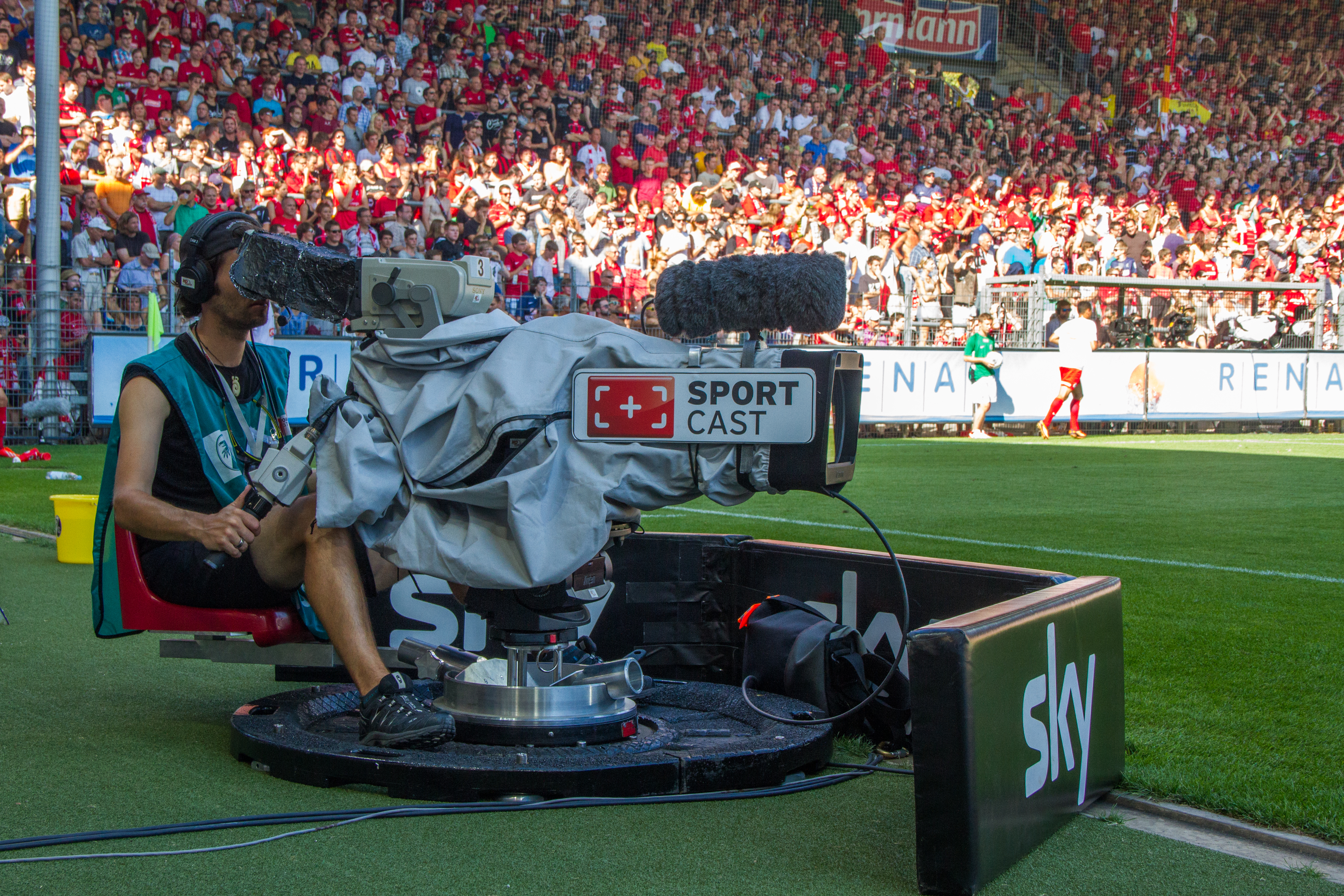
The Bundesliga is broadcast on TV in over 200 countries.

The Bundesliga is broadcast on TV in over 200 countries. Versant (via USA Sports) would hold English rights in the United States starting with the beginning of the 2026–27 season. At least 30 matches per season are reserved for linear television on the USA Network, with all remaining games appearing on Fandango. NBCUniversal (via Telemundo Deportes) will hold the Spanish rights starting that same season, with a few matches per week airing on Telemundo and Universo and all matches streaming on Peacock. ESPN held both the English and Spanish rights from the beginning of the 2020–21 season to the end of the 2025–26 season. 4 matches per season were reserved for linear television with the rest appearing on ESPN+. In Canada, the Bundesliga is broadcast live on OneSoccer.

In the United Kingdom and in Ireland, the Bundesliga is broadcast live on Sky Sports. Also in the United Kingdom, the BBC have the rights to broadcast one match a week from August 2025 until 2027. In Spain, the Bundesliga is broadcast live on DAZN.

In Indonesia, Bundesliga is aired on MNC Group's television channels, pay TV, and OTT (Note: replacing ANTV, tvOne and Mola that expired two seasons ago) in the 2024–25 season while it was currently unavailable on beIN Sports Asia in the country since the previous season. In the 2025–26 season, the broadcasting rights contract is extended. In Vietnam, Bundesliga is aired on TV360 from 2025–26 season.

Taiwan's ELTA TV are expecting to aired Bundesliga for the 2024–25 season, marked the first time Bundesliga returned to Taiwanese television since the 2020–21 season.

In 2015, digital TV operator StarTimes acquired exclusive television rights for Sub-Saharan Africa for five years starting from 2015–16 season.

In August 2025, MBC Group signed a three-year deal to broadcast all Bundesliga games on Shahid and three matches a week on free-to-air (FTA) channel MBC Action across the MENA. That same month, English YouTuber Mark Goldbridge secured rights to stream the 2025–26 season on his channel "That's Football", alongside another YouTube channel "The Overlap", while the BBC, Sky Sports, Amazon Prime Video, and Bundesliga's official YouTube channel also acquired UK and Ireland broadcast rights. In August 2026, former England forward Jamie Vardy became a Bundesliga rights holder, with his YouTube channel, "Jamie Vardy's Having a Party", set to broadcast seven Friday-night matches during the 2026–27 season.

== Champions ==
In total, 13 clubs have won the bundesliga, not including the former German championship titles won before the Bundesliga's inception and those in the East German Oberliga. The record champions are Bayern Munich with 34 titles.

=== List of champions ===
Season	Champions
1963–64	1. FC Köln
1964–65	Werder Bremen
1965–66	1860 Munich
1966–67	Eintracht Braunschweig
1967–68	1. FC Nürnberg
1968–69	Bayern Munich
1969–70	Borussia Mönchengladbach
1970–71	Borussia Mönchengladbach
1971–72	Bayern Munich
1972–73	Bayern Munich
1973–74	Bayern Munich
1974–75	Borussia Mönchengladbach
1975–76	Borussia Mönchengladbach
1976–77	Borussia Mönchengladbach
1977–78	1. FC Köln
1978–79	Hamburger SV
1979–80	Bayern Munich
1980–81	Bayern Munich
1981–82	Hamburger SV
1982–83	Hamburger SV
1983–84	VfB Stuttgart
1984–85	Bayern Munich
1985–86	Bayern Munich
1986–87	Bayern Munich
1987–88	Werder Bremen
1988–89	Bayern Munich
1989–90	Bayern Munich
1990–91	1. FC Kaiserslautern
1991–92	VfB Stuttgart
1992–93	Werder Bremen
1993–94	Bayern Munich
1994–95	Borussia Dortmund
1995–96	Borussia Dortmund
1996–97	Bayern Munich
1997–98	1. FC Kaiserslautern
1998–99	Bayern Munich
1999–2000	Bayern Munich
2000–01	Bayern Munich
2001–02	Borussia Dortmund
2002–03	Bayern Munich
2003–04	Werder Bremen
2004–05	Bayern Munich
2005–06	Bayern Munich
2006–07	VfB Stuttgart
2007–08	Bayern Munich
2008–09	VfL Wolfsburg
2009–10	Bayern Munich
2010–11	Borussia Dortmund
2011–12	Borussia Dortmund
2012–13	Bayern Munich
2013–14	Bayern Munich
2014–15	Bayern Munich
2015–16	Bayern Munich
2016–17	Bayern Munich
2017–18	Bayern Munich
2018–19	Bayern Munich
2019–20	Bayern Munich
2020–21	Bayern Munich
2021–22	Bayern Munich
2022–23	Bayern Munich
2023–24	Bayer Leverkusen
2024–25	Bayern Munich
2025–26	Bayern Munich

=== Performance by club ===
Clubs in bold play in 2026–27 season in the top division. The German championship winners and DDR-Oberliga winners are not included in table below.

Club	Winners	Runners-up	Winning seasons	Runners-up seasons
**Bayern Munich**	34	10	1968–69, 1971–72, 1972–73, 1973–74, 1979–80, 1980–81, 1984–85, 1985–86, 1986–87, 1988–89, 1989–90, 1993–94, 1996–97, 1998–99, 1999–2000, 2000–01, 2002–03, 2004–05, 2005–06, 2007–08, 2009–10, 2012–13, 2013–14, 2014–15, 2015–16, 2016–17, 2017–18, 2018–19, 2019–20, 2020–21, 2021–22, 2022–23, 2024–25, 2025–26	1969–70, 1970–71, 1987–88, 1990–91, 1992–93, 1995–96, 1997–98, 2003–04, 2008–09, 2011–12
**Borussia Dortmund**	5	9	1994–95, 1995–96, 2001–02, 2010–11, 2011–12	1965–66, 1991–92, 2012–13, 2013–14, 2015–16, 2018–19, 2019–20, 2021–22, 2022–23, 2025–26
**Borussia Mönchengladbach**	5	2	1969–70, 1970–71, 1974–75, 1975–76, 1976–77	1973–74, 1977–78
**Werder Bremen**	4	7	1964–65, 1987–88, 1992–93, 2003–04	1967–68, 1982–83, 1984–85, 1985–86, 1994–95, 2005–06, 2007–08
**Hamburger SV**	3	5	1978–79, 1981–82, 1982–83	1975–76, 1979–80, 1980–81, 1983–84, 1986–87
**VfB Stuttgart**	3	3	1983–84, 1991–92, 2006–07	1978–79, 2002–03, 2023–24
**1. FC Köln**	2	5	1963–64, 1977–78	1964–65, 1972–73, 1981–82, 1988–89, 1989–90
1. FC Kaiserslautern	2	1	1990–91, 1997–98	1993–94
**Bayer Leverkusen**	1	6	2023–24	1996–97, 1998–99, 1999–2000, 2001–02, 2010–11, 2024–25
1860 Munich	1	1	1965–66	1966–67
VfL Wolfsburg	1	1	2008–09	2014–15
Eintracht Braunschweig	1	—	1966–67	
1. FC Nürnberg	1	—	1967–68	
**Schalke 04**	—	7		1971–72, 1976–77, 2000–01, 2004–05, 2006–07, 2009–10, 2017–18
**RB Leipzig**	—	2		2016–17, 2020–21
MSV Duisburg	—	1		1963–64
Alemannia Aachen	—	1		1968–69
Hertha BSC	—	1		1974–75

=== Honours ===
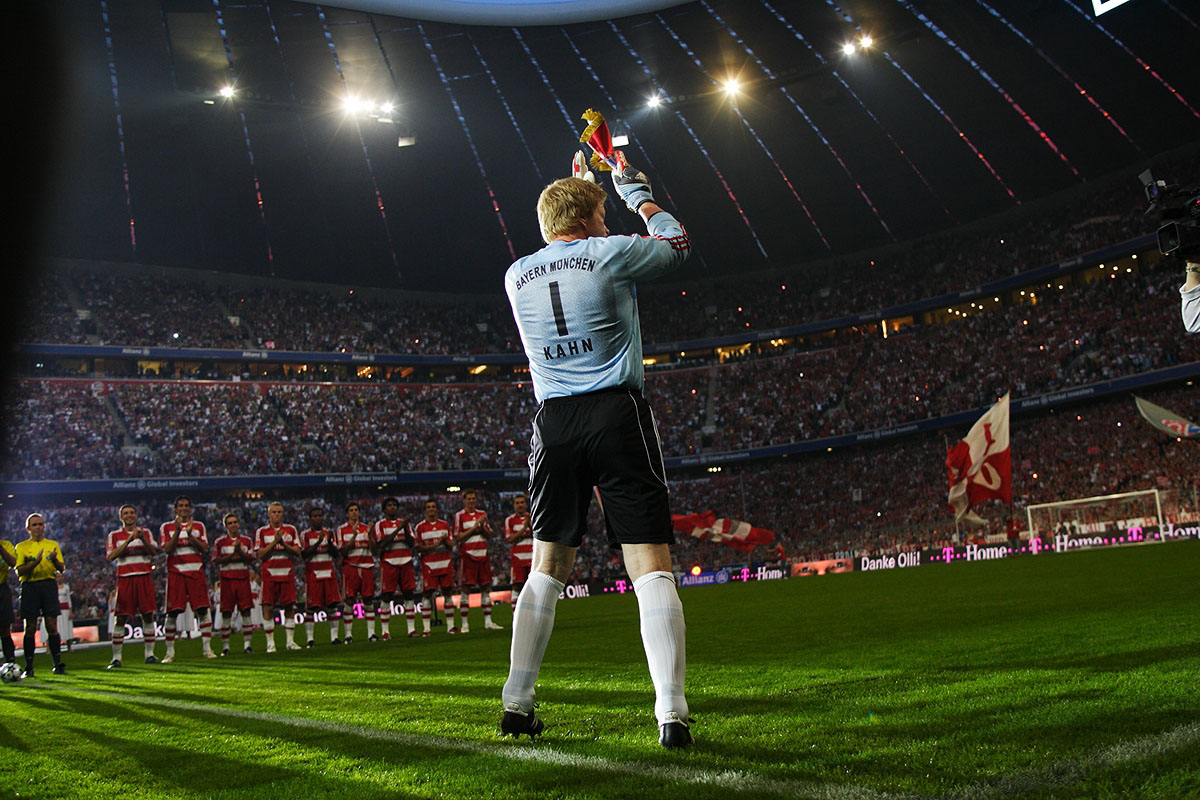
Oliver Kahn won eight Bundesliga championships.

In 2004, the honour of "Verdiente Meistervereine" (roughly "distinguished champion clubs") was introduced, following a custom first practised in Italy to recognize sides that have won three or more championships since 1963 by the display of gold stars on their team badges and jerseys. Each country's usage is unique, with the following rules applying in Germany:

- 3 Bundesliga titles: 1 star
- 5 Bundesliga titles: 2 stars
- 10 Bundesliga titles: 3 stars
- 20 Bundesliga titles: 4 stars
- 30 Bundesliga titles: 5 stars

The former East German side BFC Dynamo laid claim to the three stars of a 10-time champion. The club asked for equal rights and petitioned the DFL and the DFB to have their DDR-Oberliga titles recognized. BFC Dynamo received support from SG Dynamo Dresden and 1. FC Magdeburg in its attempts to achieve recognition for East German titles. The DFL eventually answered that it was not the responsible body and pointed to the DFB, but the DFB remained silent for long time. BFC Dynamo eventually took matters into their own hands and emblazoned its jerseys with three stars, while a decision was still pending. This caused some debate because the club had been the favorite club of Erich Mielke during the East German era. There were rumours that the ten titles won by the club were also due to alleged manipulation of the game by Erich Mielke, while there is no proof that referees stood under direct instructions from the Stasi and no document has ever been found in the archives that gave the Stasi a mandate to bribe referees. In an interview with the Leipziger Volkszeitung in 2017, former East German referee Bernd Heynemann concluded: "The BFC is not ten times champions because the referees only whistled for Dynamo. They were already strong as a bear." Critics in the DFB environment pointed to politically influenced championships in East Germany. BFC Dynamo had been supported by the Stasi and had been advantaged. The club had enjoyed privileged access to talents and access to a permanent training camp at Uckley in Königs Wusterhausen. However, also other clubs in East Germany had enjoyed similar advantages, which put the DFB in a difficult situation. Former East German referee and then CDU parliamentarian Bernd Heynemann spoke out for recognition of all East German titles. The issue of recognition for titles outside the Bundesliga also affected pre-Bundesliga champions, such as Hertha BSC. The DFB finally decided in November 2005 to allow all former champions to display a single star inscribed with the number of titles, including all German men's titles since 1903, women's titles since 1974 and East German titles.

The DFB format only applies to teams playing below the Bundesliga (below the top two divisions), since the DFL conventions apply in the Bundesliga. Greuther Fürth unofficially display three (silver) stars for pre-war titles in spite of being in the Bundesliga. These stars are a permanent part of their crest. However, Fürth has to leave the stars out of their jersey.

Since June 2010, the following clubs have been officially allowed to wear stars while playing in the Bundesliga. The number in parentheses is for Bundesliga titles won.

- Bayern Munich (34)
- Borussia Dortmund (5)
- Borussia Mönchengladbach (5)
- Werder Bremen (4)
- Hamburger SV (3)
- VfB Stuttgart (3)

In addition, a system of one star designation was adopted for use. This system is intended to take into account not only Bundesliga titles but also other (now defunct) national championships. As of July 2014, the following clubs are allowed to wear one star while playing outside the Bundesliga. The number in parentheses is for total league championships won over the course of German football history, and would be displayed within the star. Some teams listed here had different names while winning their respective championships, these names are also noted in parentheses.

- Bayern Munich* (35)
- BFC Dynamo (10)
- 1. FC Nürnberg** (9)
- Borussia Dortmund* (8)
- Dynamo Dresden** (8)
- Schalke 04* (7)
- Hamburger SV** (7) (1921–22, Title declined per DFB)
- 1. FC Frankfurt (as ASK Vorwärts Berlin and FC Vorwärts Berlin in the DDR-Oberliga) (6)
- VfB Stuttgart* (5)
- Borussia Mönchengladbach* (5)
- Werder Bremen* (4)
- 1. FC Kaiserslautern** (4)
- FC Erzgebirge Aue*** (include 1955 DDR-Oberliga unofficial fall championship) (as SC Wismut Karl-Marx-Stadt) (4)
- FC Carl Zeiss Jena (3)
- 1. FC Köln* (3)
- 1. FC Lokomotive Leipzig (as VfB Leipzig) (3)
- 1. FC Magdeburg** (3)
- Greuther Fürth** (3)
- Hertha BSC** (2)
- FC Viktoria 1889 Berlin (as Berliner TuFC Viktoria 89)*** (2)
- FC Rot-Weiß Erfurt (as BSG Turbine Erfurt and SC Turbine Erfurt in the DDR-Oberliga) (2)
- Dresdner SC (2)
- BSG Chemie Leipzig (as BSG Chemie Leipzig in the DDR-Oberliga) (2)
- Hannover 96** (2)
- FSV Zwickau*** (as ZSG Horch Zwickau in the DDR-Oberliga) (2)
- Turbine Halle (as BSG Turbine Halle in the DDR-Oberliga) (2)
- Hansa Rostock** (in the DDR-Oberliga) (1)
- Karlsruher FV (1)
- Holstein Kiel** (1)
- 1860 Munich*** (1)
- Blau-Weiß 1890 Berlin (as Union 92 Berlin) (1)
- Karlsruher SC** (1)
- Fortuna Düsseldorf** (1)
- Eintracht Frankfurt* (1)
- VfL Wolfsburg* (1)
- Bayer Leverkusen* (1)
- Chemnitzer FC (as FC Karl-Marx-Stadt in the DDR-Oberliga) (1)
- Freiburger FC (1)
- VfR Mannheim (1)
- Rot-Weiss Essen*** (1)
- Eintracht Braunschweig** (1)

* currently member of 1. Bundesliga
** currently member of 2. Bundesliga
*** currently member of 3. Liga

== Logo history ==
For the first time in 1996, the Bundesliga was given its own logo to distinguish itself. Six years later, the logo was revamped into a portrait orientation, which was used until 2010. A new logo was announced for the 2010–11 season in order to modernise the brand logo for all media platforms. To celebrate the 50th anniversary of the Bundesliga, a special logo was developed for the 2012–13 season, featuring a "50" and "1963–2013". Following the season, the 2010 logo was restored. In December 2016, it was announced that a new logo would be used for the 2017–18 season, modified slightly for digitisation requirements, featuring a matte look.

== Influence and criticism ==
Former England international Owen Hargreaves hailed the Bundesliga alongside Pep Guardiola for its positive impact on nurturing young talents, noting that the Bundesliga is the best league in the world to promote young footballers. Many young English talents have sought refuge in Germany in order to regain fitness and football skills. Outside Europe, the J.League of Japan, which was founded in 1992, was strongly influenced by the philosophy of the Bundesliga. Since then, the J.League has managed to establish itself as one of the best football leagues in Asia, in which it shares a beneficial relationship with its German exemplar.

The Bundesliga has earned praise for its reputation on good financial management and the physical fitness of players.

The Bundesliga outperformed the English Premier League in 2017 in online influence in China, having been accredited for its open embrace of live-streaming and fast-forward visions.

The Bundesliga has at times been criticised for a perceived lack of competitiveness due to the continued dominance of FC Bayern Munich. The club has won a record 34 titles (of 61 available) in the modern Bundesliga era since 1963; a greater level of success than that of all their rivals combined. Indeed, the Bavarian club won 11 consecutive titles between the 2012–13 season and the 2022–23 season. Former Germany international Stefan Effenberg has suggested that the league be restructured in order to end Bayern's dominance.

== Records ==
=== Appearances ===
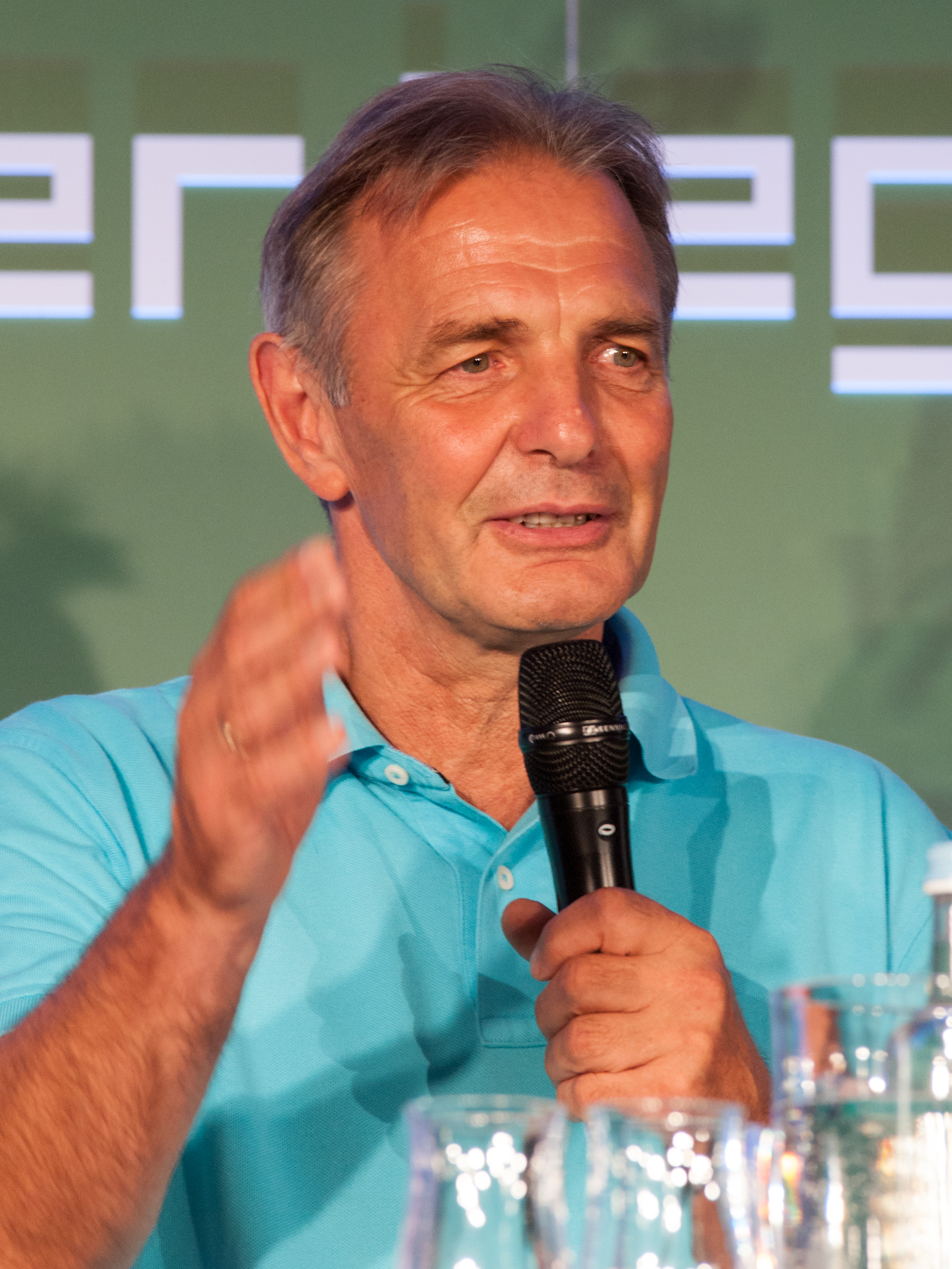
Charly Körbel

As of 21 August 2026

Top ten players with most appearances
Rank	Player	Apps	Years	Club(s)
1	(Germany) Charly Körbel	602	1972–1991	Eintracht Frankfurt 602
2	(Germany) Manfred Kaltz	581	1971–1991	Hamburger SV 581
3	(Germany) Oliver Kahn	557	1987–2008	Karlsruher SC 128, Bayern Munich 429
4	(Germany) Klaus Fichtel	552	1965–1988	Schalke 04 477, Werder Bremen 75
5	(Germany) Miroslav Votava	546	1976–1996	Borussia Dortmund 189, Werder Bremen 357
6	(Germany) **Manuel Neuer**	545	2006–	Schalke 04 156, Bayern Munich 388
7	(Germany) Klaus Fischer	535	1968–1988	1860 Munich 60, Schalke 04 295, 1. FC Köln 96, VfL Bochum 84
8	(Germany) Eike Immel	534	1978–1995	Borussia Dortmund 247, VfB Stuttgart 287
9	(Germany) **Oliver Baumann**	523	2010–	SC Freiburg 131, TSG Hoffenheim 387
10	(Germany) Willi Neuberger	520	1966–1983	Borussia Dortmund 148, Werder Bremen 63, Wuppertaler SV 42, Eintracht Frankfurt 267

Boldface indicates a player still active in the Bundesliga.

=== Top scorers ===
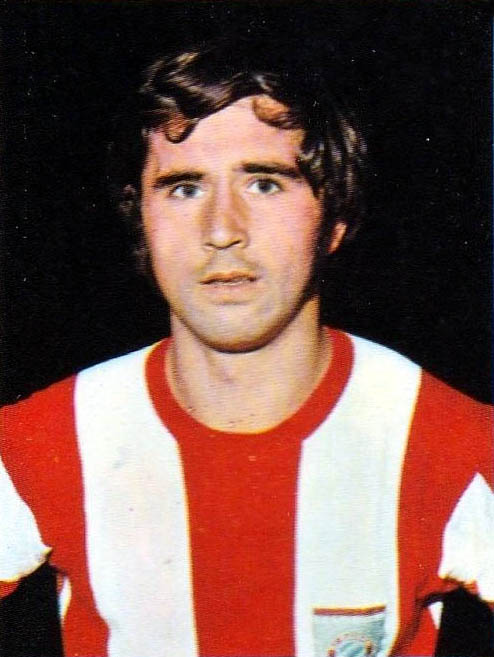
Gerd Müller

As of 7 June 2025

Top ten goalscorers
Rank	Player	Goals	Apps	Ratio	Years	Club(s)
1	(Germany) Gerd Müller	365	427	0.85	1965–1979	Bayern Munich 365/427
2	(Poland) Robert Lewandowski	312	384	0.82	2010–2022	Dortmund 74/131, Bayern Munich 238/253
3	(Germany) Klaus Fischer	268	535	0.50	1968–1988	1860 Munich 28/60, Schalke 04 182/295, 1. FC Köln 31/96, VfL Bochum 27/84
4	(Germany) Jupp Heynckes	220	369	0.60	1965–1978	Borussia Mönchengladbach 195/283, Hannover 96 25/86
5	(Germany) Manfred Burgsmüller	213	447	0.48	1969–1990	Rot-Weiss Essen 32/74, Borussia Dortmund 135/224, 1. FC Nürnberg 12/34, SV Werder Bremen 34/115
6	(Peru) Claudio Pizarro	197	490	0.40	1999–2020	Werder Bremen 109/250, Bayern Munich 87/224, 1. FC Köln 1/16
7	(Germany) Ulf Kirsten	181	350	0.52	1990–2003	Bayer Leverkusen 181/350
8	(Germany) Stefan Kuntz	179	449	0.40	1983–1999	VfL Bochum 47/120, KFC Uerdingen 32/94, 1. FC Kaiserslautern 75/170, Arminia Bielefeld 25/65
9	(Germany) Dieter Müller	177	303	0.58	1973–1986	Offenbach 0/2, 1. FC Köln 159/248, VfB Stuttgart 14/30, 1. FC Saarbrücken 4/23
9	(Germany) Klaus Allofs	177	424	0.42	1975–1993	Fortuna Düsseldorf 71/169, 1. FC Köln 88/177, Werder Bremen 18/78

== See also ==
- DFL (operator of the league)
- Promotion to the Bundesliga
- All-time Bundesliga table
- List of foreign Bundesliga players
- List of football clubs in Germany by major honours won
- List of attendance figures at domestic professional sports leagues – the Bundesliga in a worldwide context
- German football clubs in European competitions
- UAE German Supercup
- 90elf – defunct German internet radio station that covered Bundesliga matches
