= German football clubs in European competitions =

- Points by season (UEFA coefficient)
Season	Points
1998–99	6.357
1999–2000	11.071
2000–01	11.062
2001–02	13.500
2002–03	9.142
2003–04	4.714
2004–05	10.571
2005–06	10.437
2006–07	9.500
2007–08	13.500
2008–09	12.687
2009–10	18.083
2010–11	15.666
2011–12	15.250
2012–13	17.928
2013–14	14.714
2014–15	15.857
2015–16	16.428
2016–17	14.571
2017–18	9.857
2018–19	15.214
2019–20	18.714
2020–21	15.214
2021–22	16.214
2022–23	17.125
2023–24	19.357
2024–25	18.421
2025–26	21.785

German football clubs hold the fourth place in UEFA ranking and are represented by four clubs in the UEFA Champions League, two clubs in the UEFA Europa League and one club in the UEFA Conference League. Over the last few years German football has risen, and that can be confirmed from the appearance of two German clubs in the final of the 2012–13 Champions League. German football has won interest in all of Europe because the majority of associations are financially healthy and the number of spectators in stadiums has been rising.

During the first years of European competitions, Germany was divided into West and East Germany, so initially German football was represented by two countries and two different championships, the Bundesliga and the DDR-Oberliga. After the German reunification in October 1990, the Bundesliga became the league for all of Germany. West German football clubs have entered European association football competitions since the 1955–56 season, when Rot-Weiss Essen took part in European Cup competition. East German football clubs entered European association football competitions two years later, since the 1957–58 season, when FC Erzgebirge Aue took part in European Cup competition.

So far, German clubs have won the Champions League/European Cup eight times (Bayern, Dortmund and Hamburg), the Europa League/UEFA Cup seven times (Mönchengladbach, Bayern, Eintracht Frankfurt, Leverkusen, Schalke), the UEFA Cup Winners' Cup five times (Bayern, Bremen, Dortmund, Hamburg, Magdeburg), the UEFA Super Cup twice (Bayern) and the UEFA Intertoto Cup nine times (Karlsruhe, Schalke, Stuttgart, Bremen, Hamburg and Hertha).

== Finals and cups ==
=== Champions League / European Cup ===
Club	Won	Runner-up	Years won	Years runner-up
Bayern Munich	6	5	1974, 1975, 1976, 2001, 2013, 2020	1982, 1987, 1999, 2010, 2012
Borussia Dortmund	1	2	1997	2013, 2024
Hamburger SV	1	1	1983	1980
Eintracht Frankfurt	0	1	—	1960
Borussia Mönchengladbach	0	1	—	1977
Bayer Leverkusen	0	1	—	2002

=== Europa League / UEFA Cup ===
Team	Winners	Runners-up	Years won	Years runner-up
Borussia Mönchengladbach	2	2	1975, 1979	1973, 1980
Eintracht Frankfurt	2	0	1980, 2022	—
Bayer Leverkusen	1	1	1988	2024
Bayern Munich	1	0	1996	—
Schalke 04	1	0	1997	—
Borussia Dortmund	0	2	—	1993, 2002
Hamburger SV	0	1	—	1982
1. FC Köln	0	1	—	1986
VfB Stuttgart	0	1	—	1989
Werder Bremen	0	1	—	2009
SC Freiburg	0	1	—	2026

=== UEFA Cup Winners' Cup ===
Team	Winners	Runners-up	Years won	Years runners-up
Hamburger SV	1	1	1977	1968
Borussia Dortmund	1	0	1966	—
Bayern Munich	1	0	1967	—
1. FC Magdeburg (East Germany)	1	0	1974	—
Werder Bremen	1	0	1992	—
1860 Munich	0	1	—	1965
Fortuna Düsseldorf	0	1	—	1979
Carl Zeiss Jena (East Germany)	0	1	—	1981
Lokomotive Leipzig (East Germany)	0	1	—	1987
VfB Stuttgart	0	1	—	1998

=== European Super Cup / UEFA Super Cup ===
Team	Winners	Runners-up	Years won	Years runner-up
Bayern Munich	2	3	2013, 2020	1975, 1976, 2001
Hamburger SV	0	2	—	1977, 1983
Werder Bremen	0	1	—	1992
Borussia Dortmund	0	1	—	1997
Eintracht Frankfurt	0	1	—	2022

=== Worldwide competitions ===
==== Intercontinental Cup ====
Team	Winners	Runners-up	Years won	Years runner-up
Bayern Munich	2	0	1976, 2001	—
Borussia Dortmund	1	0	1997	—
Borussia Mönchengladbach	0	1	—	1977
Hamburger SV	0	1	—	1983

==== FIFA Club World Cup ====
Team	Winners	Runners-up	Years won	Years runner-up
Bayern Munich	2	0	2013, 2020	—

== Full European record ==
=== UEFA Champions League/European Cup ===
After German reunification

Season	Team	Progress	Score	Opponents	Venue(s)
1992–93	VfB Stuttgart	First round	4–4^{a}	(England) Leeds United	3–0 home, 1–4 away
1993–94	Werder Bremen	3rd in Group Stage	N/A	(Italy) Milan, (Portugal) Porto, (Belgium) Anderlecht	
1994–95	Bayern Munich	Semi-finals	2–5	(Netherlands) Ajax	0–0 home, 2–5 away
1995–96	Borussia Dortmund	Quarter-finals	0–3	(Netherlands) Ajax	0–2 home, 0–1 away
1996–97	Borussia Dortmund	Winners	3–1	(Italy) Juventus	
1997–98	Bayern Munich	Quarter-finals	0–1	(Germany) Borussia Dortmund	0–0 home, 0–1 away
1997–98	Bayer Leverkusen	Quarter-finals	1–4	(Spain) Real Madrid	1–1 home, 0–3 away
1997–98	Borussia Dortmund	Semi-finals	0–2	(Spain) Real Madrid	0–0 home, 0–2 away
1998–99	Kaiserslautern	Quarter-finals	0–6	(Germany) Bayern Munich	0–2 home, 0–4 away
1998–99	Bayern Munich	Final	1–2	(England) Manchester United	
1999–2000	Bayern Munich	Semi-finals	2–3	(Spain) Real Madrid	2–1 home, 0–2 away
1999–2000	Bayer Leverkusen	3rd in first Group Stage	N/A	(Italy) Lazio, (Ukraine) Dynamo Kyiv, (Slovenia) Maribor	
1999–2000	Hertha BSC	4th in second Group Stage	N/A	(Spain) Barcelona, (Portugal) Porto, (Czech Republic) Sparta Prague	
1999–2000	Borussia Dortmund	3rd in first Group Stage	N/A	(Norway) Rosenborg, (Netherlands) Feyenoord, (Portugal) Boavista	
2000–01	Bayern Munich	Winners	1–1 (3–1 p)	(Spain) Valencia	
2000–01	Bayer Leverkusen	3rd in first Group Stage	N/A	(Spain) Real Madrid, (Russia) Spartak Moscow, (Portugal) Sporting CP	
2000–01	Hamburger SV	3rd in first Group Stage	N/A	(Spain) Deportivo La Coruña, (Greece) Panathinaikos, (Italy) Juventus	
2000–01	1860 Munich	Third qualifying round	1–3	(England) Leeds United	0–1 home, 1–2 away
2001–02	Bayern Munich	Quarter-finals	2–3	(Spain) Real Madrid	2–1 home, 0–2 away
2001–02	Schalke 04	4th in first Group Stage	N/A	(Greece) Panathinaikos, (England) Liverpool, (Spain) Mallorca	
2001–02	Borussia Dortmund	3rd in first Group Stage	N/A	(England) Liverpool, (Portugal) Boavista, (Ukraine) Dynamo Kyiv	
2001–02	Bayer Leverkusen	Final	1–2	(Spain) Real Madrid	
2002–03	Borussia Dortmund	3rd in second Group Stage	N/A	(Italy) Milan, (Spain) Real Madrid, (Russia) Lokomotiv Moscow	
2002–03	Bayer Leverkusen	4th in second Group Stage	N/A	(Spain) Barcelona, (Italy) Internazionale, (England) Newcastle United	
2002–03	Bayern Munich	4th in first Group Stage	N/A	(Italy) Milan, (Spain) Deportivo La Coruña, (France) Lens	
2003–04	Bayern Munich	Round of 16	1–2	(Spain) Real Madrid	1–1 home, 0–1 away
2003–04	VfB Stuttgart	Round of 16	0–1	(England) Chelsea	0–1 home, 0–0 away
2003–04	Borussia Dortmund	Third qualifying round	3–3 (2–4 p)	(Belgium) Club Brugge	2–1 home, 1–2 away
2004–05	Werder Bremen	Round of 16	2–10	(France) Lyon	0–3 home, 2–7 away
2004–05	Bayern Munich	Quarter-finals	5–6	(England) Chelsea	3–2 home, 2–4 away
2004–05	Bayer Leverkusen	Round of 16	2–6	(England) Liverpool	1–3 home, 1–3 away
2005–06	Bayern Munich	Round of 16	2–5	(Italy) Milan	1–1 home, 1–4 away
2005–06	Schalke 04	3rd in Group Stage	N/A	(Italy) Milan, (Netherlands) PSV Eindhoven, (Turkey) Fenerbahçe	
2005–06	Werder Bremen	Round of 16	4–4	(Italy) Juventus	3–2 home, 1–2 away
2006–07	Bayern Munich	Quarter-finals	2–4	(Italy) Milan	0–2 home, 2–2 away
2006–07	Werder Bremen	3rd in Group Stage	N/A	(England) Chelsea, (Spain) Barcelona, (Bulgaria) Levski Sofia	
2006–07	Hamburger SV	4th in Group Stage	N/A	(England) Arsenal, (Portugal) Porto, (Russia) CSKA Moscow	
2007–08	VfB Stuttgart	4th in Group Stage	N/A	(Spain) Barcelona, (France) Lyon, (Scotland) Rangers	
2007–08	Schalke 04	Quarter-finals	0–2	(Spain) Barcelona	0–1 home, 0–1 away
2007–08	Werder Bremen	3rd in Group Stage	N/A	(Spain) Real Madrid, (Greece) Olympiacos, (Italy) Lazio	
2008–09	Bayern Munich	Quarter-finals	1–5	(Spain) Barcelona	1–1 home, 0–4 away
2008–09	Werder Bremen	3rd in Group Stage	N/A	(Greece) Panathinaikos, (Italy) Internazionale, (Cyprus) Anorthosis	
2008–09	Schalke 04	Third qualifying round	1–4	(Spain) Atlético Madrid	1–0 home, 0–4 away
2009–10	Bayern Munich	Final	0–2	(Italy) Internazionale	
2009–10	VfL Wolfsburg	3rd in Group Stage	N/A	(England) Manchester United, (Russia) CSKA Moscow, (Turkey) Beşiktaş	
2009–10	VfB Stuttgart	Round of 16	1–5	(Spain) Barcelona	1–1 home, 0–4 away
2010–11	Bayern Munich	Round of 16	3–3	(Italy) Internazionale	2–3 home, 1–0 away
2010–11	Schalke 04	Semi-finals	1–6	(England) Manchester United	0–2 home, 1–4 away
2010–11	Werder Bremen	4th in Group Stage	N/A	(England) Tottenham Hotspur, (Italy) Internazionale, (Netherlands) Twente	
2011–12	Bayern Munich	Final	1–1 (3–4 p)	(England) Chelsea	
2011–12	Borussia Dortmund	4th in Group Stage	N/A	(England) Arsenal, (France) Marseille, (Greece) Olympiacos	
2011–12	Bayer Leverkusen	Round of 16	2–10	(Spain) Barcelona	1–3 home, 1–7 away
2012–13	Bayern Munich	Winners	2–1	(Germany) Borussia Dortmund	
2012–13	Borussia Dortmund	Final	1–2	(Germany) Bayern Munich	
2012–13	Schalke 04	Round of 16	3–4	(Turkey) Galatasaray	2–3 home, 1–1 away
2012–13	Borussia Mönchengladbach	Play-off round	3–3	(Ukraine) Dynamo Kyiv	1–3 home, 2–1 away
2013–14	Bayern Munich	Semi-finals	0–5	(Spain) Real Madrid	0–4 home, 0–1 away
2013–14	Borussia Dortmund	Quarter-finals	2–3	(Spain) Real Madrid	2–0 home, 0–3 away
2013–14	Schalke 04	Round of 16	2–9	(Spain) Real Madrid	1–6 home, 1–3 away
2013–14	Bayer Leverkusen	Round of 16	1–6	(France) Paris Saint-Germain	0–4 home, 1–2 away
2014–15	Bayern Munich	Semi-finals	3–5	(Spain) Barcelona	3–2 home, 0–3 away
2014–15	Borussia Dortmund	Round of 16	1–5	(Italy) Juventus	1–2 home, 0–3 away
2014–15	Schalke 04	Round of 16	4–5	(Spain) Real Madrid	0–2 home, 4–3 away
2014–15	Bayer Leverkusen	Round of 16	1–1 (2–3 p)	(Spain) Atlético Madrid	1–0 home, 0–1 away
2015–16	Bayern Munich	Semi-finals	2–2	(Spain) Atlético Madrid	2–1 home, 0–1 away
2015–16	VfL Wolfsburg	Quarter-finals	2–3	(Spain) Real Madrid	2–0 home, 0–3 away
2015–16	Bayer Leverkusen	3rd in Group Stage	N/A	(Spain) Barcelona, (Italy) Roma, (Belarus) BATE Borisov	
2015–16	Borussia Mönchengladbach	4th in Group Stage	N/A	(England) Manchester City, (Italy) Juventus, (Spain) Sevilla	
2016–17	Bayern Munich	Quarter-finals	3–6	(Spain) Real Madrid	1–2 home, 2–4 away
2016–17	Borussia Dortmund	Quarter-finals	3–6	(France) Monaco	2–3 home, 1–3 away
2016–17	Bayer Leverkusen	Round of 16	2–4	(Spain) Atlético Madrid	2–4 home, 0–0 away
2016–17	Borussia Mönchengladbach	3rd in Group Stage	N/A	(Spain) Barcelona, (England) Manchester City, (Scotland) Celtic	
2017–18	Bayern Munich	Semi-finals	3–4	(Spain) Real Madrid	1–2 home, 2–2 away
2017–18	Borussia Dortmund	3rd in Group Stage	N/A	(England) Tottenham Hotspur, (Spain) Real Madrid, (Cyprus) APOEL	
2017–18	RB Leipzig	3rd in Group Stage	N/A	(Turkey) Beşiktaş, (Portugal) Porto, (France) Monaco	
2017–18	TSG Hoffenheim	Play-off round	3–6	(England) Liverpool	1–2 home, 2–4 away
2018–19	Bayern Munich	Round of 16	1–3	(England) Liverpool	1–3 home, 0–0 away
2018–19	Schalke 04	Round of 16	2–10	(England) Manchester City	2–3 home, 0–7 away
2018–19	Borussia Dortmund	Round of 16	0–4	(England) Tottenham Hotspur	0–1 home, 0–3 away
2018–19	TSG Hoffenheim	4th in Group Stage	N/A	(England) Manchester City, (France) Lyon, (Ukraine) Shakhtar Donetsk	
2019–20	Bayern Munich	Winners	1–0	(France) Paris Saint-Germain	
2019–20	RB Leipzig	Semi-finals	0–3	(France) Paris Saint-Germain	
2019–20	Borussia Dortmund	Round of 16	2–3	(France) Paris Saint-Germain	2–1 home, 0–2 away
2019–20	Bayer Leverkusen	3rd in Group Stage	N/A	(Italy) Juventus, (Spain) Atlético Madrid, (Russia) Lokomotiv Moscow	
2020–21	Bayern Munich	Quarter-finals	3–3	(France) Paris Saint-Germain	2–3 home, 1–0 away
2020–21	Borussia Dortmund	Quarter-finals	2–4	(England) Manchester City	1–2 home, 1–2 away
2020–21	RB Leipzig	Round of 16	0–4	(England) Liverpool	0–2 home, 0–2 away
2020–21	Borussia Mönchengladbach	Round of 16	0–4	(England) Manchester City	0–2 home, 0–2 away
2021–22	Bayern Munich	Quarter-finals	1–2	(Spain) Villarreal	1–1 home, 0–1 away
2021–22	Borussia Dortmund	3rd in Group Stage	N/A	(Netherlands) Ajax, (Portugal) Sporting CP, (Turkey) Beşiktaş	
2021–22	RB Leipzig	3rd in Group Stage	N/A	(England) Manchester City, (France) Paris Saint-Germain, (Belgium) Club Brugge	
2021–22	VfL Wolfsburg	4th in Group Stage	N/A	(France) Lille, (Austria) Red Bull Salzburg, (Spain) Sevilla	
2022–23	Bayern Munich	Quarter-finals	1–4	(England) Manchester City	1–1 home, 0–3 away
2022–23	RB Leipzig	Round of 16	1–8	(England) Manchester City	1–1 home, 0–7 away
2022–23	Borussia Dortmund	Round of 16	1–2	(England) Chelsea	1–0 home, 0–2 away
2022–23	Eintracht Frankfurt	Round of 16	0–5	(Italy) Napoli	0–2 home, 0–3 away
2022–23	Bayer Leverkusen	3rd in Group Stage	N/A	(Portugal) Porto, (Belgium) Club Brugge, (Spain) Atlético Madrid	
2023–24	Borussia Dortmund	Final	0–2	(Spain) Real Madrid	
2023–24	Bayern Munich	Semi-finals	3–4	(Spain) Real Madrid	2–2 home, 1–2 away
2023–24	RB Leipzig	Round of 16	1–2	(Spain) Real Madrid	0–1 home, 1–1 away
2023–24	Union Berlin	4th in Group Stage	N/A	(Spain) Real Madrid, (Italy) Napoli, (Portugal) Braga	
2024–25	Bayern Munich	Quarter-finals	3–4	(Italy) Internazionale	1–2 home, 2–2 away
2024–25	Borussia Dortmund	Quarter-finals	3–5	(Spain) Barcelona	3–1 home, 0–4 away
2024–25	Bayer Leverkusen	Round of 16	0–5	(Germany) Bayern Munich	0–2 home, 0–3 away
2024–25	VfB Stuttgart	League Phase	N/A	26th place	
2024–25	RB Leipzig	League Phase	N/A	32nd place	
2025–26	Bayern Munich	Semi-finals	5–6	(France) Paris Saint-Germain	1–1 home, 4–5 away
2025–26	Bayer Leverkusen	Round of 16	1–3	(England) Arsenal	1–1 home, 0–2 away
2025–26	Borussia Dortmund	Knockout phase play-offs	3–4	(Italy) Atalanta	2–0 home, 1–4 away
2025–26	Eintracht Frankfurt	League Phase	N/A	33rd place	

=== UEFA Europa League/UEFA Cup ===
After German reunification

Season	Team	Progress	Score	Opponents	Venue(s)
1992–93	Borussia Dortmund	Final	1–6	(Italy) Juventus	1–3 home, 0–3 away
1992–93	1. FC Kaiserslautern	Third round	0–3	(Netherlands) Ajax	0–1 home, 0–2 away
1992–93	Eintracht Frankfurt	Second round	0–1	(Turkey) Galatasaray	0–0 home, 0–1 away
1993–94	Karlsruher SC	Semi-finals	1–1	Austria Salzburg	1–1 home, 0–0 away
1993–94	Borussia Dortmund	Quarter-finals	3–4	(Italy) Internazionale	1–3 home, 2–1 away
1993–94	Eintracht Frankfurt	Quarter-finals	1–1 (4–5 p)	Austria Salzburg	1–0 home, 0–1 away
1993–94	Bayern Munich	Second round	2–3	(England) Norwich City	1–2 home, 1–1 away
1994–95	Bayer Leverkusen	Semi-finals	1–5	(Italy) Parma	1–2 home, 0–3 away
1994–95	Borussia Dortmund	Semi-finals	3–4	(Italy) Juventus	1–2 home, 2–2 away
1994–95	Eintracht Frankfurt	Quarter-finals	1–4	(Italy) Juventus	1–1 home, 0–3 away
1994–95	1. FC Kaiserslautern	Second round	1–1	(Denmark) Odense BK	1–1 home, 0–0 away
1995–96	Bayern Munich	Winners	5–1	(France) Bordeaux	2–0 home, 3–1 away
1995–96	Werder Bremen	Third round	1–2	(Netherlands) PSV Eindhoven	0–0 home, 1–2 away
1995–96	1. FC Kaiserslautern	Second round	1–4	(Spain) Real Betis	1–3 home, 0–1 away
1995–96	SC Freiburg	First round	1–2	(Czech Republic) Slavia Prague	1–2 home, 0–0 away
1996–97	Schalke 04	Winners	1–1 (4–1 p)	(Italy) Internazionale	1–0 home, 0–1 away
1996–97	Hamburger SV	Third round	0–5	(France) Monaco	0–2 home, 0–3 away
1996–97	Karlsruher SC	Third round	3–6	(Denmark) Brøndby	0–5 home, 3–1 away
1996–97	Borussia Mönchengladbach	Second round	3–4	(France) Monaco	2–4 home, 1–0 away
1996–97	Bayern Munich	First round	1–3	(Spain) Valencia	1–0 home, 0–3 away
1997–98	Schalke 04	Quarter-finals	1–2	(Italy) Internazionale	1–1 home, 0–1 away
1997–98	VfL Bochum	Third round	4–6	(Netherlands) Ajax	2–2 home, 2–4 away
1997–98	Karlsruher SC	Third round	0–1	(Russia) Spartak Moscow	0–0 home, 0–1 away
1997–98	1860 Munich	Second round	2–4	(Austria) Rapid Wien	2–1 home, 0–3 away
1998–99	Bayer Leverkusen	Second round	2–3	(Scotland) Rangers	1–2 home, 1–1 away
1998–99	VfB Stuttgart	Second round	3–4	(Belgium) Club Brugge	1–1 home, 2–3 away
1998–99	Werder Bremen	Second round	3–4	(France) Marseille	1–1 home, 2–3 away
1998–99	Schalke 04	First round	1–1 (4–5 p)	(Czech Republic) Slavia Prague	1–0 home, 0–1 away
1999–2000	Werder Bremen	Quarter-finals	2–6	(England) Arsenal	2–4 home, 0–2 away
1999–2000	Borussia Dortmund	Fourth round	0–2	(Turkey) Galatasaray	0–2 home, 0–0 away
1999–2000	Bayer Leverkusen	Third round	2–2	(Italy) Udinese	1–2 home, 1–0 away
2000–01	1. FC Kaiserslautern	Semi-finals	2–9	(Spain) Alavés	1–4 home, 1–5 away
2000–01	VfB Stuttgart	Fourth round	1–2	(Spain) Celta Vigo	0–0 home, 1–2 away
2000–01	1860 Munich	Third round	2–4	(Italy) Parma	0–2 home, 2–2 away
2000–01	Bayer Leverkusen	Third round	4–6	(Greece) AEK Athens	4–4 home, 0–2 away
2000–01	Hamburger SV	Third round	0–4	(Italy) Roma	0–3 home, 0–1 away
2000–01	Hertha BSC	Third round	1–2	(Italy) Internazionale	0–0 home, 1–2 away
2000–01	Werder Bremen	Third round	1–4	(France) Bordeaux	0–0 home, 1–4 away
2001–02	Borussia Dortmund	Final	2–3	(Netherlands) Feyenoord	
2001–02	SC Freiburg	Third round	2–3	(Netherlands) Feyenoord	2–2 home, 0–1 away
2001–02	Hertha BSC	Third round	0–3	(Switzerland) Servette	0–3 home, 0–0 away
2001–02	Union Berlin	Second round	0–2	(Bulgaria) Litex Lovech	0–2 home, 0–0 away
2002–03	Hertha BSC	Fourth round	3–3	(Portugal) Boavista	3–2 home, 0–1 away
2002–03	VfB Stuttgart	Fourth round	4–5	(Scotland) Celtic	3–2 home, 1–3 away
2002–03	Schalke 04	Third round	2–5	(Poland) Wisła Kraków	1–4 home, 1–1 away
2002–03	Werder Bremen	Second round	4–5	(Netherlands) Vitesse	3–3 home, 1–2 away
2003–04	Borussia Dortmund	Second round	2–6	(France) Sochaux	2–2 home, 0–4 away
2003–04	Schalke 04	Second round	3–3 (1–3 p)	(Denmark) Brøndby	2–1 home, 1–2 away
2003–04	Hamburger SV	First round	2–4	(Ukraine) Dnipro Dnipropetrovsk	2–1 home, 0–3 away
2003–04	Hertha BSC	First round	0–1	(Poland) Groclin	0–0 home, 0–1 away
2003–04	1. FC Kaiserslautern	First round	1–3	(Czech Republic) Teplice	1–2 home, 0–1 away
2004–05	Alemannia Aachen	Round of 32	1–2	(Netherlands) AZ	0–0 home, 1–2 away
2004–05	Schalke 04	Round of 32	1–2	(Ukraine) Shakhtar Donetsk	0–1 home, 1–1 away
2004–05	VfB Stuttgart	Round of 32	0–2	(Italy) Parma	0–2 home, 0–0 away
2004–05	VfL Bochum	First round	1–1	(Belgium) Standard Liège	1–1 home, 0–0 away
2005–06	Schalke 04	Semi-finals	0–1	(Spain) Sevilla	0–0 home, 0–1 away
2005–06	Hamburger SV	Round of 16	3–3	(Romania) Rapid București	3–1 home, 0–2 away
2005–06	Hertha BSC	Round of 32	0–3	(Romania) Rapid București	0–1 home, 0–2 away
2005–06	VfB Stuttgart	Round of 32	2–2	(England) Middlesbrough	1–2 home, 0–1 away
2005–06	Bayer Leverkusen	First round	0–2	(Bulgaria) CSKA Sofia	0–1 home, 0–1 away
2005–06	Mainz 05	First round	0–2	(Spain) Sevilla	0–2 home, 0–0 away
2006–07	Werder Bremen	Semi-finals	1–5	(Spain) Espanyol	1–2 home, 0–3 away
2006–07	Bayer Leverkusen	Quarter-finals	0–4	(Spain) Osasuna	0–3 home, 0–1 away
2006–07	Eintracht Frankfurt	5th in Group Stage	N/A	(England) Newcastle United, (Spain) Celta Vigo, (Turkey) Fenerbahçe, (Italy) Palermo	
2006–07	Hertha BSC	First round	2–3	(Denmark) Odense	2–2 home, 0–1 away
2006–07	Schalke 04	First round	2–3	(France) Nancy	1–0 home, 1–3 away
2007–08	Bayern Munich	Semi-finals	1–5	(Russia) Zenit Saint Petersburg	1–1 home, 0–4 away
2007–08	Bayer Leverkusen	Quarter-finals	2–4	(Russia) Zenit Saint Petersburg	1–4 home, 1–0 away
2007–08	Hamburger SV	Round of 16	3–3	(Germany) Bayer Leverkusen	3–2 home, 0–1 away
2007–08	Werder Bremen	Round of 16	1–2	(Scotland) Rangers	1–0 home, 0–2 away
2007–08	1. FC Nürnberg	Round of 16	2–3	(Portugal) Benfica	2–2 home, 0–1 away
2008–09	Werder Bremen	Final	1–2	(Ukraine) Shakhtar Donetsk	
2008–09	Hamburger SV	Semi-finals	3–3	(Germany) Werder Bremen	2–3 home, 0–1 away
2008–09	VfB Stuttgart	Round of 32	2–4	(Russia) Zenit Saint Petersburg	1–2 home, 1–2 away
2008–09	VfL Wolfsburg	Round of 32	1–5	(France) Paris Saint-Germain	1–3 home, 0–2 away
2008–09	Hertha BSC	4th in Group Stage	N/A	(Ukraine) Metalist Kharkiv, (Turkey) Galatasaray, (Greece) Olympiacos, (Portugal) Benfica	
2008–09	Schalke 04	5th in Group Stage	N/A	(England) Manchester City, (Netherlands) Twente, (France) Paris Saint-Germain, (Spain) Racing Santander	
2008–09	Borussia Dortmund	First round	2–2 (3–4 p)	(Italy) Udinese	0–2 home, 2–0 away
2009–10	Hamburger SV	Semi-finals	1–2	(England) Fulham	0–0 home, 1–2 away
2009–10	VfL Wolfsburg	Quarter-finals	1–3	(England) Fulham	0–1 home, 1–2 away
2009–10	Werder Bremen	Round of 16	5–5	(Spain) Valencia	4–4 home, 1–1 away
2009–10	Hertha BSC	Round of 32	1–5	(Portugal) Benfica	1–1 home, 0–4 away
2010–11	Bayer Leverkusen	Round of 16	3–5	(Spain) Villarreal	2–3 home, 1–2 away
2010–11	VfB Stuttgart	Round of 32	1–4	(Portugal) Benfica	0–2 home, 1–2 away
2010–11	Borussia Dortmund	3rd in Group Stage	N/A	(France) Paris Saint-Germain, (Spain) Sevilla, (Ukraine) Karpaty Lviv	
2011–12	Hannover 96	Quarter-finals	2–4	(Spain) Atlético Madrid	1–2 home, 1–2 away
2011–12	Schalke 04	Quarter-finals	4–6	(Spain) Athletic Bilbao	2–4 home, 2–2 away
2011–12	Mainz 05	Third qualifying round	2–2 (3–4 p)	(Romania) Gaz Metan Mediaș	1–1 home, 1–1 away
2012–13	VfB Stuttgart	Round of 16	1–5	(Italy) Lazio	0–2 home, 1–3 away
2012–13	Bayer Leverkusen	Round of 32	1–3	(Portugal) Benfica	0–1 home, 1–2 away
2012–13	Borussia Mönchengladbach	Round of 32	3–5	(Italy) Lazio	3–3 home, 0–2 away
2012–13	Hannover 96	Round of 32	2–4	(Russia) Anzhi Makhachkala	1–1 home, 1–3 away
2013–14	Eintracht Frankfurt	Round of 32	5–5	(Portugal) FC Porto	3–3 home, 2–2 away
2013–14	SC Freiburg	3rd in Group Stage	N/A	(Spain) Sevilla, (Czech Republic) Slovan Liberec, (Portugal) Estoril	
2013–14	VfB Stuttgart	Play-off round	3–4	(Croatia) Rijeka	2–2 home, 1–2 away
2014–15	VfL Wolfsburg	Quarter-finals	3–6	(Italy) Napoli	1–4 home, 2–2 away
2014–15	Borussia Mönchengladbach	Round of 32	2–4	(Spain) Sevilla	2–3 home, 0–1 away
2014–15	Mainz 05	Third qualifying round	2–3	(Greece) Asteras Tripolis	1–0 home, 1–3 away
2015–16	Borussia Dortmund	Quarter-finals	4–5	(England) Liverpool	1–1 home, 3–4 away
2015–16	Bayer Leverkusen	Round of 16	0–2	(Spain) Villarreal	0–0 home, 0–2 away
2015–16	FC Augsburg	Round of 32	0–1	(England) Liverpool	0–0 home, 0–1 away
2015–16	Schalke 04	Round of 32	0–3	(Ukraine) Shakhtar Donetsk	0–3 home, 0–0 away
2016–17	Schalke 04	Quarter-finals	3–4	(Netherlands) Ajax	3–2 home, 0–2 away
2016–17	Borussia Mönchengladbach	Round of 16	3–3	(Germany) Schalke 04	2–2 home, 1–1 away
2016–17	Mainz 05	3rd in Group Stage	N/A	(France) Saint-Étienne, (Belgium) Anderlecht, (Azerbaijan) Gabala	
2016–17	Hertha BSC	Third qualifying round	2–3	(Denmark) Brøndby	1–0 home, 1–3 away
2017–18	RB Leipzig	Quarter-finals	3–5	(France) Marseille	1–0 home, 2–5 away
2017–18	Borussia Dortmund	Round of 16	1–2	(Austria) Red Bull Salzburg	1–2 home, 0–0 away
2017–18	1. FC Köln	3rd in Group Stage	N/A	(England) Arsenal, (Serbia) Red Star Belgrade, (Belarus) BATE Borisov	
2017–18	TSG Hoffenheim	4th in Group Stage	N/A	(Portugal) Braga, (Bulgaria) Ludogorets Razgrad, (Turkey) İstanbul Başakşehir	
2017–18	SC Freiburg	Third qualifying round	1–2	(Slovenia) Domžale	1–0 home, 0–2 away
2018–19	Eintracht Frankfurt	Semi-finals	2–2 (3–4 p)	(England) Chelsea	1–1 home, 1–1 away
2018–19	Bayer Leverkusen	Round of 32	1–1	(Russia) Krasnodar	1–1 home, 0–0 away
2018–19	RB Leipzig	3rd in Group Stage	N/A	(Austria) Red Bull Salzburg, (Scotland) Celtic, (Norway) Rosenborg	
2019–20	Bayer Leverkusen	Quarter-finals	1–2	(Italy) Internazionale	
2019–20	Eintracht Frankfurt	Round of 16	0–4	(Switzerland) Basel	0–3 home, 0–1 away
2019–20	VfL Wolfsburg	Round of 16	1–5	(Ukraine) Shakhtar Donetsk	1–2 home, 0–3 away
2019–20	Borussia Mönchengladbach	3rd in Group Stage	N/A	(Turkey) İstanbul Başakşehir, (Italy) Roma, (Austria) Wolfsberger AC	
2020–21	Bayer Leverkusen	Round of 32	3–6	(Switzerland) Young Boys	0–2 home, 3–4 away
2020–21	TSG Hoffenheim	Round of 32	3–5	(Norway) Molde	0–2 home, 3–3 away
2020–21	VfL Wolfsburg	Play-off round	1–2	(Greece) AEK Athens	1–2 away
2021–22	Eintracht Frankfurt	Winners	1–1 (5–4 p)	(Scotland) Rangers	
2021–22	RB Leipzig	Semi-finals	2–3	(Scotland) Rangers	1–0 home, 1–3 away
2021–22	Bayer Leverkusen	Round of 16	2–4	(Italy) Atalanta	0–1 home, 2–3 away
2021–22	Borussia Dortmund	Knockout round play-offs	4–6	(Scotland) Rangers	2–4 home, 2–2 away
2022–23	Bayer Leverkusen	Semi-finals	0–1	(Italy) Roma	0–0 home, 0–1 away
2022–23	SC Freiburg	Round of 16	0–3	(Italy) Juventus	0–2 home, 0–1 away
2022–23	Union Berlin	Round of 16	3–6	(Belgium) Union Saint-Gilloise	3–3 home, 0–3 away
2023–24	Bayer Leverkusen	Final	0–3	(Italy) Atalanta	
2023–24	SC Freiburg	Round of 16	1–5	(England) West Ham United	1–0 home, 0–5 away
2024–25	Eintracht Frankfurt	Quarter-finals	1–2	(England) Tottenham Hotspur	0–1 home, 1–1 away
2024–25	TSG Hoffenheim	League Phase	N/A	27th place	
2025–26	SC Freiburg	Final	0–3	(England) Aston Villa	
2025–26	VfB Stuttgart	Round of 16	1–4	(Portugal) Porto	1–2 home, 0–2 away

=== UEFA Conference League ===
Season	Team	Progress	Score	Opponents	Venue(s)
2021–22	Union Berlin	3rd in Group Stage	N/A	(Netherlands) Feyenoord, (Czech Republic) Slavia Prague, (Israel) Maccabi Haifa	
2022–23	1. FC Köln	3rd in Group Stage	N/A	(France) Nice, (Serbia) Partizan, (Czech Republic) Slovácko	
2023–24	Eintracht Frankfurt	Knockout round play-offs	3–4	(Belgium) Union Saint-Gilloise	1–2 home, 2–2 away
2024–25	1. FC Heidenheim	Knockout phase play-offs	3–4	(Denmark) Copenhagen	1–3 home, 2–1 away
2025–26	Mainz 05	Quarter-finals	2–4	(France) Strasbourg	2–0 home, 0–4 away

== Notes ==
- ^aStuttgart would have won on away goals; however, it was realised that in the second leg between Leeds United and Stuttgart, Stuttgart had substituted a fourth foreign player. At the time, a maximum of three foreign players was allowed. The game was awarded to Leeds United with a score of 3–0, making it 3–3 on aggregate with no difference in away goals. A play-off match in Barcelona was ordered, which Leeds United won 2–1.
