= UAE German Supercup =

Association football competition

The UAE German Supercup is an association football match between a team from the German Bundesliga and a team from the United Arab Emirates. The first competition was held in 2010.

== UAE German Supercup ==
Year	Winner	Result	Runner-up	Stadium
2010	Werder Bremen	2–1	Al Ain	Khalifa Bin Zayed Stadium - Alain Club
2011	Hamburger SV	3–2	Al Wasl^{1}	Al-Wasl Club Stadium
2012	n/a	n/a	n/a	not held ^{2}
2013	n/a	n/a	n/a	not held ^{3}
2014	n/a	n/a	n/a	not held ^{4}
2015	n/a	n/a	n/a	not held ^{5}
2016	n/a	n/a	n/a	not held ^{6}
2017	n/a	n/a	n/a	not held ^{7}
2018	n/a	n/a	n/a	not held ^{8}
2019	n/a	n/a	n/a	not held ^{9}

- ^1 Instead of Al-Wahda FC
- ^2 There was a match in 2012 but it is not sure whether it was a match for the UAE German Supercup or not. (VfL Wolfsburg 3:1 Al Jazira Club)
- ^3 There was a match in 2013 but it is not sure whether if it is a match for the UAE German Supercup or not. (Eintracht Frankfurt 4:5 Al Jazira Club)
- ^4 There only was an intra-German match in 2014 in Abu Dhabi (Eintracht Frankfurt 2:3 FC Schalke 04)
- ^5 There was an intra-German match in 2015 in Abu Dhabi (Eintracht Frankfurt vs. Hamburger SV 3:2) and Frankfurt played against Al Ain (1:0). There was also a match in Belek between Werder Bremen and Al-Fujairah SC (3:1). But it is not if any of this games is a UAE German Supercup game.
- ^6 There only was an intra-German match in 2016 in Abu Dhabi (Eintracht Frankfurt 0:4 Borussia Dortmund) in Dubai.
- ^7
- ^8
- ^9
