= 90elf =

German radio station

90elf.de, launched on 13 August 2008, was a commercial German language Internet radio station which specialized in broadcasting association football matches. The slogan of the station was 90elf - Your football radio.

== Overview ==
The station's name derives from the normal length of a football game (90 minutes) and the number of players in a football team (German: elf, "eleven").

In some German regions 90elf could also be received by cable or DVB-T. Since August 2011 90elf could be received via Digital Audio Broadcasting.

The station stopped broadcasting on June 2, 2013, after losing the rights to the Bundesliga.

== Programs ==
The main part of the programme was the live coverage of matches of the German Bundesliga, the 2. Bundesliga (second division) and several German Cup matches.

When not broadcasting live football action, 90elf offered German football fans regular national and international football news updates, football-themed magazines and radio talk shows.
