= Bundesliga attendance =

Bundesliga

The Bundesliga, introduced in 1963, had a spectator average for its first season of over 27,000. The inaugural season was seen by over 6,6 million spectators with VfB Stuttgart being the best-supported team. After a slight increase in the second season figures declined to an all-time low by 1972–73, in the wake of the 1971 Bundesliga scandal, when the league averaged just over 17,400 spectators per game. In this season Rot-Weiß Oberhausen also set the all-time low for support, becoming the first team to record an average of less than 10,000 spectators when the club drew just 6,941 per game.

From 1973 onwards, until 1979, figures improved again for the Bundesliga, especially after clubs like Borussia Dortmund and VfB Stuttgart returned from the 2. Bundesliga. The latter became the first club to record an average above 50,000 when it drew 55,559 per home game in 1977–78. The league experienced another sharp decline in the 1980s, dropping to an average of just over 18,000 in 1985–86. It made a slow recovery from there and accelerated from 1991, after the German reunification in 1990. Since then the Bundesliga has experienced a steady increase, reaching its all-time high in 2011–12 when it attracted 13,805,514 spectators, twice as many as in its inaugural season, and recorded an average of 45,116.

Since 1998–99 season Borussia Dortmund has been the best-supported club each year, having surpassed the 80,000 mark per game in 2011–12. At the other end of the scale only on nine occasions have clubs attracted an average of less than 10,000, these being Rot-Weiß Oberhausen in 1972–73, Wuppertaler SV in 1974–75, Bayer Leverkusen in 1981–82, 1982–83, 1984–85 and 1987–88, FC Homburg in 1987–88 and 1989–90 and SpVgg Unterhaching in 1999–2000.

Stuttgart and Hannover, which are based in large cities, were relegated for the 2016–17 season, which caused a reduction in the average number of spectators. Both teams returned to the Bundesliga for the 2017–18 season, whereas Darmstadt and Ingolstadt, the two bottoms teams in attendance, were relegated.

== Spectators ==
The spectator figures for league since the inaugural 1963–64 season. The 1963–64 and 1964–65 seasons were played with 16 clubs in the league, the 1991–92 with 20 clubs and all others with 18 clubs. The last eight matchdays of the 2019–20 season, the majority of the 2020–21 season and some matches at the start of the 2021–22 season were played behind closed doors due to the COVID-19 pandemic.

Spectators
Season	Overall	Average	Best supported club	Average
1963–64	6,616,371	27,568	VfB Stuttgart	40,133
1964–65	6,918,000	28,825	Hannover 96	43,267
1965–66	7,528,927	24,604	Hannover 96	32,088
1966–67	7,511,500	24,547	VfB Stuttgart	29,176
1967–68	6,438,800	21,042	1. FC Nürnberg	39,765
1968–69	6,706,700	21,917	Hertha BSC	44,176
1969–70	6,321,575	20,659	Hertha BSC	42,416
1970–71	6,550,000	21,405	Hertha BSC	45,529
1971–72	5,731,400	18,730	FC Schalke 04	28,529
1972–73	5,326,500	17,407	FC Bayern Munich	33,353
1973–74	6,794,100	22,203	FC Schalke 04	42,441
1974–75	6,955,321	22,730	FC Schalke 04	39,988
1975–76	7,093,100	23,180	FC Schalke 04	34,212
1976–77	7,827,564	25,580	Borussia Dortmund	43,282
1977–78	8,444,530	27,597	VfB Stuttgart	55,559
1978–79	7,955,959	26,000	Hamburger SV	42,441
1979–80	7,433,878	24,294	FC Bayern Munich	39,579
1980–81	7,364,087	24,066	FC Bayern Munich	36,412
1981–82	6,693,852	21,875	Hamburger SV	34,700
1982–83	6,481,847	21,183	FC Bayern Munich	31,324
1983–84	6,341,307	20,723	VfB Stuttgart	31,876
1984–85	6,066,979	19,827	FC Bayern Munich	32,765
1985–86	5,630,218	18,399	1. FC Nürnberg	28,765
1986–87	6,294,772	20,571	FC Bayern Munich	37,471
1987–88	6,019,437	19,671	Borussia Dortmund	29,424
1988–89	5,755,248	18,808	Borussia Dortmund	30,572
1989–90	6,497,884	21,235	Borussia Dortmund	37,173
1990–91	6,640,061	21,700	Borussia Dortmund	35,923
1991–92	9,268,395	24,391	FC Schalke 04	47,468
1992–93	8,020,735	26,212	FC Bayern Munich	46,059
1993–94	8,317,953	27,183	FC Bayern Munich	48,294
1994–95	9,196,246	30,053	FC Bayern Munich	54,176
1995–96	9,424,485	30,799	FC Bayern Munich	59,471
1996–97	9,449,798	30,882	FC Bayern Munich	58,059
1997–98	10,087,247	32,965	FC Bayern Munich	54,529
1998–99	10,026,166	32,765	Borussia Dortmund	65,494
1999–00	9,549,181	31,206	Borussia Dortmund	64,641
2000–01	9,462,110	30,922	Borussia Dortmund	63,729
2001–02	10,113,007	33,049	Borussia Dortmund	66,171
2002–03	10,447,982	34,144	Borussia Dortmund	67,800
2003–04	11,442,726	37,395	Borussia Dortmund	79,618
2004–05	11,570,634	37,813	Borussia Dortmund	77,235
2005–06	12,478,319	40,779	Borussia Dortmund	72,808
2006–07	12,226,795	39,957	Borussia Dortmund	72,652
2007–08	12,069,813	39,444	Borussia Dortmund	72,510
2008–09	13,011,578	42,521	Borussia Dortmund	74,851
2009–10	13,001,871	42,490	Borussia Dortmund	77,246
2010–11	13,054,960	42,663	Borussia Dortmund	79,151
2011–12	13,805,514	45,116	Borussia Dortmund	80,521
2012–13	13,042,263	42,622	Borussia Dortmund	80,520
2013–14	13,311,145	43,500	Borussia Dortmund	80,297
2014–15	13,323,031	43,539	Borussia Dortmund	80,463
2015–16	13,249,778	43,300	Borussia Dortmund	81,178
2016–17	12,702,427	41,511	Borussia Dortmund	79,653
2017–18	13,661,796	44,646	Borussia Dortmund	79,396
2018–19	13,298,147	43,358	Borussia Dortmund	80,820
2019–20	9,112,950	29,781	FC Bayern Munich	57,353
2020–21	163,705	535	Borussia Dortmund	1,282
2021–22	4,416,988	21,039	Borussia Dortmund	41,789
2022–23	13,147,701	42,966	Borussia Dortmund	81,228
2023–24	12,090,797	39,512	Borussia Dortmund	81,305
2024–25	11,828,684	38,656	Borussia Dortmund	81,365
2025–26	12,947,047	41,483	Borussia Dortmund	81,285
