= BBCH =

BBCH may refer to:

- Big Brother: Celebrity Hijack
- BBCH-scale, a scale used to identify the phenological development stages of a plant
