= BBCH-scale (potato) =

Development stages of potatoes

The BBCH-scale (potato) identifies the phenological development stages of a potato (Solanum tuberosum). It is a plant species-specific version of the BBCH-scale.

Growth stage	Code		Description
Growth stage	2 digit	3 digit	Description
0: Sprouting/Germination	00	000	Innate or enforced dormancy, Dry seed tuber not sprouted
0: Sprouting/Germination	01	001	Beginning of sprouting: Beginning of sprouts visible (< 1 mm) seed imbibition
0: Sprouting/Germination	02	002	Sprouts upright (< 2 mm)
0: Sprouting/Germination	03	003	End of dormancy: sprouts 2–3 mm Seed imbibition complete
0: Sprouting/Germination	05	005	Beginning of root formation Radicle (root) emerged from seed
0: Sprouting/Germination	07	007	Beginning of stem formation Hypocotyl with cotyledons breaking
0: Sprouting/Germination	08	008	Stems growing towards soil surface, Hypocotyl with formation of scale leaves in the axils; cotyledons growing of which stolons will develop later towards soil surface
0: Sprouting/Germination	09	009	Emergence: stems break through soil surface; cotyledons break through soil surface
0: Sprouting/Germination	09	021–029^{1}	
1: Leaf development	10	100	From tuber: first leaves begin to extend From seed: cotyledons completely unfolded
1: Leaf development	11	101	First leaf of main stem unfolded (> 4 cm)
1: Leaf development	12	102	Second leaf of main stem unfolded (> 4 cm)
1: Leaf development	13	103	Third leaf of main stem unfolded (> 4 cm)
1: Leaf development	1 .	10 .	Stages continuous till ...
1: Leaf development	19	109	Nine or more leaves of main stem unfolded (> 4 cm) (2 digit);^{2} 9 leaves of main stem unfolded (> 4 cm) (3 digit)
1: Leaf development	19	110	Tenth leaf of main stem unfolded (> 4 cm)
1: Leaf development	11 .		Stages continuous till ...
1: Leaf development	11 .	119	Nineteenth leaf of main stem unfolded (> 4 cm)
1: Leaf development	11 .	121	First leaf of second order branch above first inflorescence unfolded (> 4 cm)
1: Leaf development	11 .	122	Second leaf of second order branch above first inflorescence unfolded (> 4 cm)
1: Leaf development	12 .		Stages continuous till ...
1: Leaf development	12 .	131	First leaf of third order branch above second inflorescence unfolded (> 4 cm)
1: Leaf development	12 .	132	Second leaf of third order branch above second inflorescence unfolded (> 4 cm)
1: Leaf development	13 .		Stages continuous till ...
1: Leaf development	13 .	1NX	Xth leaf of nth order branch above (n-1)th inflorescence unfolded (> 4 cm)
2: Formation of basal side shoots below and above soil surface (main stem)	21	201	First basal side shoot visible (> 5 cm)
2: Formation of basal side shoots below and above soil surface (main stem)	22	202	Second basal side shoot visible (> 5 cm)
2: Formation of basal side shoots below and above soil surface (main stem)	23	203	Third basal side shoot visible (> 5 cm)
2: Formation of basal side shoots below and above soil surface (main stem)	2 .	20 .	Stages continuous till ...
2: Formation of basal side shoots below and above soil surface (main stem)	29	209	Nine or more basal side shoots visible (> 5 cm)
3: Main stem elongation (crop cover)	31	301	Beginning of crop cover: 10% of plants meet between rows
3: Main stem elongation (crop cover)	32	302	20% of plants meet between rows
3: Main stem elongation (crop cover)	33	303	30% of plants meet between rows
3: Main stem elongation (crop cover)	34	304	40% of plants meet between rows
3: Main stem elongation (crop cover)	35	305	50% of plants meet between rows
3: Main stem elongation (crop cover)	36	306	60% of plants meet between rows
3: Main stem elongation (crop cover)	37	307	70% of plants meet between rows
3: Main stem elongation (crop cover)	38	308	80% of plants meet between rows
3: Main stem elongation (crop cover)	39	309	Crop cover complete: about 90% of plants meet between rows
4: Tuber formation	40	400	Tuber initiation: swelling of first stolon tips to twice the diameter of subtending stolon
4: Tuber formation	41	401	10% of total final tuber mass reached
4: Tuber formation	42	402	20% of total final tuber mass reached
4: Tuber formation	43	403	30% of total final tuber mass reached
4: Tuber formation	44	404	40% of total final tuber mass reached
4: Tuber formation	45	405	50% of total final tuber mass reached
4: Tuber formation	46	406	60% of total final tuber mass reached
4: Tuber formation	47	407	70% of total final tuber mass reached
4: Tuber formation	48	408	Maximum of total tuber mass reached, tubers detach easily from stolons, skin set not yet complete (skin easily removable with thumb)
4: Tuber formation	49	409	Skin set complete: (skin at apical end of tuber not removable with thumb) 95% of tubers in this stage
5: Inflorescence (cyme) emergence	51	501	First individual buds (1–2 mm) of first inflorescence visible (main stem)
5: Inflorescence (cyme) emergence	55	505	Buds of first inflorescence extended to 5 mm
5: Inflorescence (cyme) emergence	59	509	First flower petals of first inflorescence visible
5: Inflorescence (cyme) emergence	59	521	Individual buds of second inflorescence visible (second order branch)
5: Inflorescence (cyme) emergence	59	525	Buds of second inflorescence extended to 5 mm open (main stem)
5: Inflorescence (cyme) emergence	59	529	First flower petals of second inflorescence visible above sepals
5: Inflorescence (cyme) emergence	59	531	Individual buds of third inflorescence visible (third order branch)
5: Inflorescence (cyme) emergence	59	535	Buds of third inflorescence extended to 5 mm
5: Inflorescence (cyme) emergence	59	539	First flower petals of third inflorescence visible above sepals
5: Inflorescence (cyme) emergence	5N .		Nth inflorescence emerging
6: Flowering	60	600	First open flowers in population
6: Flowering	61	601	Beginning of flowering: 10% of flowers in the first inflorescence open (main stem)
6: Flowering	62	602	20% of flowers in the first inflorescence open
6: Flowering	63	603	30% of flowers in the first inflorescence open
6: Flowering	64	604	40% of flowers in the first inflorescence open
6: Flowering	65	605	Full flowering: 50% of flowers in the first inflorescence open
6: Flowering	66	606	60% of flowers in the first inflorescence open
6: Flowering	67	607	70% of flowers in the first inflorescence open
6: Flowering	68	608	80% of flowers in the first inflorescence open
6: Flowering	69	609	End of flowering in the first inflorescence
6: Flowering		621	Beginning of flowering: 10% of flowers in the second inflorescence open (second order branch)
6: Flowering		625	Full flowering: 50% of flowers in the second inflorescence open
6: Flowering		629	End of flowering in the 2nd inflorescence
6: Flowering		631	Beginning of flowering: 10% of flowers in the third inflorescence open (third order branch)
6: Flowering		635	Full flowering: 50% of flowers in the third inflorescence open
6: Flowering		639	End of flowering in the third inflorescence
6: Flowering	6N .		Nth inflorescence flowering
6: Flowering	6N .	6N9	End of flowering
7: Development of fruit	70	700	First berries visible
7: Development of fruit	71	701	10% of berries in the first fructification have reached full size (main stem)
7: Development of fruit	72	702	20% of berries in the first fructification have reached full size
7: Development of fruit	73	703	30% of berries in the first fructification have reached full size
7: Development of fruit	7 .	70 .	Stages continuous till ...
7: Development of fruit	7 .	721	10% of berries in the second fructification have reached full size (second order branch)
7: Development of fruit	7N .		Development of berries in nth fructification
7: Development of fruit	7N .	7N9	Nearly all berries in the nth fructification have reached full size (or have been shed)
8: Ripening of fruit and seed	81	801	Berries in the first fructification still green, seed light-coloured (main stem)
8: Ripening of fruit and seed	85	805	Berries in the first fructification ochre-coloured or brownish
8: Ripening of fruit and seed	89	809	Berries in the first fructification shrivelled, seed dark
8: Ripening of fruit and seed	89	821	Berries in the second fructification still green, seed light-coloured (second order branch)
8: Ripening of fruit and seed	8N .		Ripening of fruit and seed in nth fructification
9: Senescence	91	901	Beginning of leaf yellowing
9: Senescence	93	903	Most of the leaves yellowish
9: Senescence	95	905	50% of the leaves brownish
9: Senescence	97	907	Leaves and stem dead, stems bleached and dry
9: Senescence	99	909	Harvested product

1 For second generation sprouts
2 Stem development stops after termination of main stem by an inflorescence. Branches arise from axils of upper leaves of the main stem, exhibiting a sympodial branching pattern
