= Cnaphalocrocis medinalis =

Scientific classification
- Kingdom: Animalia
- Phylum: Arthropoda
- Clade: Pancrustacea
- Class: Insecta
- Order: Lepidoptera
- Family: Crambidae
- Genus: Cnaphalocrocis
- Species: C. medinalis

Binomial name
- Cnaphalocrocis medinalis (Guenée, 1854)

Synonyms
- Salbia medinalis Guenée, 1854; Botys nurscialis Walker, 1859

Species of moth

Cnaphalocrocis medinalis, the rice leafroller, is a species of moth of the family Crambidae. It is found in south-east Asia, including Hong Kong, Sri Lanka, Taiwan, Thailand and most of Australia.

This moth typically has a wingspan of approximately 16 millimeters.

Its larvae are recognized as pests of various crops, including Oryza sativa, Zea mays, and Triticum, Saccharum and Sorghum species.

The adult moth is characterized by its vibrant yellow or straw coloration, with distinct wavy lines visible on its forewings and hindwings. Eggs are usually laid individually or in groups on the undersides of leaves, appearing scaly and white. A female moth can lay around 56 eggs, with an incubation period lasting between 4 and 8 days. Larvae go through 5 to 6 instars over a period of approximately 22 to 23 days before pupating within folded leaves for about 6 to 7 days. Fully grown caterpillars are green and measure around 16.5 millimeters in length. The entire life cycle of this moth spans about 5 weeks.

Throughout its life stages, the rice leafroller can cause significant damage to crops. Newly hatched caterpillars initiate damage by cutting leaf edges and folding them. In the case of young seedlings, they may fold multiple adjacent leaves and consume the green tissue, leaving affected leaves with a whitish appearance. A single caterpillar can damage numerous leaves, leading to reduced plant vigor and eventual crop yield loss, which can range from 10% to 50%. This pest poses a more severe threat during the boot leaf stage of crop development.

== Feature Description ==
The eggs of the rice leafroller are typically elliptical and flat, measuring about 1 millimeter in length. Initially, they appear milky white, later transitioning to a yellow-brown hue with a visible black spot before hatching.

Larvae of the rice leafroller typically undergo five instars. When mature, they measure between 15 and 18 millimeters in length. They have a brown head, the thorax and abdomen are green at first, then become yellowish-green, and reddish brown when they are mature. There are two spiral-shaped black lines at the posterior margin of the tergum of the front thorax and 8 distinct small black circles at the tergum of the middle and posterior thorax, among which there were six leading edges and two trailing edges.

Pupae of the rice leafroller measure approximately 9 millimeters in length. The 5th to 7th abdominal segments near the leading edge exhibit a single line of dark brown fine hair. The tail tip of the pupa possesses eight barbs, and the pupa is enclosed within a white, thin cocoon.

Adult rice leafrollers typically measure between 7 and 9 millimeters in length, with a wingspan ranging from 13 to 18 millimeters. They exhibit a flaxen coloration, with three brown transverse belts on the prothorax, one of which is relatively coarse and short. Male moths feature a shining and concave eyespot on the central part of the prothorax's leading edge, whereas female moths lack this eyespot.

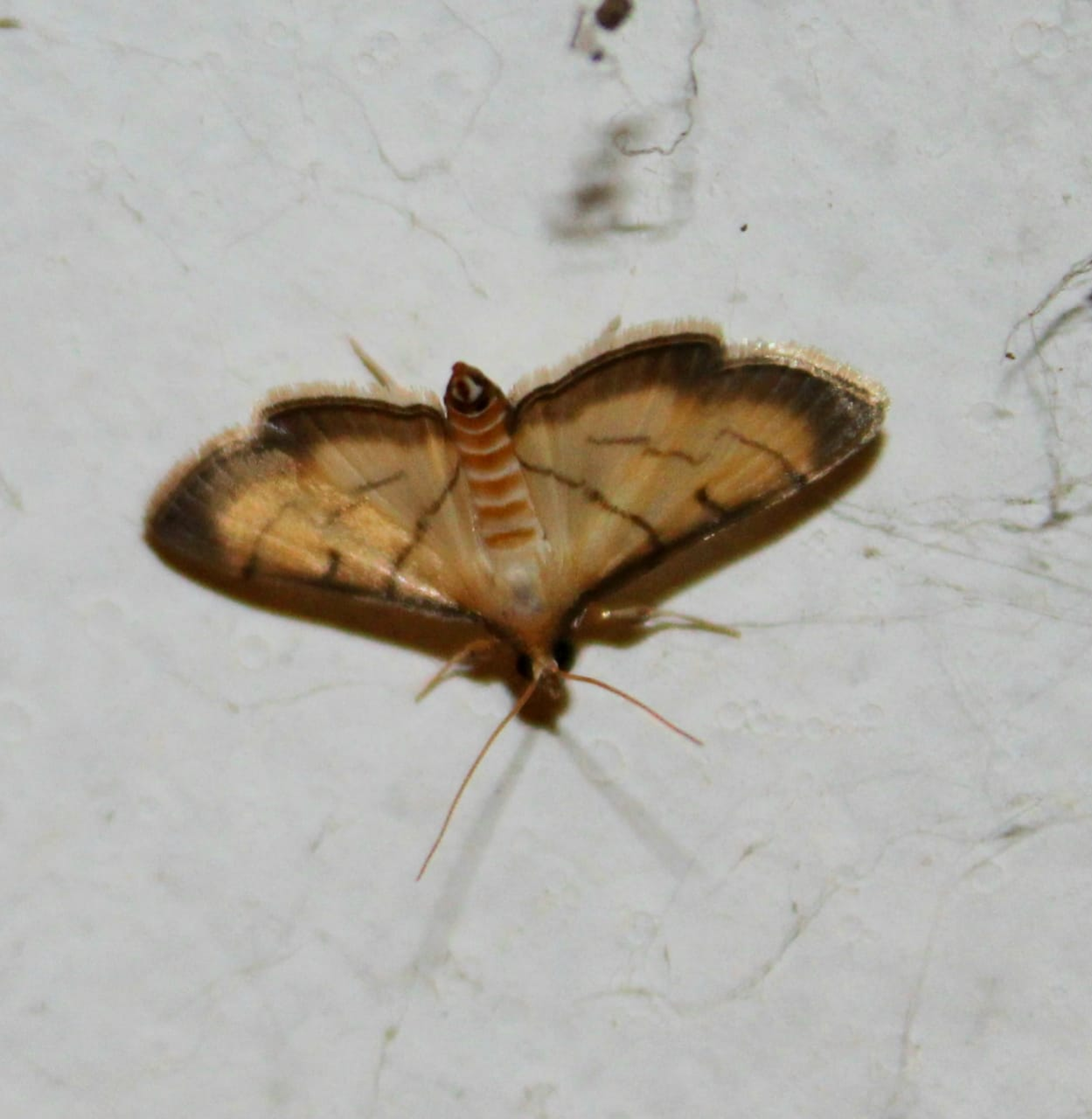

== Pest Impact ==
Rice leafrollers are harmful at the stage of larva. A single larva can consume approximately 25 square centimetres (4 in^{2}) of leaf tissue, constituting less than 40% of a normal leaf of rice. Generally, the 1st-instar larva crawled into the heart leaf or the leaf sheath nearby, and the 2nd-instar larva began to spin silk at the leaf tip, and then began to turn into a small insect bud after the 3rd-instar. The food intake at 4th and 5th instar, which accounting for more than 90% of the total food intake of the larva. Although, there are some differences between different generations.

Rice (Oryza sativa L.) is the most important staple food for more than half of the world population including India. It is grown on an estimated 41.85 million hectares (103.4 million acres) in India with a production of 102 million metric tons (112 million short tons). Insect pests inflict an average of 21%–51% yield loss in rice, which leads to one of the major reasons for poorer crop productivity in India. The leaf folder infestation may cause more than 50% of leaf damage with significant yield losses.

== Methods of pest control ==
=== Cultural Control ===
Reform the tillage system and cultivation system, rational fertilization, avoid the early growth of rice, late ripening. Also, the damage of rice leaf roller could be reduced by avoiding early, middle and late rice mixed cropping. It is also possible to reduce the damage of pests through variety layout, setting up trapping and killing fields and reducing application area. It is also possible to harvest early rice according to the growth rate of the leaf roller, and then kill some larvae and pupae in deep water, so as to reduce the birth rate of the next generation.

=== Physical and Mechanical Control ===
Because rice leaf roller has phototaxis, it has a strong tendency to approach metal halogen lamps, and farmers can use light to lure and kill pests. Lure insect lamp has the advantage of quick, effective, and simple operation. It rarely requires medicament, and does not cause environmental pollution.

=== Biological Control ===
Application of chemical pesticide results in drag resistance and re-occurrence of the pests, and also kills natural predators of the pests. However, natural predators can effectively control the pest. It is estimated that there are more than 130 natural predators of rice leaf roller. Therefore, the protection and utilization of natural predators is very important to improve the sustainability of rice pest management.

=== Chemical Control ===
Bt crops are effective. According to different generations, the use of pesticides should be reasonably arranged and used alternately to prevent the resistance of rice leaf roller.
