= BBCH-scale (cucurbit) =

Scale for describing the phenological development of cucurbits

In biology, the BBCH-scale for cucurbits describes the phenological development of cucurbits, such as cucumber, melon, pumpkin, marrow, squash, calabash and watermelon, using the BBCH-scale.

The phenological growth stages and BBCH-identification keys of cucurbits are:

| Growth stage | Code | | Description |
| Growth stage | 2 digits | 3 digits | Description |
|---|---|---|---|
| 0: Germination | 00 | 000 | Dry seed |
| 0: Germination | 01 | 001 | Beginning of seed imbibition |
| 0: Germination | 03 | 003 | Seed imbibition complete |
| 0: Germination | 05 | 005 | Radicle emerged from seed |
| 0: Germination | 07 | 007 | Hypocotyl with cotyledons breaking through seed coat |
| 0: Germination | 09 | 009 | Emergence: cotyledons break through soil surface |
| 1: Leaf development | 10 | 100 | Cotyledons completely unfolded |
| 1: Leaf development | 11 | 101 | First true leaf on main stem fully unfolded |
| 1: Leaf development | 12 | 102 | 2nd true leaf on main stem unfolded |
| 1: Leaf development | 13 | 103 | 3rd true leaf on main stem unfolded |
| 1: Leaf development | 1 . | 10 . | Stages continuous till ... |
| 1: Leaf development | 19 | 109 | 9 or more leaves on main stem unfolded (2digit) 9th leaf unfolded on main stem (3digit) |
| 1: Leaf development | – | 110 | 10th leaf on main stem unfolded |
| 1: Leaf development | – | 11 . | Stages continuous till ... |
| 1: Leaf development | – | 119 | 19th leaf on main stem unfolded |
| 2: Formation of side shoots | 21 | 201 | First primary side shoot visible |
| 2: Formation of side shoots | 22 | 202 | 2nd primary side shoot visible |
| 2: Formation of side shoots | 2 . | 20 . | Stages continuous till ... |
| 2: Formation of side shoots | 29 | 209 | 9 or more primary side shoots visible |
| 2: Formation of side shoots | – | 221 | First secondary side shoot visible |
| 2: Formation of side shoots | – | 22 . | Stages continuous till ... |
| 2: Formation of side shoots | – | 229 | 9th secondary side shoot visible |
| 2: Formation of side shoots | – | 231 | First tertiary side shoot visible |
| 5: Inflorescence emergence | 51 | 501 | First flower initial with elongated ovary visible on main stem |
| 5: Inflorescence emergence | 52 | 502 | 2nd flower initial with elongated ovary visible on main stem |
| 5: Inflorescence emergence | 53 | 503 | 3rd flower initial with elongated ovary visible on main stem |
| 5: Inflorescence emergence | 5 . | 50 . | Stages continuous till ... |
| 5: Inflorescence emergence | 59 | 509 | 9 or more flower initials with elongated ovary already visible on main stem |
| 5: Inflorescence emergence | – | 510 | 10 or more flower initials with elongated ovary already visible on main stem |
| 5: Inflorescence emergence | – | 51 . | Stages continuous till ... |
| 5: Inflorescence emergence | – | 519 | 19 ore more flower initials with elongated ovary already visible on main stem |
| 5: Inflorescence emergence | – | 521 | First flower initial visible on a secondary side shoot |
| 5: Inflorescence emergence | – | 531 | First flower initial visible on a tertiary side shoot |
| 6: Flowering | 61 | 601 | First flower open on main stem |
| 6: Flowering | 62 | 602 | 2nd flower open on main stem |
| 6: Flowering | 63 | 603 | 3rd flower open on main stem |
| 6: Flowering | 6 . | 60 . | Stages continuous till ... |
| 6: Flowering | 69 | 609 | 9th flower open on main stem or 9 flowers on main stem already open |
| 6: Flowering | – | 610 | 10th flower open on main stem or 10 flowers on main stem already open |
| 6: Flowering | – | 61 . | Stages continuous till ... |
| 6: Flowering | – | 619 | 19th flower open on man stem ore more than 19 flowers on main stem already open |
| 6: Flowering | – | 621 | First flower on secondary side shoot open |
| 6: Flowering | – | 631 | First flower on tertiary side shoot open |
| 7: Development of fruit | 71 | 701 | First fruit on main stem has reached typical size and form |
| 7: Development of fruit | 72 | 702 | 2nd fruit on main stem has reached typical size and form |
| 7: Development of fruit | 73 | 703 | 3rd fruit on main stem has reached typical size and form |
| 7: Development of fruit | 7 . | 70 . | Stages continuous till ... |
| 7: Development of fruit | 79 | 709 | 9 or more fruits on main stem has reached typical size and form |
| 7: Development of fruit | – | 721 | First fruit on a secondary side shoot has reached typical size and form |
| 7: Development of fruit | – | 731 | First fruit on a tertiary side shoot has reached typical size and form |
| 8: Ripening of fruit and seed | 81 | 801 | 10% of fruits show typical fully ripe colour |
| 8: Ripening of fruit and seed | 82 | 802 | 20% of fruits show typical fully ripe colour |
| 8: Ripening of fruit and seed | 83 | 803 | 30% of fruits show typical fully ripe colour |
| 8: Ripening of fruit and seed | 84 | 804 | 40% of fruits show typical fully ripe colour |
| 8: Ripening of fruit and seed | 85 | 805 | 50% of fruits show typical fully ripe colour |
| 8: Ripening of fruit and seed | 86 | 806 | 60% of fruits show typical fully ripe colour |
| 8: Ripening of fruit and seed | 87 | 807 | 70% of fruits show typical fully ripe colour |
| 8: Ripening of fruit and seed | 88 | 808 | 80% of fruits show typical fully ripe colour |
| 8: Ripening of fruit and seed | 89 | 809 | Fully ripe: fruits have typical fully ripe colour |
| 9: Senescence | 97 | 907 | Plants dead |
| 9: Senescence | 99 | 909 | Harvested product (seeds) |
