= BBCH-scale (cotton) =

Scale for phenological development of cotton plants

In biology, the BBCH-scale for cotton describes the phenological development of cotton plants Gossypium hirsutum using the BBCH-scale.

The phenological growth stages and BBCH-identification keys of cotton are:

| Growth stage | Code | Description |
|---|---|---|
| 0: Germination | 00 | Dry seed |
| 0: Germination | 01 | Beginning of seed imbibition |
| 0: Germination | 03 | Seed imbibition complete |
| 0: Germination | 05 | Radicle emerged from seed |
| 0: Germination | 06 | Elongation of radicle |
| 0: Germination | 07 | Hypocotyl with cotyledons breaking through seed coat |
| 0: Germination | 08 | Hypocotyl with cotyledons growing towards soil surface |
| 0: Germination | 09 | Emergence: hypocotyl with cotyledons breaking through soil surface ("crook stage") |
| 1: Leaf development (Main shoot) | 10 | Cotyledons completely unfolded^{1} |
| 1: Leaf development (Main shoot) | 11 | First true leaf unfolded^{1} |
| 1: Leaf development (Main shoot) | 12 | 2nd true leaf unfolded^{1} |
| 1: Leaf development (Main shoot) | 13 | 3rd true leaf unfolded^{1} |
| 1: Leaf development (Main shoot) | 1 . | Stages continuous till ... |
| 1: Leaf development (Main shoot) | 19 | 9 or more true leaves unfolded;1 no side shoots visible^{2} |
| 2: Formation of side shoots^{3} | 21 | First vegetative side shoot (2nd order) visible |
| 2: Formation of side shoots^{3} | 22 | 2 vegetative side shoots (2nd order) visible |
| 2: Formation of side shoots^{3} | 23 | 3 vegetative side shoots (2nd order) visible |
| 2: Formation of side shoots^{3} | 2 . | Stages continuous till ... |
| 2: Formation of side shoots^{3} | 29 | 9 or more vegetative side shoots (2nd order) visible |
| 3: Main stem elongation (Crop cover) | 31 | Beginning of crop cover: 10% of plants meet between rows |
| 3: Main stem elongation (Crop cover) | 32 | 20% of plants meet between rows |
| 3: Main stem elongation (Crop cover) | 33 | 30% of plants meet between rows |
| 3: Main stem elongation (Crop cover) | 34 | 40% of plants meet between rows |
| 3: Main stem elongation (Crop cover) | 35 | 50% of plants meet between rows |
| 3: Main stem elongation (Crop cover) | 36 | 60% of plants meet between rows |
| 3: Main stem elongation (Crop cover) | 37 | 70% of plants meet between rows |
| 3: Main stem elongation (Crop cover) | 38 | 80% of plants meet between rows |
| 3: Main stem elongation (Crop cover) | 39 | Canopy closure: 90% of the plants meet between rows |
| 5: Inflorescence emergence (Main shoot) | 51 | First floral buds detectable ("pin-head square")^{4} |
| 5: Inflorescence emergence (Main shoot) | 52 | First floral buds visible ("match-head square")^{4} |
| 5: Inflorescence emergence (Main shoot) | 55 | Floral buds distinctly enlarged |
| 5: Inflorescence emergence (Main shoot) | 59 | Petals visible: floral buds still closed |
| 6: Flowering | 60 | First flowers opened (sporadically within the population) |
| 6: Flowering | 61 | Beginning of flowering ("Early bloom"): 5–6 blooms / 25 ft of row (= 5–6 blooms / 7.5 meter of row) |
| 6: Flowering | 65 | Full flowering: ("Mid bloom"): 11 and more blooms / 25 ft of row = 11 and more blooms / 7.5 meter of row |
| 6: Flowering | 67 | Flowering finishing: majority of flowers faded ("Late bloom") |
| 6: Flowering | 69 | End of flowering |
| 7: Development of fruits and seeds | 71 | About 10% of bolls have attained their final size |
| 7: Development of fruits and seeds | 72 | About 20% of bolls have attained their final size |
| 7: Development of fruits and seeds | 73 | About 30% of bolls have attained their final size |
| 7: Development of fruits and seeds | 74 | About 40% of bolls have attained their final size |
| 7: Development of fruits and seeds | 75 | About 50% of bolls have attained their final size |
| 7: Development of fruits and seeds | 76 | About 60% of bolls have attained their final size |
| 7: Development of fruits and seeds | 77 | About 70% of bolls have attained their final size |
| 7: Development of fruits and seeds | 78 | About 80% of bolls have attained their final size |
| 7: Development of fruits and seeds | 79 | About 90% of bolls have attained their final size |
| 8: Ripening of fruits and seeds | 80 | First open bolls on the first fruiting branches |
| 8: Ripening of fruits and seeds | 81 | Beginning of boll opening: about 10% of bolls open. Nodes Above White Flower (NAWF) |
| 8: Ripening of fruits and seeds | 82 | About 20% of bolls open |
| 8: Ripening of fruits and seeds | 83 | About 30% of bolls open. Nodes Above Cracked Boll (NACB) |
| 8: Ripening of fruits and seeds | 84 | About 40% of bolls open |
| 8: Ripening of fruits and seeds | 85 | About 50% of bolls open |
| 8: Ripening of fruits and seeds | 86 | About 60% of bolls open |
| 8: Ripening of fruits and seeds | 87 | About 70% of bolls open |
| 8: Ripening of fruits and seeds | 88 | About 80% of bolls open |
| 8: Ripening of fruits and seeds | 89 | About 90% of bolls open |
| 9: Senescence | 91 | About 10% of leaves discoloured or fallen |
| 9: Senescence | 92 | About 20% of leaves discoloured or fallen |
| 9: Senescence | 93 | About 30% of leaves discoloured or fallen |
| 9: Senescence | 94 | About 40% of leaves discoloured or fallen |
| 9: Senescence | 95 | About 50% of leaves discoloured or fallen |
| 9: Senescence | 96 | About 60% of leaves discoloured or fallen |
| 9: Senescence | 97 | Above ground parts of plant dead; plant dormant |
| 9: Senescence | 99 | Harvested product (bolls and seeds) |

1 Leaves are counted from the cotyledon node (= node 0)
2 Side shoot development may occur earlier, if there is a vegetative side shoot continue with principal growth stage 2. If there is a reproductive side shoot (fruiting branch) continue with the principal growth stage 5
3 Vegetative side shoots are counted from the cotyledon node
4 "pin-head square" or "match-head square" is the first square which forms at the first fruiting position of the first fruiting branch
