= BBCH-scale (peanut) =

Scale for describing the phenological development of peanuts

In biology, the BBCH-scale for peanut describes the phenological development of peanuts using the BBCH-scale.

The phenological growth stages and BBCH-identification keys of peanuts are:

Growth stage	Code	Description
0: Germination	00	Dry seed
0: Germination	01	Beginning of seed imbibition
0: Germination	03	Seed imbibition complete
0: Germination	05	Radicle emerged from seed
0: Germination	07	Hypocotyl with cotyledons breaking through seed coat
0: Germination	08	Hypocotyl reaches the soil surface; hypocotyl arch visible
0: Germination	09	Emergence: hypocotyl with cotyledons arising above soil surface (“cracking stage”)
1: Leaf development (main shoot)	10	Cotyledons completely unfolded^{1}
1: Leaf development (main shoot)	11	First true leaf (pinnate) unfolded^{1}
1: Leaf development (main shoot)	12	2nd true leaf (pinnate) unfolded^{1}
1: Leaf development (main shoot)	13	3rd true leaf (pinnate) unfolded^{1}
1: Leaf development (main shoot)	1 .	Stages continuous till ...
1: Leaf development (main shoot)	19	9 or more true leaves unfolded.1 No side shoots visible^{2}
2: Formation of side shoots^{3}	21	1st side shoot visible
2: Formation of side shoots^{3}	22	2nd side shoot visible
2: Formation of side shoots^{3}	23	3rd side shoot visible
2: Formation of side shoots^{3}	2 .	Stages continuous till ...
2: Formation of side shoots^{3}	29	9 or more side shoots visible
3: Main stem elongation (Crop cover)	31	Beginning of crop cover: 10% of plants meets between rows
3: Main stem elongation (Crop cover)	32	20% of plants meets between rows
3: Main stem elongation (Crop cover)	33	30% of plants meets between rows
3: Main stem elongation (Crop cover)	34	40% of plants meets between rows
3: Main stem elongation (Crop cover)	35	50% of plants meets between rows
3: Main stem elongation (Crop cover)	36	60% of plants meets between rows
3: Main stem elongation (Crop cover)	37	70% of plants meets between rows
3: Main stem elongation (Crop cover)	38	80% of plants meets between rows
3: Main stem elongation (Crop cover)	39	Crop cover complete: 90% of plants meets between rows
5: Inflorescence emergence	51	First inflorescence buds visible
5: Inflorescence emergence	55	First individual flower buds visible
5: Inflorescence emergence	59	First flower petals visible. Flower buds still closed
6: Flowering	61	Beginning of flowering
6: Flowering	62	First carpophore pegs visible
6: Flowering	63	Continuation of flowering
6: Flowering	64	First carpophore pegs visibly elongated
6: Flowering	65	Full flowering
6: Flowering	66	First carpophore pegs penetrating the soil
6: Flowering	67	Flowering declining^{4}
6: Flowering	68	Tip of first carpophore pegs growing horizontally in the soil
6: Flowering	69	End of flowering^{4}
7: Development of fruits and seeds	71	Beginning of pod development: tip of first carpophore pegs swollen (at least twice the original diameter)
7: Development of fruits and seeds	73	Continuation of pod development: beginning of pod filling: first pods have attained final size and are ripening
7: Development of fruits and seeds	75	Main phase of pod development: continuation of pod filling
7: Development of fruits and seeds	77	Advanced pod filling
7: Development of fruits and seeds	79	Fresh seeds fill the cavity of the pods which have attained their final size
8: Ripening of fruits and seeds^{5}	81	Beginning of ripening: about 10% of pods developed to final size are ripe
8: Ripening of fruits and seeds^{5}	82	About 20% of pods developed to final size are ripe
8: Ripening of fruits and seeds^{5}	83	Continuation of ripening: about 30% of pods developed to final size are ripe
8: Ripening of fruits and seeds^{5}	84	About 40% of pods developed to final size are ripe
8: Ripening of fruits and seeds^{5}	85	Main phase of ripening: about 50% of pods developed to final size are ripe
8: Ripening of fruits and seeds^{5}	86	About 60% of pods developed to final size are ripe
8: Ripening of fruits and seeds^{5}	87	Advanced ripening: about 70% of pods developed to final size are ripe
8: Ripening of fruits and seeds^{5}	88	About 80% of pods developed to final size are ripe
8: Ripening of fruits and seeds^{5}	89	Full maturity: nearly all pods developed to final size are ripe
9: Senescence	91	About 10% of above ground parts of plant dry
9: Senescence	92	About 40% of above ground parts of plant dry
9: Senescence	93	About 30% of above ground parts of plant dry
9: Senescence	94	About 40% of above ground parts of plant dry
9: Senescence	95	About 50% of above ground parts of plant dry
9: Senescence	96	About 60% of above ground parts of plant dry
9: Senescence	97	Above ground parts of plant dead
9: Senescence	99	Harvested product

1 Leaves are counted from the cotyledon node (= node 0)
2 Side shoot development may occur earlier; in this case continue with principal growth stage 2
4 Only for varieties with a determinate flowering period
5 Criteria of maturity: Pericarp hard, with distinct texture, can be split open easily;
