= BBCH-scale (sunflower) =

The BBCH-scale (sunflower) identifies the phenological development stages of the sunflower (Helianthus annuus). It is a plant species specific version of the BBCH-scale.

Phenological growth stages and BBCH-identification keys of sunflower
Code	Description
Principal growth stage 0: Germination
00	Dry seed (achene)
01	Beginning of seed imbibition
03	Seed imbibition complete
05	Radicle emerged from seed
06	Radicle elongated, root hairs developing
07	Hypocotyl with cotyledons emerged from seed
08	Hypocotyl with cotyledons growing towards soil surface
09	Emergence: cotyledons emerge through soil surface
Principal growth stage 1: Leaf development^{1}
10	Cotyledons completely unfolded
12	2 leaves (first pair) unfolded
14	4 leaves (second pair) unfolded
15	5 leaves unfolded
16	6 leaves unfolded
17	7 leaves unfolded
18	8 leaves unfolded
19	9 or more leaves unfolded
Principal growth stage 3: Stem elongation
30	Beginning of stem elongation
31	1 visibly extended internode
32	2 visibly extended internodes
33	3 visibly extended internodes
3 .	Stages continuous till ...
39	9 or more visibly extended internodes
Principal growth stage 5: Inflorescence emergence
51	Inflorescence just visible between youngest leaves
53	Inflorescence separating from youngest leaves, bracts distinguishable from foliage leaves
55	Inflorescence separated from youngest foliage leaf
57	Inflorescence clearly separated from foliage leaves
59	Ray florets visible between the bracts; inflorescence still closed
Principal growth stage 6: Flowering
61	Beginning of flowering: ray florets extended, disc florets visible in outer third of inflorescence
63	Disc florets in outer third of inflorescence in bloom (stamens and stigmata visible)
65	Full flowering: disc florets in middle third of inflorescence in bloom (stames and stigmata visible)
67	Flowering declining: disc florets in inner third of inflorescence in bloom (stames and stigmata visible)
69	End of flowering: most disc florets have finished flowering, ray florets dry or fallen
Principal growth stage 7: Development of fruit
71	Seeds on outer edge of the inflorescence are grey and have reached final size
73	Seeds on outer third of the inflorescence are grey and have reached final size
75	Seeds on middle third of the inflorescence are grey and have reached final size
79	Seeds on inner third of the inflorescence are grey and have reached final size
Principal growth stage 8: Ripening
80	Beginning of ripening: seeds on outer third of anthocarp black and hard. Back of anthocarp still green
81	Seeds on outer third of anthocarp dark and hard. Back of anthocarp still green
83	Dark of anthocarp yellowish-green, bracts still green. Seeds about 50% dry matter
85	Seeds on middle third of anthocarp dark and hard. Back of anthocarp yellow, bracts brown edged. Seeds about 60% dry matter
87	Physiological ripeness: back of the anthocarp yellow. Bracts marbled brown. Seeds about 75–80% dry matter
89	Fully ripe: seeds on inner third of anthocarp dark and hard. Back of anthocarp brown. Bracts brown. Seeds about 85% dry matter
Principal growth stage 9:
92	Over ripe, seeds over 90% dry matter
97	Plant dead and dry
99	Harvested product

1 Stem elongation may occur earlier than stage 19; in this case continue with the principal stage 3
