= BBCH-scale (bean) =

In biology, the BBCH-scale for beans describes the phenological development of bean plants using the BBCH-scale.

The phenological growth stages and BBCH-identification keys of bean are:

Growth stage	Code	Description
0: Germination	00	Dry seed
0: Germination	01	Beginning of seed imbibition
0: Germination	03	Seed imbibition complete
0: Germination	05	Radicle emerged from seed
0: Germination	07	Hypocotyl with cotyledons breaking through seed coat
0: Germination	08	Hypocotyl reaches the soil surface; hypocotyl arch visible
0: Germination	09	Emergence: hypocotyl with cotyledons break through soil surface ("cracking stage")
1: Leaf development	10	Cotyledons completely unfolded
1: Leaf development	12	2 full leaves (first leaf pair unfolded)
1: Leaf development	13	3rd true leaf (first trifoliate leaf) unfolded
1: Leaf development	1 .	Stages continuous till ...
1: Leaf development	19	9 or more leaves (2 full leaves, 7 or more trifoliate) unfolded
2: Formation of side shoots	21	First side shoot visible
2: Formation of side shoots	22	2nd side shoot visible
2: Formation of side shoots	23	3rd side shoot visible
2: Formation of side shoots	2 .	Stages continuous till ...
2: Formation of side shoots	29	9 or more side shoots visible
5: Inflorescence emergence	51	First flower buds visible
5: Inflorescence emergence	55	First flower buds enlarged
5: Inflorescence emergence	59	First petals visible, flowers still closed
6: Flowering	60	First flowers open (sporadically within the population)
6: Flowering	61	Beginning of flowering: 10% of flowers open^{1} Beginning of flowering^{2}
6: Flowering	62	20% of flowers open^{1}
6: Flowering	63	30% of flowers open^{1}
6: Flowering	64	40% of flowers open^{1}
6: Flowering	65	Full flowering: 50% of flowers open^{1} Main flowering period^{2}
6: Flowering	67	Flowering finishing: majority of petals fallen or dry1
6: Flowering	69	End of flowering: first pods visible^{1}
7: Development of fruit	71	10% of pods have reached typical length^{1} Beginning of pot development^{2}
7: Development of fruit	72	20% of pods have reached typical length^{1}
7: Development of fruit	73	30% of pods have reached typical length^{1}
7: Development of fruit	74	40% of pods have reached typical length^{1}
7: Development of fruit	75	50% of pods have reached typical length, beans beginning to fill out^{1} Main pod development period^{2}
7: Development of fruit	76	60% of pods have reached typical length^{1}
7: Development of fruit	77	70% of pods have reached typical length, pods still break cleanly^{1}
7: Development of fruit	78	80% of pods have reached typical length^{1}
7: Development of fruit	79	Pods: individual beans easily visible^{1}
8: Ripening of fruit and seed	81	10% of pods ripe (beans hard)1 Seeds beginning to mature^{2}
8: Ripening of fruit and seed	82	20% of pods ripe (beans hard)^{1}
8: Ripening of fruit and seed	83	30% of pods ripe (beans hard)^{1}
8: Ripening of fruit and seed	84	40% of pods ripe (beans hard)^{1}
8: Ripening of fruit and seed	85	50% of pods ripe (beans hard)^{1} Main period of ripening2
8: Ripening of fruit and seed	86	60% of pods ripe (beans hard)^{1}
8: Ripening of fruit and seed	87	70% of pods ripe (beans hard)^{1}
8: Ripening of fruit and seed	88	80% of pods ripe (beans hard)^{1}
8: Ripening of fruit and seed	89	Fully ripe: pods ripe (beans hard)^{1}
9: Senescence	97	Plants dead
9: Senescence	99	Harvested product

1 For varieties with limited flowering period
2 For varieties in which the flowering period is not limited
