= BBCH-scale (beet) =

In biology, the BBCH-scale for beet describes the phenological development of beet plants using the BBCH-scale.

The phenological growth stages and BBCH-identification keys of beet are:

Growth stage	Code	Description
0: Germination	00	Dry seed
0: Germination	01	Beginning of imbibition: seeds begins to take up water
0: Germination	03	Seed imbibition complete (pellet cracked)
0: Germination	05	Radicle emerged from seed (pellet)
0: Germination	07	Shoot emerged from seed (pellet)
0: Germination	09	Emergence: shoot emerges through soil surface
1: Leaf development (youth stage)	10	First leaf visible (pinhead-size): cotyledons horizontally unfolded
1: Leaf development (youth stage)	11	First pair of leaves visible, not yet unfolded (pea-size)
1: Leaf development (youth stage)	12	2 leaves (first pair of leaves) unfolded
1: Leaf development (youth stage)	14	4 leaves (2nd pair of leaves) unfolded
1: Leaf development (youth stage)	15	5 leaves unfolded
1: Leaf development (youth stage)	1 .	Stages continuous till ...
1: Leaf development (youth stage)	19	9 and more leaves unfolded
3: Rosette growth (crop cover)	31	Beginning of crop cover: leaves cover 10% of ground
3: Rosette growth (crop cover)	32	Leaves cover 20% of ground
3: Rosette growth (crop cover)	33	Leaves cover 30% of ground
3: Rosette growth (crop cover)	34	Leaves cover 40% of ground
3: Rosette growth (crop cover)	35	Leaves cover 50% of ground
3: Rosette growth (crop cover)	36	Leaves cover 60% of ground
3: Rosette growth (crop cover)	37	Leaves cover 70% of ground
3: Rosette growth (crop cover)	38	Leaves cover 80% of ground
3: Rosette growth (crop cover)	39	Crop cover complete: leaves cover 90% of ground
4: Development of harvestable vegetative plant parts Beet root	49	Beet root has reached harvestable size
5: Inflorescence emergence (2nd year of growth)	51	Beginning of elongation of main stem
5: Inflorescence emergence (2nd year of growth)	52	Main stem 20 cm long
5: Inflorescence emergence (2nd year of growth)	53	Side shoot buds visible on main stem
5: Inflorescence emergence (2nd year of growth)	54	Side shoots clearly visible on main stem
5: Inflorescence emergence (2nd year of growth)	55	First individual flower buds on side shoots visible
5: Inflorescence emergence (2nd year of growth)	59	First bracts visible; flower buds still closed
6: Flowering	60	First flowers open
6: Flowering	61	Beginning of flowering: 10% of flowers open
6: Flowering	62	20% of flowers open
6: Flowering	63	30% of flowers open
6: Flowering	64	40% of flowers open
6: Flowering	65	Full flowering: 50% of flowers open
6: Flowering	67	Flowering declining: 70% of flowers open or dry
6: Flowering	69	End of flowering: all flowers dry, fruit set visible
7: Development of fruit	71	Beginning of seed development: seeds visible in infructescence
7: Development of fruit	75	Pericarp green; fruit still mouldable; perisperm milky; colour of seed coat: beige
8: Ripening	81	Beginning of ripening: pericarp green-brown, seed coat light brown
8: Ripening	85	Pericarp light brown, seed coat reddish brown
8: Ripening	87	Pericarp hard, seed coat dark brown
8: Ripening	89	Fully ripe: seed coat final colour (specific to variety and species), perisperm hard
9: Senescence	91	Beginning of leaf discolouration
9: Senescence	93	Most leaves yellowish
9: Senescence	95	50% of leaves brownish
9: Senescence	97	Leaves dead
9: Senescence	99	Harvested product (seeds)
