= BBCH-scale (currants) =

In biology, the BBCH-scale for currants describes the phenological development of currants, such as blackcurrants and redcurrants, using the BBCH-scale.

The phenological growth stages and BBCH-identification keys of currants are:

Growth stage	Code	Description
0: Sprouting/Bud development	00	Dormancy: leaf buds and the thicker inflorescence buds closed and covered by dark brown scales
0: Sprouting/Bud development	01	Beginning of bud swelling: bud scales elongated
0: Sprouting/Bud development	03	End of bud swelling: edges of bud scales light coloured
0: Sprouting/Bud development	07	Beginning of bud burst: first green or red leaf tips just visible
0: Sprouting/Bud development	09	Leaf tips extended beyond scales
1: Leaf development	10	Leaf tips above the bud scales: first leaves separating
1: Leaf development	11	First leaves unfolded (others still unfolding)
1: Leaf development	15	More leaves unfolded, not yet full size
1: Leaf development	19	First leaves fully expanded
3: Shoot development^{1}	31	Beginning of shoot growth: axes of developing shoots visible
3: Shoot development^{1}	32	Shoots about 20% of final length
3: Shoot development^{1}	33	Shoots about 30% of final length
3: Shoot development^{1}	3 .	Stages continuous till ...
3: Shoot development^{1}	39	Shoots about 90% of final length
5: Inflorescence emergence	51	Inflorescence buds and leaf buds swelling: buds closed, light brown scales visible
5: Inflorescence emergence	53	Bud burst: scales separated light green but sections visible
5: Inflorescence emergence	54	Green or red leaf tips above bud scales
5: Inflorescence emergence	55	First flower buds (compact raceme) visible beside unfolded leaves
5: Inflorescence emergence	56	Beginning of raceme elongation
5: Inflorescence emergence	57	First flower bud separated on elongating raceme
5: Inflorescence emergence	59	Grape stage: all flower buds separated
6: Flowering	60	First flowers open
6: Flowering	61	Beginning of flowering: about 10% of flowers open
6: Flowering	65	Full flowering: at least 50% of flowers open, first petals falling
6: Flowering	67	Flowers fading: majority of petals fallen
6: Flowering	69	End of flowering: all petals fallen
7: Development of fruit	71	Beginning of fruit growth: first fruits visible at raceme base
7: Development of fruit	72	20% of fruits formed
7: Development of fruit	73	30% of fruits formed
7: Development of fruit	74	40% of fruits formed
7: Development of fruit	75	50% of fruits formed
7: Development of fruit	76	60% of fruits formed
7: Development of fruit	77	70% of fruits formed
7: Development of fruit	78	80% of fruits formed
7: Development of fruit	79	90% of fruits formed
8: Maturity of fruit and seed	81	Beginning of ripening: change to cultivar-specific fruit color
8: Maturity of fruit and seed	85	Advanced ripening: first berries at base of racemes have cultivar-specific color
8: Maturity of fruit and seed	87	Fruit ripe for picking: most berries ripe
8: Maturity of fruit and seed	89	Berries at base of racemes tending to drop (beginning of fruit abscission)
9: Senescence, beginning of dormancy	91	Shoot growth completed; terminal bud developed; foliage still fully green
9: Senescence, beginning of dormancy	92	Leaves begin to discolour
9: Senescence, beginning of dormancy	93	Beginning of leaf fall
9: Senescence, beginning of dormancy	95	50% of leaves discoloured or fallen
9: Senescence, beginning of dormancy	97	All leaves fallen
9: Senescence, beginning of dormancy	99	Harvested product
