= BBCH-scale (Musaceae) =

In biology, the BBCH-scale for musaceae describes the phenological development of musaceae using the BBCH-scale.

The phenological growth stages and BBCH-identification keys of musaceae are:

Growth stage	Code			Description
Growth stage	2 digit	3 digit	4 digit	Description
0: Sprouting or emergence	00	000	0000	Recently planted material (plants from tissue cultures and corns) without visible growth
0: Sprouting or emergence	05	005	0005	Emergence of the 1st new leaf in plants from tissue cultures or of the foliar shoot of the corn
1: Leaf development	10	100	1000	Formation of the 1st leaf of the planted corn or the candela leaf in tissue culture plants (candela stage 0)
1: Leaf development	10	100	1002	Leaf 1 at candela stage 2
1: Leaf development	10	100	1004	Leaf 1 at candela stage 4
1: Leaf development	10	100	1006	Leaf l at candela stage 6
1: Leaf development	10	100	1008	Leaf l at candela stage 8
1: Leaf development	11	101	1010	One leaf completely open and the youngest leaf at candela stage 0
1: Leaf development	11	101	1012	One leaf completely open and the youngest leaf at candela stage 2
1: Leaf development	11	101	1014	One leaf completely open and the youngest leaf at candela stage 4
1: Leaf development	11	101	1016	One leaf completely open and the youngest leaf at candela stage 6
1: Leaf development	11	101	1018	One leaf completely open and the youngest leaf at candela stage 8
1: Leaf development	12	102	1020	Two leaves completely open and the youngest leaf at candela stage 0
1: Leaf development	12	102	1022	Two leaves completely open and the youngest leaf at candela stage 2
1: Leaf development	12	102	1024	Two leaves completely open and the youngest leaf at candela stage 4
1: Leaf development	12	102	1026	Two leaves completely open and the youngest leaf at candela stage 6
1: Leaf development	12	102	1028	Two leaves completely open and the youngest leaf at candela stage 8
1: Leaf development	13	103	1030	Three leaves completely open and the youngest leaf at candela stage 0
1: Leaf development	13	103	1032	Three leaves completely open and the youngest leaf at candela stage 2
1: Leaf development	13	103	1034	Three leaves completely open and the youngest leaf at candela stage 4
1: Leaf development	13	103	1036	Three leaves completely open and the youngest leaf at candela stage 6
1: Leaf development	13	103	1038	Three leaves completely open and the youngest leaf at candela stage 8 stages continue till...
1: Leaf development	19	109	1090	9 or more leaves (only 2 digit code ) or nine leaves completely open and the youngest leaf at candela stage 0
1: Leaf development	19	109	1092	Nine leaves completely open and the youngest leaf at candela stage 2
1: Leaf development	19	109	1094	Nine leaves completely open and the youngest leaf at candela stage 4
1: Leaf development	19	109	1096	Nine leaves completely open and the youngest leaf at candela stage 6
1: Leaf development	19	109	1098	Nine leaves completely open and the youngest leaf at candela stage 8 stages continue till...
1: Leaf development	19	119	1190	Nineteen or more leaves completely open and the youngest leaf at candela stage 0
1: Leaf development	19	119	1192	Nineteen or more leaves completely open and the youngest leaf at candela stage 2
1: Leaf development	19	119	1194	Nineteen or more leaves completely open and the youngest leaf at candela stage 4
1: Leaf development	19	119	1196	Nineteen or more leaves completely open and the youngest leaf at candela stage 6
1: Leaf development	19	119	1198	Nineteen or more leaves completely open and the youngest leaf at candela stage 8
2: Sucker formation	21	201	2010	1st sucker with visible leaf
2: Sucker formation	21	201	2011	1st sucker with visible sword leaf
2: Sucker formation	21	201	2012	1st sucker with visible water leaf
2: Sucker formation	22	202	2020	2nd sucker with visible leaf
2: Sucker formation	22	202	2021	2nd sucker with visible sword leaf
2: Sucker formation	22	202	2022	2nd sucker with visible water leaf
2: Sucker formation	23	203	2030	3rd sucker with visible leaf
2: Sucker formation	23	203	2031	3rd sucker with visible sword leaf
2: Sucker formation	23	203	2032	3rd sucker with visible water leaf stages continue till...
2: Sucker formation	29	209	2090	nine or more suckers with visible leaf
2: Sucker formation	29	209	2091	nine or more suckers with visible sword leaf
2: Sucker formation	29	209	2092	nine or more suckers with visible water leaf
3: Pseudostem elongation	35	305	3050	The pseudostem reaches 50% of its typical thickness and length according to the genome or clone
3: Pseudostem elongation	39	309	3090	The maximum length and thickness of the pseudostem are reached according to the genome or clone and the formation of new leaves of normal size has been terminated
4: Leaf development of the sucker (sword sucker)	40	400	4000	Sub-phase of dependent growth: the sucker becomes visible and develops the leaf shoot
4: Leaf development of the sucker (sword sucker)	41	401	4011	Development of the 1st lanceolate leaf
4: Leaf development of the sucker (sword sucker)	41	401	4012	Development of the 2nd lanceolate leaf
4: Leaf development of the sucker (sword sucker)	41	401	4013	Development of the 3rd lanceolate leaf
4: Leaf development of the sucker (sword sucker)	41	401	4014	Development of the 4th lanceolate leaf
4: Leaf development of the sucker (sword sucker)	41	401	4015	Development of the 5th lanceolate leaf
4: Leaf development of the sucker (sword sucker)	41	401	4016	Development of the 6th lanceolate leaf
4: Leaf development of the sucker (sword sucker)	41	401	4017	Development of the 7th lanceolate leaf
4: Leaf development of the sucker (sword sucker)	41	401	4018	Development of the 8th lanceolate leaf
4: Leaf development of the sucker (sword sucker)	41	401	4019	Development of the 9th or more lanceolate leaves
4: Leaf development of the sucker (sword sucker)	45	405	4050	Sub-phase of independent growth: leaves of c. 10 cm width are developed (original leaf/zero leaf/F10)
4: Leaf development of the sucker (sword sucker)	45	405	4051	Development of the 1st leaf of c. 10 cm width
4: Leaf development of the sucker (sword sucker)	45	405	4052	Development of the 2nd leaf of c. 10 cm width
4: Leaf development of the sucker (sword sucker)	45	405	4053	Development of the 3rd leaf of c. 10 cm width
4: Leaf development of the sucker (sword sucker)	45	405	4054	Development of the 4th leaf of c. 10 cm width
4: Leaf development of the sucker (sword sucker)	45	405	4055	Development of the 5th leaf of c. 10 cm width
4: Leaf development of the sucker (sword sucker)	45	405	4056	Development of the 6th leaf of c. 10 cm width
4: Leaf development of the sucker (sword sucker)	45	405	4057	Development of the 7th leaf of c. 10 cm width
4: Leaf development of the sucker (sword sucker)	45	405	4058	Development of the 8th leaf of c. 10 cm width
4: Leaf development of the sucker (sword sucker)	45	405	4059	Development of the 9th or more leaves of c. 10 cm width
4: Leaf development of the sucker (sword sucker)	49	409	4090	End of this phase is reached with the development of the first leaf with characteristics of the genome or clone (length width ratio, leaf surface index). Beginning of synchronised development of "normal" leaves (FM)
5: Emergence of inflorescence	50	500	5000	The development of new normal leaves has been terminated and the flower bract emergence
5: Emergence of inflorescence	51	501	5010	Flower bract at candela stage 2
5: Emergence of inflorescence	52	502	5020	Flower bract at candela stage 4
5: Emergence of inflorescence	53	503	5030	Flower bract at candela stage 6
5: Emergence of inflorescence	54	504	5040	Flower bract at candela stage 8
5: Emergence of inflorescence	55	505	5050	Flower bract completely open
5: Emergence of inflorescence	59	509	5090	Emergence of the last bract leaf or first sterile bract protecting the flower
6: Flowering	60	600	6000	The stage begins with the emergence of the flower protected by the last bract leaf (1st sterile bract)
6: Flowering	61	601	6010	A bract which does not protect any hand of flowers rises (2nd sterile bract) and the rachis or flower stalk takes a pendulum position
6: Flowering	62	602	6020	The bract rises which protects the first hand of female or pistillate flowers
6: Flowering	63	603	6030	The bract rises which protects the second hand of female or pistillate flowers
6: Flowering	64	604	6040	The bract rises which protects the third hand of female or pistillate flowers
6: Flowering	65	605	6050	Full bloom: at least 50% of the hands of females flowers are developed
6: Flowering	69	609	6090	The bracts which protect the hands wither and fall off and the fingers are bent into a direction perpendicular to the rachis
7: Development of the fruit	70	700	7000	At least 50% of the fingers show an upwards curvature and the fruits (fingers) begin to fill
7: Development of the fruit	71	701	7010	Total exposure of the fingers or female flowers (protective bracts fallen off or bent and withered above the hands)
7: Development of the fruit	72	702	7020	The fingers of the hands show the characteristic curvature of the fruit (upwards and almost parallel to the axis or rachis)
7: Development of the fruit	73	703	7030	From the first two hands up to 30% of the hands have reached the maximum thickness of the fruit
7: Development of the fruit	74	704	7040	Up to 40% of the hands have reached the maximum thickness of the fruit
7: Development of the fruit	75	705	7050	Up to 50% of the hands have reached the maximum thickness of the fruit
7: Development of the fruit	76	706	7060	Up to 60% of the hands have reached the maximum thickness of the fruit
7: Development of the fruit	77	707	7070	Up to 70% of the hands have reached the maximum thickness of the fruit
7: Development of the fruit	78	708	7080	Up to 80% of the hands have reached the maximum thickness of the fruit
7: Development of the fruit	79	709	7090	All hands have reached the maximum thickness of the fruit and no hand shows a loss of weight
8: Ripening of the fruit	80	800	8000	Ripening starts when the fruit has reached the maximum thickness, begins to lose weight and shows changes of the colour by which the degrees of maturity are defined
8: Ripening of the fruit	81	801	8010	Degree of maturity 1: green. Normal colour of the fresh fruit
8: Ripening of the fruit	82	802	8020	Degree of maturity 2: tinge of yellow. First modification of colour during the ripening cycle
8: Ripening of the fruit	83	803	8030	Degree of maturity 3: more green than yellow
8: Ripening of the fruit	84	804	8040	Degree of maturity 4: more yellow than green
8: Ripening of the fruit	85	805	8050	Degree of maturity 5: tinge of green
8: Ripening of the fruit	86	806	8060	Degree of maturity 6: all yellow
8: Ripening of the fruit	87	807	8070	Degree of maturity 7: yellow with brown specks. Fruit is completely ripe, has the best flavour and a high nutritive value
8: Ripening of the fruit	88	808	8080	Degree of maturity 8: 20–50% of surface discoloured brown or spoiled
8: Ripening of the fruit	89	809	8090	Degree of maturity 9: More than 50% of the surface of the fruits is discoloured brown and spoiled
Principal stage 9: Senescence and death	90	900	9000	More than 50% of the surface of the fruits are discoloured brown
Principal stage 9: Senescence and death	91	901	9010	The leaves the plant shows have died off acropetally and the male flowers have withered, are necrotic and/or have fallen off
Principal stage 9: Senescence and death	93	903	9030	Total rot and necrosis of the fruits
Principal stage 9: Senescence and death	95	905	9050	Degeneration (necrosis) of the flower
Principal stage 9: Senescence and death	97	907	9070	The sheaths enclosed in the pseudostem become brittle which indicates the beginning of necrosis of the pseudostem. The pseudostem turns to be brown
Principal stage 9: Senescence and death	98	908	9080	Total decomposition of the tissues and fall down of the pseudostem

- Harvested product
- post-harvest or storage treatments take place at stage 99, 909 or 9090
