= BBCH-scale (pea) =

In biology, the BBCH-scale for peas describes the phenological development of peas using the BBCH-scale.

The phenological growth stages and BBCH-identification keys of peas are:

Growth stage	Code	Description
0: Germination	00	Dry seed
0: Germination	01	Beginning of seed imbibition
0: Germination	03	Seed imbibition complete
0: Germination	05	Radicle emerged from seed
0: Germination	07	Shoot breaking through seed coat
0: Germination	08	Shoot growing towards soil surface; hypocotyl arch visible
0: Germination	09	Emergence: shoot breaks through soil surface (“cracking stage”)
1: Leaf development	10	Pair of scale leaves visible
1: Leaf development	11	First true leaf (with stipules) unfolded or first tendril developed
1: Leaf development	12	2 leaves (with stipules) unfolded or 2 tendrils developed
1: Leaf development	13	3 leaves (with stipules) unfolded or 3 tendrils developed
1: Leaf development	1 .	Stages continuous till ...
1: Leaf development	19	9 or more leaves (with stipules) unfolded or 9 or more tendrils developed
3: Stem elongation (Main shoot)	30	Beginning of stem elongation
3: Stem elongation (Main shoot)	31	1 visibly extended internode^{1}
3: Stem elongation (Main shoot)	32	2 visibly extended internodes^{1}
3: Stem elongation (Main shoot)	33	3 visibly extended internodes^{1}
3: Stem elongation (Main shoot)	3 .	Stages continuous till ...
3: Stem elongation (Main shoot)	39	9 or more visibly extended internodes^{1}
5: Inflorescence emergence	51	First flower buds visible outside leaves
5: Inflorescence emergence	55	First separated flower buds visible outside leaves but still closed
5: Inflorescence emergence	59	First petals visible, flowers still closed
6: Flowering	60	First flowers open (sporadically within the population)
6: Flowering	61	Beginning of flowering: 10% of flowers open
6: Flowering	62	20% of flowers open
6: Flowering	63	30% of flowers open
6: Flowering	64	40% of flowers open
6: Flowering	65	Full flowering: 50% of flowers open
6: Flowering	67	Flowering declining
6: Flowering	69	End of flowering
7: Development of fruit	71	10% of pods have reached typical length; juice exudes if pressed
7: Development of fruit	72	20% of pods have reached typical length; juice exudes if pressed
7: Development of fruit	73	30% of pods have reached typical length; juice exudes if pressed.Tenderometer value: 80 TE
7: Development of fruit	74	40% of pods have reached typical length; juice exudes if pressed.Tenderometer value: 95 TE
7: Development of fruit	75	50% of pods have reached typical length; juice exudes if pressed.Tenderometer value: 105 TE
7: Development of fruit	76	60% of pods have reached typical length; juice exudes if pressed.Tenderometer value: 115 TE
7: Development of fruit	77	70% of pods have reached typical length. Tenderometer value: 130 TE
7: Development of fruit	79	Pods have reached typical size (green ripe); peas fully formed
8: Ripening of fruit and seed	81	10% of pods ripe, seeds final colour, dry and hard
8: Ripening of fruit and seed	82	20% of pods ripe, seeds final colour, dry and hard
8: Ripening of fruit and seed	83	30% of pods ripe, seeds final colour, dry and hard
8: Ripening of fruit and seed	84	40% of pods ripe, seeds final colour, dry and hard
8: Ripening of fruit and seed	85	50% of pods ripe, seeds final colour, dry and hard
8: Ripening of fruit and seed	86	60% of pods ripe, seeds final colour, dry and hard
8: Ripening of fruit and seed	87	70% of pods ripe, seeds final colour, dry and hard
8: Ripening of fruit and seed	88	80% of pods ripe, seeds final colour, dry and hard
8: Ripening of fruit and seed	89	Fully ripe: all pods dry and brown. Seeds dry and hard (dry ripe)
9: Senescence	97	Plants dead and dry
9: Senescence	99	Harvested product

1 The first internode extends from the scale leaf node to the first true leaf node
