= BBCH-scale (weed) =

The BBCH-scale (weed) identifies the phenological development stages of weed species. It is a plant species specific version of the BBCH-scale.

D = Dicotyledons
G = Gramineae
M = Monocotyledons
P = Perennial plants
V = Development from vegetative parts or propagated organs
No code letter is used if the description applies to all groups of plants.

Phenological growth stages and BBCH-identification keys of weeds
Code	Plant type	Description
Principal growth stage 0: Germination, sprouting, bud development
00		Dry seed
	V	Perennating or reproductive organs during the resting period (tuber, rhizome, bulb, stolon)
	P	Winter dormancy or resting period
01		Beginning of seed imbibition
	P, V	Beginning of bud swelling
03		Seed imbibition complete
	P, V	End of bud swelling
05		Radicle (root) emerged from seed
	V	Perennating or reproductive organs forming roots
06		Elongation of radicle, formation of root hairs and/or lateral roots
07	G	Coleoptile emerged from caryopsis
	D, M	Hypocotyl with cotyledons or shoot breaking through seed coat
	P, V	Beginning of sprouting or bud breaking
08	D	Hypocotyl with cotyledons or shoot growing towards soil surface
	V	Shoot growing towards soil surface
09	G	Emergence: Coleoptile breaks through soil surface
	D, M	Emergence: Cotyledons break through soil surface (except hypogeal germination);
	V	Emergence: Shoot/Leaf breaks through soil surface
	P	Buds show green tips
Principal growth stage 1: Leaf development (main shoot)
10	G, M	First true leaf emerged from coleoptile
	D	Cotyledons completely unfolded
	P	First leaves separated
11		First true leaf, leaf pair or whorl unfolded
	P	First leaves unfolded
12		2 true leaves, leaf pairs or whorls unfolded
13		3 true leaves, leaf pairs or whorls unfolded
1 .		Stages continuous till ...
19		9 or more true leaves, leaf pairs or whorls unfolded
Principal growth stage 2: Formation of side shoots / tillering
21		First side shoot visible
	G	First tiller visible
22		2 side shoots visible
	G	2 tillers visible
23		3 side shoots visible
	G	3 tillers visible
2 .		Stages continuous till ...
29		9 or more side shoots visible
	G	9 or more tillers visible
Principal growth stage 3: Stem elongation /shoot development (main shoot)
30		Beginning of stem elongation
	G	Beginning of shooting
31		1 visibly extended internode
	G	1 node stage
32		2 visibly extended internode;
	G	2 node stage
33		3 visibly extended internode
	G	3 node stage
3 .		Stages continuous till ...
39		9 or more visibly extended internodes
	G	9 or more nodes
Principal growth stage 4: vegetative propagation / booting (main shoot)
40	V	Vegetative reproductive organs begin to develop (rhizomes, stolons, tubers, runners, bulbs)
41	G	Flag leaf sheath extending
42	V	First young plant visible
43	G	Flag leaf sheath just visibly swollen (mid-boot)
45	G	Flag leaf sheath swollen (late-boot)
47	G	Flag leaf sheath opening
49	V	Constant new development of young plants; vegetative reproductive organs reach final size
	G	First awns visible
Principal growth stage 5: Inflorescence emergence (main shoot) / heading
51		Inflorescence or flower buds visible
	G	Beginning of heading
55		First individual flowers visible (still closed)
	G	Half of inflorescence emerged (middle of heading)
59		First flower petals visible (in petalled forms)
	G	Inflorescence fully emerged (end of heading)
Principal growth stage 6: Flowering (main shoot)
60		First flowers open (sporadically)
61		Beginning of flowering: 10% of flowers open
63		30% of flowers open
65		Full flowering: 50% of flowers open, first petals may be fallen
67		Flowering finishing: majority of petals fallen or dry
69		End of flowering: fruit set visible
Principal growth stage 7: Development of fruit
71		Fruits begin to develop
	G	Caryopsis watery ripe
79		Nearly all fruits have reached final size normal for the species and location
Principal growth stage 8: Ripening or maturity of fruit and seed
81		Beginning of ripening or fruit coloration
89		Fully ripe
Principal growth stage 9: Senescence, beginning of dormancy
97		End of leaf fall, plants or above ground parts dead or dormant;
	P, V	Plant resting or dormant
