= BBCH-scale (canola) =

In biology, the BBCH-scale for canola describes the phenological development of canola plants using the BBCH-scale.

The phenological growth stages and BBCH-identification keys of canola are:

Growth stage	Code	Description
0: Germination	00	Dry seed
0: Germination	01	Beginning of seed imbibition
0: Germination	03	Seed imbibition complete
0: Germination	05	Radicle emerged from seed
0: Germination	07	Hypocotyl with cotyledons emerged from seed
0: Germination	08	Hypocotyl with cotyledons growing towards soil surface
0: Germination	09	Emergence: cotyledons emerge through soil surface
1: Leaf development^{1}
1: Leaf development^{1}	10	Cotyledons completely unfolded
1: Leaf development^{1}	11	First leaf unfolded
1: Leaf development^{1}	12	2 leaves unfolded
1: Leaf development^{1}	13	3 leaves unfolded
1: Leaf development^{1}	1 .	Stages continuous till ...
1: Leaf development^{1}	19	9 or more leaves unfolded
2: Formation of side shoots	20	No side shoots
2: Formation of side shoots	21	Beginning of side shoot development: first side shoot detectable
2: Formation of side shoots	22	2 side shoots detectable
2: Formation of side shoots	23	3 side shoots detectable
2: Formation of side shoots	2 .	Stages continuous till ...
2: Formation of side shoots	29	End of side shoot development: 9 or more side shoots detectable
3: Stem elongation^{2}	30	Beginning of stem elongation: no internodes (“rosette”)
3: Stem elongation^{2}	31	1 visibly extended internode
3: Stem elongation^{2}	32	2 visibly extended internodes
3: Stem elongation^{2}	33	3 visibly extended internodes
3: Stem elongation^{2}	3 .	Stages continuous till ...
3: Stem elongation^{2}	39	9 or more visibly extended internodes
5: Inflorescence emergence	50	Flower buds present, still enclosed by leaves
5: Inflorescence emergence	51	Flower buds visible from above (“green bud”)
5: Inflorescence emergence	52	Flower buds free, level with the youngest leaves
5: Inflorescence emergence	53	Flower buds raised above the youngest leaves
5: Inflorescence emergence	55	Individual flower buds (main inflorescence) visible but still closed
5: Inflorescence emergence	57	Individual flower buds (secondary inflorescences) visible but still closed
5: Inflorescence emergence	59	First petals visible, flower buds still closed (“yellow bud”)
6: Flowering	60	First flowers open
6: Flowering	61	10% of flowers on main raceme open, main raceme elongating
6: Flowering	62	20% of flowers on main raceme open
6: Flowering	63	30% of flowers on main raceme open
6: Flowering	64	40% of flowers on main raceme open
6: Flowering	65	Full flowering: 50% flowers on main raceme open, older petals falling
6: Flowering	67	Flowering declining: majority of petals fallen
6: Flowering	69	End of flowering
7: Development of fruit	71	10% of pods have reached final size
7: Development of fruit	72	20% of pods have reached final size
7: Development of fruit	73	30% of pods have reached final size
7: Development of fruit	74	40% of pods have reached final size
7: Development of fruit	75	50% of pods have reached final size
7: Development of fruit	76	60% of pods have reached final size
7: Development of fruit	77	70% of pods have reached final size
7: Development of fruit	78	80% of pods have reached final size
7: Development of fruit	79	Nearly all pods have reached final size
8: Ripening	80	Beginning of ripening: seed green, filling pod cavity
8: Ripening	81	10% of pods ripe, seeds dark and hard
8: Ripening	82	20% of pods ripe, seeds dark and hard
8: Ripening	83	30% of pods ripe, seeds dark and hard
8: Ripening	84	40% of pods ripe, seeds dark and hard
8: Ripening	85	50% of pods ripe, seeds dark and hard
8: Ripening	86	60% of pods ripe, seeds dark and hard
8: Ripening	87	70% of pods ripe, seeds dark and hard
8: Ripening	88	80% of pods ripe, seeds dark and hard
8: Ripening	89	Fully ripe: nearly all pods ripe, seeds dark and hard
9: Senescence	97	Plant dead and dry
9: Senescence	99	Harvested product

1 Stem elongation may occur earlier than stage 19; in this case continue with stage 20
2 Visibly extended internode n develops between leaf n and leaf n+1
