= BBCH-scale (citrus) =

Scale to describe growth of citrus plants

The BBCH-scale for citrus is a classification system used in biology to describe the phenological development of citrus plants using the BBCH-scale.

The phenological growth stages and BBCH-identification keys of citrus plants are:

Growth stage	Code	Description
0: Sprouting/Bud development	00	Dormancy: leaf and inflorescence buds undifferentiated, closed and covered by green scales
0: Sprouting/Bud development	01	Beginning of bud swelling
0: Sprouting/Bud development	03	End of bud swelling: green scales slightly separated
0: Sprouting/Bud development	07	Beginning of bud burst
0: Sprouting/Bud development	09	Green leaf tips visible
1: Leaf development	10	First leaves separating: green scales slightly open, leaves emerging
1: Leaf development	11	First leaves visible
1: Leaf development	15	More leaves visible, not yet at full size
1: Leaf development	19	First leaves fully expanded
3: Shoot development	31	Beginning of shoot growth: axes of developing shoots visible
3: Shoot development	32	Shoots about 20% of final length
3: Shoot development	39	Shoots about 90% of final length
5: Inflorescence emergence	51	Inflorescence buds swelling: buds closed, light green scales visible
5: Inflorescence emergence	53	Bud burst: scales separated, floral tips visible
5: Inflorescence emergence	55	Flowers visible, still closed (green bud), borne on single or multiflowered leafy or leafless inflorescences
5: Inflorescence emergence	56	Flower petals elongating; sepals covering half corolla (white bud)
5: Inflorescence emergence	57	Sepals open: petal tips visible; flowers with white or purplish petals, still closed
5: Inflorescence emergence	59	Most flowers with petals forming a hollow ball
6: Flowering	60	First flowers open
6: Flowering	61	Beginning of flowering: about 10% of flowers open
6: Flowering	65	Full flowering: 50% of flowers open; first petals falling
6: Flowering	67	Flowers fading: majority of petals fallen
6: Flowering	69	End of flowering: all petals fallen
7: Development of fruit	71	Fruit set; beginning of ovary growth; beginning of fruitlets abscission
7: Development of fruit	72	Green fruit surrounded by sepal crown
7: Development of fruit	73	Some fruits slightly yellow: beginning of physiological fruit drop
7: Development of fruit	74	Fruits about 40% of final size. Dark green fruit: end of physiological fruit drop
7: Development of fruit	79	Fruits about 90% of final size
8: Maturity of fruit	81	Beginning of fruit colouring (colour-break)
8: Maturity of fruit	83	Fruit ripe for picking; fruit has not yet developed variety-specific colour
8: Maturity of fruit	85	Advanced ripening; increase in intensity of variety-specific colour
8: Maturity of fruit	89	Fruit ripe for consumption; fruit has typical taste and firmness; beginning of senescence and fruit abscission
9: Senescence, beginning of dormancy	91	Shoot growth complete; foliage fully green
9: Senescence, beginning of dormancy	93	Beginning of senescence and abscission of old leaves
9: Senescence, beginning of dormancy	97	Winter dormancy period
