= BBCH-scale (stone fruit) =

The BBCH-scale (stone) identifies the phenological development stages of stone fruit (cherry = Prunus cerasus, plum = Prunus domestica ssp. domestica, peach = Prunus persica, apricot = Prunus armeniaca). It is a plant species specific version of the BBCH-scale.

Phenological growth stages and BBCH-identification keys of stone fruit
Code	Description
Principal growth stage 0: Sprouting/Bud development
00	Dormancy: leaf buds and the thicker inflorescence buds closed and covered by dark brown scales
01	Beginning of bud swelling (leaf buds); light brown scales visible, scales with light coloured edges
03	End of leaf bud swelling: scales separated, light green bud sections visible
09	Green leaf tips visible: brown scales fallen, buds enclosed by light green scales
Principal growth stage 1: Leaf development
10	First leaves separating: green scales slightly open, leaves emerging
11	First leaves unfolded, axis of developing shoot visible
19	First leaves fully expanded
Principal growth stage 3: Shoot development^{1}
31	Beginning of shoot growth: axes of developing shoots visible
32	Shoots about 20% of final length
33	Shoots about 30% of final length
3 .	Stages continuous till ...
39	Shoots about 90% of final length
Principal growth stage 5: Inflorescence emergence
51	Inflorescence buds swelling: buds closed, light brown scales visible
53	Bud burst: scales separated, light green bud sections visible
54	Inflorescence enclosed by light green scales, if such scales are formed (not all cultivars)
55	Single flower buds visible (still closed) borne on short stalks, green scales slightly open
56	Flower pedicel elongating; sepals closed; single flowers separating
57	Sepals open: petal tips visible; single flowers with white or pink petals (still closed)
59	Most flowers with petals forming a hollow ball
Principal growth stage 6: Flowering
60	First flowers open
61	Beginning of flowering: about 10% of flowers open
62	About 20% of flowers open
63	About 30% of flowers open
64	About 40% of flowers open
65	Full flowering: at least 50% of flowers open, first petals falling
67	Flowers fading: majority of petals fallen
69	End of flowering: all petals fallen
Principal growth stage 7: Development of fruit
71	Ovary growing; fruit fall after flowering
72	Green ovary surrounded by dying sepal crown, sepals beginning to fall
73	Second fruit fall
75	Fruit about half final size
76	Fruit about 60% of final size
77	Fruit about 70% of final size
78	Fruit about 80% of final size
79	Fruit about 90% of final size
Principal growth stage 8: Maturity of fruit and seed
81	Beginning of fruit colouring
85	Colouring advanced
87	Fruit ripe for picking
89	Fruit ripe for consumption: fruit have typical taste and firmness
Principal growth stage 9: Senescence, beginning of dormancy
91	Shoot growth completed; foliage still fully green
92	Leaves begin to discolour
93	Beginning of leaf fall
95	50% of leaves discoloured or fallen
97	All leaves fallen
99	Harvested product

1 From terminal bud
