= BBCH-scale (hop) =

In biology, the BBCH-scale for hops describes the phenological development of Humulus lupulus (hops) using the BBCH-scale.

The phenological growth stages and BBCH-identification keys of hops are:

Growth stage	Code	Description
0: Sprouting	00	Dormancy: rootstock without shoots (uncut)
0: Sprouting	01	Dormancy: rootstock without shoots (cut)
0: Sprouting	07	Rootstock with shoots (uncut)
0: Sprouting	08	Beginning of shoot-growth (rootstock cut)
0: Sprouting	09	Emergence: first shoots emerge at the soil surface
1: Leaf development	11	First pair of leaves unfolded
1: Leaf development	12	2nd pair of leaves unfolded (beginning of twining)
1: Leaf development	13	3rd pair of leaves unfolded
1: Leaf development	1 .	Stages continuous till ...
1: Leaf development	19	9 and more pairs of leaves unfolded
2: Formation of side shoots	21	First pair of side shoots visible
2: Formation of side shoots	22	2nd pair of side shoots visible
2: Formation of side shoots	23	3rd pair of side shoots visible
2: Formation of side shoots	2 .	Stages continuous till ...
2: Formation of side shoots	29	Nine and more pairs of side shoots visible (secondary side shoots occur)
3: Elongation of bines	31	Bines have reached 10% of top wire height
3: Elongation of bines	32	Bines have reached 20% of top wire height
3: Elongation of bines	33	Bines have reached 30% of top wire height
3: Elongation of bines	3 .	Stages continuous till ...
3: Elongation of bines	38	Plants have reached the top wire
3: Elongation of bines	39	End of bine growth
5: Inflorescence emergence	51	Inflorescence buds visible
5: Inflorescence emergence	55	Inflorescence buds enlarged
6: Flowering	61	Beginning of flowering: about 10% of flowers open
6: Flowering	62	About 20% of flowers open
6: Flowering	63	About 30% of flowers open
6: Flowering	64	About 40% of flowers open
6: Flowering	65	Full flowering: about 50% of flowers open
6: Flowering	66	About 60% of flowers open
6: Flowering	67	About 70% of flowers open
6: Flowering	68	About 80% of flowers open
6: Flowering	69	End of flowering
7: Development of cones	71	Beginning of cone development: 10% of inflorescences are cones
7: Development of cones	75	Cone development half way: all cones visible, cones soft, stigmas still present
7: Development of cones	79	Cone development complete: nearly all cones have reached full size
8: Maturity of cones	81	Beginning of maturity: 10% of cones are compact
8: Maturity of cones	82	20% of cones are compact
8: Maturity of cones	83	30% of cones are compact
8: Maturity of cones	84	40% of cones are compact
8: Maturity of cones	85	Advanced maturity: 50% of cones are compact
8: Maturity of cones	86	60% of cones are compact
8: Maturity of cones	87	70% of cones are compact
8: Maturity of cones	88	80% of cones are compact
8: Maturity of cones	89	Cones ripe for picking: cones closed; lupulin golden; aroma potential fully developed
9: Senescence, entry into dormancy	92	Overripeness: cones yellow-brown discoloured, aroma deterioration
9: Senescence, entry into dormancy	97	Dormancy: leaves and stems dead
