= BBCH-scale (coffee) =

In biology, the BBCH-scale for coffee describes the phenological development of bean plants using the BBCH-scale.

The phenological growth stages and BBCH-identification keys of coffee plants are:

Growth stage	Code	Description
0: Germination, vegetative propagation	00	Dry seed (11–12% moisture content), beige color if parchment present or bluish-green if parchment and silver skin removed. Cutting (orthotropic, mononodal, 60 mm long, two half trimmed leaves). Stump with bulky nodes and no buds visible
0: Germination, vegetative propagation	01	Beginning of seed imbibition, bean swollen, whitish, no radicle visible. Cutting planted in rooting media, no shoots visible, no callus visible
0: Germination, vegetative propagation	02	Seed imbibition complete, bean whitish, small swelling visible at one end of bean where the embryo is located. Callus formation begins on cuttings. Bud burst start on stumps
0: Germination, vegetative propagation	05	Seed radicle protrusion and hooking. Shoot and root formation on the cuttings. Green, rounded buds visible on the stumps
0: Germination, vegetative propagation	06	Elongation of radicle, formation of root hairs and lateral roots on seeds and cuttings.
0: Germination, vegetative propagation	07	Hypocotyl with cotyledons breaking through the seed coat. Cuttings have formed shoots and branched roots.
0: Germination, vegetative propagation	09	Emergence: Seeds have emerged from soil and show the hypocotile with cotyledons still enclosed in the parchment. The cuttings present roots 6–7 cm. long and shoots with 1–2 nodes. Stumps show sprouts with first leaf initials.
1: Leaf development on main shoot of the young plant, and branches of the coffee tree	10	Cotyledons completely unfolded. First pair of true leaves separating on shoot or first pair of true leaves separating on branch of the coffee tree
1: Leaf development on main shoot of the young plant, and branches of the coffee tree	11	first leaf pair unfolded, not yet at full size. Leaves are light green or bronze
1: Leaf development on main shoot of the young plant, and branches of the coffee tree	12	2 leaf pairs unfolded, not yet at full size. Leaves are light green or bronze
1: Leaf development on main shoot of the young plant, and branches of the coffee tree	13	3 leaf pairs unfolded, not yet full size. The third leaf pair from apex is dark green
1: Leaf development on main shoot of the young plant, and branches of the coffee tree	14	4 leaf pairs unfolded. The fourth leaf pair from apex is dark green and has reached full size
1: Leaf development on main shoot of the young plant, and branches of the coffee tree	1.	Stages continues till...
1: Leaf development on main shoot of the young plant, and branches of the coffee tree	19	9 or more leaf pairs unfolded
2: Formation of branches (only for plants in the field)	20	First pair of primary branches are visible
2: Formation of branches (only for plants in the field)	21	10 pair of primary branches visible
2: Formation of branches (only for plants in the field)	22	20 pair of primary branches visible
2: Formation of branches (only for plants in the field)	23	30 pair of primary branches visible
2: Formation of branches (only for plants in the field)	2.	Stages continues till...
2: Formation of branches (only for plants in the field)	29	90 or more pairs of primary branches visible
3: Branch elongation	31	10 nodes present in the branch(es)
3: Branch elongation	32	20 nodes present in the branch(es)
3: Branch elongation	3.	Stages continues till...
3: Branch elongation	39	90 or more nodes present in the branch(es)
5: Inflorescence emergence	51	Inflorescence buds swelling in leaf axils
5: Inflorescence emergence	53	Inflorescence buds burst and covered by brown mucilage; no flowers visible
5: Inflorescence emergence	57	Flowers visible, still closed and tightly join, borne on multiflowered inflorescence (3–4 flowers per inflorescence)
5: Inflorescence emergence	58	Flowers visible, untight, still closed, petals 4–6 mm long and green (dormant stage)
5: Inflorescence emergence	59	Flowers with petals elongated ( 6–10 mm long), still closed and white color.
6: Flowering	60	First flowers open
6: Flowering	61	10% of flowers open
6: Flowering	63	30% of flowers open
6: Flowering	65	50% of flowers open
6: Flowering	67	70% of flowers open
6: Flowering	69	90% of flowers open
7: Development of fruit	70	Fruits visible as small yellowish berries
7: Development of fruit	71	Fruit set: Beginning of berry growth. Fruits have reached 10% of final size (pinheads).
7: Development of fruit	73	Fruits are light green and contents are liquid and crystalline. Fruits have reached 30% of final size (fast growth).
7: Development of fruit	75	Fruits are light green and its contents are liquid and crystalline. Fruits have reached 50% of final size.
7: Development of fruit	77	Fruits are dark green and its contents are solid and white. Fruits have reached 70% of final size.
7: Development of fruit	79	Fruits are pale green and its contents are solid and white. Physiological maturity is complete. Fruits have reached 90% of final size.
8: Ripening of fruit and seed	81	Beginning of change of fruit coloration from pale green to yellow or red
8: Ripening of fruit and seed	85	Increase in intensity (variety-specific), yellow or red, fruit color; fruit not yet ready for picking.
8: Ripening of fruit and seed	88	Fruit is fully ripe color and ready for picking.
8: Ripening of fruit and seed	89	Overripe; beginning of darkening or drying; fruits stay on the tree or abscission begins.
9: Senescence	90	Shoots have completed their development; the plant appears of an intense dark green color, leaves are of normal size and harvest locates at the bottom part of the plant.
9: Senescence	93	Older leaves change its color from deep green to yellow with red spots, and fall specially at harvesting time.
9: Senescence	94	The foliage changes to a pale green color. Defoliation is observed on the bottom part of the main stem and lower branches.
9: Senescence	97	The production zone has moved towards the upper parts in the main shoot and outer parts of branches, leaves are of smaller size than normal, strong defoliation is observed on the bottom and inner part of the plant, some dead branches are observed at the bottom.
9: Senescence	98	The production zone is limited to a very few branches on the top of the shoot and a very few nodes on the tip of these branches, and the plant is heavily defoliated. A high-degree of senescence has been reached. 90% or more of the harvest completed.
9: Senescence	99	Post harvest or storage treatments
