= BBCH-scale (other brassica vegetables) =

In biology, the BBCH-scale for other brassica vegetables describes the phenological development of vegetables such as brussels sprouts, cauliflower and broccoli using the BBCH-scale.

The phenological growth stages and BBCH-identification keys of other brassica vegetables are:

Growth stage	Code	Description
0: Germination	00	Dry seed
0: Germination	01	Beginning of seed imbibition
0: Germination	03	Seed imbibition complete
0: Germination	05	Radicle emerged from seed
0: Germination	07	Hypocotyl with cotyledons breaking through seed coat
0: Germination	09	Emergence: cotyledons break through soil surface
1: Leaf development (Main shoot)	10	Cotyledons completely unfolded; growing point or true leaf initial visible
1: Leaf development (Main shoot)	11	First true leaf unfolded
1: Leaf development (Main shoot)	12	2nd true leaf unfolded
1: Leaf development (Main shoot)	13	3rd true leaf unfolded
1: Leaf development (Main shoot)	1 .	Stages continuous till ...
1: Leaf development (Main shoot)	19	9 or more true leaves unfolded
2: Formation of side shoots	21	First side shoot visible^{1}
2: Formation of side shoots	22	2nd side shoot visible^{1}
2: Formation of side shoots	23	3rd side shoot visible^{1}
2: Formation of side shoots	2 .	Stages continuous till ...
2: Formation of side shoots	29	9 or more side shoots visible^{1}
3: Stem elongation of rosette growth	31	Main shoot has reached 10% of the expected height typical for the variety^{2}
3: Stem elongation of rosette growth	32	Main shoot has reached 20% of the expected height typical for the variety^{2}
3: Stem elongation of rosette growth	33	Main shoot has reached 30% of the expected height typical for the variety^{2}
3: Stem elongation of rosette growth	34	Main shoot has reached 40% of the expected height typical for the variety^{2}
3: Stem elongation of rosette growth	35	Main shoot has reached 50% of the expected height typical for the variety^{2}
3: Stem elongation of rosette growth	36	Main shoot has reached 60% of the expected height typical for the variety^{2}
3: Stem elongation of rosette growth	37	Main shoot has reached 70% of the expected height typical for the variety^{2}
3: Stem elongation of rosette growth	38	Main shoot has reached 80% of the expected height typical for the variety^{2}
3: Stem elongation of rosette growth	39	Main shoot has reached the height typical for the variety^{2}
4: Development of harvestable vegetative plant parts	41	Lateral buds begin to develop^{2} Cauliflower heads begin to form;width of growing tip > 1 cm3
4: Development of harvestable vegetative plant parts	43	First sprouts tightly closed^{2} 30% of the expected head diameter reached^{3}
4: Development of harvestable vegetative plant parts	45	50% of the sprouts tightly closed^{2} 50% of the expected head diameter reached^{3}
4: Development of harvestable vegetative plant parts	46	60% of the sprouts tightly closed^{2} 60% of the expected head diameter reached^{3}
4: Development of harvestable vegetative plant parts	47	70% of the sprouts tightly closed^{2} 70% of the expected head diameter reached^{3}
4: Development of harvestable vegetative plant parts	48	80% of the sprouts tightly closed^{2} 80% of the expected head diameter reached^{3}
4: Development of harvestable vegetative plant parts	49	Sprouts below terminal bud tightly closed^{2} Typical size and form reached; head tightly closed^{3}
5: Inflorescence emergence	51	Main inflorescence visible between uppermost leaves^{2} Branches of inflorescence begin to elongate^{3}
5: Inflorescence emergence	55	First individual flowers visible (still closed)
5: Inflorescence emergence	59	First flower petals visible; flowers still closed
6: Flowering	60	First flowers open (sporadically)
6: Flowering	61	Beginning of flowering: 10% of flowers open
6: Flowering	62	20% of flowers open
6: Flowering	63	30% of flowers open
6: Flowering	64	40% of flowers open
6: Flowering	65	Full flowering: 50% of flowers open
6: Flowering	67	Flowering finishing: majority of petals fallen or dry
6: Flowering	69	End of flowering
7: Development of fruit	71	First fruits formed
7: Development of fruit	72	20% of fruits have reached typical size
7: Development of fruit	73	30% of fruits have reached typical size
7: Development of fruit	74	40% of fruits have reached typical size
7: Development of fruit	75	50% of fruits have reached typical size
7: Development of fruit	76	60% of fruits have reached typical size
7: Development of fruit	77	70% of fruits have reached typical size
7: Development of fruit	78	80% of fruits have reached typical size
7: Development of fruit	79	Fruits have reached typical size
8: Ripening of fruit and seed	81	Beginning of ripening: 10% of fruits ripe
8: Ripening of fruit and seed	82	20% of fruits ripe
8: Ripening of fruit and seed	83	30% of fruits ripe
8: Ripening of fruit and seed	84	40% of fruits ripe
8: Ripening of fruit and seed	85	50% of fruits ripe
8: Ripening of fruit and seed	86	60% of fruits ripe
8: Ripening of fruit and seed	87	70% of fruits ripe
8: Ripening of fruit and seed	88	80% of fruits ripe
8: Ripening of fruit and seed	89	Fully ripe: seeds on the whole plant of typical color and hard
9: Senescence	92	Leaves and shoots beginning to discolour
9: Senescence	95	50% of leaves yellow or dead
9: Senescence	97	Plants dead
9: Senescence	99	Harvested product (seeds)

1 For broccoli
2 For brussels sprout
3 For cauliflower and broccoli
