= BBCH-scale (faba bean) =

Scale describing the phenological development of faba beans

In biology, the BBCH-scale for faba beans describes the phenological development of faba beans using the BBCH-scale.

The phenological growth stages and BBCH-identification keys of faba beans are:

Growth stage	Code	Description
0: Germination	00	Dry seed
0: Germination	01	Beginning of seed imbibition
0: Germination	03	Seed imbibition complete
0: Germination	05	Radicle emerged from seed
0: Germination	07	Shoot emerged from seed (plumule apparent)
0: Germination	08	Shoot growing towards soil surface
0: Germination	09	Emergence: shoot emerges through soil surface
1: Leaf development^{1}	10	Pair of scale leaves visible (may be eaten or lost)
1: Leaf development^{1}	11	First leaf unfolded
1: Leaf development^{1}	12	2 leaves unfolded
1: Leaf development^{1}	13	3 leaves unfolded
1: Leaf development^{1}	1 .	Stages continuous till ...
1: Leaf development^{1}	19	9 or more leaves unfolded
2: Formation of side shoots	20	No side shoots
2: Formation of side shoots	21	Beginning of side shoot development: first side shoot detectable
2: Formation of side shoots	22	2 side shoots detectable
2: Formation of side shoots	23	3 side shoots detectable
2: Formation of side shoots	2 .	Stages continuous till ...
2: Formation of side shoots	29	End of side shoot development: 9 or more side shoots detectable
3: Stem elongation	30	Beginning of stem elongation
3: Stem elongation	31	One visibly extended internode^{2}
3: Stem elongation	32	2 visibly extended internodes
3: Stem elongation	33	3 visibly extended internodes
3: Stem elongation	3 .	Stages continuous till ...
3: Stem elongation	39	9 or more visibly extended internodes
5: Inflorescence emergence	50	Flower buds present, still enclosed by leaves
5: Inflorescence emergence	51	First flower buds visible outside leaves
5: Inflorescence emergence	55	First individual flower buds visible outside leaves but still closed
5: Inflorescence emergence	59	First petals visible, many individual flower buds, still closed
6: Flowering	60	First flowers open
6: Flowering	61	Flowers open on first raceme
6: Flowering	63	Flowers open 3 racemes per plant
6: Flowering	65	Full flowering: flowers open on 5 racemes per plant
6: Flowering	67	Flowering declining
6: Flowering	69	End of flowering
7: Development of fruit	70	First pods have reached final length (“flat pod”)
7: Development of fruit	71	10% of pods have reached final length
7: Development of fruit	72	20% of pods have reached final length
7: Development of fruit	73	30% of pods have reached final length
7: Development of fruit	74	40% of pods have reached final length
7: Development of fruit	75	50% of pods have reached final length
7: Development of fruit	76	60% of pods have reached final length
7: Development of fruit	77	70% of pods have reached final length
7: Development of fruit	78	80% of pods have reached final length
7: Development of fruit	79	Nearly all pods have reached final length
8: Ripening	80	Beginning of ripening: seed green, filling pod cavity
8: Ripening	81	10% of pods ripe, seeds dry and hard
8: Ripening	82	20% of pods ripe, seeds dry and hard
8: Ripening	83	30% of pods ripe and dark, seeds dry and hard
8: Ripening	84	40% of pods ripe and dark, seeds dry and hard
8: Ripening	85	50% of pods ripe and dark, seeds dry and hard
8: Ripening	86	60% of pods ripe and dark, seeds dry and hard
8: Ripening	87	70% of pods ripe and dark, seeds dry and hard
8: Ripening	88	80% of pods ripe and dark, seeds dry and hard
8: Ripening	89	Fully ripe: nearly all pods dark, seeds dry and hard
9: Senescence	93	Stems begin to darken
9: Senescence	95	50% of stems brown or black
9: Senescence	97	Plant dead and dry
9: Senescence	99	Harvested product

1 Stem elongation may occur earlier than stage 19; in this case continue with the principal stage 3
2 First internode extends from the scale leaf node to the first true leaf node
