= BBCH-scale (solanaceous fruit) =

Scale identifying the phenological development stages of solanaceous fruit

The BBCH-scale (solanaceous fruit) identifies the phenological development stages of solanaceous fruit (tomato = Lycopersicon esculentum, aubergine = Solanum melongena, paprika = Capsicum annuum). It is a plant species specific version of the BBCH-scale.

Phenological growth stages and BBCH-identification keys of solanaceous fruits
| Code (2-digit) | Code (3-digit) | Description |
Principal growth stage 0: Germination
| 00 | 000 | Dry seeds |
| 01 | 001 | Beginning of seed imbibition |
| 03 | 003 | Seed imbibition complete |
| 05 | 005 | Radicle emerged from seed |
| 07 | 007 | Hypocotyl with cotyledons breaking through seed coat |
| 09 | 009 | Emergence: coryledons break through soil surface |
Principal growth stage 1: Leaf development
| 10 | 100 | Cotyledons completely unfolded |
| 11 | 101 | First true leaf on main shoot fully unfolded |
| 12 | 102 | 2nd leaf on main shoot unfolded |
| 13 | 103 | 3rd leaf on main shoot unfolded |
| 1 . | 10 . | Stages continuous till ... |
| 19 | 109 | 9 or more leaves on main shoot unfolded |
Principal growth stage 2: Formation of side shoots^{1}
| 21 | 201 | First primary apical side shoot visible |
| 22 | 202 | 2nd primary apical side shoot visible |
| 2 . | 20 . | Stages continuous till ... |
| 29 | 209 | 9 or more apical primary side shoots visible |
| – | 221 | First secondary apical side shoot visible |
| – | 22 . | Stages continuous till ... |
| – | 229 | 9th secondary apical side shoot visible |
| – | 231 | First tertiary apical side shoot visible |
| – | 23 . | Stages continuous till ... |
| – | 2NX | Xth apical side shoot of the Nth order visible |
Principal growth stage 5: Inflorescence emergence
| 51 | 501 | First inflorescence visible (first bud erect)^{2} First flower bud visible3 |
| 52 | 502 | 2nd inflorescence visible (first bud erect)^{2} 2nd flower bud visible3 |
| 53 | 503 | 3rd inflorescence visible (first bud erect)^{2} 3rd flower bud visible3 |
| 5 . | 50 . | Stages continuous till ... |
| 59 | 509 | 9 or more inflorescences visible (2digit), 9th inflorescence visible(first bud erect) (3digit)^{2} 9 or more flower buds already visible (2digit), 9th flower bud visible (3digit)^{3} |
| – | 510 | 10th inflorescence visible (first bud erect)^{2} 10th flower bud visible3 |
| – | 51 . | Stages continuous till ... |
| – | 519 | 19th inflorescence visible (first bud erect)^{2} 19th flower bud visible^{3} |
Principal growth stage 6: Flowering
| 61 | 601 | First inflorescence: first flower open^{2} First flower open^{3} |
| 62 | 602 | 2nd inflorescence: first flower open^{2} 2nd flower open^{3} |
| 63 | 603 | 3rd inflorescence: first flower open^{2} 3rd flower open^{3} |
| 6 . | 60 . | Stages continuous till ... |
| 69 | 609 | 9 or more inflorescences with open flowers (2digit) 9th inflorescence: first flower open (3digit)^{2} 9 or more flowers already open (2digit); 9th flower open (3digit)^{3} |
| – | 610 | 10th inflorescence: first flower open^{2} 10th flower open^{3} |
| – | 61 . | Stages continuous till ... |
| – | 619 | 19th inflorescence: first flower open^{2} 19th flower open^{3} |
Principal growth stage 7: Development of fruit
| 71 | 701 | First fruit cluster: first fruit has reached typical size^{2} First fruit has reached typical size and form^{3} |
| 72 | 702 | 2nd fruit cluster: first fruit has reached typical size^{2} 2nd fruit has reached typical size and form^{3} |
| 73 | 703 | 3rd fruit cluster: first fruit has reached typical size^{2} 3rd fruit has reached typical size and form^{3} |
| 7 . | 70 . | Stages continuous till ... |
| 79 | 709 | 9 or more fruit clusters with fruits of typical size (2digit) 9th fruit cluster:first fruit has reached typical size (3digit)^{2} 9 or more fruits have reached typical size and form (2digit); 9th fruit has reached typical size and form(3digit)^{3} |
| – | 710 | 10th fruit cluster: first fruit has reached typical form and size^{2} 10th fruit has reached typical form and size^{3} |
| – | 71 . | Stages continuous till ... 19th fruit has reached typical form and size^{3} |
| – | 719 | 19th fruit cluster: first fruit has reached typical form and size^{2} |
Principal growth stage 8: Ripening of fruit and seed
| 81 | 801 | 10% of fruits show typical fully ripe colour |
| 82 | 802 | 20% of fruits show typical fully ripe colour |
| 83 | 803 | 30% of fruits show typical fully ripe colour |
| 84 | 804 | 40% of fruits show typical fully ripe colour |
| 85 | 805 | 50% of fruits show typical fully ripe colour |
| 86 | 806 | 60% of fruits show typical fully ripe colour |
| 87 | 807 | 70% of fruits show typical fully ripe colour |
| 88 | 808 | 80% of fruits show typical fully ripe colour |
| 89 | 809 | Fully ripe: fruits have typical fully ripe colour^{3} |
Principal growth stage 9: Senescence
| 97 | 907 | Plants dead |
| 99 | 909 | Harvested product |

1 For tomatoes with determinate stem growth, paprika and aubergines. In tomatoes with indeterminate stem growth and only one sympodial branch at the corresponding axis, the apical side shoot formation occurs concurrently with the emergence of the inflorescence (Principal growth stage 5), so that the coding within principal growth stage 2 is not necessary
2 For tomato
3 For paprika and aubergine
