= BBCH-scale (pome fruit) =

Phenological development of fruits

In biology, the BBCH-scale for pome fruit describes the phenological development of fruits such as apples and pears using the BBCH-scale.

The phenological growth stages and BBCH-identification keys of pome fruit are:

| Growth stage | Code | Description |
|---|---|---|
| 0: Sprouting/Bud development | 00 | Dormancy: leaf buds and the thicker inflorescence buds closed and covered by dark brown scales |
| 0: Sprouting/Bud development | 01 | Beginning of leaf bud swelling: buds visibly swollen, bud scales elongated, with light coloured patches |
| 0: Sprouting/Bud development | 03 | End of leaf bud swelling: bud scales light coloured with some parts densely covered by hairs |
| 0: Sprouting/Bud development | 07 | Beginning of bud break: first green leaf tips just visible |
| 0: Sprouting/Bud development | 09 | Green leaf tips about 5 mm above bud scales |
| 1: Leaf development | 10 | Mouse-ear stage: Green leaf tips 10 mm above the bud scales; first leaves separating |
| 1: Leaf development | 11 | First leaves unfolded (others still unfolding) |
| 1: Leaf development | 15 | More leaves unfolded, not yet at full size |
| 1: Leaf development | 19 | First leaves fully expanded |
| 3: Shoot development^{1} | 31 | Beginning of shoot growth: axes of developing shoots visible |
| 3: Shoot development^{1} | 32 | Shoots about 20% of final length |
| 3: Shoot development^{1} | 33 | Shoots about 30% of final length |
| 3: Shoot development^{1} | 3 . | Stages continuous till ... |
| 3: Shoot development^{1} | 39 | Shoots about 90% of final length |
| 5: Inflorescence emergence | 51 | Inflorescence buds swelling: bud scales elongated, with light coloured patches |
| 5: Inflorescence emergence | 52 | End of bud swelling: light coloured bud scales visible with parts densely covered by hairs |
| 5: Inflorescence emergence | 53 | Bud burst: green leaf tips enclosing flowers visible |
| 5: Inflorescence emergence | 54 | Mouse-ear stage: green leaf tips 10 mm above bud scales; first leaves separating |
| 5: Inflorescence emergence | 55 | Flower buds visible (still closed) |
| 5: Inflorescence emergence | 56 | Green bud stage: single flowers separating (still closed) |
| 5: Inflorescence emergence | 57 | Pink bud stage: flower petals elongating; sepals slightly open; petals just visible |
| 5: Inflorescence emergence | 59 | Most flowers with petals forming a hollow ball |
| 6: Flowering | 60 | First flowers open |
| 6: Flowering | 61 | Beginning of flowering: about 10% of flowers open |
| 6: Flowering | 62 | About 20% of flowers open |
| 6: Flowering | 63 | About 30% of flowers open |
| 6: Flowering | 64 | About 40% of flowers open |
| 6: Flowering | 65 | Full flowering: at least 50% of flowers open, first petals falling |
| 6: Flowering | 67 | Flowers fading: majority of petals fallen |
| 6: Flowering | 69 | End of flowering: all petals fallen |
| 7: Development of fruit | 71 | Fruit size up to 10 mm; fruit fall after flowering |
| 7: Development of fruit | 72 | Fruit size up to 20 mm |
| 7: Development of fruit | 73 | Second fruit fall |
| 7: Development of fruit | 74 | Fruit diameter up to 40 mm; fruit erect (T-stage: underside of fruit and stalk forming a T) |
| 7: Development of fruit | 75 | Fruit about half final size |
| 7: Development of fruit | 76 | Fruit about 60% final size |
| 7: Development of fruit | 77 | Fruit about 70% final size |
| 7: Development of fruit | 78 | Fruit about 80% final size |
| 7: Development of fruit | 79 | Fruit about 90% final size |
| 8: Maturity of fruit and seed | 81 | Beginning of ripening: first appearance of cultivar-specific colour |
| 8: Maturity of fruit and seed | 85 | Advanced ripening: increase in intensity of cultivar-specific colour |
| 8: Maturity of fruit and seed | 87 | Fruit ripe for picking |
| 8: Maturity of fruit and seed | 89 | Fruit ripe for consumption: fruit have typical taste and firmness |
| 9: Senescence, beginning of dormancy | 91 | Shoot growth completed; terminal bud developed; foliage still fully green |
| 9: Senescence, beginning of dormancy | 92 | Leaves begin to discolour |
| 9: Senescence, beginning of dormancy | 93 | Beginning of leaf fall |
| 9: Senescence, beginning of dormancy | 95 | 50% of leaves discoloured |
| 9: Senescence, beginning of dormancy | 97 | All leaves fallen |
| 9: Senescence, beginning of dormancy | 99 | Harvested product |

1 From terminal bud
