= BBCH-scale (root and stem vegetable) =

The BBCH-scale for root and stem vegetables identifies the phenological development stages of the root and stem vegetables such as carrot, celeriac, kohlrabi, chicory, radish and swede, using the BBCH-scale.

Growth stage	Code	Description
0: Germination	00	Dry seed
0: Germination	01	Beginning of seed imbibition
0: Germination	03	Seed imbibition complete
0: Germination	05	Radicle emerged from seed
0: Germination	07	Hypocotyl with cotyledons breaking through seed coat
0: Germination	09	Emergence: cotyledons break through soil surface
1: Leaf development (Main shoot)	10	Cotyledons completely unfolded; growing point or true leaf initial visible
1: Leaf development (Main shoot)	11	First true leaf unfolded
1: Leaf development (Main shoot)	12	2nd true leaf unfolded
1: Leaf development (Main shoot)	13	3rd true leaf unfolded
1: Leaf development (Main shoot)	1 .	Stages continuous till ...
1: Leaf development (Main shoot)	19	9 or more true leaves unfolded
4: Development of harvestable vegetative plant parts	41	Roots beginning to expand (diameter > 0,5 cm)
4: Development of harvestable vegetative plant parts	42	20% of the expected root diameter reached
4: Development of harvestable vegetative plant parts	43	30% of the expected root diameter reached
4: Development of harvestable vegetative plant parts	44	40% of the expected root diameter reached
4: Development of harvestable vegetative plant parts	45	50% of the expected root diameter reached
4: Development of harvestable vegetative plant parts	46	60% of the expected root diameter reached
4: Development of harvestable vegetative plant parts	47	70% of the expected root diameter reached
4: Development of harvestable vegetative plant parts	48	80% of the expected root diameter reached
4: Development of harvestable vegetative plant parts	49	Expansion complete; typical form and size of roots reached
5: Inflorescence emergence	51	Main shoot begins to elongate
5: Inflorescence emergence	53	30% of the expected height of the main shoot reached
5: Inflorescence emergence	55	First individual flowers of main inflorescence visible (still closed)
5: Inflorescence emergence	57	First individual flowers of secondary inflorescences visible (still closed)
5: Inflorescence emergence	59	First flower petals visible; flowers still closed
6: Flowering	60	First flowers open (sporadically)
6: Flowering	61	Beginning of flowering: 10% of flowers open
6: Flowering	62	20% of flowers open
6: Flowering	63	30% of flowers open
6: Flowering	64	40% of flowers open
6: Flowering	65	Full flowering: 50% of flowers open
6: Flowering	67	Flowering finishing: majority of petals fallen or dry
6: Flowering	69	End of flowering
7: Development of fruit	71	First fruits formed
7: Development of fruit	72	20% of fruits have reached typical size
7: Development of fruit	73	30% of fruits have reached typical size
7: Development of fruit	74	40% of fruits have reached typical size
7: Development of fruit	75	50% of fruits have reached typical size
7: Development of fruit	76	60% of fruits have reached typical size
7: Development of fruit	77	70% of fruits have reached typical size
7: Development of fruit	78	80% of fruits have reached typical size
7: Development of fruit	79	Fruits have reached typical size
8: Rispening of fruit and seed	81	Beginning of ripening: 10% of fruits ripe, or 10% of seeds of typical colour, dry and hard
8: Rispening of fruit and seed	85	50% of the fruits ripe, or 50% of seeds of typical colour, dry and hard
8: Rispening of fruit and seed	89	Fully ripe: seeds on the whole plant of typical colour and hard
9: Senescence	92	Leaves and shoots beginning to discolour
9: Senescence	95	50% of leaves yellow or dead
9: Senescence	97	Plants or above ground parts dead
9: Senescence	99	Harvested product (seeds)
