= BBCH-scale (bulb vegetable) =

In biology, the BBCH-scale for bulb vegetables describes the phenological development of bulb vegetable plants, such as onion, leek, garlic and shallot, using the BBCH-scale.

The phenological growth stages and BBCH-identification keys of bulb vegetables are:

Growth stage	Code (2-digit)	Code (3-digit)	Description
0: Germination	00	000	Dry seed,^{1} dormant bulb^{2}
0: Germination	01	000	Beginning of seed imbibition^{1}
0: Germination	03	003	Seed imbibition complete^{1}
0: Germination	05	005	Radicle emerged from seed.^{1} Roots appearing^{2}
0: Germination	07	007	Cotyledon breaking through seed coat^{1}
0: Germination	09	009	Emergence: cotyledon breaks through soil surface.^{1} Green shoot visible^{2}
0: Germination		010	Cotyledon visible as hook^{1}
0: Germination		011	Hook stage: hooked cotyledon green^{1}
0: Germination		012	Whip stage: cotyledon has whip-like form^{1}
1: Leaf development (Main shoot)	10	100	Advanced whip stage: whip begins to die off^{1}
1: Leaf development (Main shoot)	11	101	First leaf (> 3 cm) clearly visible
1: Leaf development (Main shoot)	12	102	2nd leaf (> 3 cm) clearly visible
1: Leaf development (Main shoot)	13	103	3rd leaf (> 3 cm)
1: Leaf development (Main shoot)	1 .	10 .	Stages continuous till . . .
1: Leaf development (Main shoot)	19	109	9 or more leaves clearly visible
4: Development of harvestable vegetative plant parts	41	401	Leaf bases begin to thicken or extend
4: Development of harvestable vegetative plant parts	43	403	30% of the expected bulb or shaft diameter reached
4: Development of harvestable vegetative plant parts	45	405	50% of the expected bulb or shaft diameter reached
4: Development of harvestable vegetative plant parts	47	407	Bolting begins; in 10% of the plants leaves bent over^{3} 70% of the expected shaft length and diameter reached^{4}
4: Development of harvestable vegetative plant parts	48	408	Leaves bent over in 50% of plants^{3}
4: Development of harvestable vegetative plant parts	49	409	Leaves dead, bulb top dry; dormancy^{3} Growth complete; length and stem diameter typical for variety reached^{4}
5: Inflorescence emergence	51	501	Onion bulb begins to elongate
5: Inflorescence emergence	53	503	30% of the expected length of flower stem reached
5: Inflorescence emergence	55	505	Flower stem at full length; sheath closed
5: Inflorescence emergence	57	507	Sheath burst open
5: Inflorescence emergence	59	509	First flower petals visible; flowers still closed
6: Flowering	60	600	First flowers open (sporadically)
6: Flowering	61	601	Beginning of flowering: 10% of flowers open
6: Flowering	62	602	20% of flowers open
6: Flowering	63	603	30% of flowers open
6: Flowering	64	604	40% of flowers open
6: Flowering	65	605	Full flowering: 50% of flowers open
6: Flowering	67	607	Flowering finishing: 70% of petals fallen or dry
6: Flowering	69	609	End of flowering
7: Development of fruit	71	701	First capsules formed
7: Development of fruit	72	702	20% of capsules formed
7: Development of fruit	73	703	30% of capsules formed
7: Development of fruit	74	704	40% of capsules formed
7: Development of fruit	75	705	50% of capsules formed
7: Development of fruit	76	706	60% of capsules formed
7: Development of fruit	77	707	70% of capsules formed
7: Development of fruit	78	708	80% of capsules formed
7: Development of fruit	79	709	Capsule development complete; seeds pale
8: Ripening of fruit and seed	81	801	Beginning of ripening: 10% of capsules ripe
8: Ripening of fruit and seed	85	805	First capsules bursting
8: Ripening of fruit and seed	89	809	Fully ripe: seeds black and hard
9: Senescence	92	902	Leaves and shoots beginning to discolour
9: Senescence	95	905	50% of leaves yellow or dead
9: Senescence	97	907	Plants or above ground parts dead
9: Senescence	99	909	Harvested product (seeds)

1 Seed sown
2 Onion sets, shallot and garlic
3 For onions, garlic
4 For leek
