= BBCH-scale (strawberry) =

The BBCH-scale (strawberry) identifies the phenological development stages of strawberry (Fragaria ananassa). It is a plant species specific version of the BBCH-scale.

Phenological growth stages and BBCH-identification keys of strawberry
Code	Description
Principal growth stage 0: Sprouting/Bud development
00	Dormancy: Leaves prostrate and partly dead
03	Main bud swelling
Principal growth stage 1: Leaf development
10	First leaf emerging
11	First leaf unfolded
12	2nd leaf unfolded
13	3rd leaf unfolded^{1}
1 .	Stages continuous till ...
19	9 or more leaves unfolded
Principal growth stage 4: Development of stolons and young plants
41	Beginning of stolon (runner) formation: stolons visible (about 2 cm long)
42	First daughter plant visible
43	Beginning of root development in first daughter plant
45	First daughter plant with roots (ready for planting)
49	Several daughter plants with roots (ready for planting)
Principal growth stage 5: Inflorescence emergence
55	First set flowers at the bottom of the rosette
56	Inflorescence elongating
57	First flower buds emerged (still closed)
58	Early balloon stage: first flowers with petals forming a hollow ball
59	Most flowers with petals forming a hollow ball
Principal growth stage 6: Flowering
60	First flowers open (primary or A-flower)
61	Beginning of flowering: about 10% of flowers open
65	Full flowering: secondary (B) and tertiary (C) flowers open, first petals falling
67	Flowers fading: majority of petals fallen
Principal growth stage 7: Development of fruit
71	Receptacle protruding from sepal whorl
73	Seeds clearly visible on receptacle tissue
Principal growth stage 8: Maturity of fruit
81	Beginning of ripening: most fruits white in colour
85	First fruits have cultivar-specific colour
87	Main harvest: more fruits coloured
89	Second harvest: more fruits coloured
Principal growth stage 9: Senescence, beginning of dormancy
91	Beginning of axillary bud formation
92	New leaves with smaller lamina and shortened stalk visible
93	Old leaves dying, young leaves curling; old leaves of cultivarspecific colour
97	Old leaves dead

1 Normally after the three leaf stage the bud development occurs in principal growth stage 5.
