= BBCH-scale (grape) =

Scale for phenological development of grapes

In biology, the BBCH-scale for grapes describes the phenological development of grapes using the BBCH-scale.

The phenological growth stages and BBCH-identification keys of grapes are:

Growth stage	Code	Description
0: Sprouting/Bud development
0: Sprouting/Bud development	00	Dormancy: winter buds pointed to rounded, light or dark brown according to cultivar; bud scales more or less closed according to cultivar
0: Sprouting/Bud development	01	Beginning of bud swelling: buds begin to expand inside the bud scales
0: Sprouting/Bud development	03	End of bud swelling: buds swollen, but not green
0: Sprouting/Bud development	05	“Wool stage”: brown wool clearly visible
0: Sprouting/Bud development	07	Beginning of bud burst: green shoot tips just visible
0: Sprouting/Bud development	09	Bud burst: green shoot tips clearly visible
1: Leaf development	11	First leaf unfolded and spread away from shoot
1: Leaf development	12	2nd leaves unfolded
1: Leaf development	13	3rd leaves unfolded
1: Leaf development	1 .	Stages continuous till ...
1: Leaf development	19	9 or more leaves unfolded
5: Inflorescence emerge	53	Inflorescences clearly visible
5: Inflorescence emerge	55	Inflorescences swelling, flowers closely pressed together
5: Inflorescence emerge	57	Inflorescences fully developed; flowers separating
6: Flowering	60	First flowerhoods detached from the receptacle
6: Flowering	61	Beginning of flowering: 10% of flowerhoods fallen
6: Flowering	62	20% of flowerhoods fallen
6: Flowering	63	Early flowering: 30% of flowerhoods fallen
6: Flowering	64	40% of flowerhoods fallen
6: Flowering	65	Full flowering: 50% of flowerhoods fallen
6: Flowering	66	60% of flowerhoods fallen
6: Flowering	67	70% of flowerhoods fallen
6: Flowering	68	80% of flowerhoods fallen
6: Flowering	69	End of flowering
7: Development of fruits	71	Fruit set: young fruits begin to swell, remains of flowers lost
7: Development of fruits	73	Berries groat-sized, bunches begin to hang
7: Development of fruits	75	Berries pea-sized, bunches hang
7: Development of fruits	77	Berries beginning to touch
7: Development of fruits	79	Majority of berries touching
8: Ripening of berries	81	Beginning of ripening: berries begin to develop variety-specific colour
8: Ripening of berries	83	Berries developing colour
8: Ripening of berries	85	Softening of berries
8: Ripening of berries	89	Berries ripe for harvest
9: Senescence	91	After harvest; end of wood maturation
9: Senescence	92	Beginning of leaf discolouration
9: Senescence	93	Beginning of leaf-fall
9: Senescence	95	50% of leaves fallen
9: Senescence	97	End of leaf-fall
9: Senescence	99	Harvested product

== See also ==
- Annual growth cycle of grapevines
