= Cereal growth staging scales =

Scales used to measure the growth of cereal crops

Cereal growth staging scales attempt to objectively measure the growth of cereals.

== BBCH-scale (cereals) ==
In agronomy, the BBCH-scale for cereals describes the phenological development of cereals using the BBCH-scale.

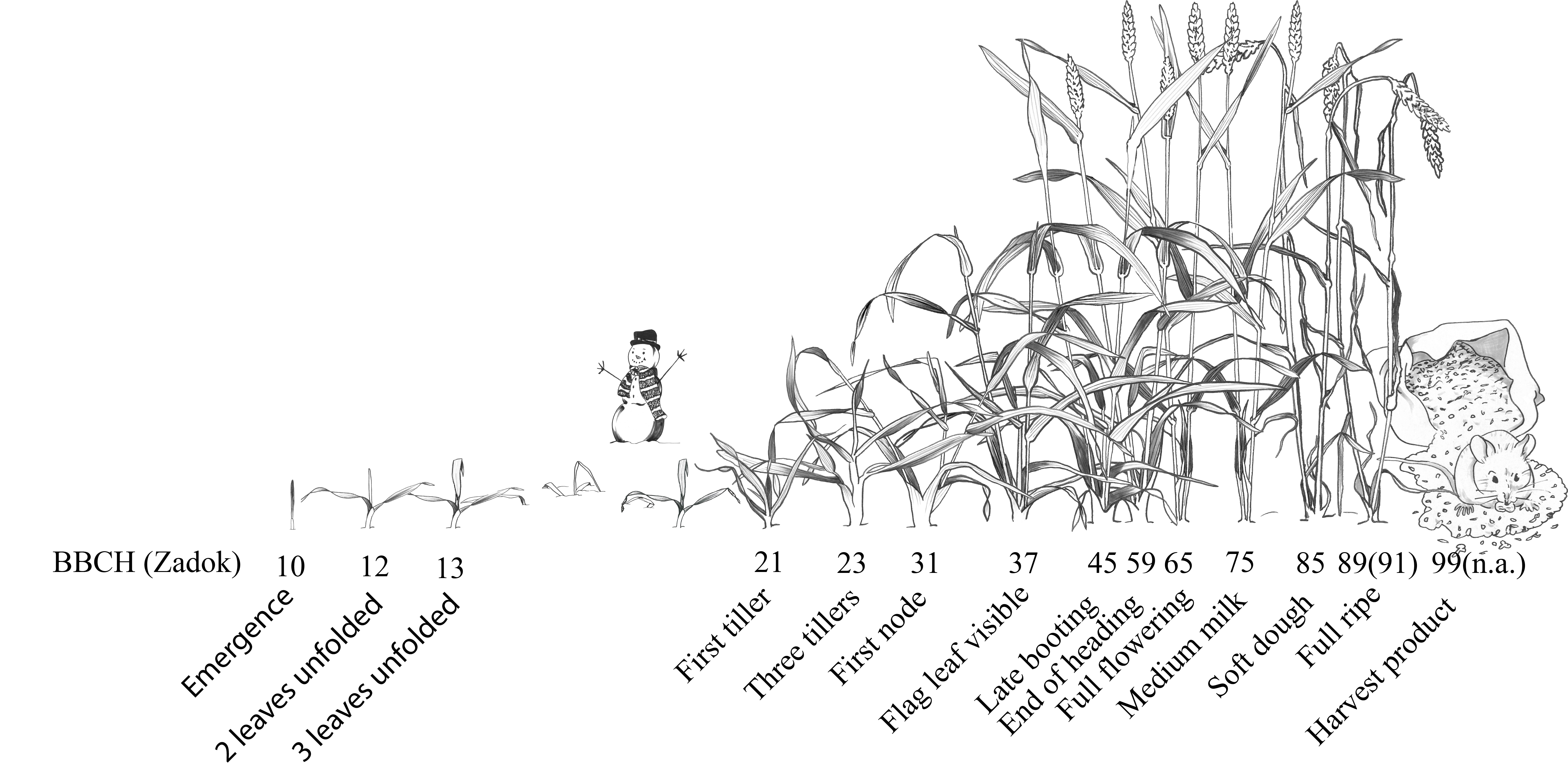
Critical stages according to BBCH (Lancashire et al., 1991) and their deviations from the Zadok's scale (in brackets). The spacing between the stages follows calendar time for the temperate climate of Switzerland (sowing in November, harvest mid-July)

The phenological growth stages and BBCH-identification keys of cereals are:

Growth stage	Code	Description
0: Germination	00	Dry seed (caryopsis)
0: Germination	01	Beginning of seed imbibition
0: Germination	03	Seed imbibition complete
0: Germination	05	Radicle emerged from caryopsis
0: Germination	06	Radicle elongated, root hairs and/or side roots visible
0: Germination	07	Coleoptile emerged from caryopsis
0: Germination	09	Emergence: coleoptile penetrates soil surface (cracking stage)
1: Leaf development^{1}, ^{2}	10	First leaf through coleoptile
1: Leaf development^{1}, ^{2}	11	First leaf unfolded
1: Leaf development^{1}, ^{2}	12	2 leaves unfolded
1: Leaf development^{1}, ^{2}	13	3 leaves unfolded
1: Leaf development^{1}, ^{2}	1 .	Stages continuous till ...
1: Leaf development^{1}, ^{2}	19	9 or more leaves unfolded
2: Tillering^{3}	20	No tillers
2: Tillering^{3}	21	Beginning of tillering: first tiller detectable
2: Tillering^{3}	22	2 tillers detectable
2: Tillering^{3}	23	3 tillers detectable
2: Tillering^{3}	2 .	Stages continuous till ...
2: Tillering^{3}	29	End of tillering. Maximum no. of tillers detectable
3: Stem elongation	30	Beginning of stem elongation: pseudostem and tillers erect, first internode begins to elongate, top of inflorescence at least 1 cm above tillering node
3: Stem elongation	31	First node at least 1 cm above tillering node
3: Stem elongation	32	Node 2 at least 2 cm above node 1
3: Stem elongation	33	Node 3 at least 2 cm above node 2
3: Stem elongation	3 .	Stages continuous till ...
3: Stem elongation	37	Flag leaf just visible, still rolled
3: Stem elongation	39	Flag leaf stage: flag leaf fully unrolled, ligule just visible
4: Booting	41	Early boot stage: flag leaf sheath extending
4: Booting	43	Mid boot stage: flag leaf sheath just visibly swollen
4: Booting	45	Late boot stage: flag leaf sheath swollen
4: Booting	47	Flag leaf sheath opening
4: Booting	49	First awns visible (in awned forms only)
5: Inflorescence emergence, heading	51	Beginning of heading: tip of inflorescence emerged from sheath, first spikelet just visible
5: Inflorescence emergence, heading	52	20% of inflorescence emerged
5: Inflorescence emergence, heading	53	30% of inflorescence emerged
5: Inflorescence emergence, heading	54	40% of inflorescence emerged
5: Inflorescence emergence, heading	55	Middle of heading: half of inflorescence emerged
5: Inflorescence emergence, heading	56	60% of inflorescence emerged
5: Inflorescence emergence, heading	57	70% of inflorescence emerged
5: Inflorescence emergence, heading	58	80% of inflorescence emerged
5: Inflorescence emergence, heading	59	End of heading: inflorescence fully emerged
6: Flowering, anthesis	61	Beginning of flowering: first anthers visible
6: Flowering, anthesis	65	Full flowering: 50% of anthers mature
6: Flowering, anthesis	69	End of flowering: all spikelets have completed flowering but some dehydrated anthers may remain
7: Development of fruit	71	Watery ripe: first grains have reached half their final size
7: Development of fruit	73	Early milk
7: Development of fruit	75	Medium milk: grain content milky, grains reached final size, still green
7: Development of fruit	77	Late milk
8: Ripening	83	Early dough
8: Ripening	85	Soft dough: grain content soft but dry. Fingernail impression not held
8: Ripening	87	Hard dough: grain content solid. Fingernail impression held
8: Ripening	89	Fully ripe: grain hard, difficult to divide with thumbnail
9: Senescence	92	Over-ripe: grain very hard, cannot be dented by thumbnail
9: Senescence	93	Grains loosening in day-time
9: Senescence	97	Plant dead and collapsing
9: Senescence	99	Harvested product

- ^{1} A leaf is unfolded when its ligule is visible or the tip of the next leaf is visible
- ^{2} Tillering or stem elongation may occur earlier than stage 13; in this case continue

with stages 21

- ^{3} If stem elongation begins before the end of tillering continue with stage 30

== Feekes scale ==
The Feekes scale is a system to identify the growth and development of cereal crops introduced by the Dutch agronomists Willem Feekes (1907-1979) in 1941. This scale is more widely used in the United States than other similar and more descriptive scales such as the Zadoks scale or the BBCH scale. Like other scales of crop development, the Feekes scale is useful in planning management strategies that incorporate plant growth information for the use of pesticides and fertilizers to avoid damaging the crop and/or maximize crop yield.

Cereal growth stages using the Feekes scale
Stage	Description
Tillering
1	One shoot (number of leaves can be added), first leaf through coleoptile.
2	Beginning of tillering; main shoot and one tiller.
3	Tillers formed; leaves often twisted spirally. Main shoot and six tillers. In some varieties of winter wheat, plant may be "creeping," or prostrate.
4	Beginning of the erection of the pseudo-stem; leaf sheaths beginning to lengthen.
5	Pseudo-stem (formed by sheaths of leaves) strongly erected.
Stem Extension
6	First node of stem visible at base of shoot.
7	Second node of stem formed; next-to-last leaf just visible.
8	Flag leaf (last leaf) visible but still rolled up; ear beginning to swell.
9	Ligule of flag leaf just visible.
10	Sheath of flag leaf completely grown out; ear swollen but not yet visible.
Heading
10.1	First spikelet of head just visible.
10.2	One-quarter of heading process completed.
10.3	Half of heading process completed.
10.4	Three-quarters of heading process completed.
10.5	All heads out of sheath.
Flowering
10.51	Beginning of flowering.
10.52	Flowering complete to top of head.
10.53	Flowering completed at base of head.
10.54	Flowering completed; kernel watery ripe.
Ripening
11.1	Milky ripe.
11.2	Mealy ripe; contents of kernel soft but dry. Soft dough.
11.3	Kernel hard (difficult to divide with thumbnail).
11.4	Ripe for cutting. Straw dead.

== Zadoks scale ==
The Zadoks scale is a cereal development scale proposed by the Dutch phytopathologist Jan Zadoks that is widely used in cereal research and agriculture. Knowing the stages of development of a crop is critical in many management decisions that growers make. They are represented on a scale from 10 to 92. For example, in some countries, nitrogen and herbicide applications must be completed during the tillering stage. In France, the recommendation for the first nitrogen application on wheat is 6 weeks before Z30, with the second application on Z30. Wheat growth regulators are typically applied at Z30. Disease control is most critical in the stem extension and heading stage (Z31, Z32, Z35), in particular as soon as the flag leaf is out (Z37). The crop is also more sensitive to heat or frost at some stages than others (for example, during the meiosis stage the crop is very sensitive to low temperature). Knowing the growth stage of the crop when checking for problems is essential for deciding which control measures should be followed.

Examples of typical stages

- during tillering
  - Z10: one leaf
  - Z21: tillering begins
- during stem extension
  - Z30: ear is one centimeter long in wheat
  - Z31: first node visible
  - Z32: second node visible
  - Z37: flag leaf
- during heading
  - Z55: the head is 1/2 emerged.
- during ripening
  - Z92: grains are ripe

Comparison of growth stage scales
Zadok; Scale	Feekes; Scale	Haun; Scale	Description
Germination
00			Dry seed
01			Start of imbibition
03			Imbibition complete
05			Radicle emerged from seed
07			Coleoptile emerged from seed
09		0.0	Leaf just at coleoptile tip
Seedling growth
10	1		First leaf through coleoptile
11		1.+	First leaf unfolded
12		1.+	2 leaves unfolded
13		2.+	3 leaves unfolded
14		3.+	4 leaves unfolded
15		4.+	5 leaves unfolded
16		5.+	6 leaves unfolded
17		6.+	7 leaves unfolded
18		7.+	8 leaves unfolded
19			9 or more leaves unfolded
Tillering
20			Main shoot only
21	2		Main shoot and 1 tiller
22			Main shoot and 2 tillers
23			Main shoot and 3 tillers
24			Main shoot and 4 tillers
25			Main shoot and 5 tillers
26	3		Main shoot and 6 tillers
27			Main shoot and 7 tillers
28			Main shoot and 8 tillers
29			Main shoot and 9 or more tillers
Stem Elongation
30	4-5		Pseudo stem erection
31	6		1st node detectable
32	7		2nd node detectable
33			3rd node detectable
34			4th node detectable
35			5th node detectable
36			6th node detectable
37	8		Flag leaf just visible
39	9		Flag leaf ligule/collar just visible
Booting
40			-
41		8-9	Flag leaf sheath extending
45	10	9.2	Boots just swollen
47			Flag leaf sheath opening
49		10.1	First awns visible
Inflorescence emergence
50	10.1	10.2	First spikelet of inflorescence visible
53	10.2		1/4 of inflorescence emerged
55	10.3	10.5	1/2 of inflorescence emerged
57	10.4	10.7	3/4 of inflorescence emerged
59	10.5	11.0	Emergence of inflorescence completed
Anthesis
60	10.51	11.4	Beginning on anthesis
65		11.5	Anthesis half-way
69		11.6	Anthesis completed
Milk development
70			-
71	10.54	12.1	Kernel watery ripe
73		13.0	Early milk
75	11.1		Medium milk
77			Late milk
Dough development
80			-
83		14.0	Early dough
85	11.2		Soft dough
87		15.0	Hard dough
Ripening
90			-
91	11.3		Kernel hard (difficult to divide with thumbnail)
92	11.4	16.0	Kernel hard (no longer dented with thumbnail)
93			Kernel loosening in daytime
94			Overripe, straw dead and collapsing
95			Seed dormant
96			Viable seed giving 50% germination
97			Seed not dormant
98			Secondary dormancy induced
99			Secondary dormancy lost
