= BBCH-scale (olive) =

In biology, the BBCH-scale for olive describes the phenological development of olive trees using the BBCH-scale.

The phenological growth stages and BBCH-identification keys of olive trees are:

Growth stage	Code	Description
0: Bud development	00	Foliar buds at the apex of shoots grown the previous crop-year are completely closed, sharp-pointed, stemless and ochre-coloured.
0: Bud development	01	Foliar buds start to swell and open, showing the new foliar primordia.
0: Bud development	03	Foliar buds lengthen and separate from the base.
0: Bud development	07	External small leaves open, not completely separated, remaining joined by apices.
0: Bud development	09	External small leaves opening further with their tips inter crossing.
1: Leaf development	11	First leaves completely separated. Grey-greenish coloured.
1: Leaf development	15	The leaves are more separated without reaching their final size. First leaves turn greenish on the upperside.
1: Leaf development	19	Leaves get the typical variety size and shape.
3: Shoot development	31	Shoots reach 10% of final size.
3: Shoot development	33	Shoots reach 30% of final size.
3: Shoot development	37	Shoots reach 70% of final size.
5: Inflorescence emergence.	50	Inflorescence buds in leaf axils are completely closed. They are sharp-pointed, stemless and ochre-coloured.
5: Inflorescence emergence.	51	Inflorescence buds start to swell on its stem.
5: Inflorescence emergence.	52	Inflorescence buds open. Flower cluster development starts.
5: Inflorescence emergence.	54	Flower cluster growing
5: Inflorescence emergence.	55	Flower cluster totally expanded. Floral buds start to open.
5: Inflorescence emergence.	57	The corolla, green-coloured, is longer than calyx.
5: Inflorescence emergence.	59	The corolla changes from green to white colour.
6: Flowering	60	First flowers open.
6: Flowering	61	Beginning of flowering: 10% of flowers open.
6: Flowering	65	Full flowering: at least 50% of flowers open.
6: Flowering	67	First petals falling.
6: Flowering	68	Majority of petals fallen or faded.
6: Flowering	69	End of flowering, fruit set, non-fertilized ovaries fallen.
7: Fruit development	71	Fruit size about 10% of final size.
7: Fruit development	75	Fruit size about 50% of final size. Stone starts to lignificate (it shows cutting resistance).
7: Fruit development	79	Fruit size about 90% of final size. Fruit suitable for picking green olives.
8: Maturity of fruit	80	Fruit deep green colour becomes light green, yellowish.
8: Maturity of fruit	81	Beginning of fruit colouring.
8: Maturity of fruit	85	Increasing of specific fruit colouring.
8: Maturity of fruit	89	Harvest maturity: fruits get the typical variety colour, remaining turgid, suitable for oil extraction.
9: Senescence	92	Overripe: fruits lose turgidity and start to fall.
