= BBCH-scale (leafy vegetables not forming heads) =

In biology, the BBCH-scale for leafy vegetables not forming heads describes the phenological development of leafy vegetables not forming heads, such as spinach, loosehead lettuce, and kale, using the BBCH-scale.

The phenological growth stages and BBCH-identification keys of leafy vegetables not forming heads are:

Growth stage	Code	Description
0: Germination	00	Dry seed
0: Germination	01	Beginning of seed imbibition
0: Germination	03	Seed imbibition complete
0: Germination	05	Radicle emerged from seed
0: Germination	07	Hypocotyl with cotyledons breaking through seed coat
0: Germination	09	Emergence: cotyledons break through soil surface
1: Leaf development (Main shoot)	10	Cotyledons completely unfolded; growing point or true leaf initial visible
1: Leaf development (Main shoot)	11	First true leaf unfolded
1: Leaf development (Main shoot)	12	2nd true leaf unfolded
1: Leaf development (Main shoot)	13	3rd true leaf unfolded
1: Leaf development (Main shoot)	1 .	Stages continuous till ...
1: Leaf development (Main shoot)	19	9 or more true leaves unfolded
3: Stem elongation of rosette growth	33	Leaf rosette has reached 30% of the expected diameter typical for the variety.^{1} Main shoot has reached 30% of the expected height typical for the variety²
3: Stem elongation of rosette growth	35	Leaf rosette has reached 50% of the expected diameter typical for the variety.^{1} Main shoot has reached 50% of the expected height typical for the variety²
3: Stem elongation of rosette growth	37	Leaf rosette has reached 70% of the expected diameter typical for the variety.^{1} Main shoot has reached 70% of the expected height for the variety²
3: Stem elongation of rosette growth	39	Rosette development completed^{1} Main shoot has reached the height typical for the variety²
4: Development of harvestable vegetative plant parts	41	10% of the leaf mass typical for the variety reached
4: Development of harvestable vegetative plant parts	42	20% of the leaf mass typical for the variety reached
4: Development of harvestable vegetative plant parts	43	30% of the leaf mass typical for the variety reached
4: Development of harvestable vegetative plant parts	44	40% of the leaf mass typical for the variety reached
4: Development of harvestable vegetative plant parts	45	50% of the leaf mass typical for the variety reached
4: Development of harvestable vegetative plant parts	46	60% of the leaf mass typical for the variety reached
4: Development of harvestable vegetative plant parts	47	70% of the leaf mass typical for the variety reached
4: Development of harvestable vegetative plant parts	48	80% of the leaf mass typical for the variety reached
4: Development of harvestable vegetative plant parts	49	Typical leaf mass reached
5: Inflorescence emergence	51	Main shoot begins to elongate^{1} Main inflorescence visible between uppermost leaves²
5: Inflorescence emergence	53	30% of the expected height of the main shoot reached
5: Inflorescence emergence	55	First individual flowers of main inflorescence visible (still closed)
5: Inflorescence emergence	59	First flower petals visible; flowers still closed
6: Flowering	60	First flowers open (sporadically)
6: Flowering	61	Beginning of flowering: 10% of flowers open
6: Flowering	62	20% of flowers open
6: Flowering	63	30% of flowers open
6: Flowering	64	40% of flowers open
6: Flowering	65	Full flowering: 50% of flowers open
6: Flowering	67	Flowering finishing: majority of petals fallen or dry
6: Flowering	69	End of flowering
7: Development of fruit	71	First fruits formed
7: Development of fruit	72	20% of fruits have reached typical size
7: Development of fruit	73	30% of fruits have reached typical size
7: Development of fruit	74	40% of fruits have reached typical size
7: Development of fruit	75	50% of fruits have reached typical size
7: Development of fruit	76	60% of fruits have reached typical size
7: Development of fruit	77	70% of fruits have reached typical size
7: Development of fruit	78	80% of fruits have reached typical size
7: Development of fruit	79	Fruits have reached typical size
8: Ripening of fruit and seed	81	Beginning of ripening: 10% of fruits ripe, or 10% of seeds of typical colour, dry and hard
8: Ripening of fruit and seed	82	20% of fruits ripe, or 20% of seeds of typical colour, dry and hard
8: Ripening of fruit and seed	83	30% of fruits ripe, or 20% of seeds of typical colour, dry and hard
8: Ripening of fruit and seed	84	40% of fruits ripe, or 20% of seeds of typical colour, dry and hard
8: Ripening of fruit and seed	85	50% of fruits ripe, or 50% of seeds of typical colour, dry and hard
8: Ripening of fruit and seed	86	60% of fruits ripe, or 20% of seeds of typical colour, dry and hard
8: Ripening of fruit and seed	87	70% of fruits ripe, or 20% of seeds of typical colour, dry and hard
8: Ripening of fruit and seed	88	80% of fruits ripe, or 20% of seeds of typical colour, dry and hard
8: Ripening of fruit and seed	89	Fully ripe: seeds on the whole plant of typical colour and hard
9: Senescence
9: Senescence	92	Leaves and shoots beginning to discolor
9: Senescence	95	50% of leaves yellow or dead
9: Senescence	97	Plants dead
99	Harvested product (seeds)	

1. For lettuce varieties without head, spinach and species with rosette-type growth
2. For kale and species without rosette growth
