= BBCH-scale (rice) =

The BBCH-scale (rice) identifies the phenological development stages of rice Oryza sativa. It is a plant species specific version of the BBCH-scale.

Growth stage	Code	Description
0: Germination	00	Dry seed (caryopsis)
0: Germination	01	Beginning of seed imbibition
0: Germination	03	Seed imbibition complete (pigeon breast)
0: Germination	05	Radicle emerged from caryopsis
0: Germination	06	Radicle elongated, root hairs and/or side roots visible
0: Germination	07	Coleoptile emerged from caryopsis (in water-rice this stage occurs before stage 05)
0: Germination	09	Imperfect leaf emerges (still rolled) at the tip of the coleoptile
1: Leaf development^{1, 2}	10	Imperfect leaf unrolled, tip of first true leaf visible
1: Leaf development^{1, 2}	11	First leaf unfolded
1: Leaf development^{1, 2}	12	2 leaves unfolded
1: Leaf development^{1, 2}	13	3 leaves unfolded
1: Leaf development^{1, 2}	1 .	Stages continuous till ...
1: Leaf development^{1, 2}	19	9 or more leaves unfolded
2: Tillering3	21	Beginning of tillering: first tiller detectable
2: Tillering3	22	2 tillers detectable
2: Tillering3	23	3 tillers detectable
2: Tillering3	2 .	Stages continuous till ...
2: Tillering3	29	Maximum number of tillers detectable
3: Stem elongation^{3}	30	Panicle initiation or green ring stage: chlorophyll accumulates in the stem tissue, forming a green ring
3: Stem elongation^{3}	32	Panicle formation: panicle 1–2 mm in length
3: Stem elongation^{3}	34	Internode elongation or jointing stage: internodes begin to elongate, panicle more than 2 mm long (variety-dependent)
3: Stem elongation^{3}	37	Flag leaf just visible, still rolled, panicle moving upwards
3: Stem elongation^{3}	39	Flag leaf stage: flag leaf unfolded, collar regions (auricle and ligule) of flag leaf and penultimate leaf aligned (pre-boot stage)
4: Booting	41	Early boot stage: upper part of stem slightly thickened, sheath of flag leaf about 5 cm out of penultimate leaf sheath
4: Booting	43	Mid boot stage: sheath of flag leaf 5–10 cm out of the penultimate leaf sheath
4: Booting	45	Late boot stage: flag leaf sheath swollen, sheath of flag leaf more than 10 cm out of penultimate leaf sheath
4: Booting	47	Flag leaf sheath opening
4: Booting	49	Flag leaf sheath open
5: Inflorescence emergence, heading^{4}	51	Beginning of panicle emergence: tip of inflorescence emerged from sheath
5: Inflorescence emergence, heading^{4}	52	20% of panicle emerged
5: Inflorescence emergence, heading^{4}	53	30% of panicle emerged
5: Inflorescence emergence, heading^{4}	54	40% of panicle emerged
5: Inflorescence emergence, heading^{4}	55	Middle of panicle emergence: neck node still in sheath
5: Inflorescence emergence, heading^{4}	56	60% of panicle emerged
5: Inflorescence emergence, heading^{4}	57	70% of panicle emerged
5: Inflorescence emergence, heading^{4}	58	80% of panicle emerged
5: Inflorescence emergence, heading^{4}	59	End of panicle emergence: neck node level with the flag leaf auricle, anthers not yet visible
6: Flowering, anthesis	61	Beginning of flowering: anthers visible at top of panicle
6: Flowering, anthesis	65	Full flowering: anthers visible on most spikelets
6: Flowering, anthesis	69	End of flowering: all spikelets have completed flowering but some dehydrated anthers may remain
7: Development of fruit	71	Watery ripe: first grains have reached half their final size
7: Development of fruit	73	Early milk
7: Development of fruit	75	Medium milk: grain content milky
7: Development of fruit	77	Late milk
8: Ripening	83	Early dough
8: Ripening	85	Soft dough: grain content soft but dry, fingernail impression not held, grains and glumes still green
8: Ripening	87	Hard dough: grain content solid, fingernail impression held
8: Ripening	89	Fully ripe: grain hard, difficult to divide with thumbnail
9: Senescence	92	Over-ripe: grain very hard, cannot be dented by thumbnail
9: Senescence	97	Plant dead and collapsing
9: Senescence	99	Harvested product

1 A leaf is unfolded when its ligule is visible or the tip of the next leaf is visible
2 Tillering or stem elongation may occur earlier than stage 13; in this case continue with stages 21 or 30
3 If stem elongation begins before the end of tillering continue with stage 30
4 Flowering usually starts before stage 55; continue with principal stage 6
