= BBCH-scale =

Horticultural tool used to identify the phenological development stages of plants

The BBCH-scale is used to identify the phenological development stages of plants. BBCH-scales have been developed for a range of crop species where similar growth stages of each plant are given the same code.

Phenological development stages of plants are used in a number of scientific disciplines (crop physiology, phytopathology, entomology and plant breeding) and in the agriculture industry (risk assessment of pesticides, timing of pesticide application, fertilization, agricultural insurance). The BBCH-scale uses a decimal code system, which is divided into principal and secondary growth stages, and is based on the cereal code system (Zadoks scale) developed by Jan Zadoks.

The abbreviation BBCH derives from the names of the originally participating stakeholders: "Biologische Bundesanstalt, Bundessortenamt und CHemische Industrie". Allegedly, the abbreviation is said to unofficially represent the four companies that initially sponsored its development; Bayer, BASF, Ciba-Geigy, and Hoechst.

== Basic principles ==
- The BBCH-scale provides a framework to develop scales for individual crops.
- Similar growth stages of each plant species are given the same BBCH code.
- Each code has a description and important growth stages have additional drawings included.
- The first digit of the scale refers to the principal growth stage.
- The second digit refers to the secondary growth stage which corresponds to an ordinal number or percentage value.
- Post harvest or storage treatment is coded as 99.
- Seed treatment before planting is coded as 00.

== Principal growth stages ==
- 0: Germination, sprouting, bud development
- 1: Leaf development
- 2: Formation of side shoots, tillering
- 3: Stem elongation or rosette growth, shoot development
- 4: Development of harvestable vegetative plant parts, bolting
- 5: Inflorescence emergence, heading
- 6: Flowering
- 7: Development of fruit
- 8: Ripening or maturity of fruit and seed
- 9: Senescence, beginning of dormancy

== See also ==
BBCH-scales for plants or plant groups:

- Bean
- Beet
- Bulb vegetable
- Canola, rapeseed
- Cereals
- Citrus
- Coffee
- Cotton
- Cucurbit
- Currants
- Faba bean
- Grape
- Hop
- Leafy vegetables forming heads
- Leafy vegetables not forming heads
- Maize, corn
- Musaceae
- Olive
- Other brassica vegetables
- Pea
- Peanut
- Pome fruit
- Potato
- Rice
- Root and stem vegetable
- Solaneous fruit
- Stone fruit
- Strawberry
- Sunflower
- Weed
