= Radicle =

Radicle forms the future root

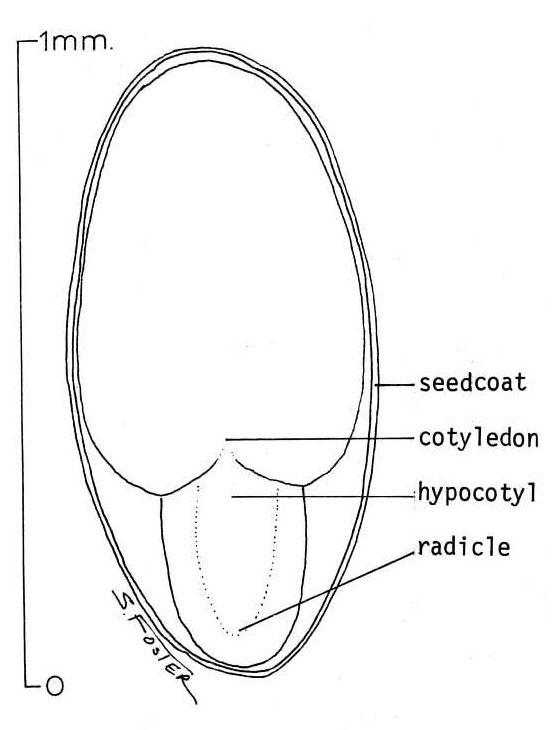
Seed of Scouler's willow (Salix scouleriana)

In botany, the radicle is the first part of a seedling to emerge from the seed, during the process of germination. Germination understood as a biomechanical process describes the radicle with the hypocotyl combined as the embryonic axis in the seed. The radicle emerges from a seed through the micropyle.

The emergence of the radicle is either the end or terminal part (2nd of 2 phases (or) 3rd of 3 phases) or the 5th of 9 stages (Note: within the BBCH-scale) of germinating.

The radicle is the embryonic root of the plant, and grows downward in the soil (positive geotropism). The radicle absorbs water and nutrients from the soil

Radicles are classified into two main types. Those pointing away from the seed coat scar or hilum are classified as antitropous, and those pointing towards the hilum are syntropous.

If the radicle begins to decay, the seedling undergoes pre-emergence damping off. This disease appears on the radicle as darkened spots. Eventually, it causes death of the seedling.

In 1880, Charles Darwin published a book about plants he had studied, The Power of Movement in Plants, where he mentions the radicle.

It is hardly an exaggeration to say that the tip of the radicle thus endowed [..] acts like the brain of one of the lower animals; the brain being situated within the anterior end of the body, receiving impressions from the sense-organs, and directing the several movements.

== See also ==
- Plant perception (physiology)
