= Enno Bahrs =

German agronomists

Enno Bahrs (born 17 September 1967 in Bremen) is an agricultural scientist and economist, and tax expert, at the University of Hohenheim and a member of the Scientific Advisory Board for Biodiversity and Genetic Resources of the German Federal Republic.

== Life and work ==
After an education in practical agriculture Bahrs studied agricultural science and business management at the University of Göttingen and obtained a Ph.D. in 1999 at the same university.

In the year 2000 he passed the tax advisor examination of the Finance Ministry of Lower Saxony, and from 2002 became a Junior Professor for Applied Agriculture at the Georg-August-University in Göttingen. After research visits to Kyrgyzstan and California there followed in 2006 habilitation in Goettingen with the theme: Trading with payment entitlements. Theoretical concepts and practical consequences.

In January 2007 Bahrs was appointed professor at the Institute of Agricultural and Forestry Economics at the University of Natural Resources and Life Sciences, Vienna and in 2009 went to Hohenheim University where he headed the area of Agricultural Business Studies as successor to Juergen Zeddies.

Bahrs is an advisor to the EU project Biofector at the Bundesministerium für Ernährung und Landwirtschaft (Federal Ministry of Nutrition and Agriculture), the Bundesministerium für Finanzen (the Federal Finance Ministry), the Deutschen Gesellschaft für Technische Zusammenarbeit (German Society for Technical Cooperation), the Landwirtschaftlichen Sozialversicherung (Agricultural Social Security) and in the Lower Saxony fiscal court.

Bahrs is married with two children.

== Publications ==
- Publications from Enno Bahrs on the Web Pages Hohenheim University
