= Hans-Peter Liebig =

German agronomist for horticulture

Hans-Peter Liebig (born January 23, 1945, in Neuruppin, Brandenburg) is a German agronomist for horticulture. He was 2002–2012 rector of the University of Hohenheim.

== Biography ==
After studying at the State Engineering Academy for Horticulture in Berlin-Dahlem (1965-1968), he studied at Technische Universität Berlin and graduated in 1972 as a graduate agricultural engineer.

With his dissertation, Influences of endogenous and exogenous factors on the yield formation of cucumbers (Cucumis satuvus L.), Hans-Peter Liebig obtained his doctorate in garden science at Leibniz University Hannover in 1978, where he also habilitated in 1989. After a study and research stay at the Wageningen University he followed in 1991 the reputation as a professor of vegetable cultivation at the University of Hohenheim. After several years as vice-dean, dean and member of the Senate and University Council, he was elected vice-president in 2001. As of October 1, 2002, Liebig was rector of University Hohenheim. On May 7, 2008, the Senate of the university confirmed the previous election of the University Council for a second term of Rector Liebig. After the election by the responsible committee, Rector Liebig took up his additional office on 1 April 2009 as chairman of the State Rectors' Conference Baden-Württemberg. His term ended on March 31, 2012, to his successor in the office of the Hohenheim Rector was elected the agricultural economist Stephan Dabbert.

Liebig is married and has three sons.

== Honors ==
Due to his many years of involvement in research projects in China, he was honored with the Friendship Award (China Friendship Award of the People's Republic of China in 2004. In 2005, he was awarded the honorary title of an honorary doctor of the University of Agricultural Sciences and Veterinary Medicine of Cluj-Napoca (Cluj-Napoca, Romania). In the same year, he was appointed honorary professor of the State Agrarian University in Stavropol (Russia) and the Chinese Agricultural University in Beijing (PRC). In 2009, honorary doctor of honor followed the University of Belgrade.

== Literature ==
- Katrin van Hove: Bericht zur feierlichen Übergabe des Rektorates an Prof. Dr. Hans-Peter Liebig; Hohenheim, 30. September 2002.
- Steinbeis Europa Zentrum: Bericht FemStart Fachforum, Hohenheim 2007.
- Universitätsbund Hohenheim e. V., Mitteilungsblatt 2003, 2005, 2006, 2008 und 2009.
- Manfred G. Raupp (Hrsg.): Aktualne probleme ochrana rastlin. Sympozium Stary Smokovec (Tschechoslowakei) 1990.
