= Markus Weinmann =

Markus Weinmann (born 31 July 1974, in Worms) is an agricultural scientist specialising in the area of Plant Physiology at the University of Hohenheim, and ranks as one of the pioneers of Bioeffector-Research aimed at improving plant growth, vitality and disease resistance. He is also coordinator of field experiments in the EU-Biofector-Project.

== Life and work ==
Weinmann was born into a family of vintners as son of Leonard and Maria-Elisabeth Weinmann and attended primary school in Worms-Hernsheim and then the Rudi-Stephan-Gymnasium in Worms, passing his exams in 1994. After military service (1994-1995) he studied agriculture at Hohenheim University with traineeships in the State School of Agriculture, Viticulture and Horticulture in Oppenheim and the State School of Grapevine Breeding in Alzey.

His Diploma Thesis in the area of phytomedicine at the State Education and Research Centre (SLFA) in Neustadt an der Weinstraße in 1999 was written on the theme Use of arbuscular mycorrhizal fungi and bacterial preparations to counter vine fatigue in viticulture nurseries under controlled and open field conditions.

In 2003 he was accepted as a doctoral student at the Faculty of Agricultural Science at Hohenheim University and he obtained his Ph. D. at the Institute of Plant Nutrition, later Institute of Crop Science, Department of Nutrition Physiology, at Hohenheim University with Volker Roemheld and Guenter Neumann as supervisors. Promotion to Dr. sc. agr followed in May 2016 in Hohenheim.

== Professional activities ==
- 2001 Scientific Assistant in Phytomedicine at the State Education and Research Centre (SLFA) in Neustadt an der Weinstraße
- 2002 and 2003, research project: Investigation of the Influence Plant Strengthening Agents on Growth, Nutrient Suitability and Disease Resistance in Crops, financed by sponsors from the Nordic University Society, Flensburg
- 2003 to 2005, research project: Silicon as a Crop Activator, financed by the Consortium of Industrial Research Societies „Otto von Guericke“ e. V. (AiF) Project GmbH, Berlin and Manfred G. Raupp Madora GmbH, Loerrach
- 2005 to 2008, research project: The Re-establishment of Human Resources, Curricula, Systems and Institutions at the Agricultural Faculty of the Syiah Kuala University in Aceh (ACULTURE), financed by the EuropeAid Co-operation Office in the frame of the ASIA LINK Programme of the European Commission.
- Since 2012 research project: Resource Preservation by Application of Bioeffectors in European Crop Production (BIOFECTOR), financed by the European Commission within the 7th Frame Programme, Grant agreement no: 312117

== Publications (selection) ==
- Huber D., Roemheld V., and Weinmann M. (2012). Relationship between nutrition, plant diseases and pests. In: Marschner P. (ed.). Marschner’s Mineral Nutrition of higher Plants. Third Edition. Academic Press, Elsevier, London, UK, pp. 283–298.
- Akter Z., Weinmann M., Neumann G., Römheld V. (2013). An in-vitro screening method to study the activity potential of biofertilizers based on Trichoderma and Bacillus sp. Journal of Plant Nutrition 36, 1439-1452.
- Nkebiwe P. M., Weinmann M., Bar-Tal A., Müller T. (2016). Fertilizer placement to improve crop nutrient acquisition and yield: A review and meta-analysis. Field Crops Research 196, 389-401.
- Nkebiwe P. M., Weinmann M., and Müller T. (2016). Improving fertilizer depot exploitation and maize growth by inoculation with plant growth promoting bacteria: from lab to field. Chemical and Biological Technologies in Agriculture 3:15, 1-16.
- Bradáčová K., Weber N. F., Morad-Talab N., Asim M., Imran M., Weinmann M., Neumann G. (2016). Micronutrients (Zn/Mn), seaweed extracts, and plant growth promoting bacteria as cold stress protectants in maize. Chemical and Biological Technologies in Agriculture 3:19, 1-10.
- Bio-Effectors for improved Growth, Nutrient Acquisition and Disease Resistance of Crops.
- Publikations of Markus Weinmann on the Web Pages of the University of Hohenheim

== Conference contributions ==
- Rhizosphere 2004 - Perspectives and Challenges, A Tribute to Lorenz Hiltner”, Munich, Germany, 12. – 17. September 2004. Poster Presentation: Weinmann M., Tan B., Römheld V., and Neumann G. (2004). “Selected Strains of Escherichia coli as Biofertilizers in Vegetable Production”.
- Rhizosphere 2”, Montpellier, France, 26. – 31. August 2007. Poster Presentation: Weinmann M., Yusran Y., Neumann G., Schropp A., Römheld V. (2007). “Synergistic effects of Pseudomonas fluorescens ssp. inoculation, arbuscular mycorrhiza and healthy root growth in grapevine and wheat affected by soil sickness”.
- Rhizosphere 3. where Plants Meet Soils Down-under” Perth, Australia, 25. – 30. September 2011. Poster Presentation by V. Römheld und Ayumi Kawanishi: Weinmann M., Kuhn B, Moreno J. G., Neumann G., Römheld V. (2011). “Phosphite applied to the phyllosphere suppresses mechanisms of phosphorus acquisition in the rhizosphere of maize and white lupine”.
- Plant Nutrition 2014. From Basic Understanding to Better Crops. International Conference of the German Society of Plant Nutrion”, Halle and der Saale, Deutschland, 10. – 12. September 2014. Poster Presentation: Weinmann M., Nkebiwe P. M., Weber N., Bradacova K., Li Z.-F., Fora G. Müller T., Neumann G. (2014). “Application strategies and performance of bio-effector preparations to improve the growth and mineral nutrition of crops under field conditions.”
- Rhizosphere 4. Stretching the Interface of Life”, Maastricht, The Netherlands, 21. – 25. June 2015. Poster Presentation: Weinmann M., Nkebiwe M. P., Weber N., Bradacova K., Fora G., Müller T., Neumann G. (2015). “Strategies for bio-effector application to improve the growth and mineral nutrition of maize under field conditions”.
- Micrope. Microbe-Assisted Crop Production – Opportunities, Challenges & Needs”, Vienna, Austria, 23. – 25. November 2015. Poster Presentation: Weinmann M., Nkebiwe P. M., Weber N., Hasan M. M., Poşta G., Müller T., Neumann G. (2015). “Microbial bioeffectors for alternative plant nutrition: development of application strategies in the BioFector project”.
