= Alessandro Piccolo (agricultural scientist) =

Italian chemist and agricultural scientist

Alessandro Piccolo (born 7 July 1951 in Rome) is an Italian chemist and agricultural scientist, with particular expertise in soil science. He is a professor at the University of Naples Federico II and has been honoured with the prize for chemistry in 1999 by the Humboldt Foundation. He received the Doctorate Honoris Causa by the University of Life Sciences of Prague, Czech Republic in 2009. He is chief editor of the Springer journal Chemical and Biological Technologies in Agriculture. He has been coordinator of two research EU projects and a member of numerous other EU research projects such as the project Biofector with the University of Hohenheim. He has published more than 300 peer reviewed scientific papers and he is ranked among the top Italian scientists (http://www.topitalianscientists.org/Top_italian_scientists_VIA-Academy.aspx).

== Life and work ==
After classical studies at High School "E.Q.Visconti" in Rome, he studied chemistry at the University La Sapienza in Rome and obtained a Dr. Phil. Degree cum laude. In 1978, he spent a research period as a Fulbright fellow at the University of Illinois Urbana-Champaign where he also obtained a degree in agricultural chemistry. From 1980 to 1983 he served in Ethiopia as an expert of the United Nations organization FAO at the Ethiopian Institute of Agricultural Research. He then became a tenure researcher at the Institutes for Agricultural Science of the Italian Ministry of Agricultural Science, first in Rome and then in Florence.

In 1992 Piccolo was appointed professor of agricultural chemistry and ecology at the Federico II University of Naples. Within soil chemistry, his particular interests are the molecular nature and dynamics of humic matter and the transformation of agricultural biomass and biorefinery residues in compost and soil.

== Engagements and memberships ==
- Professorship in Agricultural Chemistry and Director of the Interdepartmental Research Centre on NMR for the Environment, Agri-Food and New Materials (CERMANU)es at the University of Naples Federico II
- Doctorates in organic chemistry from the University La Sapienza in Rome and in agricultural science from the University of Illinois Urbana-Champaign
- Honorary Professor at the Czech University of Life Sciences Prague 2009 and the University of Nanjing (2012)
- Scientific member of the European Biofector project with Guenter Neumann and Manfred G. Raupp
- Author of two textbooks and more than 300 peer-reviewed scientific publications (2019)
- Editor of the Springer Open Journal "Chemical and Biological Technologies in Agriculture"

== Awards and recognition ==
- Humboldt Prize for Chemistry of the Alexander von Humboldt Foundation, Bonn (1999)
- Gambrinus Preis for Environmental Chemistry from the University of Dortmund (2004)
- Honorary Doctorate Dr. h.c. of the Czech Agricultural University of Prague (2009)

== Literature ==
- Effects of microbial bioeffectors and P amendments on P forms in a maize cropped soil as evaluated by 31P–NMR spectroscopy / by Meng Li, Vincenza Cozzolino, Pierluigi Mazzei, Marios Drosos, Hiarhi Monda, Zhengyi Hu, Alessandro Piccolo
- Humic-Like Water-Soluble Lignins from Giant Reed (Arundo donax L.) Display Hormone-Like Activity on Plant Growth / by Davide Savy, Luciano Canellas, Giovanni Vinci, Vincenza Cozzolino, Alessandro Piccolo
