= Borbala Biro =

Hungarian Biologist and Economist

Borbala Biro (born 1957, in Debrecen) is a Hungarian soil biologist and lecturer at the Szent-István-University in Gödöllö. She participates in research into the use of biofectors with the University of Hohenheim.

Biro attended vocational college in Kisvárda; the Natural Science Faculty of the University of Kossuth Lajos specialising in terrestrial ecology; obtained habilitation for Plant Cultivation and Horticulture at the West Hungarian University in Mosonmagyaróvár, and a doctorate of the Hungarian Academy of Science.

She was a Royal Society postdoctoral research fellow at Wye College.
