= IBMA =

IBMA may refer to:

- International Biocontrol Manufacturers' Association, an international manufacturers society of biological plant protection products
- International Bluegrass Music Association, a trade association to promote bluegrass music
- International Bluegrass Music Awards, held yearly since 1990
