= Lustadt =

- Municipality
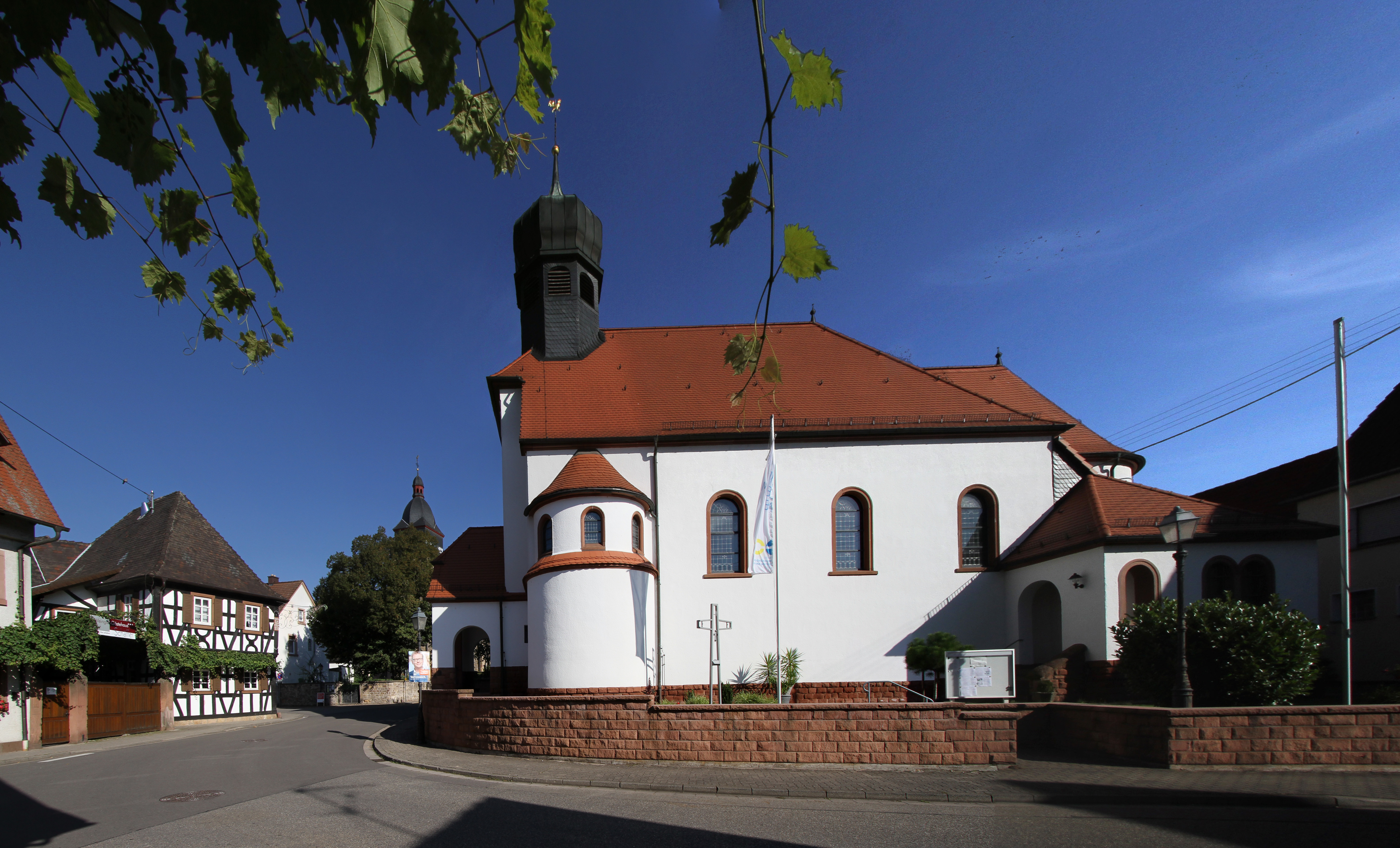

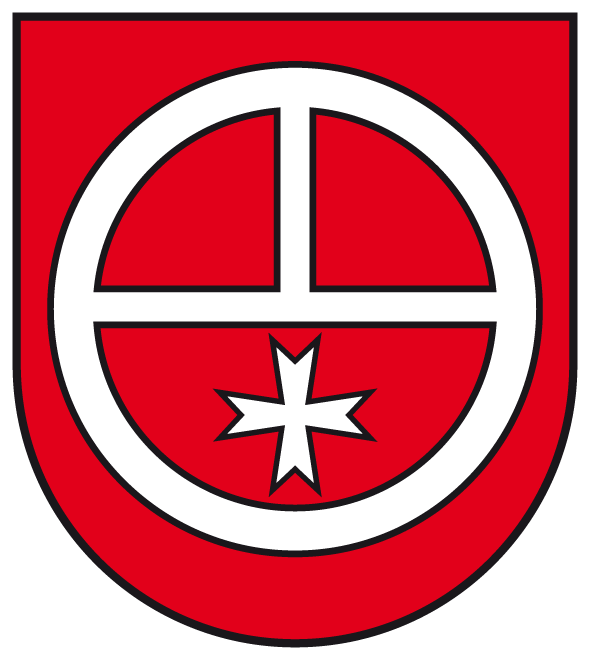
- Coat of arms

- Location of Lustadt within Germersheim district
- Interactive map of Lustadt
- Location within Germany Location within Rhineland-Palatinate
- Coordinates: 49°14′40″N 8°16′27″E
- Country: Germany
- State: Rhineland-Palatinate
- District: Germersheim
- Municipal assoc.: Lingenfeld
- Subdivisions: 2

Government
  - Mayor (2019–24): Volker Hardardt

Area
  - Total: 23.78 km^{2} (9.18 sq mi)
- Elevation: 113 m (371 ft)

Population (2025-12-31)
  - Total: 3,379
  - Density: 142.1/km^{2} (368.0/sq mi)
- Time zone: UTC+01:00 (CET)
  - Summer (DST): UTC+02:00 (CEST)
- Postal codes: 67363
- Dialling codes: 06347
- Vehicle registration: GER
- Website: www.lustadt.de

Lustadt is a municipality in the district of Germersheim, in Rhineland-Palatinate, Germany.

== Personalities ==
=== Sons and Daughters of the Community ===
- Martin Hemmer (1863–1947), Catholic priest and prelate
- Jakob Nagel (1899–1973), engineer and State secretary in the Reich Postal Ministry
- Werner Doppler (* 1941), agricultural economist and economist at the University of Hohenheim

=== People who work or have worked on the ground ===
- Jakob Schwalb (1872-1934), priest, temporally Kaplan in Oberlustadt
- Max Seither (1914-2003), politician (SPD), from 1969 mayor of Lustadt
