= Christoph Schneider (disambiguation) =

Christoph Schneider may refer to

- Christoph Schneider (born 1966), German drummer
- Christoph Schneider (geographer) (born 1965), German geographer, Rector of the University of Hohenheim
- Norman Christoph Schneider, (1888–1985), Canadian politician and businessman
