= Bernard Blum =

Bernard J. Blum (1 September 1938 in Besançon – 13 August 2014 in Paris) was a French agricultural scientist, industry manager and founding president of the International Biocontrol Manufacturers' Association (IBMA). He campaigned for sustainable development through biological and integrated plant protection with the use of decision-making systems.

== Life and work ==
Bernard Blum first went to school in Besançon and later at the Lycée Henri IV in Paris. He studied agricultural science at the Institut National Agronomique, Paris Grignon. After qualifying as an Entomologist in 1963 and obtaining a doctoral degree in Tropical Agriculture in 1965 he started his career at the Agricultural Research Institute I.H.H.O. today CIRAD in the Ivory Coast. At the same time he undertook further education at the International Graduate Business School INSEAD in Fontainebleau, France.

In January 1972 he began work at Ciba-Geigy (today Novartis und Syngenta) in Basel. He was for several decades responsible for entomology and was regional manager for the extensive plant protection markets in the Near East and Africa. It was as regional manager in Africa that he began to use decision-making systems, i.e. the technical possibilities for reducing the use of plant protection agents in cotton crops. His goal was to ensure that natural methods of cultivation and plant protection. At the beginning of the 1990s he founded, together with colleagues, the Académie du Biocontrôle et de la Protection Biologique Intégrée in France. Together with friends he also founded, in 1995, the International Biocontrol Manufacturers Association, of which he was founding president and later vice-president.

In 2008 he initiated the annual ABIM Konferenz which within the frame of the IBMA served to promote new biological products and application technologies.

After leaving Novartis he founded, in 2005, his own firm, AGROMETRIX – Integrated Crop Management. He promoted a return to the consideration of Bio-diversity and an integrated plant protection policy grounded on an analytical system and preventative measures. Inter alia he began, together with the makers of meteorological monitoring stations, the development of crop-specific computer programmes which would give an early warning of risk situations – attack by insects or disease – to allow more targeted intervention using less, and also alternative, agents.

In 2008 he became a member of the Académie d'Agriculture de France with responsibility for the working group Principe de précaution und Méthodes biointensives de protection des plantes.

Within Europe he was engaged with the possibility of introducing the Sterile-Insekten-Technik (SIT) within a European and French project (Region Biocontrol South-West).

He died of a heart attack in 2014.

== Legacy ==
The IBMA awards the annual Bernard Blum Preis for the best innovation in the field of biological plant protection.
