= Alessandro Piccolo =

Alessandro Piccolo may refer to:

- Alessandro Piccolo (agricultural scientist)
- Alessandro Piccolo (racing driver)
