= Abdul Ghafar Lakanwal =

Afghan-American politician and activist

Abdul Ghafar Lakanwal (Pashto: عبدالغفار لکڼوال) is an Afghan-American politician and activist. He served as cabinet minister in Afghan governments in the 1980s.

== Before the revolution ==
Lakanwal hails from rural Afghanistan. He studied agricultural science at Kabul University, and obtained a doctorate from the University of Hohenheim. During the 1970s he worked for the West German international development agency.

== Minister ==
Following the 1978 Saur Revolution, Lakanwal became the chairman of the Peasants Cooperative Union. As of 1980-1981 he was an alternate member of the Central Committee of the People's Democratic Party of Afghanistan. He was a member of the Revolutionary Council of the Democratic Republic of Afghanistan and a Central Committee member of the National Fatherland Front. Lakanwal was named Minister of Agriculture and Land Reform by Babrak Karmal in 1982. On March 12, 1987, following Mohammad Najibullah's ascent to power, Lakanwal was removed from this post.

== Exile ==
He was then named Deputy Foreign Minister in Najibullah's cabinet. Whilst visiting the United Nations General Assembly in New York City in November 1988 along with Prime Minister Mohammad Hasan Sharq, Lakanwal defected. At the time, he was the highest-ranking defector of the PDPA governments so far. Lakanwal sought political asylum in the United States. He eventually became a U.S. citizen. Lakanwal founded the MultiCultural Development Center (MCDC), an anti-racist NGO working in the Twin Cities, in 1991. He served as its executive director. MCDC was closed down in late 2009.
