= Christoph Schneider (geographer) =

Christoph Schneider (born 27 February 1965 in Blaustein-Herrlingen) is a German geographer specialising in climate geography. He has been a professor since 2004 and was vice-president for Research at Humboldt University of Berlin from 2021 to September 2025. In June 2025, he was elected Rector of the University of Hohenheim. He took up his new post on 1 October 2025.

== Life and work ==
After graduating from high school in Ulm and completing his civilian service in the Allgäu region, Christoph Schneider studied geography and physics at the University of Freiburg (1986–1993) and was a research assistant at the Institute of Physical Geography (IPG) from 1994 to 1998. After completing his doctorate in geography at the Faculty of Geosciences at the University of Freiburg in 1998, he was a research assistant at the Institute of Physical Geography (IPG) at the University of Freiburg from 1999 to 2004. He obtained his habilitation in geography at the Faculty of Forestry and Environmental Sciences in Freiburg in 2004 and then worked as a professor of physical geography and climatology at the Institute of Geography at RWTH Aachen University until 2015. Since 2015, he has been Professor of Climate Geography at the Institute of Geography at Humboldt University in Berlin. From August 2021 to July 2026, he was on leave to serve as vice-president for Research at Humboldt University.

Schneider has been working in climate research since 1994. One of his main areas of focus is how climate and global warming are affecting smaller mountain glaciers. He has conducted research projects in the polar regions and high mountains, including Svalbard (Spitsbergen), Patagonia, Tibet, Tian Shan and the low mountain ranges in Germany.

On 27 June 2025, Christoph Schneider was elected as the successor to Stephan Dabbert as the new Rector of the University of Hohenheim for a term of eight years. He took up his new position as Rector of the University of Hohenheim on 1 October 2025.

Schneider is married, has two adult daughters and three grandchildren.

== Further commitments ==
Schneider ist founding member of Scientists for Future.

== Selected publications ==
- Zur raumzeitlichen Differenzierung der Energiebilanz und des Zustandes der Schneedecke auf zwei Gletschern der Marguerite Bay, Antarktische Halbinsel. Aspekte des Klimas und des Klimawandels am Rande der Antarktis. Freiburg 1998, OCLC 215419926.
- mit Johannes Schönbein: Klimatologische Analyse der Schneesicherheit und Beschneibarkeit von Wintersportgebieten in deutschen Mittelgebirgen. Köln 2006, OCLC 165892238
- Lubrich, Oliver; Federhofer, Marie-Theres; Lucht, Wolfgang; Mittwoch, Anne-Christin; Salmond, Mary Anne (2025). Schneider, Christoph (ed.). Blickwinkel KOSMOS – Perspektiven auf Alexander von Humboldts Werk und das Anthropozän. Berlin Universities. doi:10.14279/depositonce-22070. ISBN 978-3-98781-036-7.
- Arndt, Anselm; Schneider, Christoph (2023). "Spatial pattern of glacier mass balance sensitivity to atmospheric forcing in High Mountain Asia". Journal of Glaciology. 69 (278): 1616–1633. Bibcode:2023JGlac..69.1616A. doi:10.1017/jog.2023.46.
- Sauter, Tobias; Arndt, Anselm; Schneider, Christoph (2020). "COSIPY v1.3 – an open-source coupled snowpack and ice surface energy and mass balance model". Geoscientific Model Development. 13 (11): 5645–5662. Bibcode:2020GMD....13.5645S. doi:10.5194/gmd-13-5645-2020.
- Hagedorn, Gregor; et al. (2019). "The concerns of the young protesters are justified: A statement by Scientists for Future concerning the protests for more climate protection". Gaia - Ecological Perspectives for Science and Society. 28 (2): 79–87. Bibcode:2019GEPSS..28...79H. doi:10.14512/gaia.28.2.3. hdl:20.500.11850/350292.
- Weidemann, Stephanie S.; Sauter, Tobias; Malz, Philipp; Jaña, Ricardo; Arigony-Neto, Jorge; Casassa, Gino; Schneider, Christoph (2018). "Glacier Mass Changes of Lake-Terminating Grey and Tyndall Glaciers at the Southern Patagonia Icefield Derived from Geodetic Observations and Energy and Mass Balance Modeling". Frontiers in Earth Science. 6 81. Bibcode:2018FrEaS...6...81W. doi:10.3389/feart.2018.00081.
- Schneider, Christoph; Schnirch, Michael; Acuña, César; Casassa, Gino; Kilian, Rolf (2007). "Glacier inventory of the Gran Campo Nevado Ice Cap in the Southern Andes and glacier changes observed during recent decades". Global and Planetary Change. 59 (1–4): 87–100. Bibcode:2007GPC....59...87S. doi:10.1016/j.gloplacha.2006.11.023.
- Schneider, Christoph; Kilian, Rolf; Glaser, Michael (2007). "Energy balance in the ablation zone during the summer season at the Gran Campo Nevado Ice Cap in the Southern Andes". Global and Planetary Change. 59 (1–4): 175–188. Bibcode:2007GPC....59..175S. doi:10.1016/j.gloplacha.2006.11.033.
- Schneider, Christoph; Gies, Daniel (2004). "Effects of el Niño–southern oscillation on southernmost South America precipitation at 53 °S revealed from NCEP–NCAR reanalyses and weather station data". International Journal of Climatology. 24 (9): 1057–1076. Bibcode:2004IJCli..24.1057S. doi:10.1002/joc.1057.
- Schneider, Christoph (16 June 1998). Zur raumzeitlichen Differenzierung der Energiebilanz und des Zustandes der Schneedecke auf zwei Gletschern der Marguerite Bay, Antarktische Halbinsel - Aspekte des Klimas und des Klimawandels am Rande der Antarktis (Thesis).
- Schneider, Christoph; Glaser, Michael; Kilian, Rolf; Santana, Ariel; Butorovic, Nicolás; Casassa, Gino (2003). "Weather Observations Across the Southern Andes at 53°S". Physical Geography. 24 (2): 97–119. Bibcode:2003PhGeo..24...97S. doi:10.2747/0272-3646.24.2.97.
- Schneider, Christoph (October 1999). "Energy balance estimates during the summer season of glaciers of the Antarctic Peninsula". Global and Planetary Change. 22 (1–4): 117–130. Bibcode:1999GPC....22..117S. doi:10.1016/S0921-8181(99)00030-2.
- Schneider, Christoph (16 June 1998). Zur raumzeitlichen Differenzierung der Energiebilanz und des Zustandes der Schneedecke auf zwei Gletschern der Marguerite Bay, Antarktische Halbinsel - Aspekte des Klimas und des Klimawandels am Rande der Antarktis (Thesis).
- Schneider, Christoph (1998). "Monitoring climate variability on the Antarctic Peninsula by means of observations of the snow cover". Annals of Glaciology. 27: 623–627. Bibcode:1998AnGla..27..623S. doi:10.3189/1998AoG27-1-623-627.
