= Dietrich Büsselberg =

Physiologist, academic, and author

- Born: 19 September 1957 (age 69); Steinhude (Lower Saxony, Germany)
- Occupations: Physiologist, academic and author

Academic background
- Education: BS Biology; MS Biology; PhD Biology
- Alma mater: University of Hohenheim
- Thesis: Kartierung des Makrozoobenthos im Elbe-Urstromtal der Deutschen Bucht (1984); Einfluss von Schwermetallionen auf einen spannungsaktivierten Calcium-Strom der Meeresschnecke Aplysia(1989); Bleiwirkungen auf neuronale Membranströme und synaptische Plastizität(1995)

Academic work
- Institutions: Weill Cornell Medicine–Qatar

Dietrich Büsselberg is a physiologist, academic, and author. He is an associate dean and professor of physiology and biophysics at Weill Cornell Medicine - Qatar.

Büsselberg's research interests are metal toxicology, pharmacology, cell signaling, and anti-cancer drugs. In addition, he is the author of the book Effects of Lead on Neuronal Membrane Currents and Synaptic Plasticity and Experiencing Tanzania: Reflections of a Medical Service Learning Trip Through the Eyes of Aspiring Physicians.

He has been the guest journal editor of several special issues including Plant-Derived Natural Compounds in the Management of Cancer: Significance and Challenges, Significance of Altered (Glucose) Metabolism in Cancers, Advances in Cancer Glycobiology,Chemopreventive and Therapeutic Potential of Phytochemicals and Their Analogs against Cancer, Microbiome in the Growth and Management of Different Types of Cancer, Health Benefits of Flavonoids in Diabetes and Obesity: From Experimental Approaches to Clinical Use

== Education ==
Büsselberg earned a state examination for teaching at the University of Hanover (1981). He got his Bachelor's and Master's degrees in biology from the University of Hohenheim in 1986. In 1989, he received a Ph.D. from the University of Hohenheim in collaboration with the University of Albany. He concluded his Post-Doctoral Fellowship in Physiology from the University of Mainz and the Heinrich-Heine University Düsseldorf in 1995.

== Career ==
Büsselberg started his academic career in 1997 by joining the Institute of Physiology, University of Göttingen, becoming Apl. Professor in 2000. From 2008 to 2010, he was appointed as professor of neuroscience and physiology at the Paul L. Foster School of Medicine at Texas Tech University in Texas, U.S. As of 2010, he has been a professor of physiology and biophysics at Weill Cornell Medical College in Qatar.

Büsselberg has held multiple administrative appointments. In 2012, he was appointed as the assistant dean for student affairs at Weill Cornell Medicine – Qatar and served until 2020. As of late 2020, he is the associate dean at Weill Cornell Medicine – Qatar.

== Research ==
Büsselberg has authored more than 200 peer-reviewed publications, books, and book-chapters. His research encompasses metal toxicity and cancer biology, lately focusing on anticancer therapy by natural substances.

Büsselberg's research interests have focused on the field of physiology. More specifically, his work has been focused on pharmacology, cell signaling, and cancer research by employing electrophysiological and molecular methodologies and cellular imaging techniques. More recently, he and his team have been investigating cancer therapeutics and anticancer drug screening for the treatment of different cancer types, such as breast, colorectal, neuroblastoma, and prostate. Their research also examines the relationship between cancer risk and progression and diabetes, as well as the effect of chemotherapy on intracellular calcium signaling in cancer cells and the mechanisms underlying chemoresistance.

Büsselberg has studied the interaction of chemicals with pharmacological and toxic qualities with the physiology of cancerous and non-cancerous cells. He has a research background studying apoptosis, cytotoxicity, using electrophysiology, and other molecular biological techniques. He is currently the lead principal investigator for the ongoing research project titled, Diabetes and colorectal cancer – molecular risk association, characterization of mechanisms and identification of molecular signature(s)/biomarker(s) and Anti-diabetic drugs in the treatment of breast cancer – identifying the molecular mechanism(s) and key biomarker(s).

== Awards and honors ==
- 1994 – Reinhard Heynen and Emmi Heynen Prize, Heinrich-Heine Universität Düsseldorf

== Personal life ==
Büsselberg is fond of photography as well. He documented his entire journey to Tanzania in two picture books entitled Tanzania: Reflections of a Medical Service Learning Trip Through the Eyes of Aspiring Physicians and A Tanzanian Experience: Learning about Medicine and Life in Mwanza, which was later displayed in the Weill Cornell Medicine – Qatar photography exhibition.

== Bibliography ==
=== Books ===
- Bleiwirkungen auf neuronale Membranströme und synaptische Plastizität. Habilitationsschrift (1995) ISBN 3895740640
- Experiencing Tanzania: Reflections of a Medical Service Learning Trip Through the Eyes of Aspiring Physicians (2019) ISBN 9789927129643

=== Selected articles ===
- Florea, A. M., & Büsselberg, D. (2006). Occurrence, use and potential toxic effects of metals and metal compounds. Biometals, 19(4), 419–427.
- Florea, A. M., & Büsselberg, D. (2011). Cisplatin as an anti-tumor drug: cellular mechanisms of activity, drug resistance and induced side effects. Cancers, 3(1), 1351–1371.
- Rathore, R., McCallum, J. E., Varghese, E., Florea, A. M., & Büsselberg, D. (2017). Overcoming chemotherapy drug resistance by targeting inhibitors of apoptosis proteins (IAPs). Apoptosis, 22(7), 898–919.
- Abotaleb, M., Samuel, S. M., Varghese, E., Varghese, S., Kubatka, P., Liskova, A., & Büsselberg, D. (2018). Flavonoids in cancer and apoptosis. Cancers, 11(1), 28.
- Al-Ishaq, R. K., Abotaleb, M., Kubatka, P., Kajo, K., & Büsselberg, D. (2019). Flavonoids and their anti-diabetic effects: cellular mechanisms and effects to improve blood sugar levels. Biomolecules, 9(9), 430.
- Samuel, S. M., Varghese, E., & Büsselberg, D. (2021). Therapeutic potential of metformin in COVID-19: reasoning for its protective role. Trends in microbiology, 29(10), 894–907.
