= Ralf T. Voegele =

German microbiologist

Ralf Thomas Voegele (born 19 October 1963 in Gottmadingen, Germany) is a German Biologist, specialising in Microbiology. He is Professor of Phytopathology and Dean of the Agricultural Science Faculty at the University of Hohenheim.

== Life and work ==
After primary school in Gottmadingen Ralph Voegele attended the Friedrich-Wöhler-Gymnasium in Singen, taking his school-leaving examinations in 1983. He studied biology at the University of Constance, obtained a further qualification in microbiology, and started work as a scientist in 1987.

He obtained a doctorate (Dr. rer. nat., magna cum laude) in the field of biology in 1993, and then obtained a DFG grant for post-doctoral studies at the College of Biological Science of the University of Guelph and McMaster University in Hamilton, Canada. On his return to the University of Constance he made a habilitation at the Department of Mathematics and Natural Sciences, with a thesis entitled: The Role of Haustoria in the Biotrophic Interaction of the Rust Fungus Uromyces fabae and its Host Plant Vicia faba. There followed the award of the venia legend for Phytopathology and Microbiology, and appointment to the academic board.

In 2010 Voegele was awarded a professorship in phytopathology at the University of Hohenheim, where initially he was also managing director of the Institute of Phytomedicine (2010-2014) and later dean of the Faculty of Agricultural Science.

Ralf Voegele is married and has a daughter.
