= Ruediger Heining =

German economist and agricultural scientist

Ruediger Heining (born 1968 in Bielefeld, West Germany) is a German economist and agricultural scientist. He is regarded as an expert on vocational education and development in South-West Europe and the Caucasus. From 2017 to 2022, he served as managing director of DEULA Baden-Württemberg in Kirchheim unter Teck and as vice-president of the Bundesverband DEULA (German Training Centre for Agricultural Engineering).

From October 2022 to February 2026, Heining has been managing director of the "Center for Nursing, Social Professions and Volunteering Non-Profit Society mbH" in Maria Bildhausen, where he is responsible for establishing the Barbara Stamm Academy. Since March 2026, Heining has been working as a management consultant in Waiblingen. He is a member of the ELIZA Group Zurich.

== Life and work ==
From 1993, Heining studied management, agricultural economics, agricultural policy, business management, and marketing at the University of Hohenheim, graduating with a diploma in 1998. He later pursued a master's degree in international agricultural economics under Franz Heidhues and Jürgen Zeddies at the same university. In addition, he completed studies in e-learning systems and in synchronous and asynchronous e-learning software at the University of Hagen, receiving certificates in each program.

From 1998 to 2004, Heining worked as a research assistant, first at the East European Centre of the University of Hohenheim. From 2001, he served as head of the Eastern Europe division at the university's project enterprise, IBH GmbH, where he managed EU-PHARE, EU-TACIS, EU research, and EU Twinning projects. He was also responsible for implementing the Leonardo da Vinci project in Germany, Slovakia, and Romania. Since 2010, he has worked as an expert for the World Bank, contributing to the project "Quality Management and Customer Orientation in Agricultural Administration."

Through various foreign assignments with EU Twinning projects, Heining later worked with the United Nations Development Programme (UNDP) in Georgia, where he served as a diplomat and project manager in establishing a vocational training system. In March 2017, he became managing director of DEULA Baden-Württemberg, and in 2018, vice-president of the federal association DEULA e.V. He is also a member of the supervisory board of the German-Romanian Centre for Specialist Training and Continuing Education in Voiteg, Romania.

== International engagement ==
- Assignment under the Austrian–German Twinning Project "Strengthening the Political Decision-Making Capacity of the Ministry of Agriculture and Rural Development in Romania", commissioned by the German Federal Ministry of Food, Agriculture and Consumer Protection in cooperation with Agrarmarkt Austria (2006–2009).
- Assignment in Romania for functional assessments of public administration (contract with the World Bank); project leader for the identification and registration of animals in Romania on behalf of the German Federal Ministry of Food, Agriculture and Consumer Protection.
- Assignment with the German Twinning Project "Strengthening of Initial Vocational Training in the Area of Agriculture in the Republic of Azerbaijan", on behalf of the German Federal Ministry of Food, Agriculture and Consumer Protection.
- Assignment in Cyprus for functional assessments of agricultural public administration (contract with the World Bank). Also involved in the implementation of a strategic planning system in the Romanian government, with a focus on the Ministry of Agriculture and Rural Development (contract with the World Bank).
- Assignment as project manager of the United Nations Development Programme in Georgia, responsible for the project "Modernisation of the Vocational Training and Education Systems in Connection with Agriculture in Georgia".

== Publications (selection) ==
- Heining, R. (1999). The setting up of partnership: Summary of the results of Working Group 3 of the conference "Cooperatives as Entrepreneurs in Europe in the Year 2000" (Bologna, 30 November – 1 December 1999). Conference transcript. European Commission, DG XXIII.
- Heining, R., & Bara, S. (1999). "Agriculture – An important economic sector for Romania: Analysis and possible development." South-East Europe Review, 2(3), 95–110. Baden-Baden.
- Heining, R., Otiman, P., & Heidhues, F. (2000). "Experiences from institution sequencing and timing in Romania's rural financial sector." In: Managing Tomorrow's Agriculture: Incentives, Institutions, Infrastructure and Innovations. Proceedings of the IAAE Conference, Mini-Symposium "Institution Sequencing and Timing in Transition Economies", Berlin.
- Heining, R., & Böttcher, D. (2000). "Agricultural producer associations and their role in the development of Romanian rural areas within EU integration." In: Lucrări Ştiinţifice, Management Agricol, Vol. II. Timișoara: Editura Agroprint.
- Buchenrieder, G., Heining, R., & Heidhues, F. (2001). Development of rural finance markets for smallholder farmers in Romania – Concept for rural finance market development in transforming economies. Stuttgart: Grauer Verlag.
