= Patrick Webb (nutritionist) =

British global development specialist

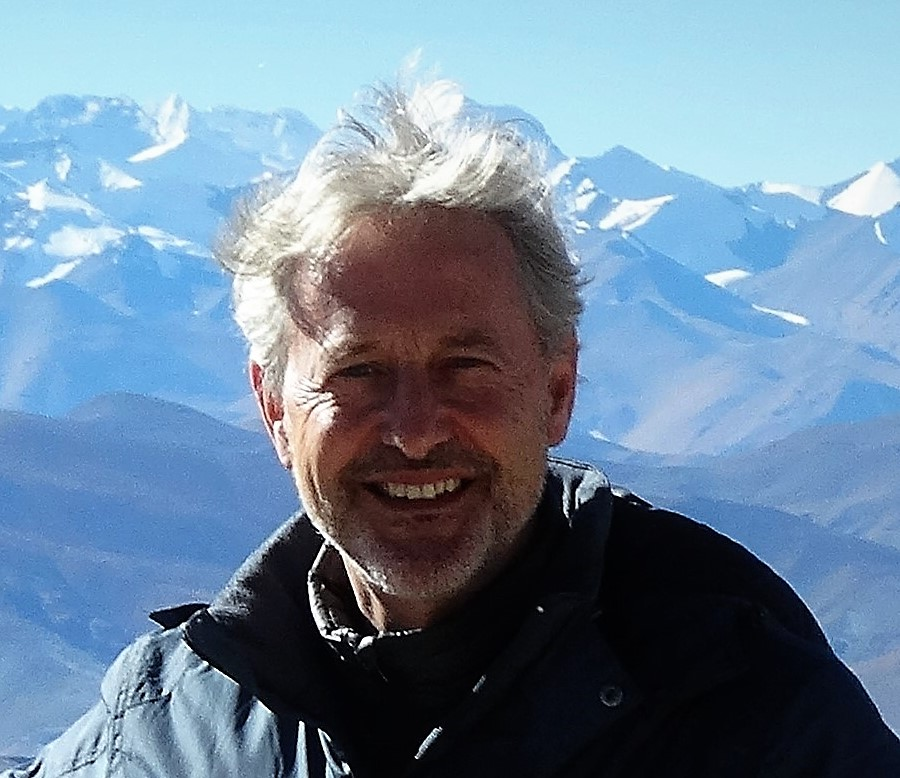

Director, Ashley School of Global Development and the Environment

Personal details
- Born: 10 March 1959 (age 67) Wells, Somerset, England
- Education: B.A.(hons.) in geography in the School of African and Asian Studies at Sussex University (1980); M.A. in African Studies from the Centre of West African Studies (1981); PhD in Geography from the University of Birmingham (1989).

Patrick Webb (born 10 March 1959) is the inaugural Executive Director of the Ashley School of Global Development and the Environment at Cornell University. He served as Chief Nutritionist for the United States Agency for International Development USAID from Feb 2004 through Oct 2025. He was Dean for Academic Affairs at Tufts University's Friedman School of Nutrition from 2005 to 2014. In 2024, he was awarded the prestigious 'Jean-Pierre Habicht Lifetime Achievements in Global Nutrition Research' Award by the American Society for Nutrition. He was also listed among the top 2% of highly-cited scientists across all disciplines globally.

== Biography ==
Before joining Cornell, Patrick held the Alexander McFarlane endowed chair at the Friedman School of Nutrition Science and Policy at Tufts University. He also held appointments at the Fletcher School of Law and Diplomacy, Tufts University, at the Patan Academy of Health Sciences in Kathmandu, Nepal, and at the University of Hohenheim, Stuttgart, Germany. He served from 2014 to 2024 as Technical Adviser to the Global Panel on Agriculture and Food Systems for Nutrition. Webb was previously Chief of Nutrition for the United Nations World Food Programme (WFP) from 2003 to 2005, and a Research Fellow at the International Food Policy Research Institute from 1989 through 1994.

A British citizen with dual US nationality, Patrick Webb holds an undergraduate degree in geography from Sussex University, a master's degree from the Centre for West Africa Studies at the University of Birmingham, and a Doctor of Philosophy degree in geography from the University of Birmingham. He was elected as a Fellow of the Royal Geographical Society in 1984. He attended The Blue School, Wells in Somerset from 1971 to 1979.

Webb is one of the world's most influential voices in the fields of food policy, climate change, and nutrition, including as these relate to the domain of humanitarian intervention. He is also a widely known authority on food security, agriculture and nutrition policies, and food assistance. He led the United States Agency for International Development's review of food aid quality from 2009 to 2021, served on the United Nations' Hunger Task Force from 2003 through 2005, was Director of the USAID-supported Feed the Future Nutrition Innovation Lab, 2010–2020, and of the Food Systems for Nutrition Innovation Lab (2021-2025).

Webb has been a board member for the Nevin Scrimshaw International Nutrition Foundation, the Quarterly Journal of International Agriculture, the Scientific Advisory Council of Biodiversity International, the Undernutrition steering committee of the Sackler Institute of Nutrition Science Research at the New York Academy of Sciences, the Advisory Group on Agriculture and Nutrition for the Millennium Villages Project, and of Food Security. He was in North Korea for the 2004 survey of nutrition, health and mortality, on the ground in Aceh after the 2004 tsunami, as well as in Haiti after the 2010 earthquake. He was a member of the Maternal and Child Nutrition Study Group that oversaw the 2013 Lancet Series on nutrition. Webb was part of the WHO/UNICEF Technical expert advisory group on nutrition monitoring (TEAM), a member of the Research Committee of the Consortium of Universities for Global Health, a Founding Member of the Society for Implementation Science in Nutrition (SISN), and a Council Member of the Independent Science and Partnership Council (ISPC) of the Consultative Group on International Agriculture Research (CGIAR). He served as Vice Chair of the European Commission's High Level Expert Group on Science-Policy Interfaces for Food System Transformation (2020-2022). Most recently, he was appointed in 2021 to the Steering Committee of the High Level Panel of Experts of the Committee on World Food Security, and was named in 2022 as a Commissioner for the second Eat-Lancet Commission on Planetary Health Diets.

== Publications ==
Webb has authored over 220 peer-reviewed journal articles, as well as multiple books and book chapters. His 1994 book on Famine and Food Security in Ethiopia: Lessons for Africa. Chichester, UK: John Wiley, co-authored with Joachim von Braun, was reviewed in the New Scientist under the title,"A hard row to hoe" by Michael Cross on 24 September 1994. The reviewer wrote that "not many academic books can move a reviewer to tears. This one did."

Webb's subsequent book from 1999 on Famine in Africa: Causes, Responses and Prevention. Baltimore, MD: Johns Hopkins University Press was reviewed as "among the best of primers on current knowledge on famine prevention, market integration and malfunction, and household food security" by the Humanitarian Times, 17 Feb 1999. He has also pursued published research on broader public health issues, including tobacco use, HIV/AIDS , and child care practices. His current research is focused on how diets and food systems interact with climate change, ecological degradation and social justice concerns. Patrick is now a thought leader in the domains that link human and planetary health.

Recent noteworthy publications include:

- Rockström, Johan (2025). "The EAT–Lancet Commission on healthy, sustainable, and just food systems". The Lancet. 406 (10512): 1625–1700. doi:10.1016/S0140-6736(25)01201-2. ISSN 0140-6736.
- Schneider, Kate (2023). "The State of Food Systems Worldwide: Counting Down to 2030". Nature Food. 4: 1090–1110. doi:10.1038/s43016-023-00885-9. hdl:11573/1699106. PMC 10730405. PMID 38114693.
- Singh, Brajesh (2022). "Food systems transformation requires science–policy–society interfaces that integrate existing global networks and new knowledge hubs". Nature Food. 3 (12): 1–3. doi:10.1038/s43016-022-00664-y. PMID 37118566.
- Benton, Tim (2021). "A 'net zero' equivalent goal for transforming food systems". Nature Food. 2 (12): 905–906. doi:10.1038/s43016-021-00434-2. PMID 37118240. S2CID 244880713.
- Springmann, Marco (2021). "The global and regional costs of healthy and sustainable dietary patterns: a modelling study". Lancet Planetary Health. 5 (11): 797–807. doi:10.1016/S2542-5196(21)00251-5. PMC 8581186. PMID 34715058.
- Zanello, Giacomo (2020). "Physical activity, time use, and food intakes of rural households in Ghana, India, and Nepal". Scientific Data. 7 (1): 71. Bibcode:2020NatSD...7...71Z. doi:10.1038/s41597-020-0414-x. PMC 7054409. PMID 32127539.
- Tomich, Thomas (2018). "Food and agricultural innovation pathways for prosperity". Agricultural Systems. 172: 1–15. doi:10.1016/j.agsy.2018.01.002.
- Green, Rosemary (January 2016). "Global dietary quality, undernutrition and non-communicable disease: a longitudinal modelling study". BMJ Open. 6 (1) e009331. doi:10.1136/bmjopen-2015-009331. PMC 4716260. PMID 26758259.
- Webb, Patrick (2015). "Measuring Facets of Malnutrition Simultaneously: The Missing Link in Setting Nutrition Targets and Policymaking". Food Security. 7 (3): 479–492. doi:10.1007/s12571-015-0450-0.
- Bhutta, Zulfigar (August 2013). "Evidence based interventions for improving maternal and child nutrition: what can be done and at what cost?". Lancet. 382 (9890): 452–477. doi:10.1016/S0140-6736(13)60996-4. PMID 23746776. S2CID 11748341.
- Pingali, Prabhu (31 July 2012). "Paths of Convergence for Agriculture, Health and Wealth". Proceedings of the National Academy of Sciences. 109 (31): 12294–12301. doi:10.1073/pnas.0912951109. PMC 3412024. PMID 22826252.
- Webb, Patrick (31 July 2012). "Support for agriculture during economic transformation". Proceedings of the National Academy of Sciences. 109 (31): 12309–12314. doi:10.1073/pnas.0913334108. PMC 3411984. PMID 21173245.
- Webb, Patrick (2010). "Medium-to-long run implications of high food prices". Journal of Nutrition. 140 (1): 143S–147S. doi:10.3945/jn.109.110536. PMID 19923389.

Select Op-Eds/Interviews

- donor-and-why-that-might-not-be-such-a-great-thing/, Podcast interview on Food Aid in the 21st Century, June 2018.
- "To end malnutrition we must step up to the plate with data on what people eat", The Guardian, 16 October 2015.
- "The Prize and the Price of Good Nutrition", Journal of the Institute of Medicine, December 2013.
- "Feeding 9 Billion", About Harvest, 14 February 2012.
- "Somali Famine Crisis", Canadian Broadcasting Corporation, 25 July 2011.
- "How far have we come on nutrition?", World Food Programme, 17 June 2011.
- "Reducing Poverty Stresses Food Systems", Deutsche Welle, 11 May 2011.
- "US to Supply Healthier Food to World's Hungry.", Voice of America, 21 April 2011.
- "Cyclone: Q & A on international aid", The Boston Globe, 6 May 2008.
- "How a Volcano Eruption Wiped Away Summer", National Public Radio, 27 October 2007.
- "Loss of an egg can be tipping point for the malnourished", The Financial Times, 13 March 2006.
- "The Invisible Crisis in Niger", The Globe and Mail, 26 August 2005.
- "Lifeline profile", The Lancet, 15 May 2004

Video presentations/webcasts

- ,"Feed the Future Innovation Lab for Nutrition", 6 November 2015.
- , "Mapping Nutrition Innovation Lab Research: How does it all fit together?", Seminar on 'Understanding Agriculture to Nutrition Linkages: A Rapidly Moving Agenda', Washington, D.C., 30 September 2015.
- , "The Weight of the World", Chicago Council on Global Affairs 2015 Global Food Security Forum, Washington, D.C., 21 April 2015.
- , "What is Evidence", Workshop in Kathmandu, Nepal, organized by the USAID Feed the Future Nutrition Innovation Lab, 25 February 2015.
- , "Agriculture & nutrition. what do we know, and what do we still need to know?" Science Forum Bonn 2013
- , "Leontief Prize 2012 - Introduction", 4 April 2012.
- "Tackling Diets and Nutrition", Feeding the World Economist Conferences, Geneva, February 2012.
- "Haiti's Food and Nutrition Situation", Tufts University seminar, October 2011.
- Panel Discussion hosted by Doctors Without Borders at Boston Public Library, November 2010. Webcast online.
- "Policy Support for Agriculture, Nutrition and Health" Presentation on Food Insecurity, the Growing Burden of Over- and Under- Nutrition and Food Safety, 2nd International Roadmap Development Workshop, McGill University, Montreal, September 2010.
- "Implications of the World Food Price Crisis on Nutrition", 14th International Congress of Nutrition, Bangkok, October 2009.

Blogs

- , No Time to Lose: A Wasting Reset, 4 Nov 2021
- , Social Bridging Matters as Much as Social Distancing during these challenging Times, March 2020.
- , When Counting Things that Matter, It Matters What we Count, Global Panel on Agriculture and Food Systems for Nutrition, October 2015.
- , To end malnutrition we must step up to the plate with data on what people really eat, Global Panel on Agriculture and Food Systems for Nutrition, October 2015.
- , Climate change means just that - we must change with the climate, Global Panel on Agriculture and Food Systems for Nutrition, September 2015.
- , Meeting SDG targets through diversified high quality diets, with Jeff Waage, Global Panel on Agriculture and Food Systems for Nutrition, September 2015.
- , It's time to stop counting calories and focus on diet quality and policies that reduce malnutrition, Global Panel on Agriculture and Food Systems for Nutrition, September 2015.
- , Finances are necessary for development, but they are not sufficient, Global Panel on Agriculture and Food Systems for Nutrition, July 2015.
- , Tragedy in Nepal highlights the need to address fragile institutions, Global Panel on Agriculture and Food Systems for Nutrition, April 2015.
- , Why nutrition must feature prominently in the post-2015 Sustainable Development Goals, Global Panel on Agriculture and Food Systems for Nutrition, March 2015.
