= Bioeffector =

A bioeffector is a viable microorganism or active natural compound which directly or indirectly affects plant performance (biofertilizer), and thus has the potential to reduce fertilizer and pesticide use in crop production.

== Types ==
Bioeffectors directly or indirectly affect plant performance by influencing the functional implementation or activation of biological mechanisms, particularly those interfering with soil-plant-microbe interactions. In contrast to conventional fertilizers and pesticides, the effectiveness of bioeffectors is not based on a substantial direct input of mineral plant nutrients, either in inorganic or organic forms.

- Products in use are:
  - Microbial residues,
  - Composting and fermentation products,
  - Plant and algae extracts
- Bioeffector-preparations (bio-agents) as ready-formulated products are applied:
  - to stimulate plant growth (bio-stimulants),
  - to improve plant nutrient acquisition (bio-fertilizers),
  - to protect plants from pathogens and pests (bio-control agents)
  - or generally to advance cropping efficiency; they can contain one or more bio-effectors along with other substances”
- Well-established bioeffectors with documented positive results at the field level are:
  - Rhizobia strains for soil or seed inoculation as a prerequisite for symbiotic N2-fixation when establishing new legume species or varieties.
  - positive effects of mycorrhiza inoculation for soils with a (temporarily) low potential for natural root mycorrhization.
  - sufficient mycorrhization enhances nutrient (P) and water uptake and increases resistance to pathogenic fungi.
- Further mechanisms for the positive impact of bioeffectors on plant growth have postulated, promising a high potential for resource preservation due to reduction of fertiliser and pesticide use:
  - Active nutrient mobilisation by exudation of acids and carboxylates (e.g. P-mobilisation),
  - exudation of micro-nutrient mobilising siderophores/chelates (e.g. Fe^{3+}),
  - reduction of trace elements from less soluble oxidised to highly soluble reduced forms (e.g., Fe^{3+} to Fe^{2+}, Mn^{4+} to Mn^{2+}),
  - associative/non-symbiotic N_{2}-fixation, protective antagonism to plant pathogens,
  - enhancement of mycorrhizal infection and growth, and stimulating hormonal effects.

== Research and Public Dissemination ==
Under the Acronym Biofector the European Union supported the research of Bioeffectors under the leadership of the University of Hohenheim. Coordinator Guenter Neumann, Projectmembers: Jiří Balík, Borbala Biro, Karl Fritz Lauer, Uwe Ludewig, Torsten Müller, Alessandro Piccolo, Manfred G. Raupp, Kornelia Smalla, Pavel Tlustoš, Markus Weinmann. The results of the project are summarized in the project final report.

Other Biostimulants Organisations are European Biostimulant Industry Council, International Biocontrol Manufacturers' Association and Annual Biocontrol Industry Meeting.
