= Schwaig =

Schwaig bei Nürnberg
- Municipality
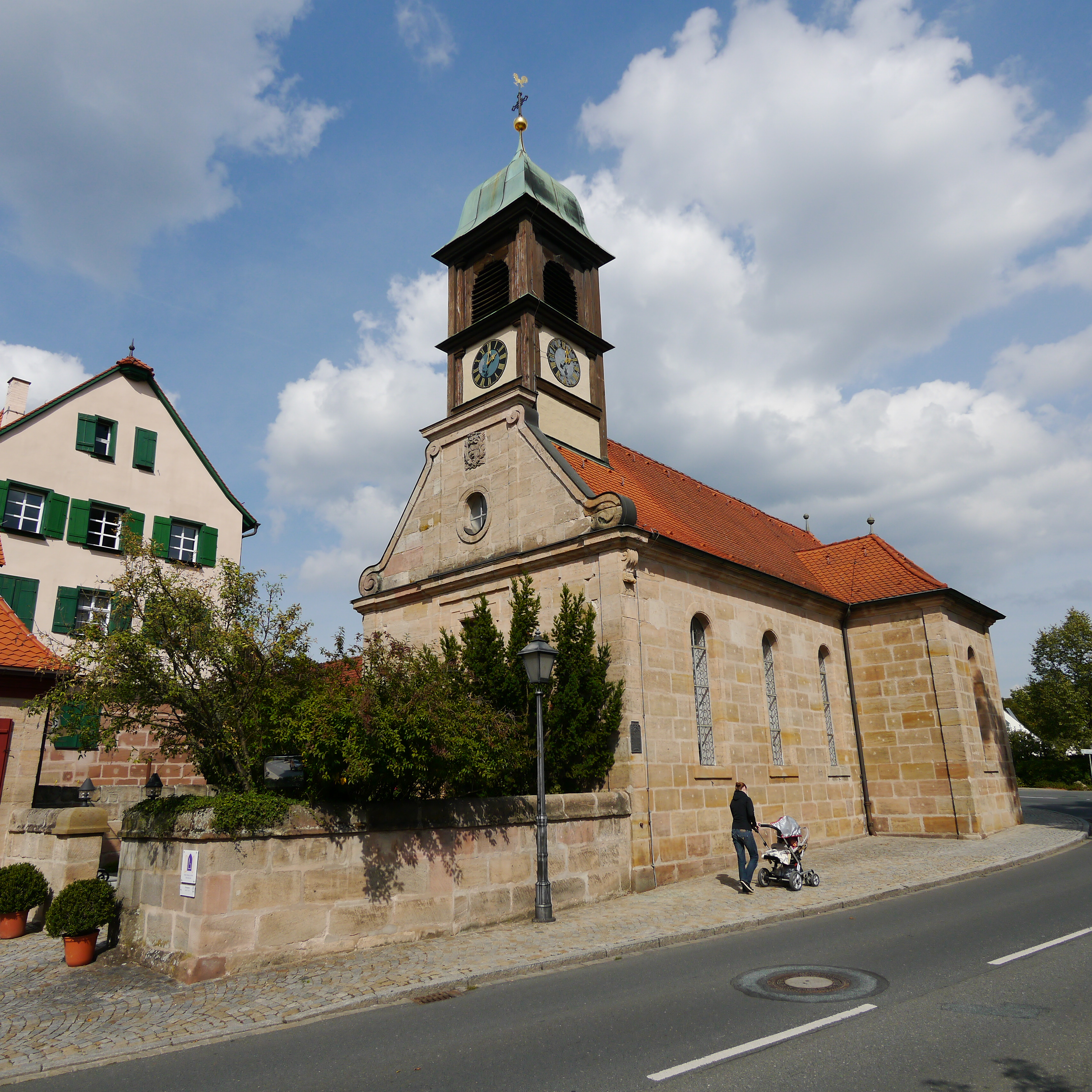
- Saint Magdalene Church

- Coat of arms

- Location of Schwaig bei Nürnberg within Nürnberger Land district
- Interactive map of Schwaig bei Nürnberg
- Location within Germany Location within Bavaria
- Coordinates: 49°28′09″N 11°12′03″E
- Country: Germany
- State: Bavaria
- Admin. region: Mittelfranken
- District: Nürnberger Land

Government
  - Mayor (2020–26): Thomas Wittmann (FW)

Area
  - Total: 5.9 km^{2} (2.3 sq mi)
- Elevation: 320 m (1,050 ft)

Population (2025-12-31)
  - Total: 8,910
  - Density: 1,500/km^{2} (3,900/sq mi)
- Time zone: UTC+01:00 (CET)
  - Summer (DST): UTC+02:00 (CEST)
- Postal codes: 90571
- Dialling codes: 0911
- Vehicle registration: LAU, ESB, HEB, N, PEG
- Website: www.schwaig.de

Schwaig bei Nürnberg (German pronunciation: [ˈʃvaɪk baɪ ˈnʏʁnbɛʁk], lit. 'Schwaig near Nuremberg') is a municipality that is located within the district of Nürnberger Land of Bavaria in Germany.

In 1979, the municipalities of Schwaig and Behringersdorf were merged to form the current municipality. Behringersdorf has a railway station on the Nuremberg–Cheb railway.

== Notable people ==
- Hans-Johann Färber (born 1947), Olympic rower
- Oliver Zeidler (born 1996), rower
- Volker Roemheld (1941 – 2013), agricultural scientist
