= Satyabrata Sarkar =

Indian botanist (1928–2022)

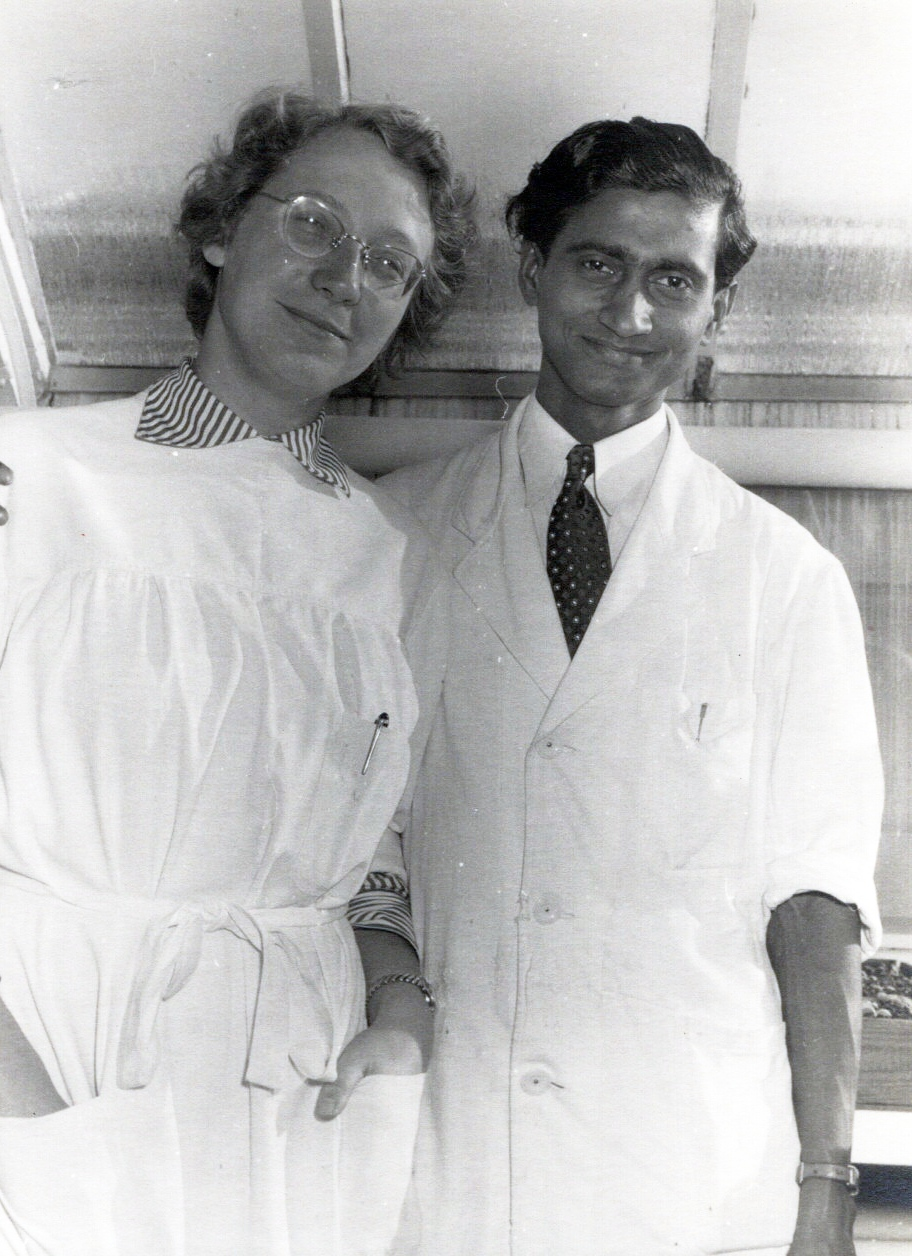
Research couple Ursula and Satyabrata Sarkar in Tübingen Germany 1957

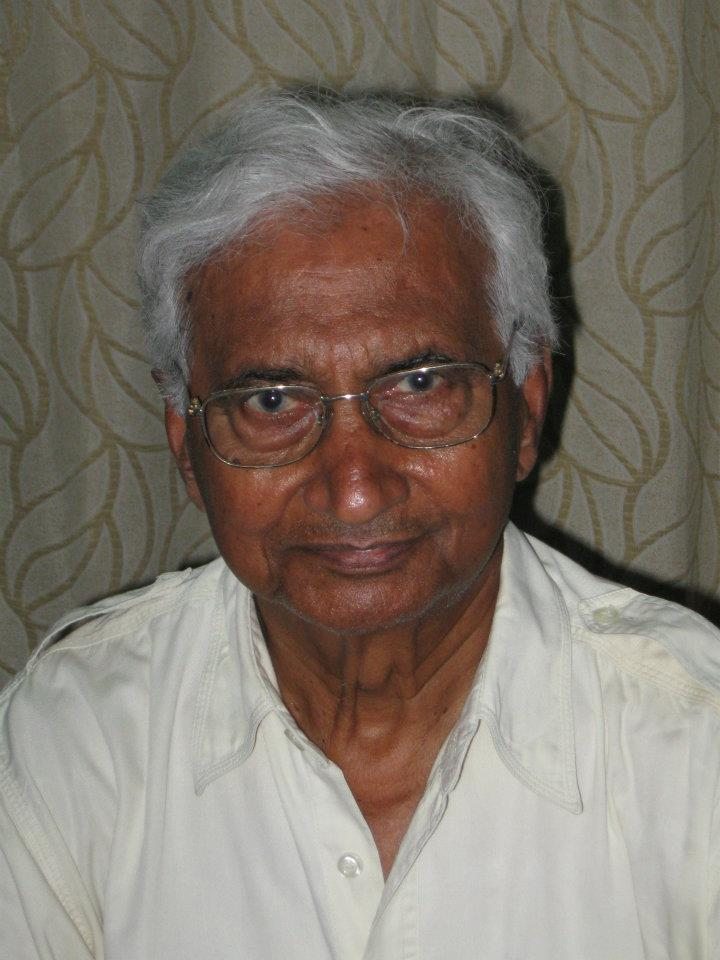
Prof. Dr. Satyabrata Sarkar 2011

Satyabrata Sarkar, (born 1928 in Uttarpara near Calcutta, India), was a scientist, investigating physiological phenomena in plants and then studying the structure and function of plant-pathogenic viruses in the Max-Planck-Institute for Biology in Tübingen and at the University of Hohenheim in Germany. Later on (since 1999) he was teaching Bengali language and literature in the Department of Indology of the University of Tübingen. On 11 December 2022 he died aged 94.

== Education and career ==
Sarkar passed his Matriculation from the Uttarpara Government High School (1944), studied at Ripon College (now known as Surendranath College), Presidency College Calcutta (Bachelor of Science, 1948) and at the University of Calcutta (Master of Science, 1950). He worked on tissue culture of plants and the application of radioisotopes in biological research at the Bose Institute, Calcutta. From 1954 he was engaged in research at the Max Planck Institute for Biology in Tübingen (Departement Georg Melchers) and obtained his Doctorate from the University of Tübingen (1957).

From 1959 he started with intensive studies on the structure and function of plant viruses and obtained his "Habilitation" from the University of Tübingen in 1969. After Habilitation he gave lessons in Virology and Genetics as an associate professor at the same university.

From 1977 to 1995 he was engaged in teaching and research at the University of Hohenheim near Stuttgart. After retirement he started teaching Bengali (since 1999) at the University of Tübingen.

Sarkar was trained in the use of isotopes in Biology at the Nuclear Research Center in Karlsruhe (Germany 1961), in studies on Genetics of Bacteriophages in the Department of Genetics, University of Cologne (1962) and in the structure of ribosomes at an EMBO workshop held in the Max-Planck-Institute for Molecular genetics in Berlin (1970).

== Scientific achievements ==
His studies on the physiological background of the mechanism of flowering of higher plants revealed some interaction between the role of vernalisation (mainly cold treatment) and the direct effect of the plant hormone Gibberellic acid. He used, among others, two lines of Arabidopsis thaliana, a plant, that has proved to be of great significance in modern Molecular Biology of plants. Working with the components of mutants of the tobacco mosaic virus (TMV) he analysed the behaviour of their coat proteins. These findings were the first experimental proof of the "trimer" character of this virus protein (Sarkar, 1960; Caspar, 1963). From a mutant of TMV with a defective coat protein he isolated a rare mutant, which had no coat protein but only the free nucleic acid (RNA). (Ref. 1981). The presence of this free RNA prevented the spread of other related TMV mutants, offering an early experimental proof of the phenomenon, later known as "Gene Silencing". Cellwall-free protoplasts of plant cells (mainly of tobacco and Chinese cabbage) were infected with viruses or with their RNA with a high efficiency and used for physiological investigations. Synergism between potato virus x and potato virus y was studied in vivo by classical methods as well as by ultrastructural, i.e. electronmicroscopic techniques.

== Membership of scientific societies ==
- Indian Science Congress Association, life member
- Indian Phytopathological Society, life member
- Indian Virological Society, fellow
- Deutsche Phytomedizinische Gesellschaft
- Deutsche Virologische Gesellschaft

== Publications ==
- Scientific papers
  - Dutt, M., Sarkar, S. & Dutta, C.T.: Physiological studies on diploid and polyploid varieties of banana. Science and Culture 16, 215,1950
  - Sarkar, S.: Versuche zur Physiologie der Vernalisation. Biol. Zentralblatt 77, 1–49,1958
  - Sarkar, S.: Interaction and mixed aggregation of proteins from tobacco mosaic virus strains. Zeitschr. Naturforschung. 15b,778–786, 1960 (See also Caspar, D.L.D.: Assembly and stability of the tobacco mosaic virus particle. Adv. in Protein Chemistry 18, 37–121, 1963)
  - Sarkar, S.: Relative infectivity of tobacco mosaic virus and its nucleic acid. Virology 20,185–193,1963
  - Sarkar, S.: Assay of infectivity of nucleic acids. In METHODS IN VIROLOGY (Maramorosch and Koprowski eds.) Vol. 2, 607–644, Academic Press, New York, 1967
  - Sarkar, S. & Schilde-Rentschler, L.: Interaction of TMV proteins during electrophoretic separation in polyacrylamide gels. Molec. Gen. Genetics 103, 244–247, 1968
  - Sarkar, S.: Use of protoplasts for plant virus studies. In METHODS IN VIROLOGY (Maramorosch and Koprowski eds.) Vol.6, 435–456, Academic Press, New York, 1977
  - Matthews, R.E.F. & Sarkar, S.: A light-induced structural change in chloroplasts of Chinese cabbage cells infected with turnip yellow mosaic virus. Jour. Gen. Virol. 33, 435–446, 1976
  - Sarkar, S.& Smitamana, P.: A truly coat-protein-free mutant of tobacco mosaic virus. Naturwissenschaften 68, 145–147, 1981
  - Sarkar, S. & Smitamana, P.: A proteinless mutant of tobacco mosaic virus: Evidence against the role of a viral coat protein for interference. Molec. Gen. Genetics 184, 158–159, 1981
  - Blessing, J. & Sarkar, S.: Isolierung und morphologische Charakterisierung des Kartoffelblattrollvirus (PLRV). Zeirschr. Naturforschung 36c,884–887, 1981
  - Mayee, C.D. & Sarkar, S.: The ultrastructure of Nicotiana tabacum cells infected with potato virus X and potato virus Y. Jour. Ultrastructure Res. 81, 124–131, 1982
  - Sarkar, S.: A simple cage for a controlled transmission of plant viruses by aphids. Zeitschr. Pfl.-Krankh. U. Pfl.-schutz 89,612–615,1982
  - Sarkar, S.: Tobacco mosaic virus: Mutants and strains. In THE PLANT VIRUSES (M.H.V.van Regenmortel and H. Fraenkel-Conrat eds.) Vol.2, 59–77, Plenum Publ. Corp., New York & London, 1986
  - Gerber, M. & Sarkar, S.: The coat protein of tobacco mosaic virus does not play a significant role for cross-protection. Jour. Phytopathol. 124, 323–331, 1989
  - Osbourn, J.K., Sarkar, S. & Wilson, T.M.A.: Complementation of coat protein-defective mutants in transgenic tobacco plants expressing TMV coat protein. Virology 179, 921–925, 1990
- Books
  - Satyabrata Sarkar: Ich lerne Bengalisch, Teil 1. Verlag Grauer; Beuren, Stuttgart, 2002. ISBN 3-86186-403-7; Teil 2. Ibid. ISBN 3-86186-480-0
  - Satyabrata Sarkar: German Prabesika (German learner). Ananda Publishers Private Ltd., Calcutta, 2011. ISBN 978-93-5040-038-8
  - Sarkar, S.: (translator). Die Sonne des Tages. Poems of Rabindranath Tagore. About one hundred poems translated from Bengali to German. Knirsch-Verlag Kirchentellinsfurt, Germany. 2012. ISBN 978-3-927091-89-4
