= Werner Doppler =

Werner Doppler (born December 15, 1941, in Oberlustadt, Germany (today Lustadt) is an Agricultural Economist. His areas of teaching and research have been Farming Systems, Rural Development and Socioeconomics in the Tropics and Subtropics. He was Dean of Faculty at the University of Hohenheim.

== Life and professional career ==
As son of a farmer and wine producer, Werner Doppler managed the family farm on his own for some years. After this he studied agriculture and economics at the universities of Hohenheim and Kiel in Germany. He did his PhD in economics under the guidance of Günther Weinschenck in 1974 in the field of Application of recursive linear mathematical models to analyze and predict regional development in the agricultural sector. He then joined the research team of Hans-Hartwig Ruthenberg as research scientist dealing with the development in the Tropics and Sub Tropics. In this period he spent research semesters at the University of Bradford/England and at the International Rice Research Institute (IRRI) in the Philippines. This period ended with the “Habilitation”, the German assessment for the qualification of a university professorship. From 1979 to 1981 he joined the University of Nairobi/ Kenya as associate professor until he got the position of professor at the University of Hohenheim, Germany in the field of farm management in the tropics and sub tropics.

Werner Doppler married Dorothea Frank in 1970. They have two sons, Fabian and Leander, and a daughter Adriane.

== Lectures and academic training ==
The main focus in teaching was the application of quantitative socioeconomic methods and holistic approaches in farming and rural development in developing countries. Werner Doppler gave lectures in Master’s and PhD programs at the universities of Hohenheim, Karlsruhe and Heidelberg/Germany and at the University of Nairobi/Kenya, University of Florence/Italy, Universities of Amman/Jordan, Bradford/U.K., Thai Nguyen and Hanoi/Vietnam as well as in the Lutheran University in Palmas/Brazil.

At the European Union level, Werner Doppler was involved in internationalizing the postgraduate university programs in accordance with the guidelines of the Bologna Process. During his time as Dean of Faculty at the University of Hohenheim he was responsible for the decisions, preparations and introduction of the international concept of BSc./MSc curricula and the European academic transfer system in 1997 as well as for the introduction of the first formalized international PhD program for students from developing countries in 1991. While he was director of the International PhD program in Hohenheim, funded by the German Academic Exchange Service (DAAD), 104 students from 33 different overseas countries finished their PhD degree. Under his direct supervision 57 from 25 countries did their PhD research.

== Research ==
- From a descriptive-analytical farming systems approach to quantitative, spatial future modeling

In farming systems research, Werner Doppler combines the descriptive and comparative approach represented by Hans-Hartwig Ruthenberg, who explains the development process by analyzing the past, with quantitative methods in agriculture and economic research (e.g. Earl O. Heady, R.H. Day, and G. Weinschenck). As a result, quantitative, systems models for simulating future rural development are available which allow measuring the impact of future strategies in development projects and developing countries.

In a further step, space in rural areas has become another dimension through information provided by integrating remote sensing in the methodological concept. With this, Geographical Information Systems (GIS) can be applied and the economic models for future development extended to comprehensive spatial rural development models, which allow a high degree of internalization of problems, processes and decisions.

- From farm management to living standards of families and decision-making in rural societies

The application of classical farm management in developing countries is expanded by social, ecological and cultural influences in decision-making of families with similar consequences in the evaluation of development strategies. Werner Doppler considers living standard of families as central at the micro level and defines it with economic, food and health related, social and dependency-on-resource-owner and risk criteria. At the level of the society in a rural area, rural welfare is applied and defined as the sum of the living standard of all social groups in the region plus ecological, social and cultural aspects considered relevant from a societal point of view. Socioeconomic analyses and assessments of future strategies may show different results at the micro or societal level and indicate conflicts which can be seen in ecological misuse of resources.

The relationship between family and society also shows a vertical link in decision-making and dependencies and may function as “bottom-up” or “top-down” between families, communes, ethnic groups, projects, markets, regional administration and even the national level. This is especially relevant for availability, use and prices/costs of land, water, labor, capital, social network and social security as well as skills and knowledge.

With all these extensions in at various levels of the methodology Werner Doppler aims at a holistic approach in analyzing the past and the present and forecasting the future, to better meet real life conditions of people and give more practical relevance to the quantification and assessment of impacts of future strategies.

- The application of the concepts in developing countries

The empirical research of Werner Doppler was exclusively related to developing countries. The research focus was on the impact of future problem-solving strategies on the living standard of families and rural welfare in the following fields:

- Developing and sustainable use of water resources, organization and management of water distribution amongst user and water pricing policies (Middle East, Nepal/India, Southeast Asia)
- Strategies to combat and prevent unsustainable use of land, desertification and erosion/land sliding in mountain zones (West and East Africa, Middle East, Southeast Asia)
- Alternatives to deforestation and alternative energies (Southeast Asia, Brazil) and potentialities of regional development in remote mountain farming (Himalaya, Southeast Asia)
- Environmentally sound, integrated livestock systems at a high standard of animal health in family farms with limited resources and deficits in food security (West Africa)
- Rural income generation in family farms through storage, processing and marketing of agricultural products and the role of women (Africa)
- Sustainable farming and land use systems at the forest margins of the tropical rainforest (Brazil) and the protection and support of indigenous people (Hill tribes Asia, ethnic groups Amazon area)
- Limits and potentials of spatial infrastructure (transport, electricity, health care, schools, banks and money lending, public service) in developing rural areas (Southeast Asia, Brazil)

In all research programs, the issues of food security, mobility and human migration, the regional administrative capacity as well as regulations in ownership/renting and hiring rights, regulations in market infrastructure and social services and the cultural framework have been elements in the concepts and their evaluation.

The research programs have been carried out in cooperation with seven international research centers of the Consultative Group on International Agricultural Research (CGIAR) and with 26 universities in Africa, Asia and Latin America.

== Publications ==
The research team of Werner Doppler published 25 books and 210 reviewed articles. The book on “Tropical Farming Systems Economics” published in 2013 summarizes research programs and outcome. Werner Doppler is also founder and co-editor of the series ”Farming and Rural Systems Economics”. There are 291 presentations at international conferences and workshops.

Selected books:

- Doppler, W. (2013): Tropical Farming Systems Economics. ISBN 978-3-8236-1654-2
- Doppler, W. et al (2006): Water resources development and its impact on rural livelihood in Northern Thailand - Integrating GIS into farming systems economics. ISBN 978-3-8236-1568-2
- Doppler, W. et al (2005): Resources and livelihood in mountain areas of South East Asia. Farming and rural systems in a changing environment, 2005, ISBN 3-8236-1484-3
- Doppler, W. (1992): Landwirtschaftliche Betriebssysteme in den Tropen und Subtropen. ISBN 3-8001-4084-5
- Doppler, W. (1985): Planung, Evaluierung und Management von Entwicklungsprojekten. ISBN 3-922553-52-4; also published in Vietnamese language (2008) under ISBN 978-3-8236-1516-3 and in Arabic language (2010) under ISBN 978-3-8236-1581-1

Selected online publications:

- Bioenergy and sustainable development: The dilemma of food security and climate change in the Brazilian savannah
- The impact of water price strategies on the allocation of irrigation water: the case of the Jordan Valley
- Towards a general guideline of irrigation water charging policy
- Werner Doppler on Ascidatabase
- Problems and Potentials of Organic Agriculture Development in Nepal, University of Hohenheim 2008
- Smallholder Peri-Urban Organic Farming in Nepal: A Comparative Analysis of Farming Systems
- Rural and Farming Systems Analyses Environmental Perspectives 1998
- Potentials of Organic Agriculture in Nepal
- Energy for Sustainable Development
- The Future Impact of Adoption of Soil Conservation Strategy at Family level in the Highlands of Ethiopia
- Combining principal component analysis and logistic regression models to assess household level food security among smallholder cash crop producers in Kenya
- Socio-economic Determinants of Household Fertilizer Use Intensity for Maize-based Production Systems in the Northern Guinea Savannah of Nigeria
- Land Use and Household Economy in H´mong Mountainous Farming Systems in Vietnam -- the Case of Mai Son District

== Consultancies ==
Werner Doppler was consultancy adviser to several institutions such as World Bank, Kreditanstalt für Wiederaufbau (KfW), Food and Agricultural Organization (FAO), European Commission and Gesellschaft für Internationale Zuammenarbeit (GIZ, formerly GTZ) and various ministries in Thailand and the Philippines. In total 42 consultancies have been carried out. The following is a representative selection of them:

- Project finding missions in Nuba Mountains, Kordofan and Aweil, Sudan (1975), Rural development in settlement schemes of the Khuan Pumiphol projects in Thailand (1986), rural development in the Departmento San Pedro Norte, Paraguay (1987), evaluation of “Tangail Rural Development Project, Bangladesh (1988)
- Evaluation of Masri and Cap-Bon irrigation project, Tunisia (1976), microeconomic implications of Bou Heurtma irrigation project, Tunisia (1978), Development planning of Mahaweli Ganga irrigation project, Sri Lanka (1979)
- Risk reduction in smallholdings through locust control, Madagascar (1984), Improvement of the crop protection service in Madagascar (1986), Project proposal to Biological oriented crop protection in the Philippines (1986), Improvement of veterinary field services, artificial insemination and animal production in the Ghab (1982), Syria, Veterinary epidemiology in Central Rangeland of Somalia (1986), Improvement of the efficiency of animal disease control in Colombia (1985), Milk production, processing marketing and quality assessment in Myanmar (1988)
- Training and research at Savar Station, Bangladesh (1977), Research concepts for Avetonou research Station, Togo (1978), improvement of veterinary research at Hama Veterinary Faculty, Syria (1982), evaluation of research programs at Egerton University, Kenya (1989), Evaluating Arab Center for the Studies of Arid Zones and Dry Lands (1995), Designing new faculties at university in Trujillo, Peru (2005)

== National and international mandates ==
- Director of the International PhD program at Hohenheim University
- Member in several committees of The German Academic Exchange Service (DAAD) and of the German Agricultural Society (DLG)
- Representative in the German Rectors Conference
- External Examiner in various universities in the tropics and subtropics, such as University of Serdang/Malaysia or at the Asian Institute of Technology (AIT)/Thailand
- Member in various committees in European Union related to Internationalization of academic programs and Peer Review Panel for research funding of the European Union
- President of the European group of the International Association on Farming Systems Research and Extension( IFSA) and member of the Board of Director of the respective world organization
- Member of the Board of Directors and vice president of the Network of European Agricultural Tropically and Subtropically oriented Universities and Scientific Complexes related with Agricultural Development (NATURA)

== Literature ==
- Werner Doppler in: Fellmeth, U. und K. Quast: Die akademischen Lehrer an der Universität Hohenheim 1968 - 2005), Stuttgart 2008 (Hohenheimer Themen, Sonderband, 15./16. Jg.) (ISSN 0942-5209), Seite 95 f
- Chinedum Nwajiuba (2013): International impacts of thirty years academic teaching and training. In: Tropical Farming Systems Economics“ (ISBN 978-3-8236-1654-2), Seite 61 bis 68
- Rosemary Otieno (2013): The impact of systems research in PhD programmes on development. In Tropical Farming Systems Economics“ (ISBN 978-3-8236-1654-2), Seite 68 bis 72
- Luigi Omodei Zorini (2013): Impacts of Werner Doppler. In: In Tropical Farming Systems Economics“ (ISBN 978-3-8236-1654-2), Seite 188 bis 193
