= Volker Roemheld =

German agroscientist (1941–2013)

Volker Roemheld (born 22 November 1941 in Schwaig near Nuremberg, died 27 November 2013 in Stuttgart) was a German agricultural scientist, plant physiologist and soil biologist at Hohenheim University.

== Biography ==
After attending school Volker Rhoemheld studied chemical engineering at the Ohm Polytechnic in Nuremberg, followed by an appointment in the pharmaceutical firm Dr. R. Pfleger Chemie in Bamberg (1960-1964). He then absolved an apprenticeship in gardening in Kassel (assistant’s examination 1966) and went on to study horticulture at Technische Universität Berlin (1966-1970). He won a stipendium from the German National Academy and visited Leeds University to work in the Institute of Botany under Prof. H.W. Woolhouse on the theme: Iron uptake by various chlorosis-resistant ecotypes. After his return in 1972 he became a Scientific Assistant at the Institute for Plant Nutrition at the Technische Universität Berlin, continued his research and obtained a Dr. sc. agr. degree in 1979 with a dissertation: Mechanisms of Uptake and Storage of Iron Chelates by higher plants. In 1979 he started as Scientific Assistant at the Institute for Plant Nutrition at University of Hohenheim. In 1988 he qualified as Lecturer in Plant Nutrition and in 1992 became Professor. From 1996 he was also Visiting Professor at China Agricultural University, Beijing, China. He retired in 2006.

== Research focus ==
Function, uptake and fertilization of micronutrients, genotypical differences in nutrient preference (in particular P and micronutrients); significance of Bioeffectors and rhizosphere processes on nutrient preference and plant health; plant nutrition in ecological agriculture; plant nutrition in the tropics and sub-tropics; ecological aspects of fertilization (nitrogen, heavy metals); phytoremediation; recycling of agricultural and industrial waste products; scientific cooperations with England, Hungary, Israel, USA, Canada, Japan, China, Brasil, Thailand and New Zealand.

== Publications ==
Roemheld was involved in ca. 300 publications, mostly in international scientific journals.

== Membership and honorary positions ==
- German Society of Plant Nutrition (DPG)
- German Society of Agriculture (DBG)
- Society of Experimental Botany (SEB)
- American Society of Plant Physiology
- American Society of Agronomy
- American Society of Soil Sciences
- American Society of Crop Sciences

== Editorial boards ==
- J. Plant Nutrition
- Bio Metals
- Plant and Soil
- Biology and Fertility of Soils

Regular referee for the following journals:

- Plant Physiology
- New Phytologist
- J. Plant Nutr. Soil Sciences
- J. Exp. Botany
- Scientia Horticulturae
- Vitis
- J. Plant Physiology
