= Juergen Zeddies =

German-born agricultural economist and advisor

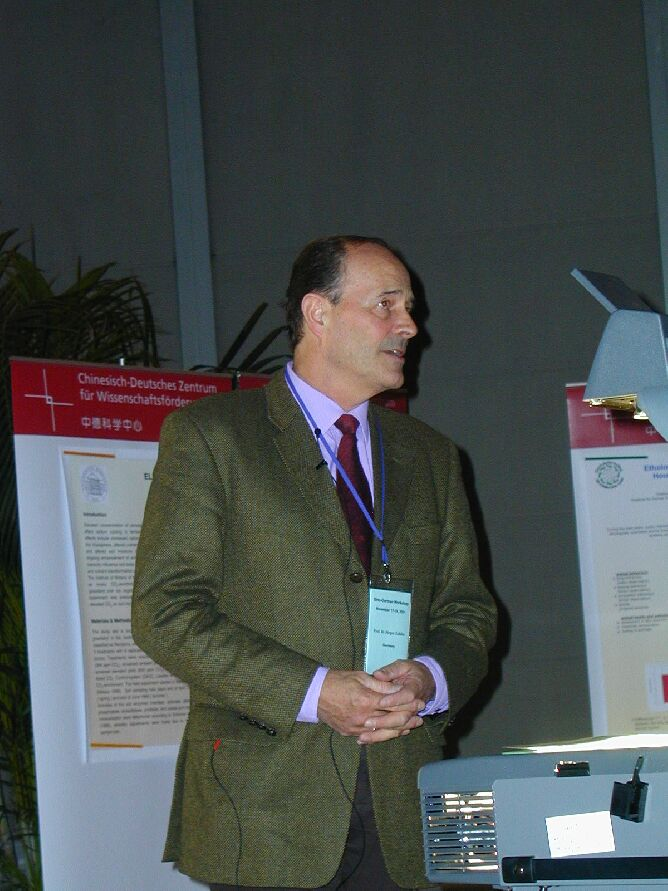
Jürgen Zeddies

Juergen Zeddies (born 28 June 1942 in Hameln) is a German agricultural economist, Emeritus of the University of Hohenheim and an advisor to German and international governments and research organisations.

== Life and work ==
In the summer term of 1974 he became stand-in professor for Wilhelm Brandes and in October of the same year was appointed Professor of Agricultural Management at the University of Hohenheim, where he remained until 2008. Zeddies received a number of commissions from national and state ministries, for example to draw up plans for milk quotas, set-aside of land, direct payments to agriculture (together with A. Henze) and for the EU Commission to plan reforms of the sugar market regulations (together with Wilhelm Henrichsmeyer).

Zeddies was a regular advisor of the Federal Ministry for Agricultural Cooperation and the Gesellschaft für Internationale Zusammenarbeit (Society for International Cooperation) in the economic aspects of plant protection (in Jemen, Nigeria, Philippines, Tonga, Samoa, Morocco among other countries), improved seed supply (Nepal, Sri Lanka, Morocco and others) and new production methods through technical innovation (Azoren, Philippines, Egypt, Benin and others).

Zeddies was the first foreigner to be commissioned by the Chinese Government (in 1986 in cooperation with Erwin Reisch and W. Grosskopf) to carry out a study on land reform which was put into practice only a few years later. After the dissolution of the "Eastern Bloc" he used EU projects to build up the Hohenheim network. Scientists from Poland, Romania, Ukraine, Lithuania, Russia, Uzbekistan, Armenia and Georgia were educated in Hohenheim and their home institutes were supplied with internet services, computers and textbooks.

For nine years, Zeddies was the spokesman for a specialist research area of the Deutschen Forschungsgemeinschaft (German Research Foundation) and for ten years he was head of a graduate college of the German Research Society. For six years he was a member of the Central Committee and Senate of the same organisation. He was a member of the Scientific Board of the Federal Ministry of Agriculture and Forestry and the Advisory Board on Sustainability of Baden-Wuerttemberg State.

== Awards ==
- Gold Medal of the State of Baden-Wuerttemberg (1995)
- Honorary Doctorate of the Moscow Universities (Timirjasew-Akademie 1996) and Timișoara (Romania 1999)
- Honorary Professor in South Korea (Suwon 1997) und Uzbekistan (Samarkand 2002)
- Badge of Honour of the University of Hohenheim (2008)
- Bundesverdienstkreuz am Bande (Federal Cross of Merit) of the German Federation (2008)
- Theodor-Brinkmann-Prize of Bonn University (2009)
