= International Biocontrol Manufacturers' Association =

- Abbreviation: IBMA
- Formation: 1995
- Type: International Association
- Purpose: Manufacturers' Union for products of Biocontrol in crops
- Location: Brussels
- Region served: Worldwide
- President / Executive Director: Herman Van Mallaert / Jennifer Lewis
- Website: www.ibma-global.org

The International Biocontrol Manufacturers' Association (IBMA) is a worldwide association of the biocontrol industry, with its head office in Brussels. IBMA has over 220 member companies.

The association sponsors the Annual Biocontrol Industry Meeting held in Basel, Switzerland.

== History ==
In 1995, the IBMA was founded in Brighton (England), whose founding president was Bernard Blum. In his honour the Bernard Blum Award was launched in 2015.

The IBMA presidents have been: Michel Guillon, Denise Munday, Owen Jones, Willem Ravensberg and Sylvia Plak. Current IBMA Global President is Herman Van Mellaert.

== Scope ==
The association sees itself representing the manufacturers of biocontrol products mainly within the European Union, the OECD, and FAO.

In workshops, the experiences of the members is to be exchanged, in particular at the annual ABIM Congress in Basel.

In contrast to the chemical crop protection industry (Agricultural Industry Association) the IBMA members produce Bioeffectors, i.e. botanicals, pheromones, invertebrate biocontrol agents and micro-organisms as a basis for plant protection products. These biocontrol products against plant diseases and pests can be used in the organic production of food as well as in IPM production systems.

A large percentage of IBMA members are Small, Medium Enterprises (SMEs). IBMA Members’ Biocontrol products are used in conventional farming systems in integrated pest management (IPM) when intervention is required.

IBMA is a member of BioProtection Global, a worldwide federation of biocontrol and biopesticides industry associations.

== See also ==
- Biological pest control
