= Uwe Ludewig =

German agricultural scientist (born 1967)

Uwe Ludewig (born 26 June 1967 in Helmstedt) is a German agricultural scientist specializing in plant physiology. He is director of the Institute for Crop Science at the University of Hohenheim.

== Biography ==
Ludewig was born in Helmstedt in Lower Saxony of Germany. After school in Braunschweig, Ludewig studied physics, particularly biophysics, at the Technical University of Braunschweig in the same city. He then studied at the University of Göttingen, where he completed his studies with a Diploma at the Max Planck Institute for Biophysical Chemistry in the Department of Membrane Physics.

Ludewig then conducted postgraduate study at the Center for Molecular Neurobiology Hamburg of the University of Hamburg and obtained his Doctorate (Dr. rer. nat.) in 1996 with a thesis on The Structure and Function of Chloride Canals under Thomas Jentsch. After working abroad on an EMBO Postdoc Stipendium at University of Seville in Spain under Prof. Jose Lopez-Barneo before he moved to University of Tuebingen to work with Prof. Wolf Frommer.

In 2002 Ludewig became a Junior Group Leader at the Centre for Plant Molecular Biology in Tuebingen, obtained his professorship in 2007 and the venia legendi for plant physiology. In 2009 – 2010 he took over as a stand-in professor at the Technical University of Darmstadt. He was then appointed Professor of Nutrition Physiology of Horticultural Crops at the University of Hohenheim. He has been managing director of the Institute for Horticultural Crop Science (Institut für Kulturpflanzenwissenschaften) since it was given this new name.

== Membership and involvement ==
- German Society of Plant Nutrition (Deutsche Gesellschaft für Pflanzenernährung), (German Society for Plant Nutrition)
- German Society for Plant Sciences (Deutsche Botanische Gesellschaft)

== Field of Interest and Publications ==
Ludewig teaches and researches in molecular plant nutrition. His research area is concerned with the genetic and molecular basis of the uptake and distribution of nutrients by plants. His major interest is the uptake, perception and regulation of the ammonium transport system, nitrogen and phosphorus use in culture plants, and the special role of individual micro-nutrients. Since the year 2000 the institute has been involved in five EU-financed projects and employs undergraduates and doctoral students from more than ten countries.

Ludewig is in demand as a speaker at congresses and is a member of the executive committee of Biofector; He has more than 50 publications together with his colleagues.
