= Annual Biocontrol Industry Meeting =

The Annual Biocontrol Industry Meeting (ABIM) in Basel is an annual conference of manufacturers of biological plant protection products worldwide. Every year since 2005, 700 – 800 delegates from 300 – 400 firms take part in this English-speaking meeting.

The goal of the conference is the exchange of business and scientific experience and presentation of commercial and scientific advances on the subject of the protection of plants and pest control in plant crops by natural (biological) methods, with particular reference to Bioeffectors.

The meeting takes place every autumn in Basel, and is organised by the Swiss Research Institute for Biological Agriculture (FiBL). In parallel the annual meeting of the International Biocontrol Manufacturers' Association (IBMA), the association representing the biological plant protection industry, is held.

Important sponsors of the meeting are Andermatt Group, BASF, Bayer, Biobest, Biogard, De Sangosse, Koppert, Monsanto Bio AG, Oro Agri, Sumitomo, Syngenta, Vallent Biosciences.
