= Manfred G. Raupp =

German agricultural scientist and economist

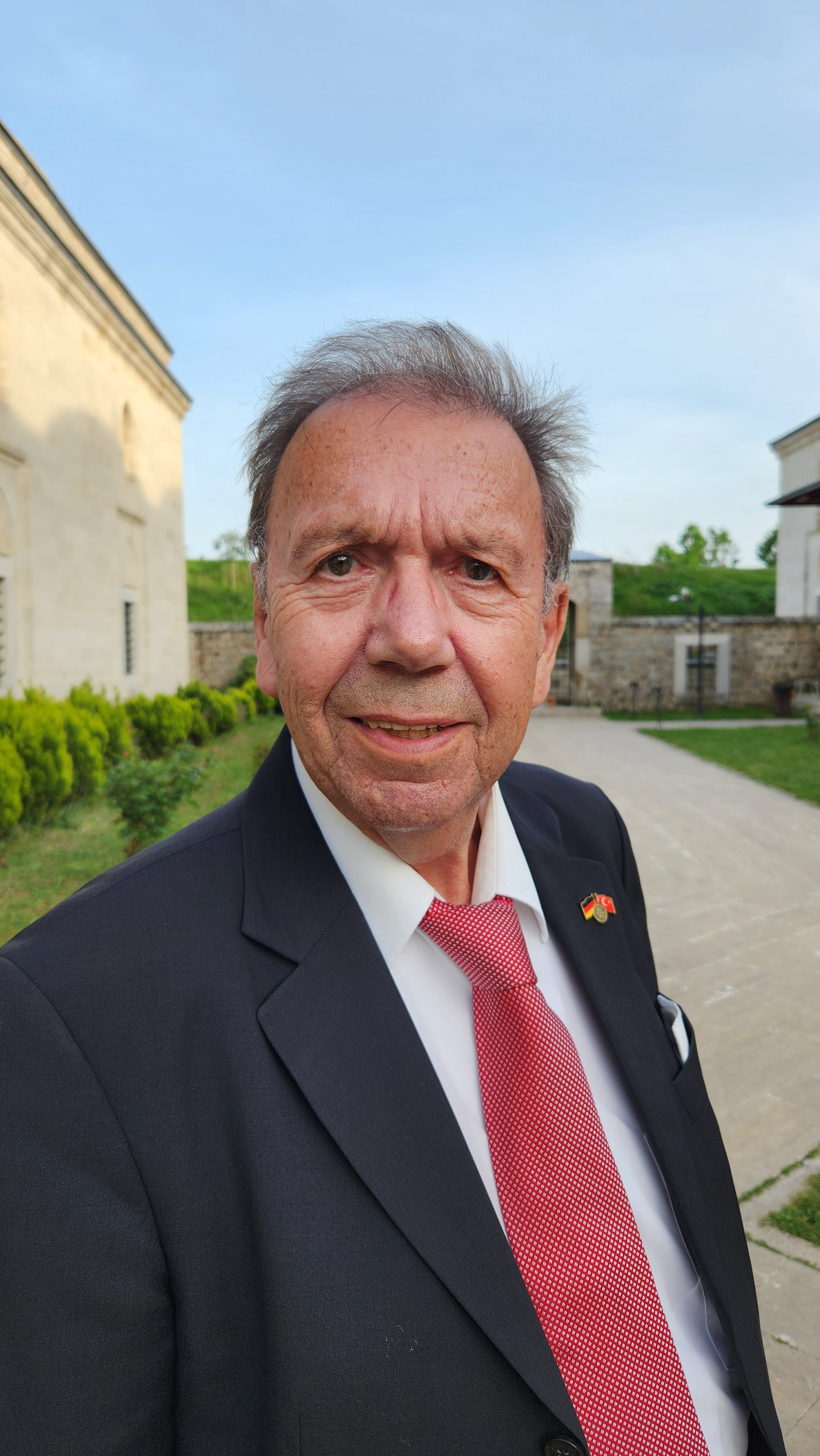
- Manfred G. Raupp in 2024
- Born: Manfred Gustav Raupp; 13 November 1941 (age 84); Staffort

Manfred Gustav Raupp (born 13 November 1941) is a German agricultural scientist and economist. He serves as an honorary professor at the Czech University of Life Sciences Prague, where he is actively involved in the Department of Agricultural Research and International Management. Additionally, Raupp is a key member of the management team for the EU research project Biofector, specializing in agricultural and biological informatics. In this role, he is responsible for overseeing training and dissemination of information.

== Life and work ==
Raupp was born in Staffort, a suburb of Stutensee. After completing his studies in agricultural technology, agricultural science, sociology, economics, and marketing at the Engineering College in Nuertingen, the University of Hohenheim and at INSEAD, Raupp specialized in market theory at Hohenheim and Bad Duerkheim. He earned engineering (FH) and agriculture diplomas, and obtained his doctorate (Dr. oec) in 1973 at Hohenheim.

From 1974 to 1999, Raupp held a senior management position at the Swiss conglomerate Ciba-Geigy, where he was responsible for seed products. Following the merger that formed Novartis, he oversaw the agrochemical business in Central and Eastern Europe, as well as Central Asia. Since 1999, he has operated an independent business focusing on agricultural research and consulting.

Raupp serves as a registered EU advisor to the European Commission on agro-research issues, particularly concerning Bio-Effectors. He also teaches at the Universities of Prague-Suchdol, Chester, Erdine, and Timişoara, conducting research and lecturing on plant vitalization, resource management, Bio-Effectors, the natural product industry, plant disease resistance, and international management.

== Further commitments ==
In the 1970s, he co-founded the Renewable Raw Materials group under Manfred Dambroth, contributing significantly to the establishment of the German Gene Bank for Crop Plants. Alongside Ludwig Reiner, he played a pivotal role in the founding of agricultural informatics in Germany.

In 1987, Raupp was instrumental in providing support to Polish small farmers by supplying blizzard-resistant maize seeds. By 1989, he was invited to the University of Prague-Suchdol to lecture on Agricultural Research and International Management in both German and English. In 2000, he joined the editorial board of the scientific journal, Scientia Agriculturae Bohemica, based in Prague.

Since the inception of the Erasmus program, Raupp has been actively involved in international student exchanges, contributing to both the Rotarian youth exchange and serving on the Regional Committee Germany-Turkey of Rotary International.

He serves as a Guest Lecturer within the Erasmus partnerships between Trakya University, the University of Chester, and DHBW Loerrach. In collaboration with Mukadder Seyhan Yuecel, he organized the Loerrach Symposium at Trakya University. He also advocated for the inclusion of the Selimiye Mosque on the UNESCO World Cultural Heritage list.

Manfred Raupp was the founding chairman of Loerrach International since its inception in 2004. Under his leadership, the organization aimed to nurture city partnerships and friendships. During his tenure, Manfred Raupp was recognized for his significant contributions to making the city partnerships "extraordinarily lively." He was honored as the driving force behind the organization, often referred to as the "engine" of Loerrach International. In 2015, Raupp was named an honorary citizen of Edirne, Turkey, one of Lörrach's partner cities, acknowledging his efforts and contributions towards international friendship and cooperation.

Raupp was also a founding member of the German BioValley, and the trinational School Research Centre phaenovum.

== Selected publications ==
- Macharzina, Klaus & Michael-Jörg Oesterle (Editors) Handbook of International Management; Contribution Manfred G. Raupp, Management-related and Organisational Requirements of Export Strategy, Hohenheim University; (Gabler 1997/2002), ISBN 3-409-12184-6.
- Leadership, Persuasion and Sales; a Basis for Study and Everyday Life. Frieling and Partner Publishing Berlin 2003 ISBN 3-8280-1918-8
- BW Cooperative State University; an innovative system of higher education; Balkan Conference Edirne 2010
- Family History Book of Staffort, Published by the town of Stutensee, Verlag Gesowip Basel 2010, ISBN 978-3-906129-64-8
- Loerrach Symposium; 5 Years of College and Culture Partnership Loerrach-Erdine, Loerrach 2011 ISBN 978-3-942298-02-5
- Enver Duran; Professor of Medicine and Reetor of Trakya University 2004–2012, Lörrach 2012 ISBN 978-3-9815406-0-4
- Together with Mukadder Seyhan Yücel: The Key of Success in Business and Personal Development is Language Competence, Loerrach 2012 ISBN 978-3-9815406-1-1
- Together with Bärbel Bouziane: Lörrach and the Elysee Friendship, Lörrach 2013 ISBN 978-3-9815406-3-5
- Together with Peter Lepkojis: The German-Turkish Care Project Lörrach-Edirne; Information for German-Turkish Exchange of Carers, Loerrach 2013 ISBN 978-3-9815406-4-2
- Zur Entwicklung der Agrarforschung im Laufe der Zeit, Überlegungen im Zusammenhang mit dem Einsatz von Bioeffektoren, Lörrach, ISBN 978-3-945046-07-4
- Zum früheren Tabakanbau der Hardt und seiner historischen Einordnung; Eine Darstellung der regionalen und weltweiten Bedeutung, Stutensee, September 2016 ISBN 978-3-945046-08-1
- Zu den Innovationen im landwirtschaftlichen Pflanzenbau und Aspekte für die menschliche Ernährung gestern, heute und morgen, Lörrach, August 2016 ISBN 978-3-945046-06-7
- Together with Peter Hartman: Agrarlexikon mit den wichtigsten Begriffen zur Landwirtschaft im Europäischen Umfeld; Bedeutung in deutscher und englischer Sprache erklärt. ISBN 978-3-945046-09-8
- The fight against Malaria and Other related Mosquito-born Diseases, University Prishtina, Rotary International Workshop Mai 2019 ISBN 978-3-945046-16-6
- Biofector Research Document, The Use of Bio-Effectors for Crop Nutrition, March 2020 ISBN 978-3-945046-10-4
- Biofector Herbarium Raupp, April 2020 ISBN 978-3-945046-18-0
- Leon F. Raupp, Manfred G. Raupp (HG): Das Schloss zu Staffort, Druckort des Stafforter Buches. Stutensee und Lörrach 2021, ISBN 978-3-945046-20-3 and Staffort Castle – Site of the printing of the Staffort Book, Lörrach, 2021 ISBN 978-3-945046-24-1
- Holger Müller, Johannes Ehmann, Manfred G. Raupp: Das Stafforter Buch, Baden zwischen Calvin und Luther, J.S. Klotz Verlagshaus Neulingen 2021, ISBN 978-3-948968-55-7; English version: The Staffort Book, Baden between Calvin and Luther, Klotz Verlagshaus Neulingen 2022, ISBN 978-3-949763-04-5; online version Staffort Book als PDF-Version.
- Markus Weinmann et. all. Manfred G. Raupp (HG): Banat Green Deal; GreenERDE; Agriculture in Responsibility for our Common World, Education and Research in the context of the digital and ecological transformation of agriculture in the Banat Region and Baden-Württemberg - towards resource efficiency and resilience, Lörrach 2022 ISBN 978-3-945046-25-8.

== Awards ==
- Honorary Professor of the Czech University of Prague 2003
- Paul Harris Fellow Medaille of Rotary International 2011
- Appointment as Guest Professor of Chester University 2012
- Honorary Citizen of Edirne 2015
