= Torsten Müller =

Torsten Müller (born 12 July 1961 in Kassel, West Germany) is an agricultural scientist at the University of Hohenheim. He is chairman of the examination and admissions board of the European master's degree Course "Organic Agriculture and Food Systems" and Dean of Education of the Agricultural Science Faculty in Hohenheim.

== Biography ==
After attending school in Kassel he passed a practical examination in agriculture. He studied Agricultural Science at the George-August University in Goettingen, Germany, and passed the appropriate examinations in 1983, followed an Agricultural Engineering Diploma in 1986 and a Ph. D. (Doctor of Agricultural Science) in 1992.

He then undertook studies on "European Expert in Environmental Conservation" at the Environmental Protection Service in Muenster, Germany, and became Assistant and Associate Professor for plant nutrition and soil health at the Faculty of Agricultural Science at The Royal Veterinary and Agricultural University, Frederiksberg (Copenhagen) (today the Faculty of Life Science) from 1993 to 2000.

C Habilitation with Venia Legendi for Plant Nutrition and Soil Science, Kassel University, 2004.

There followed an appointment as Professor of Fertilization and Soil Matter Dynamics (Former Fertilization with Soil Chemistry)in the Institute of Plant Nutrition (today Institute of Horticultural Science) at Hohenheim University.

== Memberships and Affiliations ==
- German Society for Plant Nutrition
- German Agricultural Society
- Federal Earth Society
- Danish Soil Science Society (Dansk Forening for Jordbundsvidenskab, DFJ)
- International Union of Soil Sciences (IUSS)
- International Fertiliser Society (IFS)
- International Society of Organic Agriculture Research (ISOFAR)
- Gesellschaft zur wissenschaftlichen Untersuchung von Parawissenschaften (GWUP; "Society for the Investigation of Parasciences")
- Society of German Agricultural Investigation and Research Institute
- International Graduate Council: Modelling of Material Flow and Production Systems for Sustainable Resource Use in Intensive Arable and Vegetable systems In the North Chinese Plains
- Member of the German Life Saving Association; since 1975 voluntary lifeguard, paramedic, trainer and instructor.

== Field of Interest and Publications ==
- Torsten Muellers research projects
- Torsten Muellers publication list
