= Stephan Dabbert =

German agricultural economist (1958–2024)

Stephan Dabbert (23 June 1958 – 1 October 2024) was a German agricultural economist and Rector of the University of Hohenheim.

== Biography ==
Dabbert was born in Braunschweig, Germany on 23 June 1958.

The agricultural economist Stephan Dabbert studied agriculture at Christian-Albrecht University in Kiel, followed by a Master of Science degree in agricultural economics at Pennsylvania State University.

He obtained his doctorate from the University of Hohenheim (Germany) in 1990, as well as his professorship in the area of agricultural business management.

He led the Institute for Social Economy from 1992 until 1994 at the Leibniz Centre for Agricultural Landscape Research in Müncheberg. He held the chair and leadership of the Department of Production Theory and Resource Economics in Hohenheim from 1994 on. From 2000 to 2002 he was Dean of Faculty IV - Agricultural Science II – Agricultural Economics, Agricultural Technology and Livestock Farming at Hohenheim University. From 2002 to 2006 he was Dean of the amalgamated Faculty of Agricultural Science in Hohenheim. He was elected Rector in preference to 13 other candidates by a large majority 2012.

Dabbert died on 1 October 2024, at the age of 66.

== Field of interest and publications ==
Economic questions concerning ecological cultivation were a focus of Prof. Dabbert’s research. A further emphasis lay on interdisciplinary modelling, by means of which agriculture can be represented at the countryside or regional level.

- Researchprojects of Stephan Dabbert
- Publications of Stephan Dabbert
