= University of Hohenheim =

Public university in Stuttgart, Germany

- Universität Hohenheim
- Type: Public
- Established: 1818; 208 years ago
- Budget: € 197.9 million (2024)
- Rector: Christoph Schneider
- Academic staff: 126 (2024)
- Administrative staff: 2,083 (2024)
- Students: 8,768 (2024)
- Location: Stuttgart, Baden-Württemberg, Germany; 48°42′41″N 9°12′34″E
- Colours: Blue
- Website: www.uni-hohenheim.de

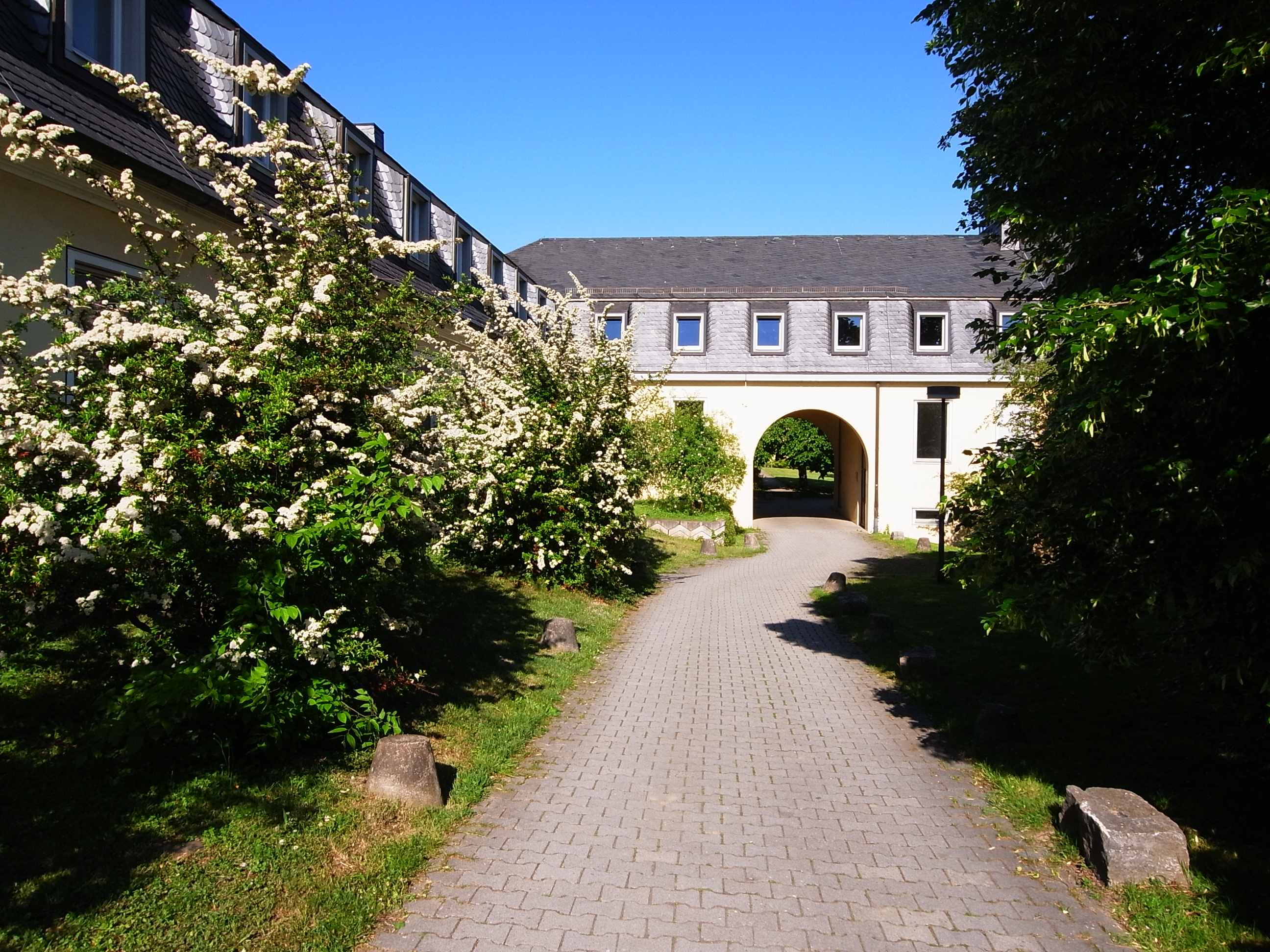
On campus

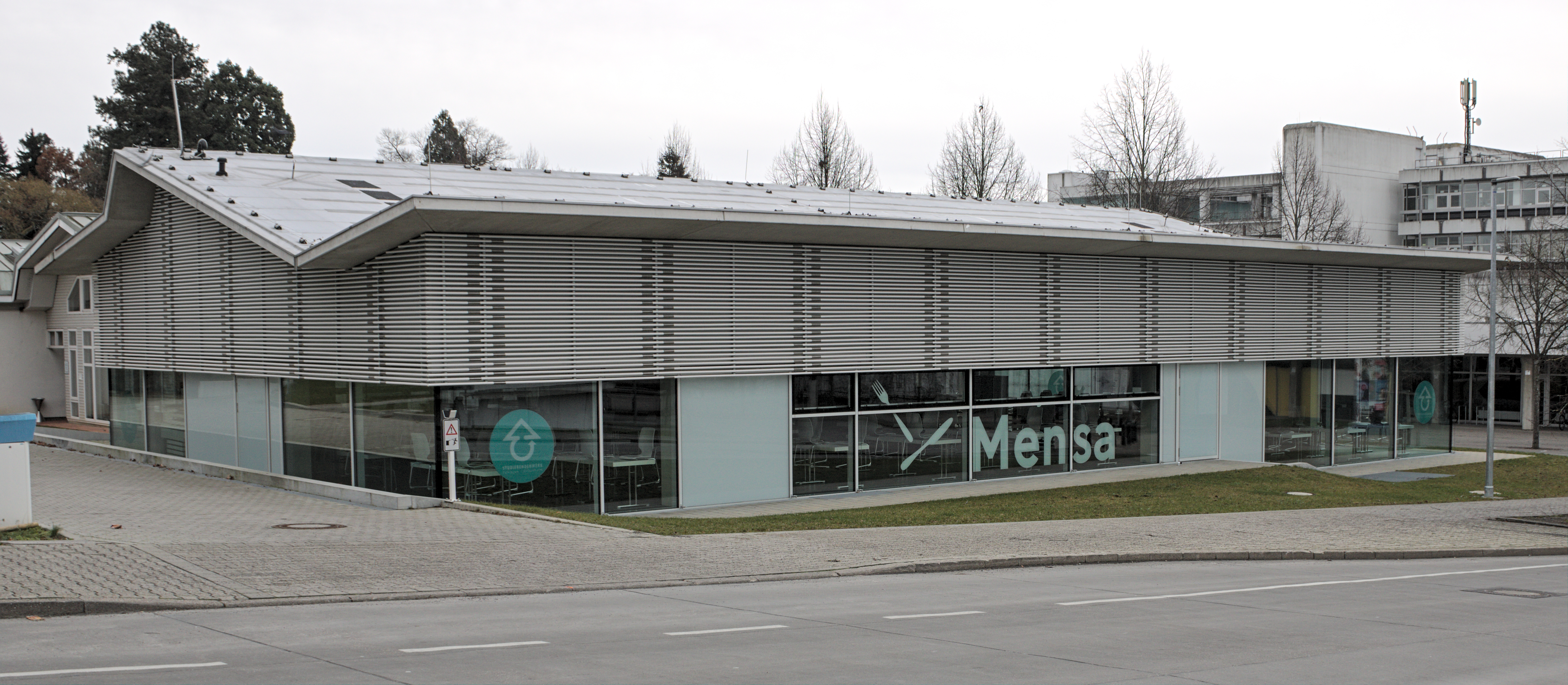
Cafeteria

The University of Hohenheim (German: Universität Hohenheim) is a campus university located in the south of Stuttgart, Germany. Founded in 1818, it is Stuttgart's oldest university. Its primary areas of specialisation had traditionally been agricultural and natural sciences. Today, however, the majority of its students are enrolled in one of the many study programs offered by the faculty of business, economics and social sciences. The faculty has regularly been ranked among the best in the country, making the University of Hohenheim one of Germany's top-tier universities in these fields. The university maintains academic alliances with a number of partner universities and is involved in numerous joint research projects.

== History ==
From 1770 to 1794, the Karlsschule was the only university in Stuttgart. Since its founding in 1818, Stuttgart's oldest university has been the University of Hohenheim. The eruption of the Indonesian volcano Mount Tambora in 1815 triggered a global climate change and was one of the causes of the massive famine suffered in the Kingdom of Württemberg at the beginning of the 19th century. In 1818 King William I of Württemberg set up an Agricultural Academy in Hohenheim to radically improve general nutrition in the kingdom through teaching, experimentation and demonstration and, in so doing, laid the foundation for the University of Hohenheim. At that time, there were 18 students enrolled and a staff of three professors. It is not connected to or affiliated with the University of Stuttgart (founded in 1829), although there is collaboration between the two.

The first director of the academy was Johann Nepomuk Schwerz, and it was located in Hohenheim Palace, built by Charles Eugene, Duke of Württemberg.

In 1847 the institution was designated as holding the rank of an "Academy of Agriculture and Forestry". In 1904 the name was changed to "Agricultural College". Hohenheim College was awarded the right to confer doctorates in 1918 and habilitations in 1919. With the appointment of Margarete von Wrangell to the chair for plant nutrition in 1923, she became the first female full professor at a German university. During the period of National Socialism, the university was brought into line with the party's ideology, and it was forced to close in 1945.

Architecturally, the university that re-opened its doors in 1946 had survived World War II relatively undamaged. In 1964 the faculties of Agricultural Sciences and Natural Sciences were created, followed in 1968 by the Faculty of Business, Economics and Social Sciences. Hohenheim has enjoyed university status since 1967 when it became known as Universität Hohenheim.

Today there are approximately 9,000 students and a teaching staff of around 900, of which slightly more than 100 are professors. Over 2,000 people now work at the university. The rector of the university until September 2024 was the agricultural economist Stephan Dabbert (born 23 June 1958), who took office on 1 April 2012. Dr. Dabbert stepped down as rector of the university in September 2024 for medical reasons and died on 1 October 2024.

== Location ==
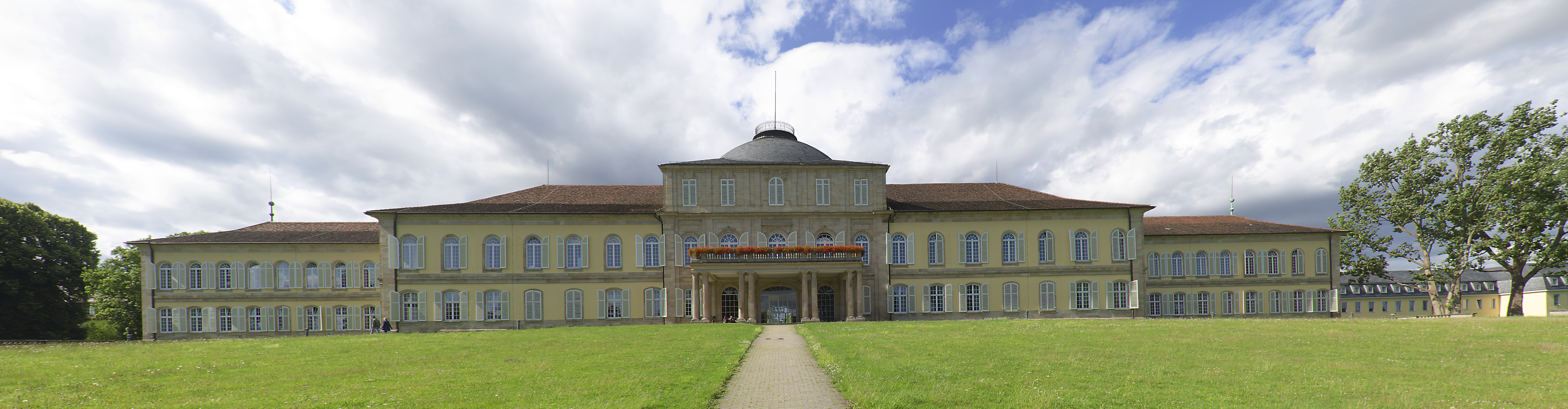
Hohenheim Palace

The University of Hohenheim is located in southwest Germany, in the district of Plieningen on the southern rim of Baden in Württemberg's capital, Stuttgart. It was named the most beautiful campus university in Baden-Württemberg in 2009 and is generally acknowledged as having one of the most picturesque campuses in the country. The baroque palace, the University's emblem and its main building, is surrounded by the historic parklands and botanical Hohenheim Gardens including the historic Landesarboretum Baden-Württemberg. The campus is close to the light rail line U3 station Plieningen Garbe (Stuttgart Stadtbahn) and is within minutes of the Stuttgart airport, Stuttgart Exhibition Center and major motorways.

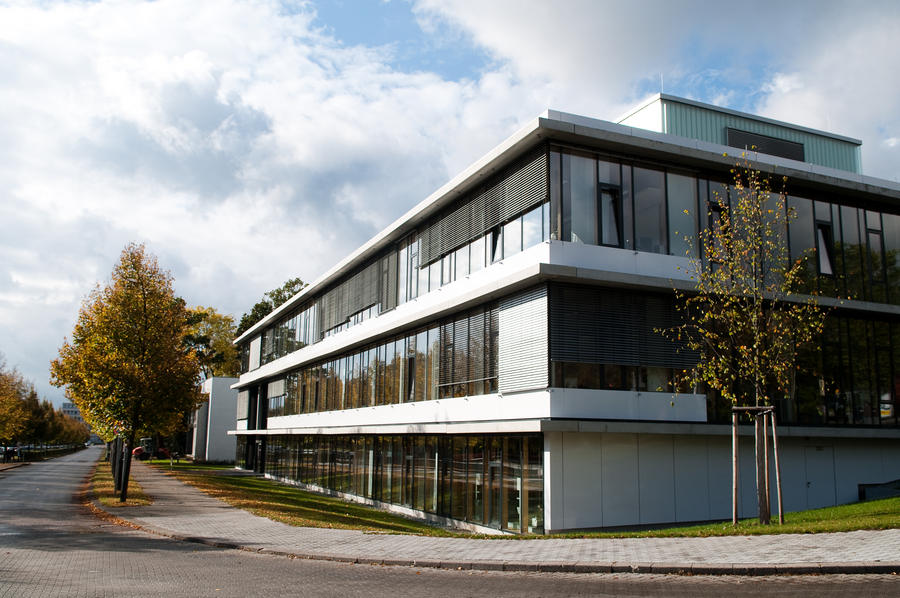
The Institute of Food Science and Biotechnology

== Academics ==
=== Research ===
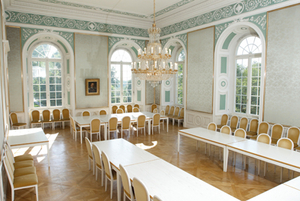
Green Room within the Palace

The university currently pursues research in the fields of health, nutrition, agriculture, consumer protection and environmental protection, as well as economics and communication.

Areas of particular importance include:

- Agricultural and nutritional sciences within the food chain
- Biobased products and bioenergy from agriculture
- Biological signals
- Bioeffector research Biofector
- Innovation and services

=== University networks ===
The university is active in academic alliances and is a member of both the ELLS and the HERMES university networks.

==== ELLS ====
The University of Hohenheim was co-founder of the Euroleague for Life Sciences (ELLS) which was established in 2001. This university life sciences network presently includes the following members:

- University of Hohenheim (UHOH), Stuttgart, Germany
- University of Copenhagen Faculty of Science (KU), Copenhagen, Denmark
- Swedish University of Agricultural Sciences (SLU), Uppsala, Sweden
- University of Natural Resources and Applied Life Sciences Vienna (BOKU), Austria
- Wageningen University and Research Centre (WUR), the Netherlands
- Czech University of Life Sciences Prague (CULS), Czech Republic and
- Warsaw University of Life Science (SGGW), Poland.
- University of Kassel, Kassel, Germany.
- Szent István University, Gödöllö, Hungary

Main fields of co-operation in ELLS are:

- joint curriculum development
- student and staff mobility
- pooling of expertise
- quality assurance
- development of university policy and strategy
- internationalization

===== HERMES =====
The HERMES (Higher Education and Research in Management of European UniversitieS) network is a strategic alliance of 18 leading European universities in 11 countries. Its goal is to offer dual degree programs in Management on all academic levels: Bachelor's, Master's and Doctoral studies.

The participating universities work closely together in defining their study programs, exchanging professors and organizing joint research projects. Each year, this network holds an annual conference at one of the partner universities, where common programs are defined and achievements are reported.

=== Scientific Centers of the University ===
- Life Science Center
- Eastern Europe Center (EEC)
- Center for Bioenergy and Biobased Products
- Competence Center for Plant Breeding
- Center for Agriculture in the Tropics and Subtropics
- Food Security Center
- Center for Research on Innovation and Services
- Competence Center Gender and Nutrition

=== Rankings ===
University rankings

Overall – Global & National
QS World 2024	651–660	37
THE World 2024	251–300	25–31

According to the QS World University Rankings of 2024, the university is placed within the 651–660 range globally, while holding the 37th position nationally. In the Times Higher Education World University Rankings for 2024, the university is ranked between 251 and 300 internationally, and between 25 and 31 within Germany.

== Museums ==
The university's museums are open to the general public. Visitors can take a tour through the history of agriculture in the German Agricultural Museum, which encompasses 5,700 sq.m. of covered exhibition space. The Zoological and Veterinary Museum has a collection of teaching aids and curiosities on display in a traditional exhibition in the palace. Set in the Exotic Garden of the university, the Hohenheim History Museum in the Spielhaus tells the history of the municipality, the palace and the university.

== Special characteristics ==
- The University of Hohenheim has been accredited as being a family-oriented university since 2004.
- The university possesses its own cemetery, where professors were buried a long time ago. Today it is used very rarely.
- According to a survey conducted to elect the most beautiful campus in Germany, the university could reach the 7th place in the overall placings in 2009. Therefore, it is seen as one of the most beautiful campuses in Baden-Württemberg.
- The university hosts the Josef G. Knoll Visiting Professorship for Development Studies, a chair endowed by Senator Herman Eiselen. The first holder, Prof. Dr. Patrick Webb, established a programme of teaching and research from 1996 through 1998. He was succeeded by Prof. Dr. Dieter Neubert (1999/2000), Prof. Dr. Heinz-Rüdiger Korff (2000–2004), and PD Dr. Thomas Berger (2004–2007).

== Notable professors and alumni ==
- Enno Bahrs (born 1967), is an agricultural scientist and economist, and tax expert, at the University
- Dietrich Büsselberg (born 1957), is a physiologist, academic, and author. He is an Associate Dean and Professor of Physiology and Biophysics at Weill Cornell Medicine–Qatar.
- Stephan Dabbert (1958–2024), German agricultural economist and Rector of the University
- Werner Doppler (born 1941), German agricultural and economical
- Günther Franz (1902–1992), German agricultural historian, Rector of the University from 1963 to 1967
- Ruediger Heining (born 1968), German agricultural scientist and economist
- Wilhelm Hertenstein (1825–1888), Swiss politician and President of the Confederation 1888
- Winfried Kretschmann (born 1948), German politician of the Green Party of Germany, Minister-President of the state of Baden-Württemberg since 2011
- Abdul Ghafar Lakanwal, Afghan cabinet minister
- Hans-Peter Liebig (1945), German agricultural scientist and Rektor of the University 2002–2012
- Uwe Ludewig (born 1967), German agricultural scientist and Director of the Institute of Crop Science Hohenheim
- Stefan Mappus (born 1966), German politician from the Christian Democratic Union (CDU). He was Minister President of the state of Baden-Württemberg 2010–2011
- Torsten Müller (born 1962), German agricultural scientist and Dean of Education of the Agricultural Science Faculty in Hohenheim
- Guenter Neumann (born 1958), German plant physiologist and scientific coordinator of the EU Research Project Biofector
- Manfred G. Raupp (born 1941), German agricultural and economical scientist
- Volker Roemheld (1941–2013), German agricultural scientist, plant physiologist and soil biologist at Hohenheim University
- Wilhelm Conrad Roentgen (1845–1923), German physicist, discoverer of X-rays
- Satyabrata Sarkar (born 1928), Indian virologist
- Jürgen Stark (born 1948), German economist and prior chief economist of the European Central Bank
- Ralf T. Voegele (born 1963), German biologist and Dean of the Agricultural Science Faculty in Hohenheim
- F. Wolfgang Schnell (1913–2006), German professor of applied genetics and plant breeding
- Markus Weinmann (born 1974), German agricultural scientist in the area of Plant Physiology
- Margarete von Wrangell (1877–1932), Baltic German agricultural chemist and the first female full professor at a German university
- Joshua Sikhu Okonya (born 1979), is a Ugandan agricultural entomologist
- Juergen Zeddies (born 1942), is a German agricultural economist and Emeritus of the University
