= International Association for the Plant Protection Sciences =

- Abbreviation: IAPPS
- Formation: 1946
- Type: Scientific
- Purpose: Research
- Location: Nebraska
- Region served: world wide
- President / Secretary General: Geoff Norton / Enver A. Heinrichs
- Website: https://www.plantprotection.org

The International Association for the Plant Protection Sciences (IAPPS) has the goal of gathering the results of plant protection research worldwide and making them globally available to science and practice. To this end the organisation periodically publishes the Plant Protection Magazine and every four years organises an international congress. The association has an official scientific journal, Crop Protection, published by Elsevier.

== History ==
The IAPPS was founded in 1946 during the first International Plant Congress in Louvain, Belgium. The first president of the organisation was Olaf Freyberg of Malmö, Sweden, who made the following comment: The world needs a plant protection organization, and not only to plan future congresses, but much more provide a platform for the discussion of current research results amongst scientists.

Over the years a newsletter has been periodically published, a yearbook has appeared, and congresses have been held. Every four years international congresses have been held in various parts of the globe. Plant protection scientists and agricultural research societies from all over the world are represented in the governing body. The IAPPS organisation now has 15 regional offices.

The International Plant Protection Congress in Berlin in 2015 meetings was organized by the German Phytomedical Society (Deutsche Phytomedizinische Gesellschaft), the Julius Kuehn Institute and the German Association of Industrialpartners for Agriculture.

== Congress - Year Venue; President, Organisers ==
- 1- 1946 Louvain, Belgium; Dr. A. Strassens
- 2- 1949 London, England; Viscount Bledisloe
- 3- 1952 Paris, France; Dr. Jean Lefevre
- 4- 1957 Hamburg, Germany; Prof. H. Richter
- 5- 1963 London, England; Sir Robert Robinson
- 6- 1967 Vienna, Austria; Prof. F. Beran
- 7- 1970 Paris, France; Dr.Jean Bustarret / Dr. M. Colas
- 8- 1975 Moscow, USSR; Dr. Ivan Churayev / Dr. A. A. Goltsov
- 9- 1979 Washington, DC; Dr. James D. Horsfall Dr. Bill Tweedy/APS
- 10- 1983 Brighton, UK; Dr. Leonard Broadbent / Dr. E. Lester
- 11- 1987 Manila, Philippines; Dr. Jose Velsaco/ Dr. Edwin Magallona
- 12- 1991 Rio de Janeiro, Brazil; Mr. Omuz F. Rivaldo/ Christiano W. Simon
- 13- 1995 The Hague, Netherlands; Dr. Johan Dekker/ Prof. Dr. Jan Zadoks
- 14- 1999 Jerusalem, Israel; Dr. Yoram Rossler/ Dr. Jaacov Katan
- 15- 2004 Beijing, P.R. China; Hans Herren/IAPPS/ Dr. Cheng Zhuo-min/ CSPP L. Apple/IAPPS
- 16- 2007 Glasgow, Scotland; Hans Herren/IAPPS/ Dr. David V. Alford/BCPC E.A.Heinrichs/IAPPS
- 17- 2011 Honolulu, Hawaii; Geoff Norton / Ray Martyn/APS B. G.Tweedy/IAPPS E. A. Heinrichs/IAPPS
- 18- 2015 Berlin, Germany; Geoff Norton/ Falko Feldmann DPG Geoff Norton/IAPPS E.A. Heinrichs/IAPPS
- 19 2019 Hyderabad, India; Geoff Norton/IAPPS/ Hari C Sharma and Rajan Sharma/ICRISAT/ E. A. Heinrichs/IAPPS
