= Silvia Hildegard Haneklaus =

German agricultural scientist

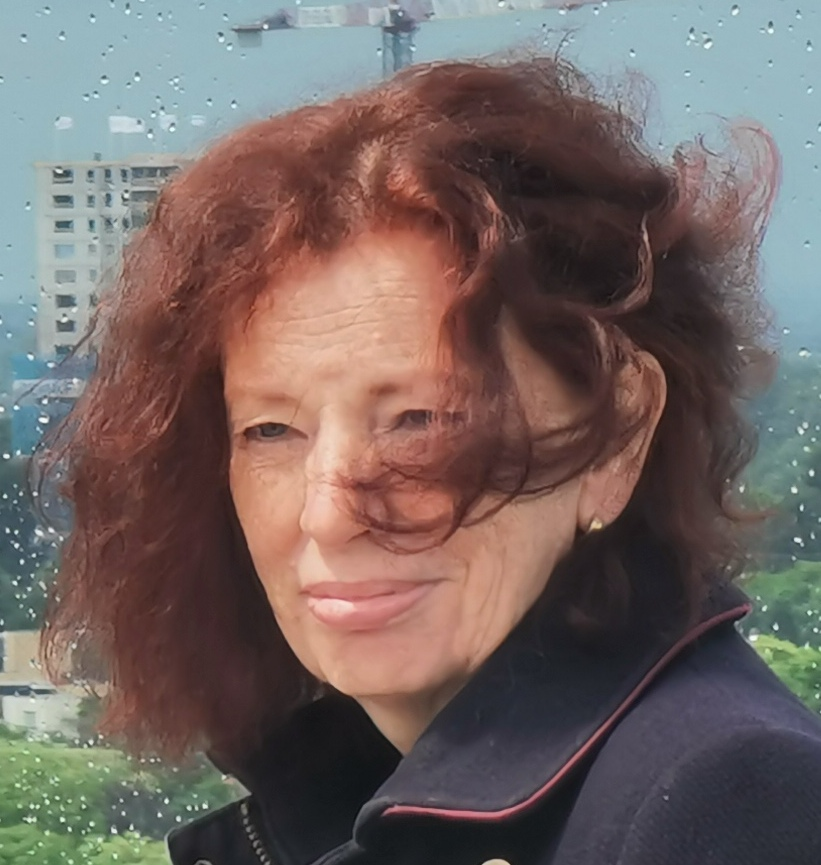
- Born: 17 October 1959 (age 66); Rheine, North Rhine-Westphalia, West Germany

Silvia Hildegard Haneklaus (born 17 October 1959) is a German agricultural scientist and researcher specialised in Plant nutrition and Soil science.

== Education ==
Haneklaus was born in Rheine, North Rhine-Westphalia. She studied agriculture at Christian-Albrechts-Universität zu Kiel (CAU) and in 1983 published her thesis about the essentiality of chlorine for plant life. In 1989 she completed her doctorate and received the title “Dr. sc. agr.” at the Faculty of Agriculture in Kiel with a thesis about fertilizer strategies to combat uptake of radionuclides by food plants in the aftermath of the reactor disaster in Chernobyl.

== Scientific career ==
From 1990 to 1991 Haneklaus was principal investigator of a technology-transfer project for Precision agriculture (PA) at the Institute of Plant Nutrition and Soil Science at CAU in Kiel. 1991–1992 she worked as freelancer in PA for the Danish Agricultural Advisory Service, and on Remote sensing at the ‘Institute for Agricultural And Agroecological Innovations and Technologies” (ILLIT) Ltd. in Kiel. 1992 Haneklaus became a senior scientist at the Institute of Plant Nutrition and Soil Science Bundesforschungsanstalt für Landwirtschaft in Braunschweig (FAL) where she implemented with Ewald Schnug international recognized competence centres for research on sulphur nutrition of crop plants and Precision agriculture. From 1997 to 1998 she was member of a governmental working group drafting government regulations to prevent radiation exposition of the public after nuclear accidents. In 2002 Haneklaus was appointed Director & Professor at the Federal Agricultural Research Institute (FAL), since 2008 Julius Kühn-Institut (JKI) in Braunschweig. Since 2010 she is acting as Secretary General for the International Scientific Centre of Fertilizers (CIEC) in Shenyang, China which was founded in 1933 in Rome. End of October 2022 she retired regularly at JKI.

== Awards ==
In 2008, Haneklaus, was awarded the Diploma of Excellency of the Romanian Academy of Agricultural and Forestry Sciences ‘Gheorghe Ionescu-Şişeşti’.

== Research highlights ==
Haneklaus contributed essentially to the development of the X-ray fluorescence method for the determination of the Glucosinolate-(GSL) content of rapeseed, which was employed already in 1987 nationwide during the harvest period of oilseed rape in order to differentiate old (high glucosinolate containing) (0-oilseed rape) cultivars from new (low glucosinolate containing (00-oilseed rape) varieties. Issues of sulfur nutrition of crop plants, with focus on resistance to abiotic and biotic stress were later one of her main research subjects. In 2001 Haneklaus coined with Ewald Schnug the term ‘Sulphur-Induced Resistance’ (SIR) which became a major focus in the research portfolio of FAL/JKI. Later in her career she dedicated her research nutritional and medical issues of uranium in food and water

== Publications (Selection) ==
- with E. Schnug (1987): Indirekte Bestimmung des Gesamtglucosinolatgehaltes von Rapssamen mittels Röntgenfluoreszenzanalyse. In: Fresenius Z. Anal. Chem. 326, 1987, S. 441–445.
- with E. Bloem and E. Schnug (2003): “The global sulphur cycle and its link to plant environment”. In: Abrol YP, Ahmand A (eds.), Sulphur in Plants. Kluwer Academic, Dordrecht, The Netherlands, pp 1–28.
- with E. Schnug (2005): Sulphur deficiency symptoms in oilseed rape (Brassica Napus L.) – The aesthetics of starvation. In: Phyton 45, 79–95.
- with E. Schnug, L. J. De Kok, I. Stulen and E. Bloem (2006): Sulfur. In: Barker and Pilbeam (eds.): Handbook of Plant Nutrition. CRC Press, Boca Raton, Florida 2006, S. 183–238.
- with E. Schnug (2006): Site specific nutrient management – objectives, current status and future research needs. In: A. Srinivasan (eds.): Precision Farming – A global perspective. Marcel Dekker, New York, 91–151.
- with E. Schnug (2008): A critical evaluation of phytoextraction on uranium contaminated agricultural soils. In: Loads and Fate of Fertilizer Derived Uranium, pp. 111–125. Edited by L.J. De Kok & E. Schnug. Backhuys Publishers, Leiden, The Netherlands.
- with E. Schnug, M. Birke, N. Costa, F. Knolle, J. Fleckenstein, K. Panten and H. Lilienthal (2008): Uranium in German mineral and tap waters. In: Loads and Fate of Fertilizer Derived Uranium, pp. 11–22. Edited by L.J. De Kok & E. Schnug. Backhuys Publishers, Leiden, The Netherlands.
- with E. Schnug (2016): Glucosinolates – The Agricultural Story. In S. Kopriva (Ed.), Glucosinolates. pp. 281–302, 2016 Elsevier Ltd., ISBN 978-0-08-100327-5.
- with E. Schnug (2016): “The Enigma of Fertilizer Phosphorus Utilization”. In: Phosphorus in Agriculture: 100% Zero, pp 7–26, Springer, 2016, DOI: 10.1007/978-94-017-7612-7_2
- with E. Schnug (2018): “Hungry Plants—A Short Treatise on How to Feed Crops under Stress” Agriculture, 8, 43; Hungry Plants—A Short Treatise on How to Feed Crops under Stress
- with H. Windmann, M. Maekawa, L. Zhang and E. Schnug (2021): “Diet Controls Uranium Intake and Aggravates Health Hazards”. Medical Research Archives 2021. Medical Research Archives
- with A. Dollacker, R. Oppermann and R. de Graeff (2021): "Dually-beneficial habitats serve as a practical biodiversity mainstreaming tool in European crop production". Journal of cultivated plants. 73, 53–71. Doi: 10.5073/JfK.2021.03-04.01
