= Ginka Steinwachs =

German playwright and author

Ginka Steinwachs (born 31 October 1942) is a German educator and writer.

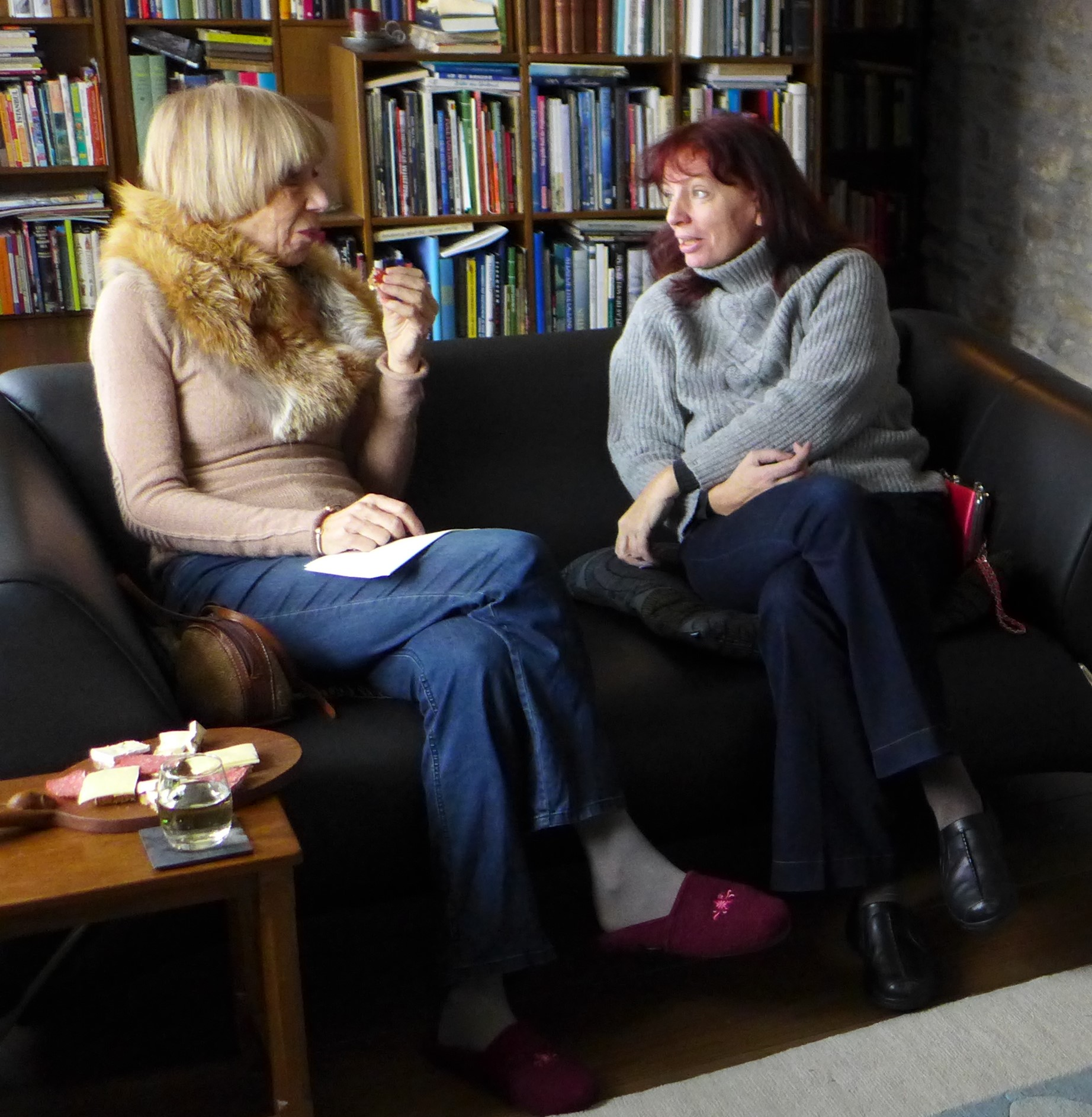
Ginka Steinwachs (left) and Silvia Hildegard Haneklaus (right) Januar 2014 in the "Glucsburgh" in Goslar

The daughter of Walter S. Steinwachs and Hildegard Feist, she was born Gisela Steinwachs in Göttingen and was educated in Munich, Berlin and Paris. Her PhD thesis on André Breton was later published as Mythologie des Surrealismus. Steinwachs has lectured at several universities in France and Germany. She married Tilbert Stegmann. Since 2000, she has been living in Berlin.

She has won:

- the literary prize of the city of Erlangen
- the literary prize of the city of Munich
- the Prix Hubert Fichte of the city of Hamburg

== Selected works ==
- Tränende Herzen (Crying hearts), play (1977) (https://www.youtube.com/watch?v=UWYJdz6l0pc)
- Marylinparis, novel (1978)
- Berliner Trichter. Bilderbogen (Berlin Funnel/Picture page) (1979)
- George Sand, play (1980)
- Ein Mund von Welt (A mouth full of world), prose (1989)
- Vollmund (Full mouth), prose (1991)
