= Kornelia Smalla =

Chemist (born 1956)

Kornelia Smalla (born 1956) is a chemist and biotechnologist at the Julius Kuehn Institute (JKI) in Braunschweig and a university lecturer in microbiology at the Technical University of Braunschweig.

== Life and work ==
After finishing school, Smalla studied chemistry at the Martin Luther University of Halle-Wittenberg (1975-1980) and was awarded a chemistry diploma. She became a scientific assistant at the Institute für Biochemistry in the Medical Faculty of the same university and obtained the qualification Dr. rer nat in Biochemistry in 1985, and professorship with Venia Legendi in microbiology in 1999.

From 1984 to 1991 she led the Reference Laboratory for Hygiene Risks in Biotechnology Processes at the District Hygiene Institute in Magdeburg, and from 1991 to 2007 she was a scientific assistant at the State Institute of Biology in Agriculture and Forestry in Braunschweig. Since 2008 she has been at the successor institution, the Julius Kuehn Institute, State Research Institute for Crop Plants, at the Institute for Epidemiology and Pathogen Diagnostics as head of the Microbial Oncology and Bacterial Phytopathogens group.

Since 2006 Smalla has been a Non-Scheduled Professor of Microbiology at Braunschweig TU. She has received an Honorary Doctorate in Agricultural Science from the Swedish University of Agricultural Sciences in Uppsala. She represents her area of expertise of structural and functional diversity of microbiological colonies and their interaction in the EU Biofector Project Rhizosphere.

== Fields of work ==
- Development and use of molecular culture-dependent and independent detection methods for bacterial pathogens
- Epidemiology of bacterial pathogens with the aid of molecular detection methods
- Interaction of agonists, pathogens and microbial colonies in the rhizosphere
- Effect of soil, plant species and variety, and agricultural practice on the structural and functional diversity of microbial colonies in the rhizosphere
- Adaptation and diversification of bacteria (including bacterial pathogens) by means of plasmids
- Ecology of bacterial resistance genes

== Appraisal ==
Kornelia Smalla has worked on her speciality of microbial ecology at the Julius Kuehn Institute (JKI) and its forerunner the Biological State Institute for Agriculture and Forestry since 1991 in her research focus, microbial ecology, which includes the interaction of pathogens and their antagonists in the root area of plants and the diversity of microbial communities in the rhizosphere overall. This involves the effects which originate from the soil, plant species and variety, and agricultural use and processes, on the structural and functional diversity of microbial communities. Smalla develops and puts to use molecular detection methods. The results of her work have substantially contributed to a greater understanding of the soil microbiome.

== Memberships ==
- Society of General and Applied Microbiology (VAAM)
- American Society of Microbiology
- International Society for Microbial Ecology (ISME)
- SETAC
- German Phytomedical Society (DPG)
- Editor of
  - FEMS Microbiology Ecology
  - Frontiers in Microbiology
  - BMC Microbiology
- Editorial board:
  - Applied and Environmental Microbiology
  - ISME Journal
- Ad-hoc-reviewer a number of scientific journals:
  - Microbial Ecology
  - Soil Biology and Biochemistry
  - Plasmid
  - Microbiology
  - Applied Soil Ecology
  - New Phytologist
  - Environmental Microbiology

== Awards ==
- Honorary Doctorate of the Swedish University of Agricultural Sciences in Uppsala (2011)
- Badge of Honour of the Julius Kuehn Institute (2016)
- Science Prize of the German Phytomedical Society (DPG), presented by Johannes Hallmann (2016)

== Publication (selection) ==
- Kornelia Smalla has been an author of 187 publications which have been cited 10,407 times; her h-index is 52 (8/2016).
- Publicationlink of Kornelia Smalla on the web page JKI
