= FZG =

FZG may refer to:

- FZG, car plate code for Żagań County, Poland
- FZG, abbreviation for German Freizeitgestaltung (Free Time Department), sponsor in the Theresienstadt Ghetto
- FZG, abbreviation for German Forschungsstelle für Zahnräder und Getriebesysteme (Gear Research Center), organization directed by Karsten Stahl
- FZG, abbreviation for German Flakzielgerät, part of the Luftflotte 3
- FZG, FAA code for Fitzgerald Municipal Airport, an airport in Georgia, United States
- FZG, code for Zingem railway station, a railway station in Belgium
