= German Phytomedicine Society =

Voluntary association

Deutsche Phytomedizinische Gesellschaft e.V.
- Abbreviation: DPG
- Formation: 1928 /1949
- Type: Scientific
- Purpose: Research
- Location: Germany
- President / CEO: Annette Reineke
- Website: Homepage DPG

The Scientific Society for Plant Protection and Plant Health in Germany is the professional association of practitioners and scientists of plant health, plant protection, and plant diseases, as successor to the Association of German Plant Physicians that was based in Berlin from 1928 to 1937. The DPG was founded in 1949 in Fulda. The DPG headquarters is located in Braunschweig

The society focuses on research of parasites and other growth problems of crop plants, consultancy in the area of Phytomedicine and disease, and measures for health maintenance in plants. It is a member of the editorial board of the Journal of Plant Diseases and Protection and has participated in the German Plant Protection Conference & the International DPG Berlin Symposium. The DPG has published its findings in the journal PHYTOMEDICINE as well a series titled "SPECTRUM PHYTOMEDIZIN."

The DPG is a member of the Organisation for Plant Protection in Europe and the Mediterranean, German Nation Committee for Biology (DNK), International Association for the Plant Protection Sciences, and the International Society for Plant Pathology.

== Notable members ==
- Georg F. Backhaus
- Holger B. Deising
- Falko Feldmann
- Johannes Hallmann
- Johannes A. Jehle
- Karl Fritz Lauer
- Manfred G. Raupp
- Kornelia Smalla
- Ralf T. Voegele
