= Ewald Schnug =

German agricultural scientist (born 1954)

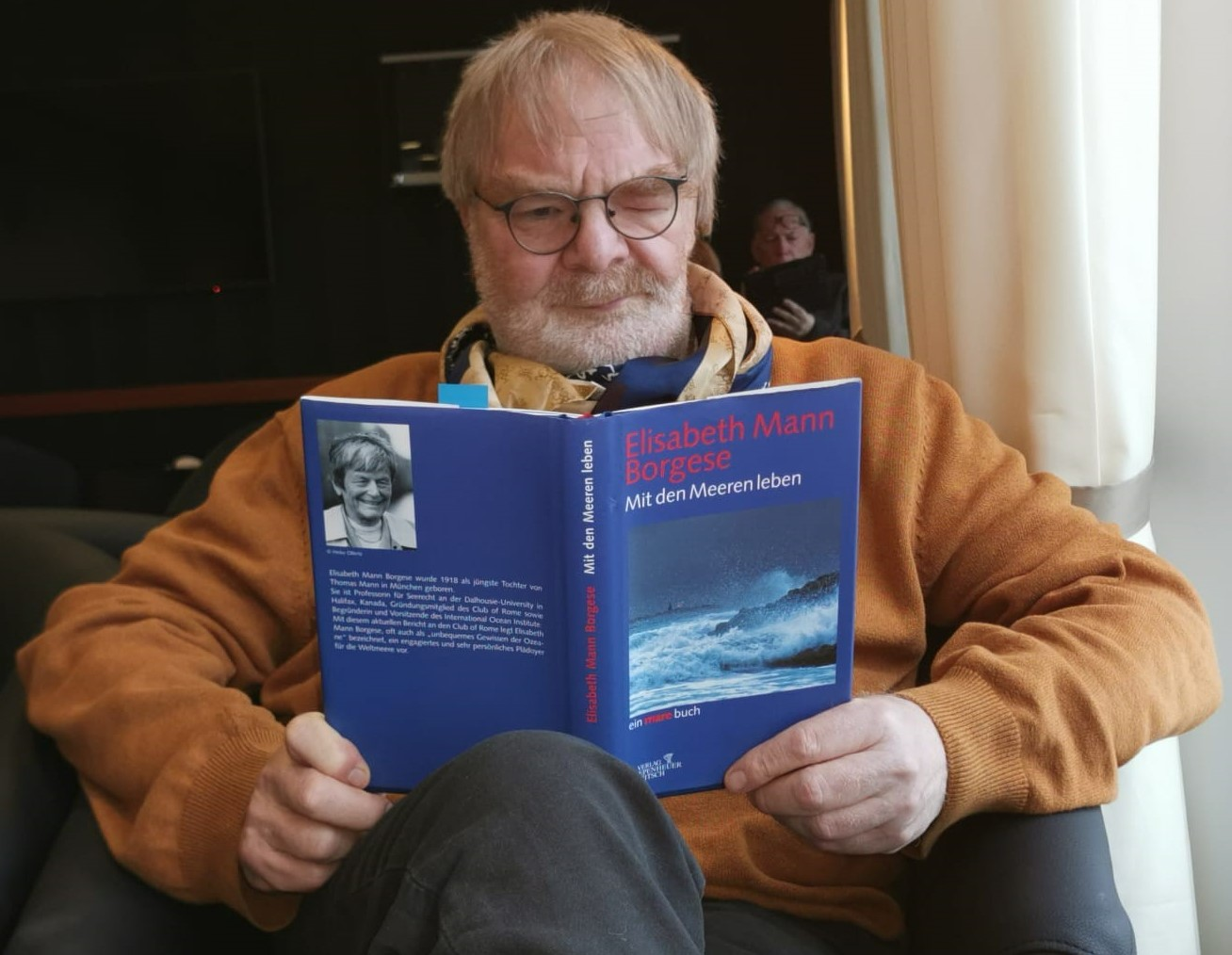
Ewald Schnug on DFDS King Seaways 12.02.2022

Ewald Schnug (born 7 September 1954) is a German agricultural scientist, university lecturer and researcher specializing in plant nutrition and soil science.

== Education and scientific career ==
In 1978 he received his diploma in the discipline plant production at Christian-Albrechts-Universität zu Kiel. In 1982 he completed his doctorate with Dr. sc. agr. at the Faculty of Agriculture in Kiel where he completed also his DSc in 1989. In 1992 he was awarded the title Dr. rer. nat. habil. by the Faculty of Natural Science of Technischen Universität Carolo Wilhelmina zu Braunschweig.

== Career ==
In 1992 he became head of the Institute of Plant Nutrition and Soil Science Bundesforschungsanstalt für Landwirtschaft in Braunschweig (FAL) and since 2008 head of the Institute for Crop and Soil Science of the Federal Research Institute for Cultivated Plants, Julius Kühn-Institut in Braunschweig/Quedlinburg. Since 1992 he is professor and member of the Natural Science Faculty of Carolo-Wilhelmina University in Braunschweig (nowadays Faculty of Life Sciences).

From June 1996 to September 2010 he was vice-president for research and strategic planning, hereafter first German president of the society and since September 2019 its second Honorary President.

From 1993 to 2010 he was a personally appointed member of the Scientific Advisory Board on Fertiliser Issues (BMEL), from 2004 to 2020 (founding) member of the Commission Soil Protection at the German Environment Agency (UBA) and was from 2007-2020 scientific adviser for Germany in the German/Egyptian Research Fund (GERF).

== Awards ==
- 2008: Honorary doctorate (Dr. h.c.) of the Romanian Academy of Agricultural and Forestry Sciences ‘Gheorghe Ionescu-Şişeşti’
- 2019: Appointment Honorary President of CIEC for life (Internationales wissenschaftliches Zentrum für Düngung, Shenyang China)
- 2016: Nomination of Visiting Professor at the ‘Institute of Applied Ecology’ of the Chinese Academy of Sciences in Shenyang, China
- 2020: Award for International Scientific Cooperation of the Chinese Academy of Sciences (CAS)

== Literature ==
- Feldhoff, H. und Gneist, C.: Ewald Schnug in Westerwälder Köpfe – 33 Porträts herausragender Persönlichkeiten Rhein Mosel Verlag, Zell/Mosel 2014, ISBN 978-3-89801-073-3, S. 147–150.
