= Karsten Stahl =

German engineer and professor (born 1969)

Karsten Stahl (born 11 March 1969 in Munich) is a German mechanical engineer. He is a Professor in the TUM School of Engineering and Design at the Technical University of Munich (TUM) and is considered a specialist in machine elements, transmissions and drivetrain technologies.

== Career ==
From 1989 to 1994, Stahl studied mechanical engineering specializing in construction and development at the Technical University of Munich. In 2001, he did his doctorate at the Gear Research Center (FZG), chair of machine elements at the TUM. The title of his thesis was: Pitting Resistance of carburized Spur- and Helical Gears.

Between 2001 and 2010, he worked in various positions for BMW. In 2001, he started as a development engineer in gear production, later as head of prototyping, gear technology and methods in Dingolfing. In 2006, he moved to Oxford, where he initially worked as quality manager for transmission and later as head of validation for chassis and powertrain in the Mini plant. In 2009, he took over responsibility for advanced engineering and innovation management for powertrain and driving dynamic systems at BMW in Munich. From 2003 until 2011, he was a member and representative of the FVA Scientific Advisory Board.

Since 2011, he has been full professor at the chair of machine elements and director of the Gear Research Center (FZG) at the Technical University of Munich. His main research areas include machine elements and drivetrain components such as gears, synchronizers, multi-plate clutches, rolling-element bearings and electromechanical drivetrain systems.

Stahl is a member of several program committees, such as e.g. "VDI: Getriebe in Fahrzeugen", "VDI: Kupplungen", "VDI: Schwingungen in Antrieben" and "bayern innovativ: Conference on Future Automotive Technology". He is president of several conference committees, such as e.g. "VDI: International Conference on Gears", "VDI: International Conference High Performance Plastic Gears" and "VDI: International Conference Gears Production". Since 2016, he is member of the German "Scientific Association for Product Development (WiGeP)" where he was announced as Speaker of the Board in 2018. Since 2022, he is also member of the Editorial Board of the international, peer-reviewed, open access journal "Lubricants" by MDPI.

== Honors and awards ==
- 2021: Honorary Certificate of TUM for Excellence in Teaching
- 2015 – 2023: 8x Student Lecture Award “Goldene Lehre”, best lecture course, B.Sc. Mech. Eng.
- 2020 – 2021: 2x Student Lecture Award “Goldene Lehre” in M.Sc. Mech. Eng.
- 2019: VDMA Faculty Teaching Concept Award, “Bestes Maschinenhaus”
- 2005: Verein Deutscher Ingenieure (VDI) Ring of Honors Award
- 1999: Award of the Forschungsvereinigung Antriebstechnik e.V.
- 1992: FAG Kugelfischer Award

== Writings and publications ==
- Karsten Stahl: Grübchentragfähigkeit einsatzgehärteter Gerad- und Schrägverzahnungen unter besonderer Berücksichtigung der Pressungsverteilung. Dissertation. Technical University of Munich. Munich 2001.
- Gustav Niemann, Hans Winter, Bernd-Robert Höhn, Karsten Stahl: Maschinenelemente. Band 1: Konstruktion und Berechnung von Verbindungen, Lagern, Wellen. Springer-Verlag 2019.
