= Rheine =

- Town
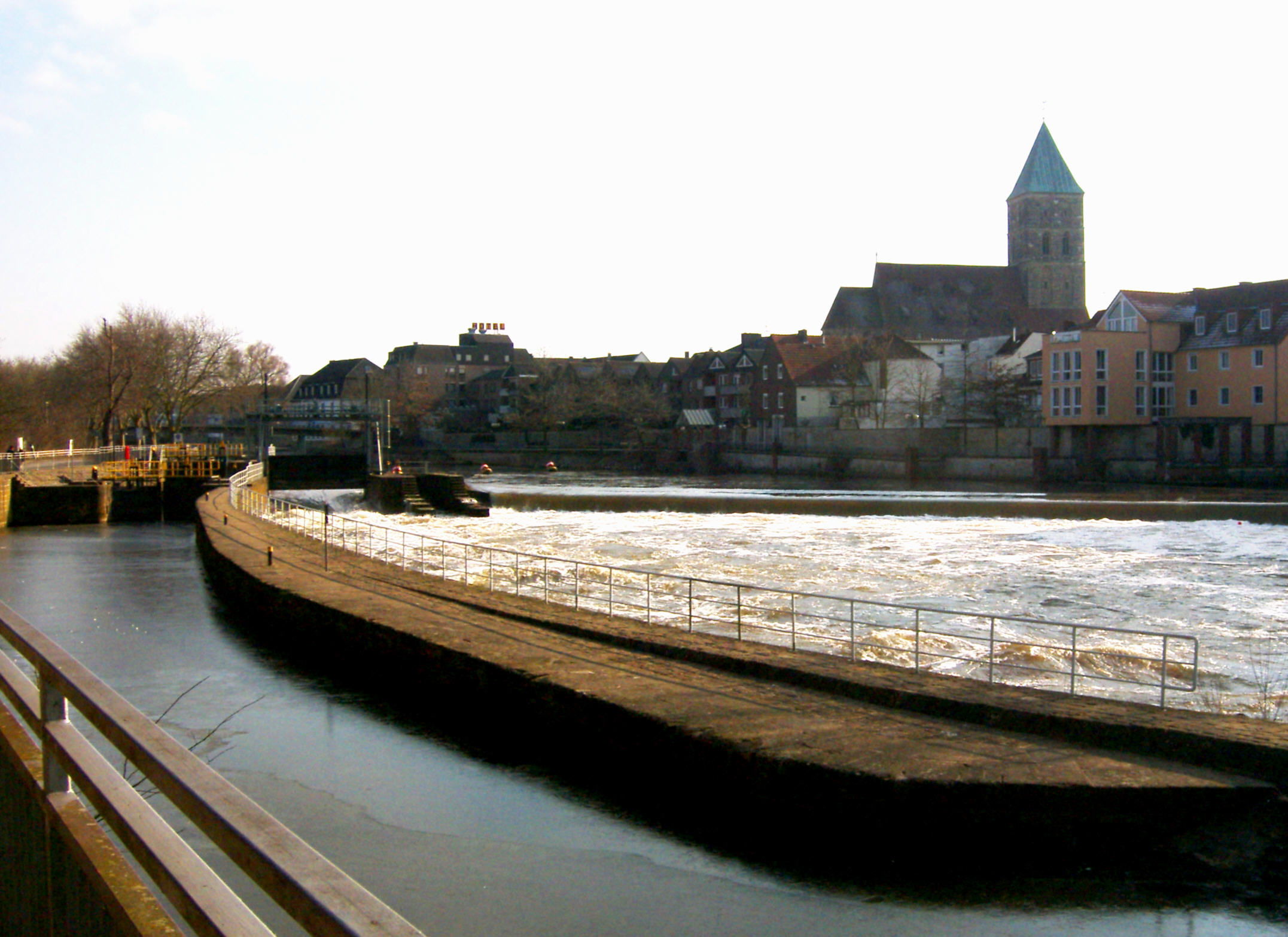

- Flag Coat of arms

- Location of Rheine within Steinfurt district
- Interactive map of Rheine
- Location within Germany Location within North Rhine-Westphalia
- Coordinates: 52°17′N 7°26′E
- Country: Germany
- State: North Rhine-Westphalia
- Admin. region: Münster
- District: Steinfurt

Government
  - Mayor (2020–25): Peter Lüttmann (CDU)

Area
  - Total: 145 km^{2} (56 sq mi)
- Elevation: 35 m (115 ft)

Population (2025-12-31)
  - Total: 77,552
  - Density: 535/km^{2} (1,390/sq mi)
- Time zone: UTC+01:00 (CET)
  - Summer (DST): UTC+02:00 (CEST)
- Postal codes: 48429-48432
- Dialling codes: 05971, 05975, 05459
- Vehicle registration: ST, BF, TE
- Website: www.rheine.de

Rheine (German: [ˈʁaɪnə]) is a city in the district of Steinfurt in Westphalia, Germany. It is the largest city in the district and the location of Rheine Air Base.

== Geography ==
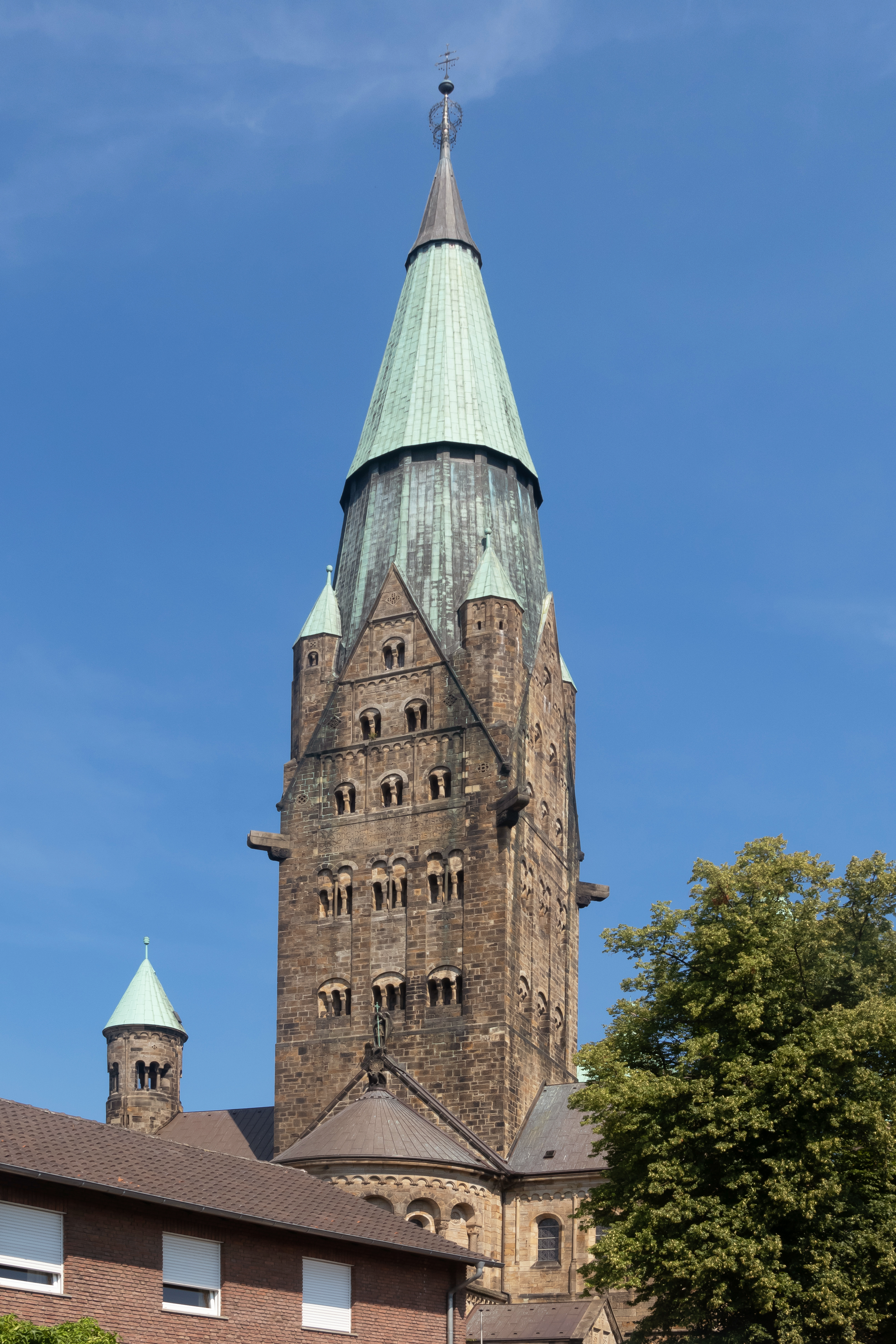
Sankt Antonius Basilika

Rheine is on the river Ems, about 40 kilometres (25 mi) north of Münster, 45 kilometres (28 mi) west of Osnabrück and 45 kilometres (28 mi) east of Hengelo (Netherlands).

== History ==
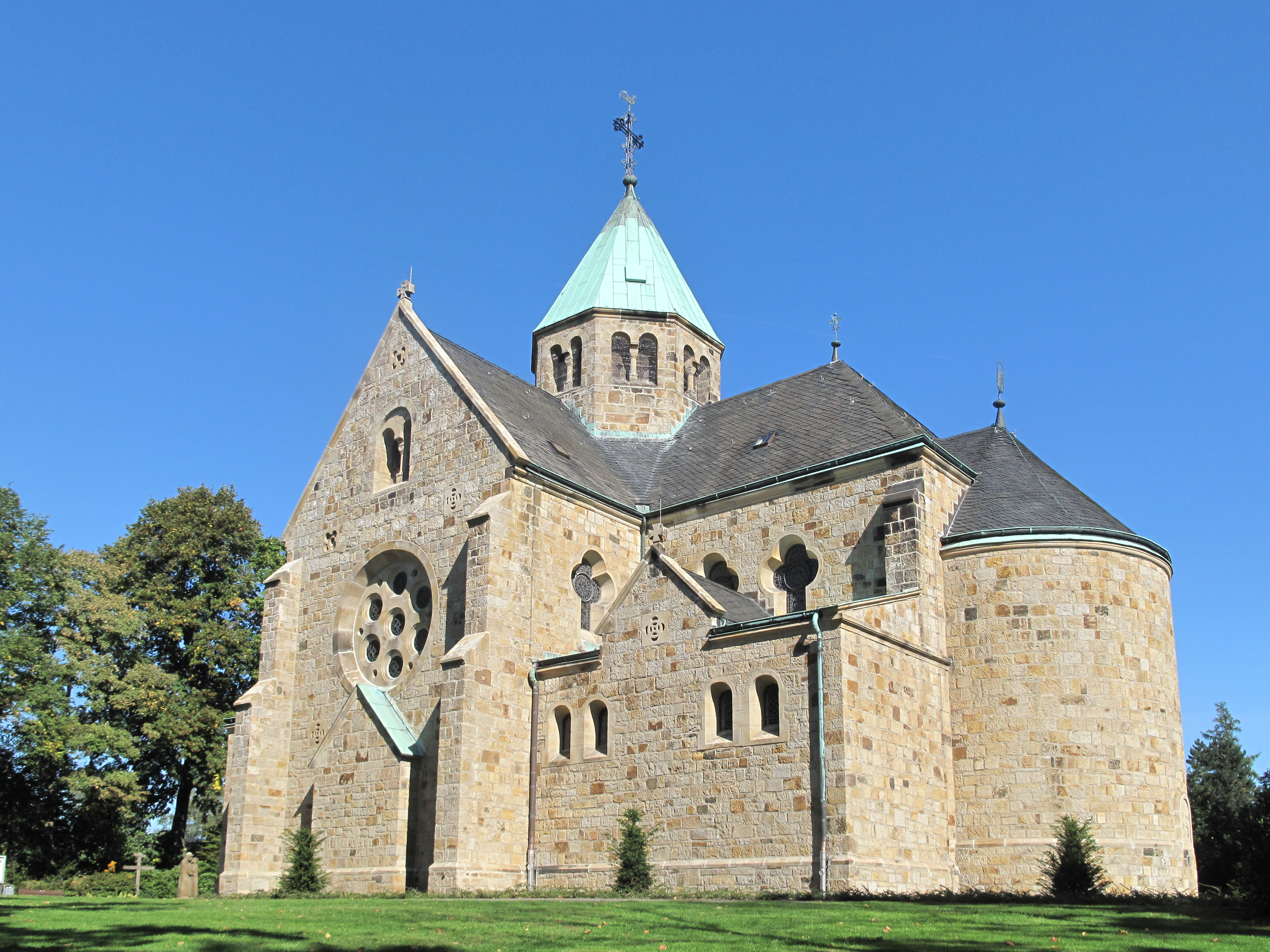
Catholic church in Hauenhorst

=== Early history ===
Although the region around the city has been populated since prehistoric times, Rheine was first mentioned in a document signed by Louis the Pious in 838. On 15 August 1327, it received its town charter from Louis II, Bishop of Münster.

The settlement was near to the crossing of two old merchant roads and a ford over the river Ems. Frankish soldiers initially secured this strategic point with a barrack yard. Later a church and more buildings were added to this outpost.

=== 17th – 19th centuries ===
At the end of the Thirty Years' War the city was burned down almost completely. Swedish and Hessian troops besieged imperial soldiers who had entrenched themselves in Rheine. On 20/21 September and 19 October 1647 glowing cannonballs set fire to the city and 365 houses were destroyed. In 1803 the city became the capital of the Sovereign Principality of Rheina-Wolbeck (556 square kilometers) of the House of Looz-Corswarem, later annexed by the Grand Duchy of Berg and the Kingdom of Prussia.

During the Industrial Revolution the textile industry prospered. It remained an important economic factor until the second half of the 20th century. Today engineering industries and services form the largest part of economy in Rheine.

=== 20th and 21st centuries ===
On 1 April 1927 about 10,000 inhabitants of the Office Rheine (Bentlage, Wadelheim, Dutum, etc.) were incorporated into the city, the population increased to 29,598, the city area was thus tripled.

During Nazi rule of Germany, Jewish citizens were deported from Rheine, as elsewhere in Germany. In the Second World War, Allied forces bombarded the city repeatedly, especially the railway line and the Dortmund-Ems Canal, which represented tactical goals. Large-scale bombing raids occurred on 5 October 1944 and 21 March 1945, each leaving more than 200 dead and causing extensive damage to the city area. The conquest of Rheine took place on 2 April 1945 after some fierce fighting by units of the 157th British Infantry Brigade (5th Battalion of the King's Own Scottish Borderers Regiment, 7th Battalion of the Cameronians (Scottish Rifles) Regiment).

After 1945, Rheine was in the British occupation zone and 1946 was politically assigned to the newly founded Land (state) of North Rhine-Westphalia. In 1949 it joined with the other states in the Western Zone to form the Federal Republic of Germany.

On 10 February 1946 Rheine was affected by the highest ever Emshochwasser. Large parts of the city were flooded.

On 15 August 2002 the city celebrated the 675th anniversary of the granting of municipal law.

== Division of the city ==
There is no standard division of the city, different divisions are used for different purposes. The districts do not form administrative units. A detailed breakdown includes 21 districts.

- Altenrheine
- Baarentelgen
- Bentlage
- Catenhorn
- Dorenkamp
- Dutum
- Elte
- Eschendorf
- Gellendorf
- Hauenhorst
- Hörstkamp
- Innenstadt (city centre)
- Kanalhafen
- Mesum
- Rodde
- Schleupe
- Schotthock
- Stadtberg
- Südesch
- Wadelheim
- Wietesch

The city of Rheine has eleven district advisory councils. For statistical purposes, there is a division into 18 statistical districts. The city is divided into 22 electoral districts.

Eschendorf, Dorenkamp, and Schotthock are the biggest districts by population, and Catenhorn is the smallest.

== Population ==
Historical population

Year	Pop.	±% p.a.
1965	65,482	—
1970	70,003	+1.34%
1975	71,542	+0.44%
1980	71,437	−0.03%
1985	70,666	−0.22%
1990	70,452	−0.06%
1995	74,587	+1.15%

Year	Pop.	±% p.a.
2000	75,886	+0.35%
2005	76,440	+0.15%
2010	76,530	+0.02%
2015	74,852	−0.44%
2020	76,123	+0.34%
2025	77,552	+0.37%

Source: Landesdatabank Nordrhein-Westfalen

== Politics ==
Peter Lüttmann of the Christian Democratic Union (CDU) has been the mayor of Rheine since 2015. The most recent mayoral election was held on 13 September 2020. Lüttmann was the sole candidate and was re-elected with 90.6% of votes in favour and 9.4% against, on a turnout of 48.5%.

=== List of mayors ===
- 1946–1948: Georg Pelster (1897–1963) (CDU)
- 1948–1954: Albert Biermann (CDU)
- 1954–1960: Balduin Echelmeyer (CDU)
- 1960–1961: Franz Rudolf Kümpers (CDU)
- 1961–1975: Albert Biermann (1903–1994) (CDU)
- 1975–1994: Ludger Meier (CDU)
- 1994–1999: Günter Thum (SPD)
- 1999–2004: Wilhelm Niemann (1949–2012) (CDU)
- 2004–2015: Angelika Kordfelder (born 1955) (SPD)
- since 2015: Peter Lüttmann

=== City council ===
The Rheine city council governs the city alongside the Mayor. The most recent city council election was held on 13 September 2020, and the results were as follows:

Party	Votes	%	+/-	Seats	+/-
Christian Democratic Union (CDU)	13,885	47.2	▲1.3	23	▲2
Social Democratic Party (SPD)	6,444	21.9	▼8.1	10	▼3
Alliance 90/The Greens (Grüne)	4,196	14.3	▲4.5	7	▲3
Free Democratic Party (FDP)	1,663	5.7	▲0.6	3	▲1
Independent Voters' Association Rheine (UWG)	1,380	4.7	▼0.3	2	±0
The Left (Die Linke)	993	3.4	▼0.8	2	±0
Citizens for Rheine (BfR)	873	3.0	New	1	New
Valid votes	29,434	98.3			
Invalid votes	498	1.7			
Total	29,932	100.0		48	▲4
Electorate/voter turnout	61,695	48.5	▲2.1		
Source: City of Rheine

The next city council elections will take place on September 14, 2025, with a possible runoff election scheduled for September 28, 2025.

== Transport ==
Westfalentarif

Rheine is the western terminus of the Münster-Rheine railway.

- Rheine railway station
- Rheine-Mesum

The city is served by Münster Osnabrück International Airport which is located 30 km (19 mi) north west of Rheine.

== Twin towns – sister cities ==
Rheine is twinned with:

- Borne, Netherlands (1983)
- Bernburg, Germany (1990)
- Leiria, Portugal (1996)
- Trakai, Lithuania (1996)

== Notable people ==
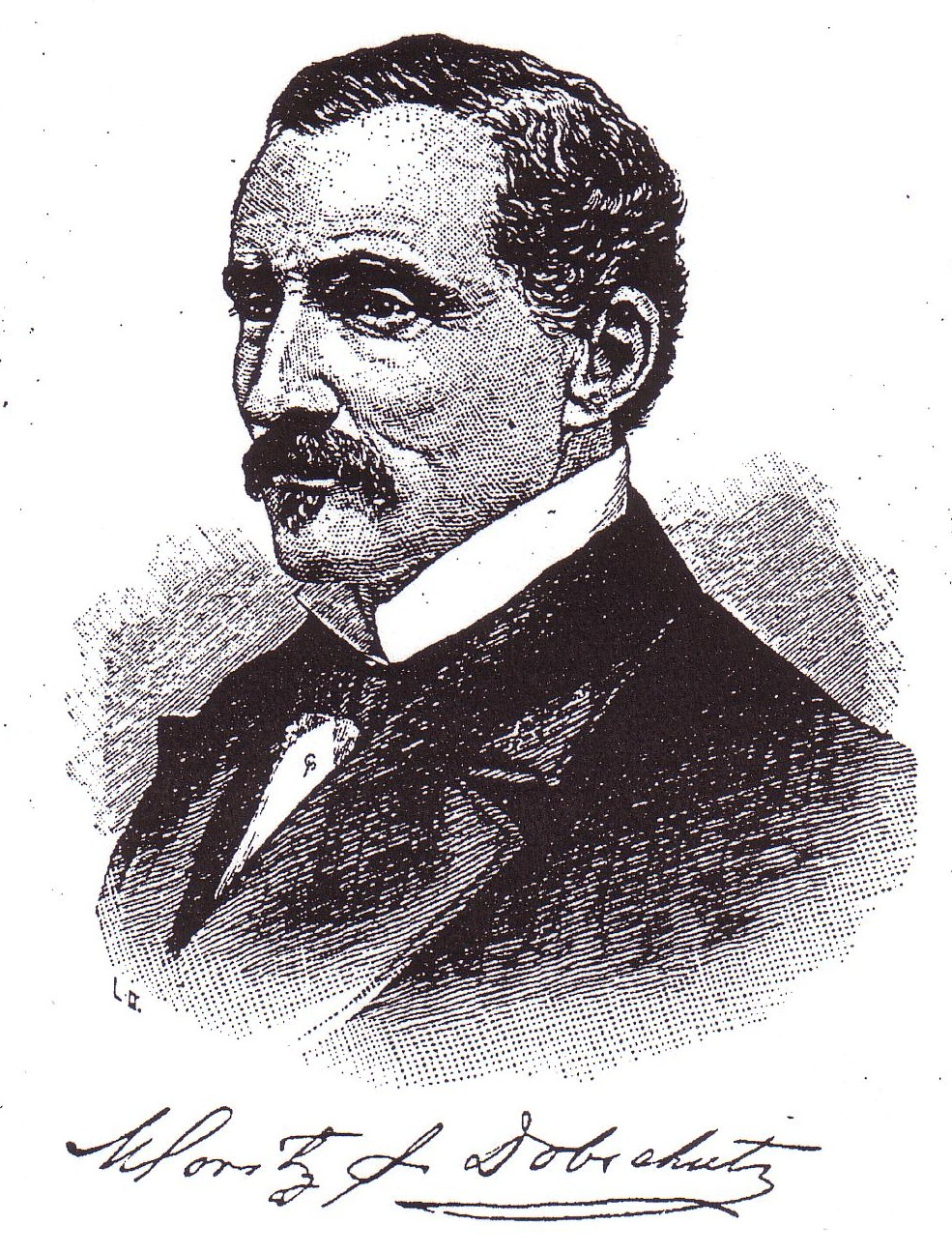
Moritz Julius Dobschütz

- Heinrich Meyring (1628–1723), German sculptor
- Moritz Dobschütz (1831–1913), German-American merchant
- Carl Murdfield (1868–1944), painter
- Josef Winckler (1881–1966), author
- Carlo Mense (1886–1965), painter
- Carl-Alfred Schumacher (1896–1967), military officer
- Georg Pelster (1897–1963), politician (CDU)
- Gustav Niemann (1899–1982), mechanical engineering scholar
- Josef Pieper (1904–1997), philosopher
- Rembert van Delden (1917–1999), politician (CDU)
- Josef Paul Kleihues (1933–2004), architect
- Harald Ibach (born 1941), physicist
- Frank Ripploh (1949–2002), actor
- Peter Funke (born 1950), historian
- Josef H. Neumann (born 1953), art historian and photographer
- Silvia Hildegard Haneklaus (born 1959), agricultural scientist
- Bettina Hoy (born 1962), equestrian
- Hildegard Müller (born 1967), politician
- Lisa Paus (born 1968), politician
- Michael Prus (born 1968), football player
- Oliver Krüger (born 1973), professor of religious studies
- Kerstin Stegemann (born 1977), footballer
- Jonas Reckermann (born 1979), beach volleyball player
- Julian Lüttmann (born 1982), football player
