= Illertissen =

- Town
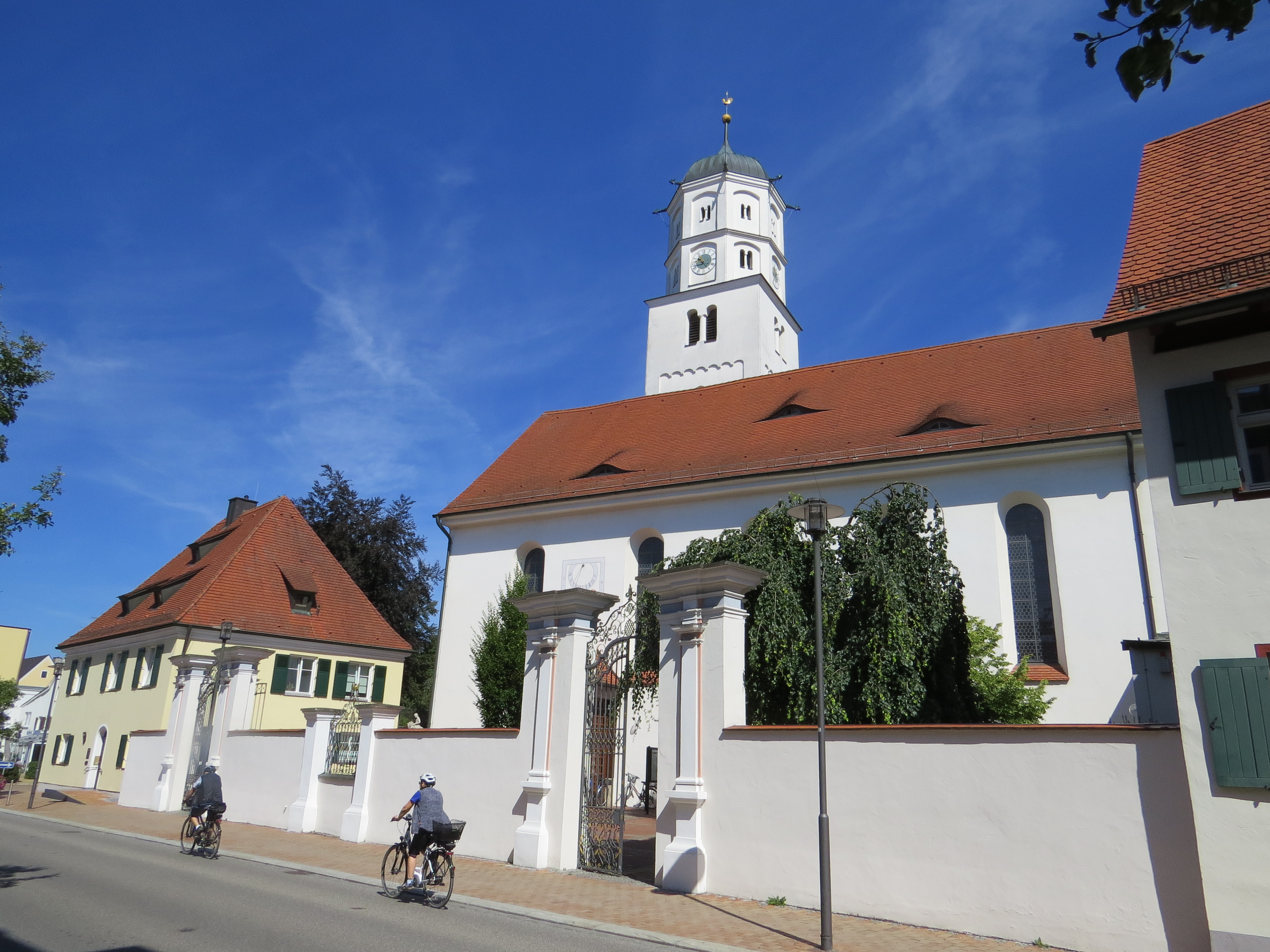
- Saint Martin Church

- Coat of arms

- Location of Illertissen within Neu-Ulm district
- Interactive map of Illertissen
- Location within Germany Location within Bavaria
- Coordinates: 48°13′N 10°05′E
- Country: Germany
- State: Bavaria
- Admin. region: Schwaben
- District: Neu-Ulm

Government
  - Mayor (2020–26): Jürgen Eisen (CSU)

Area
  - Total: 36.39 km^{2} (14.05 sq mi)
- Elevation: 513 m (1,683 ft)

Population (2025-12-31)
  - Total: 18,484
  - Density: 507.9/km^{2} (1,316/sq mi)
- Time zone: UTC+01:00 (CET)
  - Summer (DST): UTC+02:00 (CEST)
- Postal codes: 89257
- Dialling codes: 07303
- Vehicle registration: NU, ILL
- Website: www.illertissen.de

Illertissen (German: [ɪlɐˈtɪsn̩]) is a town in the district of Neu-Ulm in Bavaria. It is situated approximately 20 km south from Ulm adjacent to the river Iller.

== Coat of arms ==
The coat of arms lent by Erhard Vöhlin in the year 1530 shows an upright standing lion in red, covered by a black bar with three "P"s in silver capital letters. They stand for Pugnamus pro pace (from the Latin), meaning For peace we fight (not "Pugnamus pro Papa" which means "For the Pope we fight" as has been erroneously suggested).

== History ==
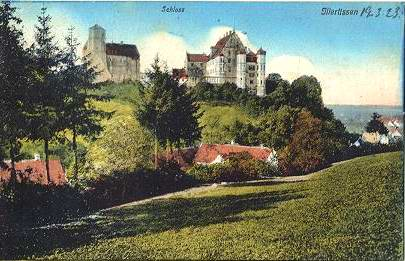
Vöhlinschloss 1923

The oldest evidence of settlement in Illertissen goes back to the beginning of the 6th century A.D. The first documented mention, with the name "Tussa", was in the year 954. That was on the occasion of the reconciliation by Ulrich, Bishop of Augsburg and the then bishop of Chur, King Otto I, and his son Duke Liudolf of Swabia. The occasion was a military alliance at Lechfeld, with the goal of preventing further penetrations by the Magyars. The three "P"s in the coat of arms may have originated from that event.

From the 12th century to the 13th century, the castle of Tissen was developed by the Counts of Kirchberg. Today, the castle is known as the Vöhlin château. By 1430, Kirchberg had become the seat of jurisdiction through Emperor Sigismund for the village of Tissen. From that time on, trade and handcraft blossomed in the region. Beside farmers and craftsmen in Illertissen, brewers and webbers were prominent. The trade house of the Vöhlin (1520-1757), a patrician family from Memmingen, heavily influenced the history of Illertissen. In the 18th century, the financial bankruptcy of the Vöhlin ended, and led to the sale of their rule to the Bavarian elector Maximilian III. in 1756. Since 1803, the château has been in the possession of the Bavarian state. It included accommodation for the pension offices, the district government, state parliament and treasury, and also the district court. Since 1983, the Bavarian Bee and Homeland museums have been accommodated in some formerly unused rooms.

An important development in the agrarian market was the opening of the Ulm - Oberstdorf railway line in 1861/62, the so-called Illertalbahn. Industries were established west of the line, and the number of inhabitants rose from 1,000 in 1800 to 2,500 in 1930. After the 1923 inflation crisis, the market municipality recovered in 1926, however a new crisis was to follow with the subsequent rise of the Nazi regime and World War II.

Three years after the war, the currency reorganization and the free-market economy led to an upswing like never before, and new industries emerged. Illertissen was able to industrialize without destroying the natural environment, social equilibrium or the skyline. In addition, post-war refugees made a remarkable contribution. In 1971, Betlinshausen was incorporated, and Au, Jedesheim and Tiefenbach were added in 1978, as part of a regional reorganization. Illertissen became a town with around 16,000 inhabitants.

With the district reorganization, the former district capital Illertissen had to deliver some offices to the district of Neu-Ulm, but Illertissen did not lose its economic integrity as a regional middle center in the south district.

== Main sights ==
- Vöhlin Castle, developed in the 12th and 13th century as the "Castle of Tissen" of the Counts of Kirchberg. In 1525-1756 it was a possession of the patrician family Vöhlin from Memmingen. It houses a Rococo chapel and a bee museum.
- Parish church St. Martin (1590), with high altar of the high renaissance, built by Christoph Rodt in 1604.
- Historical threshing floor (1847).
- City hall (1891).

== Transport ==
Illertissen is served by the Neu-Ulm-Kempten railway.

The nearest international airports are located in: Memmingen (35 km), Friedrichshafen (99 km), Stuttgart (106 km) and Munich (173 km).

== Twin cities ==
- Carnac, France
- Loket, Czech Republic

== Sons and daughters of the town ==
- Marc Forster (born 1969), film director
- Johannes A. Jehle (born 1961), biologist, insect virologist and phytophysician
- Reiner Knizia (born 1957), game scout
- Verena Sailer (born 1985), athlete
- Volker Ulrich (born 1975), politician (CSU)
