= Johannes Hallmann =

German agricultural scientist and phytomedicine specialist

Johannes Hallmann (born February 23, 1964, in Zeven, West Germany) is a German agricultural scientist of phytomedicine. He is a scientific adviser at the Julius Kühn-Institut, the Federal Research Institute for Cultivated Plants, the Institute for Epidemiology and Pathogen Diagnostics in Münster, the University Professor for Nematology and the President of the German Phytomedicine Society.

== Life and work ==
Johannes Hallmann studied agricultural sciences with a focus on plant production at the Rheinische Friedrich-Wilhelms-Universität Bonn. At this university, he was promoted in 1994, where he was also habilitated with Venia legendi in the field of plant diseases.

Research stays led him to the American Auburn University in Alabama, the Nuriootpa Research Center in Australia, and to Kenyatta University & ICIPE in Kenya. He also worked as a FAO consultant for Farmers Field School in Indonesia, at the Department of Plant and Microbial Biology at the Yezin Agricultural University, Myanmar, and the Twinning Project: Strengthening the Phytosanitary Inspection to Croatia and Ukraine.

Since 2005, he has been teaching at the Rheinische Friedrich-Wilhelms-Universität Bonn in the field of phytomedicine (areas: nematology and biological plant protection) as a lecturer. Since 2006, he has been a lecturer at the University of Kassel, from 2014 as Apl. Professor for the field of nematology in the Department of Ecological Agricultural Sciences. Since 2016, he has an additional professorship at the Humboldt-Universität zu Berlin in the field of phytomedicine.

== Membership and honorary positions ==
- 1991 till 1992 Graduiertenstipendium des Landes Nordrhein-Westfalen
- 1994 till 1996 Feodor-Lynen Stipendium der Alexander von Humboldt-Stiftung
- 1997 till 1999 Habilitationsstipendium der Deutschen Forschungsgemeinschaft
- 2002: Awarded with the Julius Kühn Prize for young scientists from the DPG

== Publications (selection) ==
- Books & Monographs
  - Hallmann, J., Keßler, J., Grosch, R., Schlathölter, M., Rau, F., Schütze, W., Daub, M. (2010). Biofumigation als Pflanzenschutzverfahren: Chancen und Grenzen. Berichte aus dem Julius Kühn-Institut, Heft 155, Saphir Verlag, pp. 102.
  - Hallmann, J., Quadt-Hallmann, A., von Tiedemann, A. (2009). Phytomedizin. Reihe Grundwissen Bachelor, 2. Auflage. Verlag Eugen Ulmer, ISBN 978-3-8001-2921-8, pp. 516.
  - Hallmann, J., Niere B. (2006). Aktuelle Beiträge zur Nematodenforschung. Mitt. a. d. Biol. Bundesanstalt Heft 404, ISBN 3-930037-25-4, pp. 94.
  - Hallmann, J. (2006). Pflanzenschutz im Ökologischen Landbau – Probleme und Lösungsansätze: Pflanzenparasitäre Nematoden. Berichte aus der Biologischen Bundesanstalt für Land- und Forstwirtschaft, Heft 131, Saphir Verlag, pp. 62.
  - Hallmann, J. (2003). Biologische Bekämpfung pflanzenparasitärer Nematoden mit antagonistischen Bakterien. Mitt. a. d. Biol. Bundesanstalt Heft 392, ISBN 3-930037-08-4, pp. 128.
- Articles in scientific Books
  - Hallmann, J., Kiewnick, S. (2015) Diseases caused by nematodes in organic agriculture. In: Finckh, M., van Bruggen, A.H., Tamm, L. Plant Diseases and their Management in Organic Agriculture. APS Press, St. Paul, MN, USA, 91-105.
  - Hallmann (2013). Nematoden als Schädlinge an Kulturpflanzen. In: Poehling, M, Verreet J.-A. (Hrsg.) Lehrbuch Phytomedizin. Ulmer Verlag, Stuttgart, 342-356.
  - Hallmann (2013). Tierische Schädlinge – Nematoda. In: Poehling, M, Verreet J.-A. (Hrsg.) Lehrbuch Phytomedizin. Ulmer Verlag, Stuttgart, 196-207.
  - Hallmann, J., Sikora, R.A. (2011). Endophytic fungi. In: Spiegel, Y., Davies, K. (Eds) Biological Control of plant parasitic nematodes: building coherence between microbial ecology and molecular mechanisms. Springer, Dordrecht, 227-258.Hallmann, J. (2000). Plant Interactions with Endophytic Bacteria. In: M.J. Jeger und N.J. Spence (Eds.) Biotic Interactions in Plant-Pathogen Associations, CABI Publishing, Wallingford, UK, pp. 87–119. DOI: 10.1079/9780851995120.0087.
  - Hallmann, J., Davies, K.G., Sikora, R. (2009). Biological control using microbial pathogens, endophytes and antagonists. In: Perry, R.N., Moens, M., Starr, J.L. (Eds) Root-knot nematodes. CABI Publishing, Wallingford, UK, pp. 380–411. DOI: 10.1079/9781845934927.0380.
  - Hallmann, J., Berg, G. (2006). Spectrum and population dynamics of bacterial root endophytes. In: Schulz, B., Boyle, C., Sieber, T. (Eds) Microbial Root Endophytes. Springer-Verlag, Berlin, 15-32.
  - Berg, G., Hallmann, J. (2006). Control of plant pathogenic fungi with bacterial endophytes. In: Schulz, B., Boyle, C., Sieber, T. (Eds) Microbial Root Endophytes. Springer-Verlag, Berlin, 53-70.
  - Hallmann, J., Berg, G, Schulz, B. (2006). Isolation procedures for endophytic bacteria. In: Schulz, B., Boyle, C., Sieber, T. (Eds) Microbial Root Endophytes. Springer-Verlag, Berlin, 299-320.
  - Hooper, D.J., Hallmann, J., Subbotin, S. (2005). Methods for Extracting and Detection of Plant and Soil Nematodes. In: M. Luc, R.A. Sikora, J. Bridge (Eds.) Plant Parasitic Nematodes in Subtropical and Tropical Agriculture, 2nd Edition, CABI Publishing, Wallingford, UK, 53-86. DOI: 10.1079/9780851997278.0053.
  - Hommes, M., Schrameyer, K., Fischbach, M., Hallmann, J. (2006). Schadorganismen im Freilandgemüsebau. In: Kühne, S., Burth, U., Mary, P. (Eds) Biologischer Pflanzenschutz im Freiland – Pflanzengesundheit im ökologischen Landbau. Eugen Ulmer KG, 108-174.
