= Moritz Dobschutz =

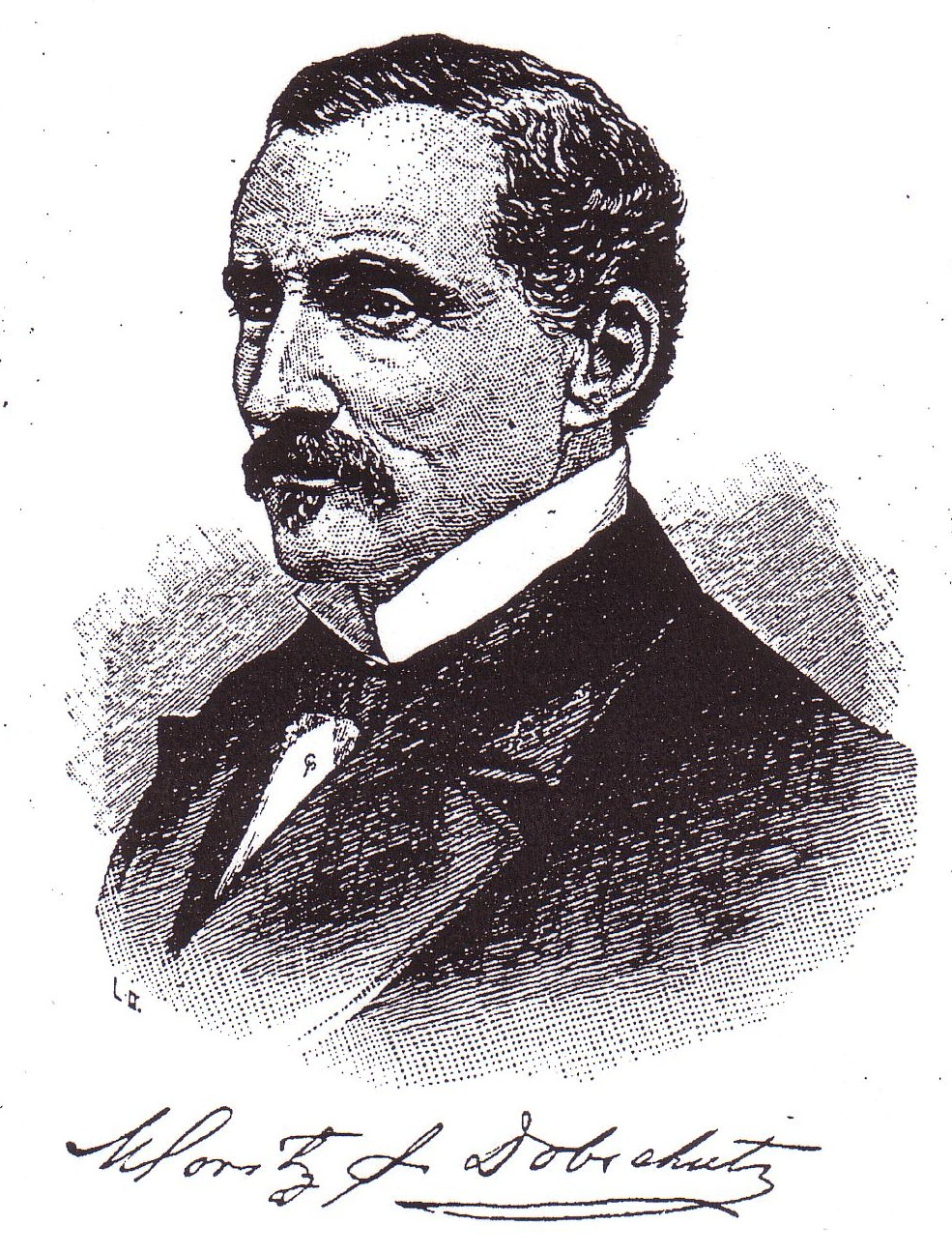
Moritz J. Dobschutz in 1881 (Source: History of St. Clair County, 1881)

Moritz J. Dobschutz (born Moritz Julius von Dobschütz; March 20, 1831 – June 24, 1913) was a German-American merchant.

== Biography ==
Moritz Dobschutz was born in Rheine, Kingdom of Prussia on March 20, 1831. A member of German nobility, he immigrated into the United States in 1856 and became a very prosperous merchant in Belleville, Illinois. He died at his home there on June 24, 1913.

His home in Belleville, a Victorian adaptation of a Greek revival house built in 1866, is now used by the Victorian Home Museum and by the St. Clair County Historical Society.
