= Jan Zadoks =

Dutch botanist

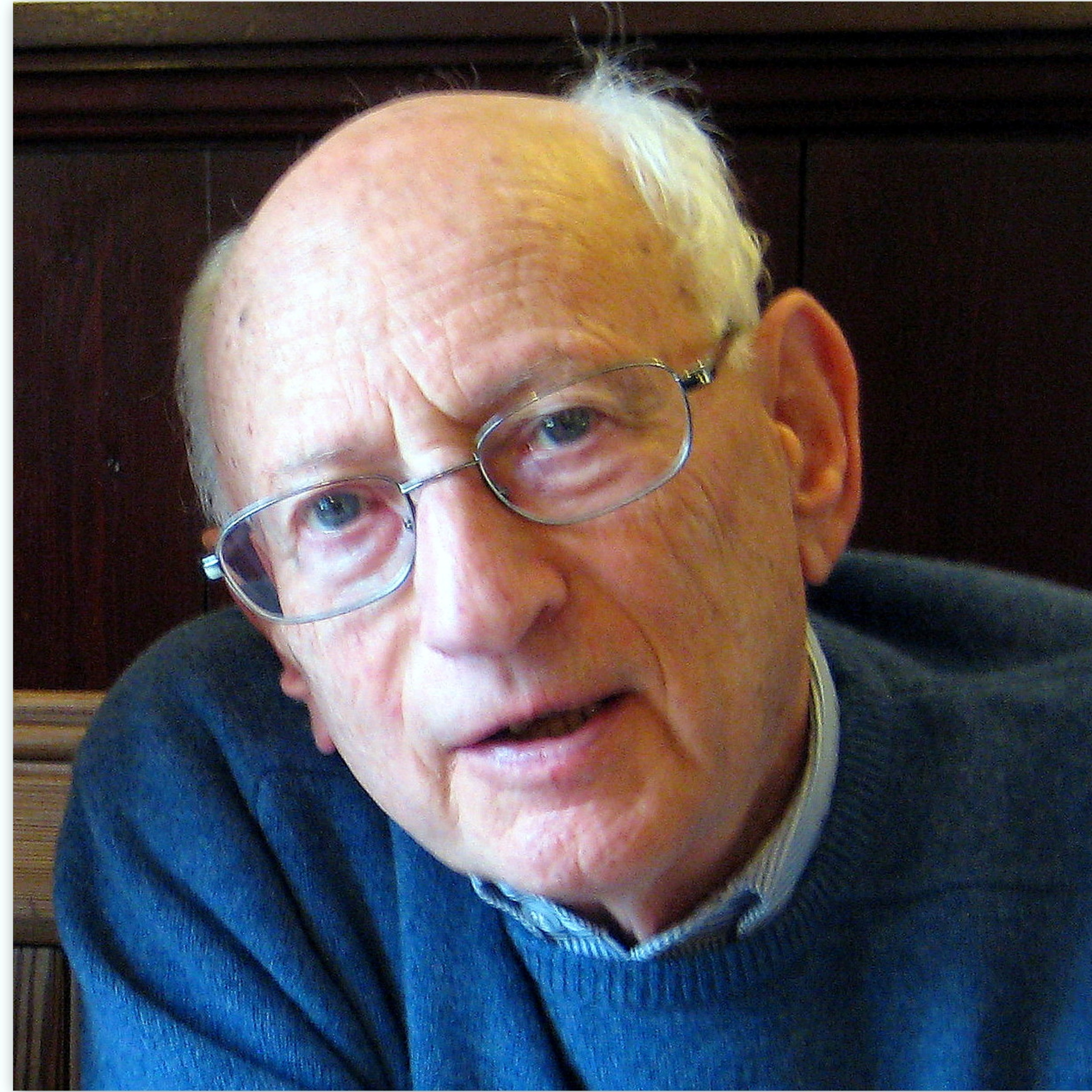
- Jan Zadoks, 2012
- Born: Jan Carel Zadoks; 6 February 1929 (age 97); Amsterdam, Netherlands
- Citizenship: Dutch
- Education: University of Amsterdam
- Known for: Plant disease epidemiology, research on wheat stripe rust in cereal
- Scientific career
- Workplaces: Wageningen University & Research
- Doctoral advisor: prof. dr. A.J.P. Oort

Jan Carel Zadoks (born 6 February 1929) is a Dutch botanist and a professor emeritus of ecological plant pathology at Wageningen University & Research.

== Career ==
Zadoks studied biology at the University of Amsterdam and received his PhD. cum laude from the same university in 1961 for his thesis Yellow rust on wheat, studies in epidemiology and physiologic specialization.

In 1961 Zadoks joined the National Agricultural College, where he was appointed Professor of Ecological Plant Pathology in 1969. He served in various administrative roles, including Dean of the School of Agriculture, and President of the Biology Section (BION) of the Dutch Research Council (Dutch: Nederlandse Organisatie voor Wetenschappelijk Onderzoek, NWO). He was a member of the Committee on Genetic Modification (COGEM) of the Netherlands ('GMO Release Committee'), chairing the Subcommittee on Plants for five years. He was a member of the Netherlands Pesticides Registration Board for 3 years.

Zadoks developed what is arguably the world's first course on plant disease epidemiology with a wet lab and field practical. He pioneered courses in 'Aerobiology', 'Crop Loss', 'Genetics of Resistance' and 'Plant Protection and Society'. The first course formed the basis of the textbook 'Epidemiology and plant disease management'.

Zadoks retired in 1994.

=== Research on cereal rust epidemiology ===
His early research focused on wheat yellow stripe rust and other fungal plant diseases. His 1974 scale to record growth stages of cereals (the 'Zadoks scale') became the internationally recognized standard as used by the Food and Agriculture Organization of the United Nations (FAO) and the International Union for the Protection of New Varieties of Plants (UPOV). He developed dynamic simulation models of plant disease epidemics, and initiated the computerized pest and disease warning system EPIPRE for wheat. Later, he became involved in various studies of focus formation in plant disease, and in alternative agriculture. Once retired, he published on the history of plant pathology.

=== International agricultural outreach ===
In 1969, Zadoks founded the European and Mediterranean Cereal Rust Foundation. He performed consultancy and evaluation missions for the United Nations Food and Agriculture Organization (FAO), CGIAR (Consultative Group for International Agriculture) and for Dutch, French and Swiss governmental institutions with a focus on crop loss, resistance, integrated pest management (IPM) and education. For 14 years he was a member of the FAO Panel of Experts for Integrated Pest Control. He organised the XIII International Plant Protection Congress (IPPC) of the International Association for the Plant Protection Sciences at The Hague in 1995.

== Collection of Sinterklaas wrapping papers ==
In addition to his academic work in plant pathology, Zadoks collected 1500 items of Sinterklaas-themed wrapping paper over a period of 50 years, and wrote about the themes and changes in their design in his publication Sinterklaas verpakt - Vijftig jaar Sint Nicolaas inwikkelpapier (translates as: "Sinterklaas wrapped - Fifty years of Sinterklaas wrapping paper"). One of Zadoks' conclusions is that the portrayal of Sinterklaas' blackface companion, Zwarte Piet, has undergone significant metamorphoses from 1960-2010.

== Awards and honours ==
Year	Award / Honour
1979	Adventurers in Agricultural Science Award of Distinction (at the International Plant Protection Congress (IPPC) by the International Association for the Plant Protection Sciences, Washington)
1980	Officer in the Order of Orange Nassau
1993	Knight in the Order of the Netherlands Lion
1994	Fellow of the American Phytopathological Society
2002	Biannual Award of the Royal Netherlands Phytopathological Society
2005	Honorary Doctorate in agriculture from the Swedish University of Agricultural Sciences
2012	Honorary Life Membership of the International Association of Plant Protection Societies (IAPPS)
2016	Honorary Membership of the Royal Netherlands Phytopathological Society

== Publications ==
=== Scientific works ===
- 1979 - Epidemiology and plant disease management (ISBN 9780195024517) - with R.D. Schein
- 2005 - Sea lavender, rust and mildew. A perennial pathosystem in the Netherlands (ISBN 9789076998596)
- 2008 - On the political economy of plant disease epidemics. Capita selecta in historical epidemiology (ISBN 9789086860869)
- 2013 - Crop protection in medieval agriculture. Studies in pre-modern organic agriculture (ISBN 9789088901874)
- 2014 - Black shank of tobacco in the former Dutch East Indies, caused by Phytophthora nicotianae (ISBN 9789088902833)

=== Other works ===
- Sinterklaas verpakt - Vijftig jaar Sint Nicolaas inwikkelpapier [Fifty years of Sinterklaas wrapping paper] (in Dutch). Utrecht: Zadoks. 2010. p. 127. ISBN 9789081112574.
- Ter lering van de kinderen - Een opvoedkundig werkje uit de 18e eeuw [Lessons for children. An educational booklet from the 18th century] (in Dutch). Utrecht: Zadoks. 2021. p. 76. ISBN 9789492649119. This book is a translation of On Civility in Children (French: La civilité puerile et honneste pour l’instruction des enfans; Latin: De civilitate morum puerilium) by Erasmus, translated by Zadoks, with an introduction by Zadoks.

== Literature ==
- Dekker, J. (1993). "Jan Carel Zadoks, Professor in ecological Plant Pathology: Wageningen Agricultural University". Netherlands (European) Journal of Plant Pathology. 99 (Supplement 3): 7–18. Bibcode:1993EJPP...99....7D. doi:10.1007/BF03041391. S2CID 30242439.
