= Gabriele Berg =

Biologist, biotechnologist and lecturer

Gabriele Berg (born 1963) is a biologist, biotechnologist and university lecturer in Environmental and Ecological Technology at the Technical University of Graz. Her research emphasis is on the development of sustainable methods of plant vitalisation with Bioeffectors and molecular analysis of microbial processes in the soil, particularly in the Rhizosphere.

== Life and work ==
She was born in Potsdam, East Germany in 1963. After graduating from the Helmholtz-Gymnasium, Potsdam in 1981 Frau Berg studied biology at the University of Rostock. She graduated with honours (1986) and then spent a research study year in Microbiology and Biotechnology at the University of Greifswald. In 1995 she obtained the qualification Dr. rer nat with "magna cum laude" and in 2001 the Venia Legendi for Microbiology with her dissertation Antagonistic Micro-organisms. In 2003 she was awarded a Heisenberg-Stipendium by the Deutschen Forschungsgemeinschaft (German Research Community). In 2005 she became the first female professor of natural science at the Graz University of Technology.

== Memberships and affiliations ==
- Senate of the TU Graz
- International Verticillium Steering Committee
- Austrian Society for Biomedical Engineering (ÖGBMT), Vorsitz der Sektion Süd
- Deutsche Phytomedizinische Gesellschaft (DPG – German Phytomedical Society), chairperson of the working group Biologische Bekämpfung (Biological Control, 2004–2012)
- Editorial Board FEMS Microbial Ecology (2000–2010), MPMI, ISME Journal (2007–)

== Field of interest ==
Frau Berg's research is focused on the environmental biotechnology, in particular the development of sustainable biotechnological methods to improve the microbiological performance potential of soil that has been intensively used for agriculture, and for biological plant protection with plant fortifiers and Biostimulants.

== Awards ==
- Science2Business Award Austria
- ÖGUT Umweltpreis
- Fast Forward Award Styria

== Publications ==
Gabriele Berg has been an author on 289 publications which have been cited 31,000 times; her h-index is 92 (As of 2021), there follows a small selection of this literature.

- Berg, Gabriele; Roskot, Nicolle; Steidle, Anette; Eberl, Leo; Zock, Angela; Smalla, Kornelia (2002). "Plant-Dependent Genotypic and Phenotypic Diversity of Antagonistic Rhizobacteria Isolated from Different Verticillium Host Plants". Applied and Environmental Microbiology. 68 (7). American Society for Microbiology: 3328–3338. Bibcode:2002ApEnM..68.3328B. doi:10.1128/aem.68.7.3328-3338.2002. ISSN 0099-2240. PMC 126805. PMID 12089011.
- Berg, Gabriele; Eberl, Leo; Hartmann, Anton (2005). "The rhizosphere as a reservoir for opportunistic human pathogenic bacteria". Environmental Microbiology. 7 (11). Wiley: 1673–1685. doi:10.1111/j.1462-2920.2005.00891.x. ISSN 1462-2912. PMID 16232283.
- Lottmann, Jana; Heuer, Holger; Smalla, Kornelia; Berg, Gabriele (1999). "Influence of transgenic T4-lysozyme-producing potato plants on potentially beneficial plant-associated bacteria". FEMS Microbiology Ecology. 29 (4). Oxford University Press (OUP): 365–377. doi:10.1111/j.1574-6941.1999.tb00627.x. ISSN 0168-6496.
- Smalla, K.; Wieland, G.; Buchner, A.; Zock, A.; Parzy, J.; Kaiser, S.; Roskot, N.; Heuer, H.; Berg, G. (2001). "Bulk and Rhizosphere Soil Bacterial Communities Studied by Denaturing Gradient Gel Electrophoresis: Plant-Dependent Enrichment and Seasonal Shifts Revealed". Applied and Environmental Microbiology. 67 (10). American Society for Microbiology: 4742–4751. Bibcode:2001ApEnM..67.4742S. doi:10.1128/aem.67.10.4742-4751.2001. ISSN 0099-2240. PMC 93227. PMID 11571180.
- Opelt, Katja; Berg, Christian; Schönmann, Susan; Eberl, Leo; Berg, Gabriele (19 July 2007). "High specificity but contrasting biodiversity of Sphagnum-associated bacterial and plant communities in bog ecosystems independent of the geographical region". The ISME Journal. 1 (6). Springer Science and Business Media LLC: 502–516. doi:10.1038/ismej.2007.58. ISSN 1751-7362. PMID 18043652. S2CID 14746362.
- Müller, Henry; Westendorf, Christian; Leitner, Erich; Chernin, Leonid; Riedel, Kathrin; Schmidt, Silvia; Eberl, Leo; Berg, Gabriele (2009). "Quorum-sensing effects in the antagonistic rhizosphere bacterium Serratia plymuthica HRO-C48" (PDF). FEMS Microbiology Ecology. 67 (3). Oxford University Press (OUP): 468–478. doi:10.1111/j.1574-6941.2008.00635.x. ISSN 0168-6496. PMID 19220861.
- Grube, Martin; Cardinale, Massimiliano; de Castro, João Vieira; Müller, Henry; Berg, Gabriele (25 June 2009). "Species-specific structural and functional diversity of bacterial communities in lichen symbioses". The ISME Journal. 3 (9). Springer Science and Business Media LLC: 1105–1115. doi:10.1038/ismej.2009.63. ISSN 1751-7362. PMID 19554038. S2CID 12316908.
- Ryan, Robert P.; Monchy, Sebastien; Cardinale, Massimiliano; Taghavi, Safiyh; Crossman, Lisa; Avison, Matthew B.; Berg, Gabriele; van der Lelie, Daniel; Dow, J. Maxwell (2009). "The versatility and adaptation of bacteria from the genus Stenotrophomonas". Nature Reviews Microbiology. 7 (7). Springer Science and Business Media LLC: 514–525. doi:10.1038/nrmicro2163. ISSN 1740-1526. PMID 19528958. S2CID 1969926.
- Bragina, Anastasia; Berg, Christian; Berg, Gabriele (2015). "The core microbiome bonds the Alpine bog vegetation to a transkingdom metacommunity". Molecular Ecology. 24 (18). Wiley: 4795–4807. doi:10.1111/mec.13342. ISSN 0962-1083. PMID 26335913. S2CID 206182543.
- Mahnert, Alexander; Moissl-Eichinger, Christine; Berg, Gabriele (28 August 2015). "Microbiome interplay: plants alter microbial abundance and diversity within the built environment". Frontiers in Microbiology. 6. Frontiers Media SA: 887. doi:10.3389/fmicb.2015.00887. ISSN 1664-302X. PMC 4552223. PMID 26379656.
