= Rembert van Delden =

German politician (1917–1999)

Member of the Bundestag
- In office 17 October 1961 – 13 December 1976

Personal details
- Born: 3 April 1917 Rheine
- Died: 5 February 1999 (aged 81) Ahaus, North Rhine-Westphalia, Germany
- Party: CDU

Rembert van Delden (3 April 1917 – 5 February 1999) was a German politician of the Christian Democratic Union (CDU) and former member of the German Bundestag.

== Life ==
From 1956 van Delden was a member of the CDU. Van Delden had been a council member of the Ammeln municipality since 1959. He was a member of the German Bundestag from 1961 to 1976. He had always entered parliament via the state list of the CDU North Rhine-Westphalia.

== Literature ==
Herbst, Ludolf; Jahn, Bruno (2002). Vierhaus, Rudolf (ed.). Biographisches Handbuch der Mitglieder des Deutschen Bundestages. 1949–2002 [Biographical Handbook of the Members of the German Bundestag. 1949–2002] (in German). München: De Gruyter - De Gruyter Saur. p. 1715. ISBN 978-3-11-184511-1.
