= Holger B. Deising =

German agricultural scientist (born 1956)

Holger Bruno Deising (born 18 October 1956) is a German agricultural scientist specialising in Phytomedicine and president of the German Phytomedicine Society.

== Life and work ==
Born in Krummsee, Ostholstein, Germany, Deising attended primary and grammar school in Kronshagen and Kiel, and passed the school-leaving examinations in 1975, after which he did military service (1975–1976).

He completed his studies at Kiel University with a Diploma in Agricultural Engineering, after which he worked as a Biology Assistant at the same university (1982–1987), ending with a dissertation entitled Physiological and biochemical investigations on nitrate reduction in the bryophyte Sphagnum. Deising then moved to the Institute of Pathology and Constance University (1988 bis 1996), where he gained a Professorship with Venia Legendi for Plant Physiology and Phytomedicine in 1996 with the subject Biochemical investigation of differentiation of infection structures of the broad bean rust fungus Uromyces viciae-fabae.

== Books edited ==
- Dehne, H.W, Deising, H.B., Gisi, U., Kuck, K.H., Russell, P.E. (Eds.) 2008, Modern Fungicides and Antifungal Compounds V, DPG Spektrum Phytomedizin, DPG Selbstverlag. ISBN 978-3-941261-02-0.
- Deising, Holger B. (Ed.), The Mycota, Vol. 5, Plant Relationships, 2nd ed., 2009, Approx. 390 p. 96 illus., 24 in color., Hardcover, ISBN 978-3-540-87406-5. https://www.springer.com/life+sci/microbiology/book/978-3-540-87406-5 (in press).
