= Gustav Niemann =

- Born: 9 February 1899
- Died: 1 January 1982 (aged 82); Munich
- Occupation: Engineer; mechanical engineer
- Awards: Grashof Commemorative Medal (1966)
- Academic career
- Doctoral advisor: Otto Kammerer, Heinrich Aumund

Gustav Niemann (Rheine, 9 February 1899 – Munich, 1 January 1982) was a mechanical engineering professor who is regarded as an expert in machine elements.

== Biography ==
Niemann studied mechanical engineering at the Technische Hochschule Darmstadt from 1919 to 1923. In 1928 he was promoted at the Technische Hochschule Berlin with the doctoral dissertation Über Wippkrane mit wagrechtem Lastwippweg (On Tower Cranes with Horizontal Load Yield). He taught at the Technische Hochschule from 1934 to 1950, and at the Technische Hochschule München from 1951 to 1968. He was a recipient of the Grashof medal from the Verein Deutscher Ingenieure and the E. P. Connell medal from the American Gear Manufacturers Association, and was also an honorary member of the Japanese Society of Mechanical Engineers. Niemann was married to Marie-Luise (née Plaßmann, 1910 – 1987); the couple did not have any children.

== Bibliography ==
- Niemann, Gustav; Hirt, Manfred: Maschinenelemente. Springer, Berlin 1975, 1983. ISBN 0-387-06809-0.
  - Volume 1: Konstruktion und Berechnung von Verbindungen, Lagern, Wellen
  - Volume 2: Getriebe allgemein, Zahnradgetriebe - Grundlagen, Stirnradgetriebe
  - Volume 3: Schraubrad-, Kegelrad-, Schnecken-, Ketten-, Riemen-, Reibradgetriebe, Kupplungen, Bremsen, Freiläufe
