= Julius Kühn-Institut =

German agricultural research institute

Julius Kühn-Institut (JKI)
- Federal Research Centre for Cultivated Plants; Bundesforschungsinstitut für Kulturpflanzen
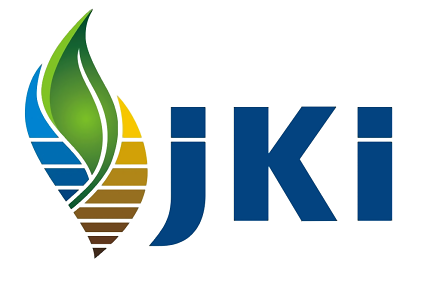

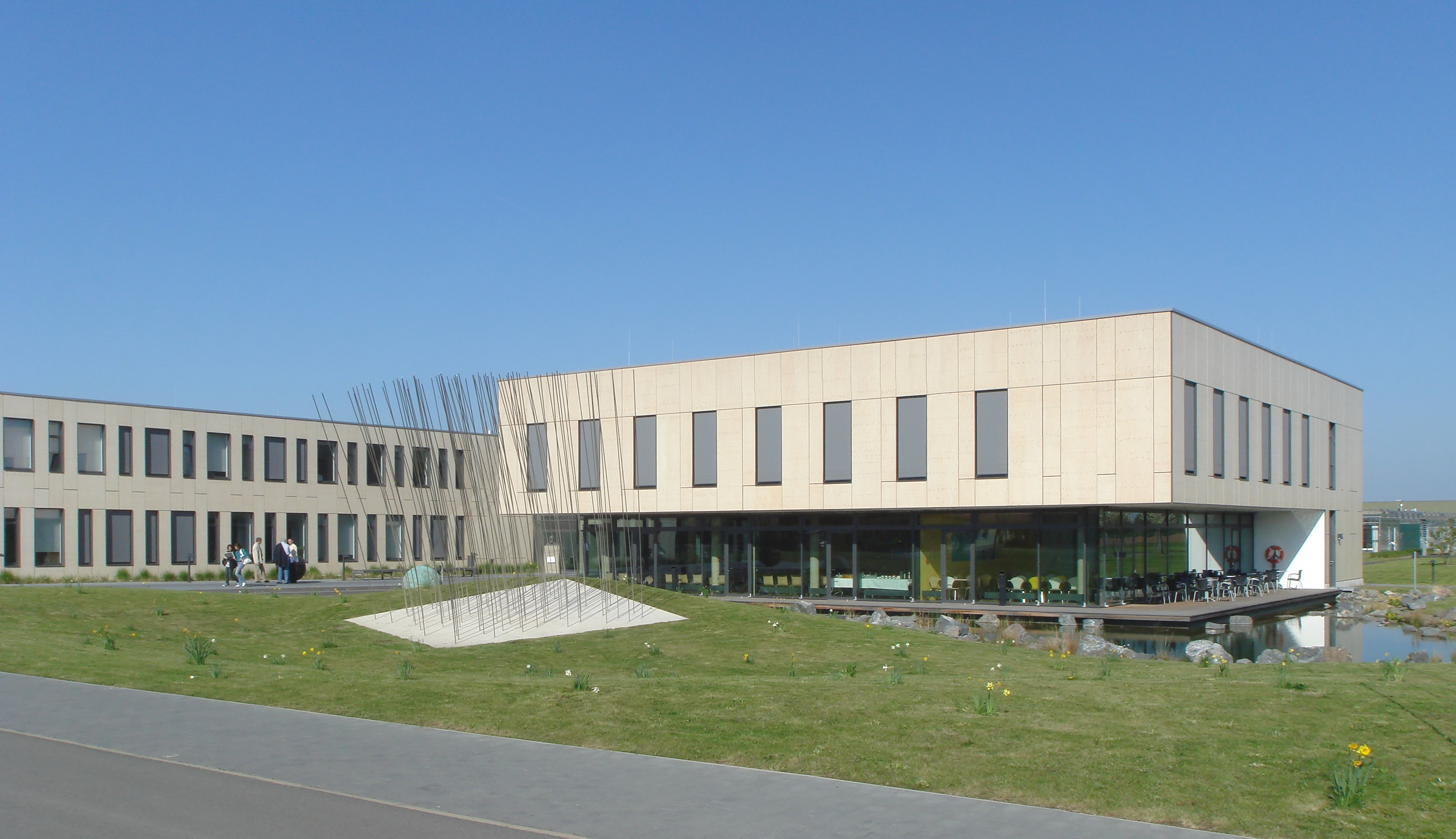
- Headquarters building in Quedlinburg

Agency overview
- Formed: January 2008
- Headquarters: Quedlinburg, Germany; 51.7728°N 11.1436°E
- Employees: 1,200
- Agency executive: Frank Ordon, President
- Parent agency: Federal Ministry of Food and Agriculture
- Website: https://www.julius-kuehn.de/en/

Julius Kühn-Institut – Bundesforschungsinstitut für Kulturpflanzen (JKI) is the German Federal Research Centre for Cultivated Plants. It is a federal research institute and a higher federal authority divided into 15 specialized institutes. Its objectives, mission and research scope were determined by section 11, paragraph 57 of the 1987 Federal Law on the Protection of Cultivated Plants as subsequently amended.

The JKI was named after the German agricultural scientist Julius Kühn (1825–1910). It was formed in January 2008 when three research centres in the Federal Ministry of Food and Agriculture merged:

- Federal Biological Research Centre for Agriculture and Forestry (BBA),
- Federal Institute for Plant Breeding Research on crops (BAZ) and
- Federal Agricultural Research Centre (FAL) (two institutes)

It has its main office at Quedlinburg and centres at Berlin, Braunschweig, Darmstadt, Dossenheim, Dresden-Pillnitz, Elsdorf, Groß Lüsewitz, Kleinmachnow, Münster and Siebeldingen.

== Institutes ==
- Epidemiology and Pathogen Diagnostics (Quedlinburg and Braunschweig)
- Ecological Chemistry, Plant Analysis and Stored Product Protection (Quedlinburg, Berlin and Kleinmachnow)
- Resistance Research and Stress Tolerance (Quedlinburg)
- Biosafety in Plant Biotechnology (Quedlinburg)
- Breeding Research on Horticultural and Fruit Crops (Quedlinburg and Dresden)
- Breeding Research on Agricultural Crops (Quedlinburg)
- Application Techniques in Plant Protection (Braunschweig)
- Crop and Soil Science (Braunschweig)
- National and International Plant Health (Braunschweig)
- Plant Protection in Field Crops and Grassland (Braunschweig)
- Plant Protection in Horticulture and Forests (Braunschweig and Münster)
- Strategies and Technology Assessment (Berlin and Kleinmachnow)
- Biological Control (Darmstadt)
- Plant Protection in Fruit Crops and Viticulture (Dossenheim, Siebeldingen, Bernkastel-Kues)
- Grapevine Breeding Geilweilerhof (Siebeldingen)
- Experimental station for potato breeding (Groß Lüsewitz)

== Notable people ==
The facility is headed by breeding researcher Frank Ordon. He succeeded the horticultural and phytomedical scientist Georg F. Backhaus, who had previously been head of the Federal Biological Institute in Berlin and Braunschweig since 2002.

- Georg F. Backhaus (born 1955), agricultural scientist
- Heinz Butin (1928–2021), phytopathologist and forest scientist
- Falko Feldmann (born 1959), biologist and phytomedicine specialist
- Gregor Hagedorn (born 1965), botanist
- Johannes Hallmann (born 1964), agricultural scientist and phytomedicine specialist
- Andreas Hensel (born 1961), veterinarian, microbiologist and hygienist
- Johannes A. Jehle (born 1961), biologist, insect virologist and phytomedical scientist
- Peter Morio (1887–1960), agronomist and vine grower
- Frank Ordon (born 1963), agricultural scientist
- Ewald Schnug (born 1954), agricultural scientist, university lecturer and researcher
- Kornelia Smalla (born 1956), chemist and biotechnologist
- Hermann Stegemann (1923–2018), Professor of Biochemistry
- Rolf Tippkötter (born 1946), soil scientist
