= Georg F. Backhaus =

German professor

Georg Friedrich Backhaus (born 1955 in Freienhagen, Hessen, Germany) is a German agricultural scientist specializing in horticulture and phytomedicine. Since 2008 he has been president of the Julius Kühn-Institut (JKI) with headquarters in Quedlinburg.

== Life and work ==
After taking his school-leaving exams at the Alten Landesschule, Korbach, in 1973 he took up studies in Biology and Social Sciences at the Comprehensive University of Kassel. After military service he further studied horticulture at the University of Hannover (1975-1980).

After obtaining a diploma in agricultural engineering Herr Backhaus worked for a Ph. D. as a scientist at the Institute for Plant Disease and Plant Protection at the same university. He obtained the qualification Dr. rer. hort. in 1984 with a dissertation entitled: Untersuchungen zur Nutzung der endotrophen (VA) Mykorrhiza in der gärtnerischen Pflanzenproduktion. Studies on the use of the endotrophs (VA) Mykorrhiza in horticulture. His supervisor for this work was Prof. Dr. Fritz Schoenbeck.

After working abroad as a post-doc at the Institute of Forestry-Mycology and –Pathology at the Swedish Agricultural University, Uppsala he completed an internship at the Landespflanzenschutzamt Rheinland-Pfalz (Rheinland-Pfalz Plant Protection Agency), leading to the 2nd State Examination.

In 1986 Dr. Backhaus took over as director of the Department of Plant Protection in Horticulture at the Provincial Chamber of Agriculture in Weser-Ems. In 1993 he moved to the Biologischen Bundesanstalt für Land- und Forstwirtschaft (Federal Biology Institute of Agriculture and Forestry) in Braunschweig, taking over as Director and Professor of the Institut für Pflanzenschutz im Gartenbau (Institute of Plant Protection in Horticulture):

He was appointed President of the Biologischen Bundesanstalt für Land- und Forstwirtschaft (BBA, see above) in Braunschweig in 2002. After re-organising and amalgamating various provincial research institutions he was appointed Professor and President of the Julius Kuehn-Institute.

== Involvement and honours ==
- Georg F. Backhaus Publisher of the Journal of Horticultural Crops
- Georg Backhaus Organiser of Meetings on Phytomedicine
- Thaer-Medal for Georg F. Backhaus pdf
