= Johannes A. Jehle =

German biologist, insect virologist, and phytophysician

Johannes A. Jehle (born 1961, Illertissen, West Germany) is a German scientist for insect virology, and plant protection. The focus of his research is the use of microorganisms and viruses for biological control of insect pests and the development of sustainable methods for plant protection. He heads the Institute for Biological Plant Control of the Julius Kühn-Institut in Darmstadt and is an adjunct Professor at the Technical University Darmstadt. He was President of the Society of Invertebrate Pathology in 2016/2018.

== Education ==
Jehle attended secondary school Kolleg der Schulbrueder in Illertissen, from where he graduated in 1980. After studying biology at LMU Munich and the University of Göttingen with an emphasis on botany, phytopathology, and statistics he undertook a six-month field study on indigenous medicinal plants and healing methods in West Africa. From 1989 to 1993, he completed postgraduate studies in plant protection at the University of Göttingen and worked on his thesis "Safety Aspects of Genetic Engineering: the Relationships and Variability of the Genomes of Cryptophlebia leucotrata granulovirus and des Cydia pomonella granulovirus" at the Centre for Agriculture and Forestry in Braunschweig. He obtained the doctoral degree Dr. rer. nat. in 1994 from the Technical University of Braunschweig.

== Research ==
From 1994 to 1996 he was Marie-Curie Fellow at the Department of Virology of Wageningen University (the Netherlands) working with Prof. J. M. Vlak, before he moved to the plant protection service of the state of Rhineland-Palatinate. From 1997 to 2009 he headed the research group Biotechnological Plant Protection at the Agricultural Service Centre in Neustadt an der Weinstrasse, where he addressed safety issues related to genetic engineering of maize and grapes and improved methods for biological plant protection using microorganisms and insect viruses. Since 2010 he is director of the Institute for Biological Control of the Julius Kuehn Institute in Darmstadt. In 2006, he obtained a postdoctoral degree (Dr. habil.) of Genetics at the University of Mainz, and since 2012 he is adjunct Professor at the TU Darmstadt.

Jehle's scientific work aims to investigate, develop, and evaluate methods of biological control for organic and integrated farming. His research focus is on insect viruses, their classification and phylogeny, their use as biological plant protection agents, and research into baculovirus resistance. In 2008 he was honored for this work by the Society of Invertebrate Pathology with the Founders´ Lecturer Award. The results of this research culminated in over 200 scientific papers and book contributions.

== Publications (selection) ==
- Jehle, Johannes A.; Nickel, Antje; Vlak, Just M.; Backhaus, Horst (1998). "Horizontal Escape of the Novel Tc1-Like Lepidopteran Transposon TCp3.2 into Cydia pomonella Granulovirus". Journal of Molecular Evolution. 46 (2). Springer Science and Business Media LLC: 215–224. Bibcode:1998JMolE..46..215J. doi:10.1007/pl00006296. ISSN 0022-2844. PMID 9452523. S2CID 22563982.
- Lange, Martin; Jehle, Johannes A. (2003). "The genome of the Cryptophlebia leucotreta granulovirus". Virology. 317 (2). Elsevier BV: 220–236. doi:10.1016/s0042-6822(03)00515-4. ISSN 0042-6822. PMID 14698662.
- Jehle, Johannes A.; Lange, Martin; Wang, Hualin; Hu, Zhihong; Wang, Yongjie; Hauschild, Rüdiger (2006). "Molecular identification and phylogenetic analysis of baculoviruses from Lepidoptera". Virology. 346 (1). Elsevier BV: 180–193. doi:10.1016/j.virol.2005.10.032. ISSN 0042-6822. PMID 16313938.
- Jehle, J. A.; Blissard, G. W.; Bonning, B. C.; Cory, J. S.; Herniou, E. A.; Rohrmann, G. F.; Theilmann, D. A.; Thiem, S. M.; Vlak, J. M. (2 May 2006). "On the classification and nomenclature of baculoviruses: A proposal for revision". Archives of Virology. 151 (7). Springer Science and Business Media LLC: 1257–1266. doi:10.1007/s00705-006-0763-6. ISSN 0304-8608. PMID 16648963. S2CID 6293565.
- Asser-Kaiser, S.; Fritsch, E.; Undorf-Spahn, K.; Kienzle, J.; Eberle, K. E.; Gund, N. A.; Reineke, A.; Zebitz, C. P. W.; Heckel, D. G.; Huber, J.; Jehle, J. A. (28 September 2007). "Rapid Emergence of Baculovirus Resistance in Codling Moth Due to Dominant, Sex-Linked Inheritance". Science. 317 (5846). American Association for the Advancement of Science (AAAS): 1916–1918. Bibcode:2007Sci...317.1916A. doi:10.1126/science.1146542. ISSN 0036-8075. PMID 17901332. S2CID 39636105.
- Nguyen, H. T.; Jehle, J. A. (2007). "Quantitative analysis of the seasonal and tissue-specific expression of Cry1Ab in transgenic maize Mon810". Journal of Plant Diseases and Protection. 114 (2). Springer Science and Business Media LLC: 82–87. doi:10.1007/bf03356208. ISSN 1861-3829. S2CID 89552679.
- Wang, Yongjie; Bininda-Emonds, Olaf R. P.; van Oers, Monique M.; Vlak, Just M.; Jehle, Johannes A. (6 March 2011). "The genome of Oryctes rhinoceros nudivirus provides novel insight into the evolution of nuclear arthropod-specific large circular double-stranded DNA viruses". Virus Genes. 42 (3). Springer Science and Business Media LLC: 444–456. doi:10.1007/s11262-011-0589-5. ISSN 0920-8569. PMID 21380757. S2CID 17691779.
- Lacey, Lawrence (2012). Manual of techniques in invertebrate pathology. Oxford New York: Academic Press imprint of Elsevier Science. ISBN 978-0-12-386899-2. OCLC 789131580.
- Gebhardt, M. M.; Eberle, K. E.; Radtke, P.; Jehle, J. A. (20 October 2014). "Baculovirus resistance in codling moth is virus isolate-dependent and the consequence of a mutation in viral gene pe38". Proceedings of the National Academy of Sciences. 111 (44): 15711–15716. Bibcode:2014PNAS..11115711G. doi:10.1073/pnas.1411089111. ISSN 0027-8424. PMC 4226074. PMID 25331863.
- Sauer, Annette J.; Fritsch, Eva; Undorf-Spahn, Karin; Nguyen, Petr; Marec, Frantisek; Heckel, David G.; Jehle, Johannes A. (22 June 2017). Lopez-Ferber, Miguel (ed.). "Novel resistance to Cydia pomonella granulovirus (CpGV) in codling moth shows autosomal and dominant inheritance and confers cross-resistance to different CpGV genome groups". PLOS ONE. 12 (6) e0179157. Public Library of Science (PLoS). Bibcode:2017PLoSO..1279157S. doi:10.1371/journal.pone.0179157. ISSN 1932-6203. PMC 5480857. PMID 28640892.
