= Falko Feldmann =

German biologist and phytomedicinist

Falko Feldmann (born 1959 in Goslar, West Germany) is a German biologist and practitioner of phytomedicine. He is coordinator of matters concerning approval and registration of active substances and agents for plant protection, including international cooperation on questions about European Plant Protection Laws. He also holds the post of director of the Deutschen Phytomedizinischen Gesellschaft e.V. (DPG, German Phytomedical Society) and is involved in a number of organisations and committees relevant to plant protection.

== Life and work ==
Herr Feldmann studied biology at Braunschweig Technical University and gained a Diploma in Botany, Zoology, Microbiology and Soil Science. He expanded his expertise in the area of mycorrhizal fungi, which was grounded in his diploma work, through research visits to Gainesville, Florida, the Universidade Federal de Viçosa, Brazil, and the Rubber Research Centre (as it then was) of Embrapa, Manaus, in the Amazon area of Brazil. He obtained the qualification Dr. rer. nat. with a dissertation entitled The Mycorrhiza of the rubber tree Hevea spec. Müell. Arg.: Occurrence at natural sites and in plantations, effect on resistance reaction and utilisation in plantations at Braunschweig University.

From 1991 to 1996 he was a C1 Professor at the Institut für Angewandte Botanik (Institute of Applied Botany) at Hamburg University, and was coordinator of a German-Brazilian project aimed at recultivating abandon locations in areas of the Amazon basin. In parallel, he and his group further developed the biotechnical requisites for successful inoculation with mycorrhizal fungi in European horticulture.

From 1996 until 2001 he worked as a scientist at the Institut für Pflanzenkultur (Institute of Plant Culture) in Solkau (Germany) where he was involved in a number of research projects such as the practically-oriented production of mycorrhizal fungi in horticulture, stinging nettle culture, in vitro culture of shrubs and cultivation of endangered medicinal plants.

In 2001 Feldmann moved to the present Institut für Pflanzenschutz im Gartenbau und Forst (Institute of Horticultural and Forestry Plant Protection) in Braunschweig as a scientist, at first in the research department of the BMEL, later coordinating the evaluation and registration of plant protection agents and products and their alternatives. He was here again responsible for issues concerning the certification of production processes in horticulture and agriculture and for agricultural ethics.

In parallel, Feldmann has been the Director of the Deutschen Phytomedizinischen Gesellschaft e.V. (German Phytomedical Society, DPG) since 2003. He organises numerous meetings over the whole area of phytomedicine – generally together with various partners in the DPG such as the JKI and Humboldt University. Among the regular meetings are the international Symposia of Plant protection and Plant Health in Europe (PPPHE), the International Urban Plant Conferences (IUPC) and the German Plant Protection Conference. Many meetings on special topics and Working Groups of the DPG are supported. He is Publications Manager of the DPG publishers in Braunschweig (publishers of the journals Phytomedicine and Phytomedicine Spectrum).

His most important scientific achievement was the first quantitative genetic description of the species-inherent variability of mycorrhizal fungi inoculum and the development of a method to regulate the selection-dependent loss of efficacy during the course of fungal reproduction (Directed Inoculum Production Process, DIPP). Further, he described the key role of arbuscular mycorrhizal fungi in the re-cultivation of degraded areas of soil in tropical areas of the Amazon basin.

His methodology could be applied for sustainable re-cultivation of abandoned areas and represented a decisive contribution to the prevention of further deforestation. His organisational efforts towards the networking of the DPG are aimed at the interdisciplinary and transdisciplinary integration of the many and varied fields of phytomedicine for scientific, advisory and horticultural practice.

== Commitments ==
Involvement in the development of national and international regulations, guidelines, and norms for quality control systems for horticulture as a basis for management of agricultural ethics.

Integration of biological plant protection procedures and other alternatives to plant protection agents in the Management Committee of COST Action 870, involvement in FA 1103. Coordination of cooperative research projects with foreign partners in the area of plant protection and symbiosis.

Short term advisory work for domestic and international questions concerning integrated plant protection (including research and twinning projects), certification and approval of plant protection agents.

Organisation of numerous meetings over the whole area of phytomedicine, normally together with partners from the DPG, such as the JKL and Humboldt University. Regular meetings include particularly the international Symposia for Plant Protection and Plant Health in Europe (PPPHE), the International Urban Plant Conferences (IUPC) and the international German Plant Protection Meeting. In addition, meetings on special topics are supported.

== Memberships (selection) ==
- Deutsche Phytomedizinische Gesellschaft e.V. (German Phytomedical Society, DPG): Geschäftsführer, Stellvertretender (director, deputy director)
- Head of the DPG Working Group Microbial Symbiosis. Phytomedicine in Urbancology and Phytomedicine in the Tropics and Sub-Tropics.
- Arbeitsgemeinschaft für Tropische und Subtropische Agrarforschung (ATSAF: Study Group on Tropical and Sub-Tropical Agricultural Research): Head of Section “Biotic Stresses” at the meeting at the Tropics Meeting.
- International Association for Plant Protection Sciences (IAPPS): Congress Managing Director International Plant Protection Congress 2015
- Counselling Braunschweig: Committee Member
- Round Table Together in Braunschweig: Spokesman in the Working Group of Braunschweig City
- Member of the Advisory Board for the Disabled Braunscheig e.V. (BBS)

== Selected publications ==
- 2012: Integrierter Pflanzenbau – ein zukunftsfähiges Konzept für nachhaltiges Handeln in der Pflanzenproduktion. In: Meier, U. (Hrsg.): Agrarethik. Agrimedia. ISBN 978-3-86263-078-3, S. 191–210. (Integrated Plant Cultivation – a Concept for Sustainable Trade in Horticulture in the Future)
- Feldmann, F.; Grotkass, C. (2002). "Directed inoculum production – shall we be able to design populations of arbuscular mycorrhizal fungi to achieve predictable symbiotic effectiveness?". Mycorrhizal Technology in Agriculture. Basel: Birkhäuser Basel. doi:10.1007/978-3-0348-8117-3_21. ISBN 978-3-0348-9444-9.
- Feldmann, F., 1998: The Strain – Inherent Variability of Arbuscular Mycorrhizal Effectiveness: II. Effectiveness of single spores Symbiosis, 25, 131–143.
- Feldmann, F., Idczak, E., Martins, G., Nunes, J., Gasparotto, L., Preisinger, H., Moraes, V.H.F., Lieberei, R., 1995: Recultivation of degraded, fallow lying areas in central Amazonia with equilibrated polycultures: Response of useful plants to inoculation with VA-mycorrhizal fungi. Angewandte Botanik, 69, 111–118.
- Further Citations from the Literaturliste Feldmann-Lifesience
