= Federal Agricultural Research Centre =

Former German research institute

Coordinates: 52°17′30″N 10°26′27″E

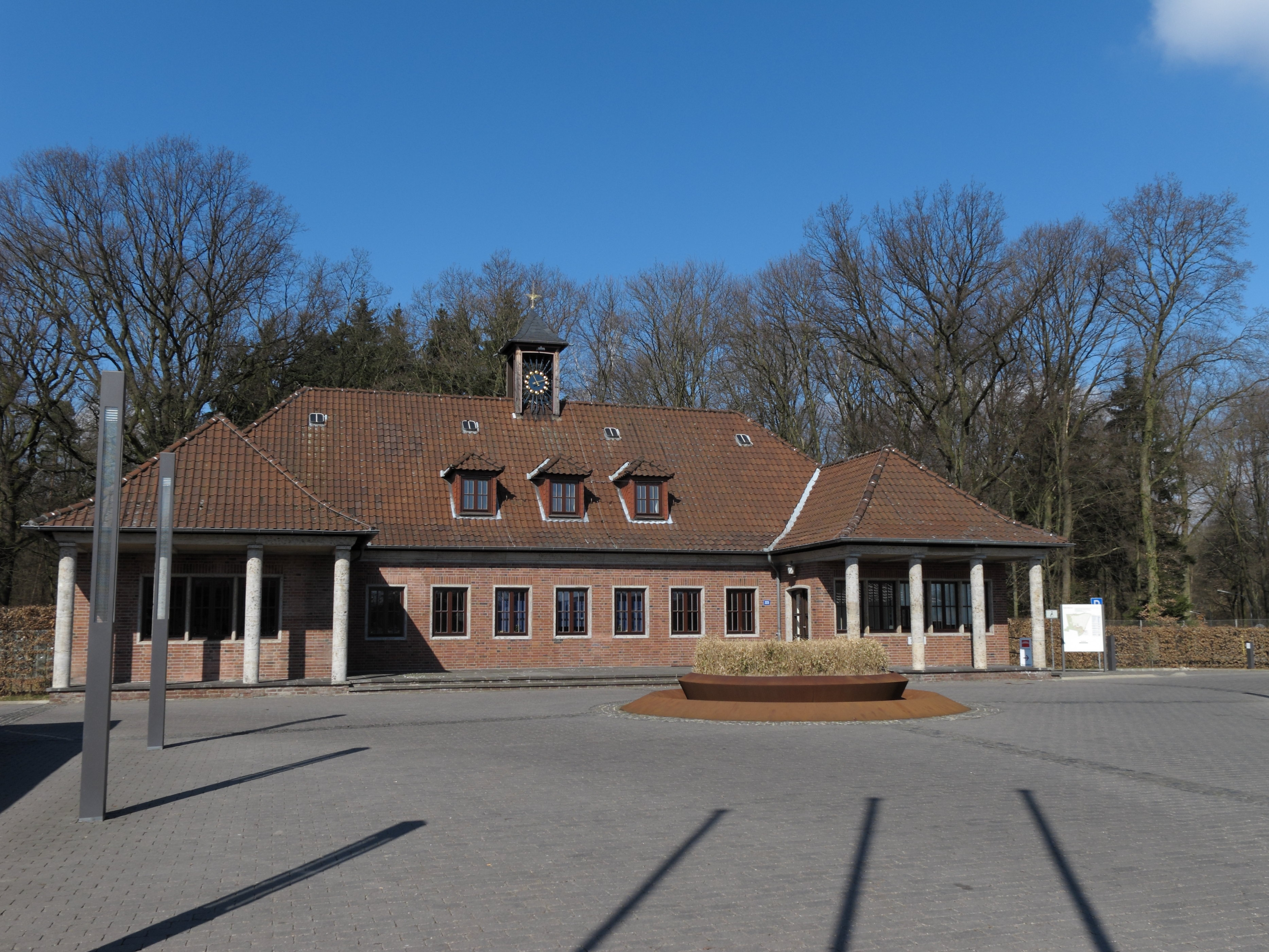
Braunschweig, main gate

The Federal Agricultural Research Center (FAL) (German: Bundesforschungsanstalt für Landwirtschaft), headquartered in Braunschweig, was a federal authority of the Federal Ministry of Food, Agriculture and Consumer Protection. On January 1, 2008, FAL was split into the Johann Heinrich von Thünen Institute, the Julius Kuehn Institute and the Friedrich Loeffler Institute.

The Federal Research Institute for Agriculture was divided into four areas:

- Soil / Plant (Plant Nutrition and Soil Science, Agronomy and green agriculture, agro-ecology)
- Animal (animal nutrition, animal husbandry, animal welfare and animal husbandry)
- Technology (technology and biosystems, engineering and Construction)
- Agricultural Economics (Business Administration, Rural areas, market and agricultural trade policy)

There was also a Institute of Organic Farming in Westerau.

== Institutes ==
- Institute for Plant Nutrition and Soil Science in Braunschweig
- Institute for Crop and Green Agriculture in Braunschweig
- Institute for Agricultural Ecology in Braunschweig
- Institute for organic farming in Westerau
- Institute for Animal Welfare and Animal Husbandry in Celle
- Institute for Animal Nutrition in Braunschweig
- Institute for Animal Breeding in Mariensee (Neustadt am Rübenberge)
- Institute for Technology and Biosystems in Braunschweig
- Institute of Industrial Technology and Construction in Braunschweig
- Institute of Management in Braunschweig
- Institute for Rural Studies in Braunschweig
- Institute for Market Analysis and Agricultural Trade Policy in Braunschweig
