= Balak (disambiguation) =

Balak was a Biblical king of Moab.

Balak may also refer to:

== Surname ==
- Abdullah Balak (born 1938), Turkish composer
- Emre Balak (born 1988), Turkish footballer

== First name or alias ==
- Belek Ghazi, 12th-century Turkish emir
- Alias of Ali Waheed (born 1984), Maldivian politician
- Alias of French cartoonist Yves Bigerel
- Balak Singh (1797–1862), Indian Sikh religious leader

== Places ==
- Balak, Armenia, in Syunik Province
- Balak, Kurdistan, a village in Kurdistan Province, Iran
- Balak Island, Malaysia

== Other ==
- Balak (parsha), a section of the Hebrew bible
- Balak tribe, a Kurdish tribe
- Bałak, a sociolect of the Polish language
- Operation Balak, 1948 undercover operation to smuggle aircraft from Eastern Europe to Israel
- Balak-Palak, a 2013 Indian film

== See also ==
- Balaka (disambiguation)
