= Balik =

Balik may refer to:

- Balik (name)
- Balik (ruler) (died 1347), Bulgarian

Toponyms:

- Balik, Azerbaijan
- Balik, Iran
- Balık, lake in Turkey

Ethnic groups:

- Balik people, a minority ethnic group inhabiting Sepaku and Balikpapan, East Kalimantan

== See also ==
- Balyk (disambiguation)
- Balika Badhu (disambiguation)
