= Faculty of Tropical AgriSciences =

- Fakulta tropického zemědělství
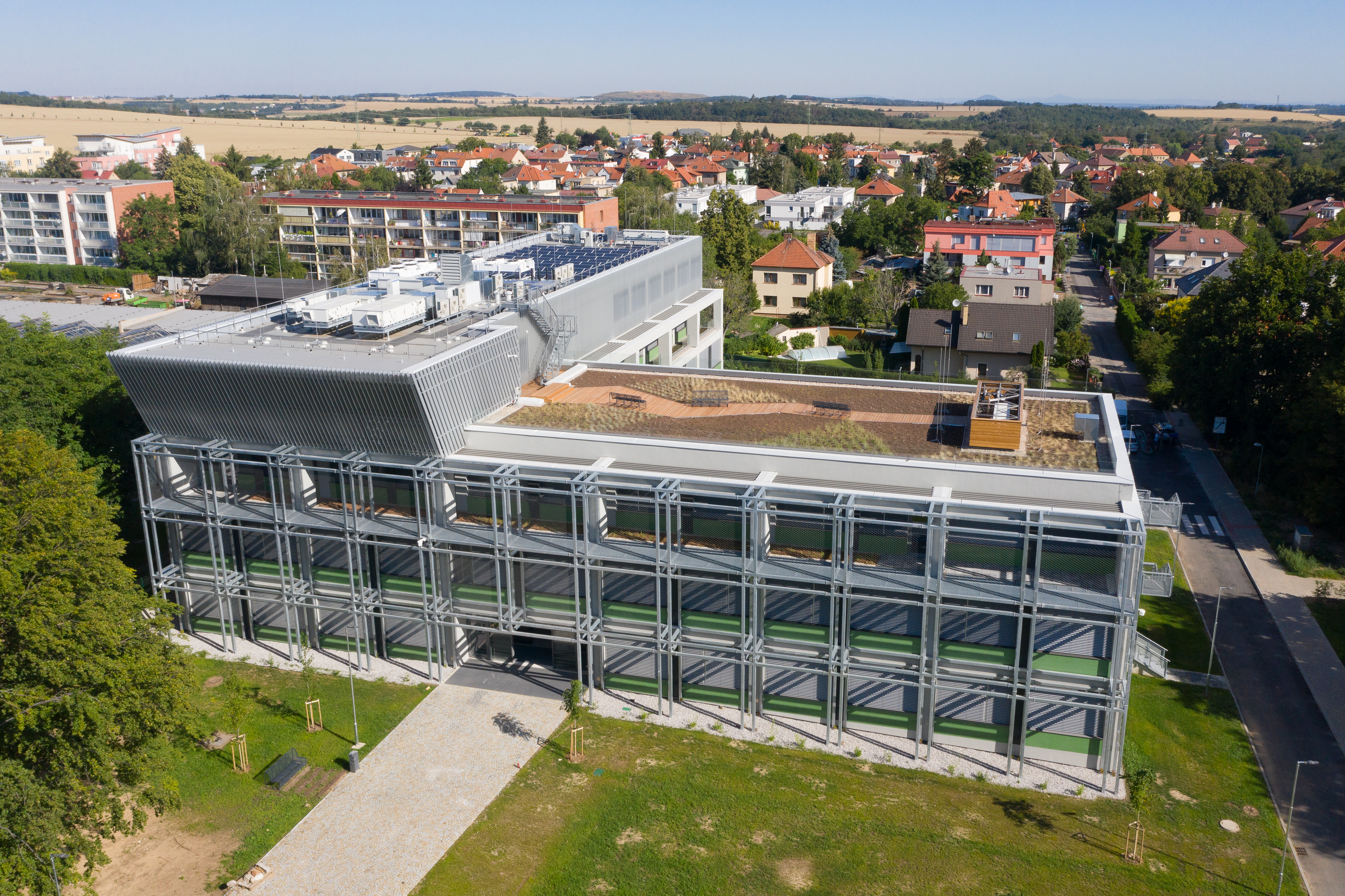
- Type: Public
- Location: Prague, Czech Republic; 50°7′48″N 14°22′34″E
- Campus: Prague-Suchdol
- Website: https://www.ftz.czu.cz/en/

The Faculty of Tropical AgriSciences (FTZ) (Czech: Fakulta tropického zemědělství; FTZ) is a part of the Czech University of Life Sciences Prague (CZU). The Faculty was established in 2013 by the transformation of the Institute of tropics and subtropics (ITS). The current dean is Assoc. Prof. Dr. Hynek Roubík. The previous dean was Prof. Patrick Van Damme who became the second dean of the Faculty of Tropical AgriSciences (FTZ) but the first dean ever as a foreign national in the history of the Czech Republic (not counting deans from Slovakia). The Faculty is located in the campus of the CZU in Prague, the Czech Republic.

The main mission of the FTZ is education of students and publication of research results in the field of agriculture, rural development and sustainable management of natural and energy resources in the tropics and subtropics.

Motto of the faculty, initiated by Assoc. Prof. Hynek Roubík, since 2025 is: "Leading Excellence in Tropical AgriSciences"

== History ==
The history of the faculty starts in 1961 when the "Department of World Agriculture and Forestry" was established at the Faculty of Forestry, University of Agriculture in Prague. In 1967, the department was transformed to the Institute of Tropical and Subtropical Agriculture as a part of Faculty of Economics and Management of the University of Agriculture in Prague. The Institute becomes independent institution of the university in 1991 and changed the name to Institute of Tropics and Subtropics in 2005. In 2013, the Faculty Tropical AgriSciences was established by the decision of the academic senate of the Czech university of Life Sciences Prague.

=== Directors of the Institute ===
- prof. MVDr. Jaroslav Červenka, CSc. (1965–1972)
- prof. Ing. František Pospíšil, CSc. (1972–1977)
- doc. Ing. Jiří Jára, CSc. (1977–1987)
- prof. Ing. Jiří Havel, CSc. (1987–1989)
- doc. MVDr. Jiří Houška, CSc. (1990–1991)
- prof. Ing. Jan Bláha, CSc. (1991–1995)
- doc. Ing. Karel Otto, CSc. (1996–2000)
- prof. Ing. Bohumil Havrland, CSc. (2000-2012)
- prof. Ing. Jan Banout, Ph.D. (2012-2013)

=== Deans ===
- prof. Ing. Jan Banout, Ph.D. (2013 - 2021)
- prof. dr. ir. Patrick Van Damme (2021-2025)
- Assoc. prof. Dr. Hynek Roubík (since 2025)

== Structure ==
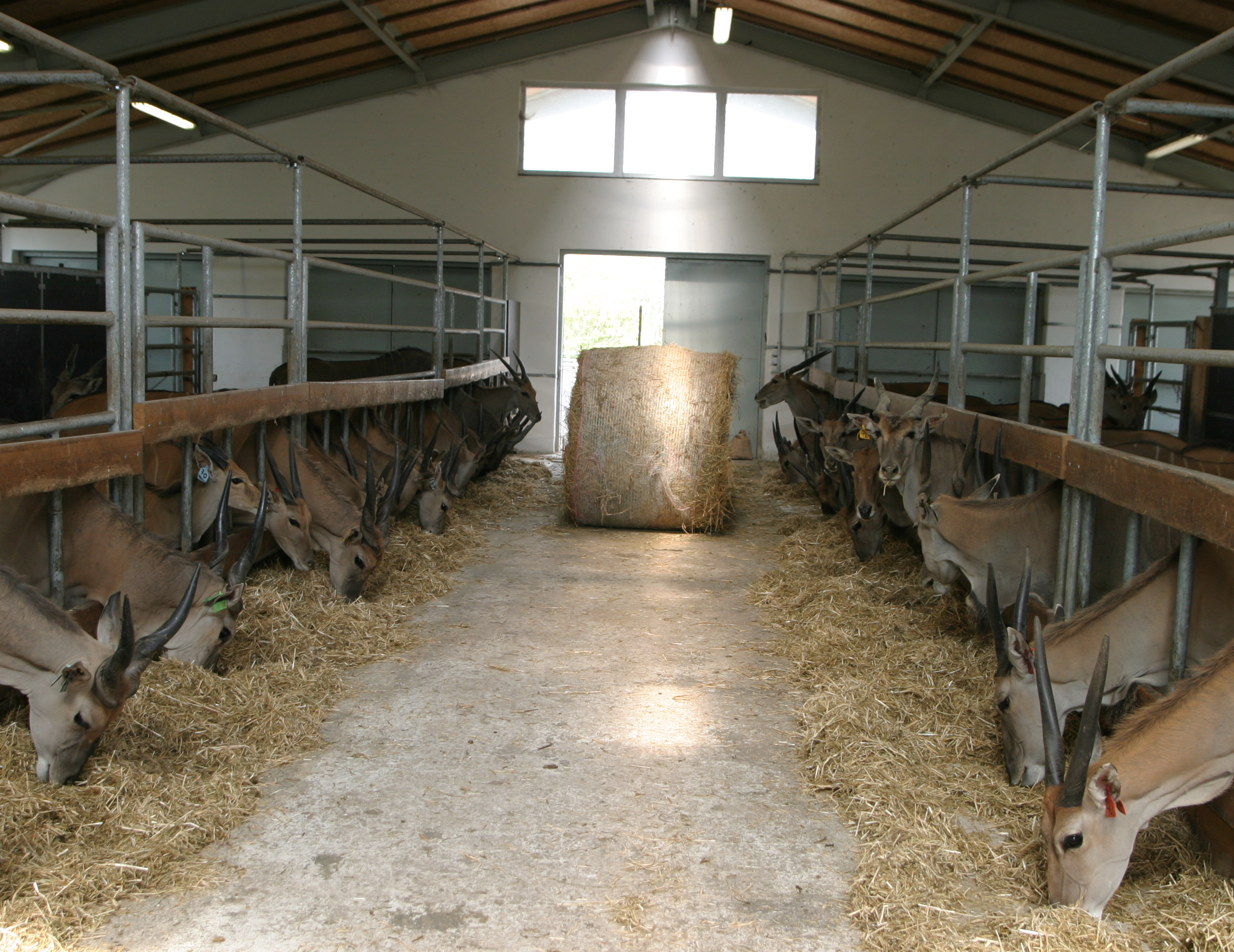
Common Eland Farm

The FTA has four departments:

- Department of Crop Sciences and Agroforestry
- Department of Sustainable Technologies
- Department of Animal Science and Food Processing
- Department of Economics and Development

Other faculty units:

- Botanical Garden
- Common Eland and Guanaco Farm
- BioResources & Technology Division, originally Biogas Research Team under leadership of Hynek Roubík

== Studies ==
The faculty actually offers study in two bachelor', six master's and three doctoral programs which are all (except one bachelor) taught in English. The total number of students in bachelors' and masters' study programmes is 503, of which 331 are foreigners.

=== Study programmes ===
- bachelor's degree programmes
  - Agriculture in Tropics and Subtropics - Tropické Zemědělství - taught in Czech
  - International Cooperation in Agriculture and Rural Development - taught in English
- master's degree programmes (taught in English)
  - Agri-food Systems and Rural Development
  - International Development and Agricultural Economics
  - Tropical Crop Management and Ecology
  - Tropical Forestry and Agroforestry
  - Tropical Farming Systems
  - Wildlife and Livestock Production, Management and Conservation
- PhD studies (taught in English)
  - Sustainable Rural Development
  - Agriculture in Tropics and Subtropics
  - Tropical Agrobiology and Bioresource Management
