= Sklenička =

Sklenička (feminine Skleničková) is a Czech surname meaning "small glass". Notable people include:

- Carol Sklenicka, American essayist
- David Sklenička, Czech ice hockey player
- Miroslava Skleničková, Czech gymnast
- Petr Sklenička, Czech environmentalist
