= Hron (disambiguation) =

The Hron is a river in Slovakia.

Hron may also refer to:

- Hron (grape), a Slovak wine grape variety

== People ==
- Jan Hron (born 1941), Czech agroscientist and academic
- John Hron (1981–1995), Swedish 14-year-old boy murdered by neo-Nazis
- Tomáš Hron (born 1981), Czech kickboxer
