= University of Prague =

University of Prague (Latin: Universitas Pragensis) most often refers to:

- Charles University, established in 1347 (named Charles-Ferdinand University between 1654 and 1920, in 1920 its Czech-speaking branch adopted the name Charles University, while the German-speaking branch was called German University in Prague and ceased to exist in 1945)

University of Prague may also refer to:

- Czech Technical University in Prague, established in 1863
- Czech University of Life Sciences Prague, established in 1906
- Prague University of Economics and Business, established in 1919
