= Balık =

Balık, Turkish for "fish", may refer to:

== Surname ==
- Balık sisters (born 1974), Turkish identical twin sister opera singers, Didem and Sinem
- Ezel Balık (born 2009), Turkish female volleyball player

== Places ==
- Balik, Azerbaijan, also Balık, a village in the Ismailli Rayon of Azerbaijan
