= Jiří Petr =

Czech agroscientist and university professor

- Petr in 1995
- Born: 13 May 1931; Hradec Králové, Czechoslovakia
- Died: 12 November 2014 (aged 83); Prague, Czech Republic
- Education: Czech Technical University in Prague
- Occupations: University Professor and Emeritus Chancellor (Rector Emeritus) of the Czech University of Agriculture Prague.

Jiří Petr, Prof., DrSc. Dr.h.c. (13 May 1931 – 12 November 2014) was a Czech agroscientist and university professor. He was emeritus Chancellor (Rector Emeritus) of the Czech University of Agriculture Prague.

== Biography ==
Petr was born on 13 May 1931 Hradec Králové, Czechoslovakia. First he visited the local primary school afterwards the secondary school in Broumov and finished with Matura. In 1949, he was sent to the Czech Technical University in Prague, Faculty of Agricultural and Forestry Engineering to study plant production with Examination as Dipl.Ing agr.

As postgraduate student he studied special plant production with student exchange in Moscow (RU), Rothamsted (UK) and Halle (former DDR). After staying in – Norway, Sweden, Denmark, Great Britain, Germany, France, Austria and Spain he published as candidate of agricultural sciences (CSc) the Doctor Thesis: "Biology of alternative wheat forms". During his habilitation with the thesis: "Study of the photoperiodic reaction in cereals and legumes" and the publication "Yield formation in the cereals" he was appointed as lecturer of plant production at Czech University of Agriculture Prague.

In 1989, Petr was nominated as Professor of Plant Production and additional - in 1990 he was elected as Rector of the Czech University of Agriculture Prague.

During his time as Rector (1990–1994), he opened the university to globalised science and education and prepared the integration of East and West.

== Memberships in Professional Societies ==
- Member of the Czech Academy of Agriculture, Prague, now honorary member
- State Committee for Scientific Degree, 12 years
- State Committee for Seed Testing (1990-1995 chairman)
- State Committee for Organic Agriculture
- Member of the International Federation of Organic Agriculture Movement
- The Grant Agency of the Czech Republic - 6 years in the post of the chairman
- Member of the Czechoslovak Society of Arts and Sciences
- Member of the European Society for Agronomy until 2002
- Honorary member of the Scientific board of the Czech University of Agriculture Prague
- Chairman of the editorial board of the scientific journal Scientia Agriculturae Bohemica SAB (1990–2010)
- Chairman of the editorial board of the Journal for Agricultural Practice ÚRODA (The Yield)

== Field of Research and Publications ==
Main task agricultural basic and practical research; growth and development processes during ontogenesis in cereals and pulse crops (legumes); biology of cereals; the growth regulators in cereals; the formation of the biological and economy yield in cereals and pulse crops (pea and bean); the effect of weather on crop production, integrated crop husbandry; alternative and ecological agriculture, quality of cereals from conventional and ecological agriculture; quality of cereals for different commercial use.

- Petr, J., Černý, Hruška et al.: Yield Formation in the Main Field Crops, (in Czech ), Prague 1980, in English published by the publishing house Elsevier Amsterdam 1988, in German DLG Berlin 1983, in Russian by the publishing house Moscow Kolos 1984, in Hungarian in the publishing house Mezögazdasági Kiádó, Budapest 1985
- Petr, J. ed.: Weather and Yield (in Czech), Prague 1987. In English by Elsevier, Amsterdam, 1991, in Russian published by Moscow Agroizdat, 1990
- Petr, J. et al.: Intensive Cereal Husbandry (in Czech) Prague, 1983, in Russian by Moscow Agroizdat, 1985
- Petr, J., Dlouhý et al.: Ecological Agriculture (in Czech) Prague 1992
- Petr, J.: Millet - 60 pp. In: Moudry et al. Buckwheat and millet (in Czech), Prague 2006

Additional more than 600 scientific papers and lectures.

== Honours and awards ==
- 1984
  - Winner of the Literary Prize of the Literary Fund the Czechoslovak Academy of Sciences for the books: Tvorba výnosu hlavních polních plodin (Formation of the Yield of Main Field Crops). This publication was awarded also in Russian translation in Moscow.
  - Other awarded books: Počasí a výnosy (Weather and Yields) and Intenzivní obilnářství (Intensive Cereals Management).
- 1981
  - "Gold Ear" and Gold Medal of the Academy of Agriculture, Czech Republic
- 1991
  - Medal of the Mendel University of Agriculture and Forestry, Brno
  - Medal of the Slovak University of Agriculture, Nitra
  - Medal of the South Bohemia University, České Budějovice
- 1999
  - Doctor Honoris Causa at the Swedish University of Agricultural Sciences, Uppsala
- 2002
  - Komenský Medal from the Ministry of Education, Youth and Sports of the Czech Republic
  - Gold Medal of the Czech University of Agriculture Prague
- 2006
- Great sculpture The God of Fertility Ops to the tribute of the First Centenary of Agricultural University in Prague
