= Quşəncə =

- Municipality
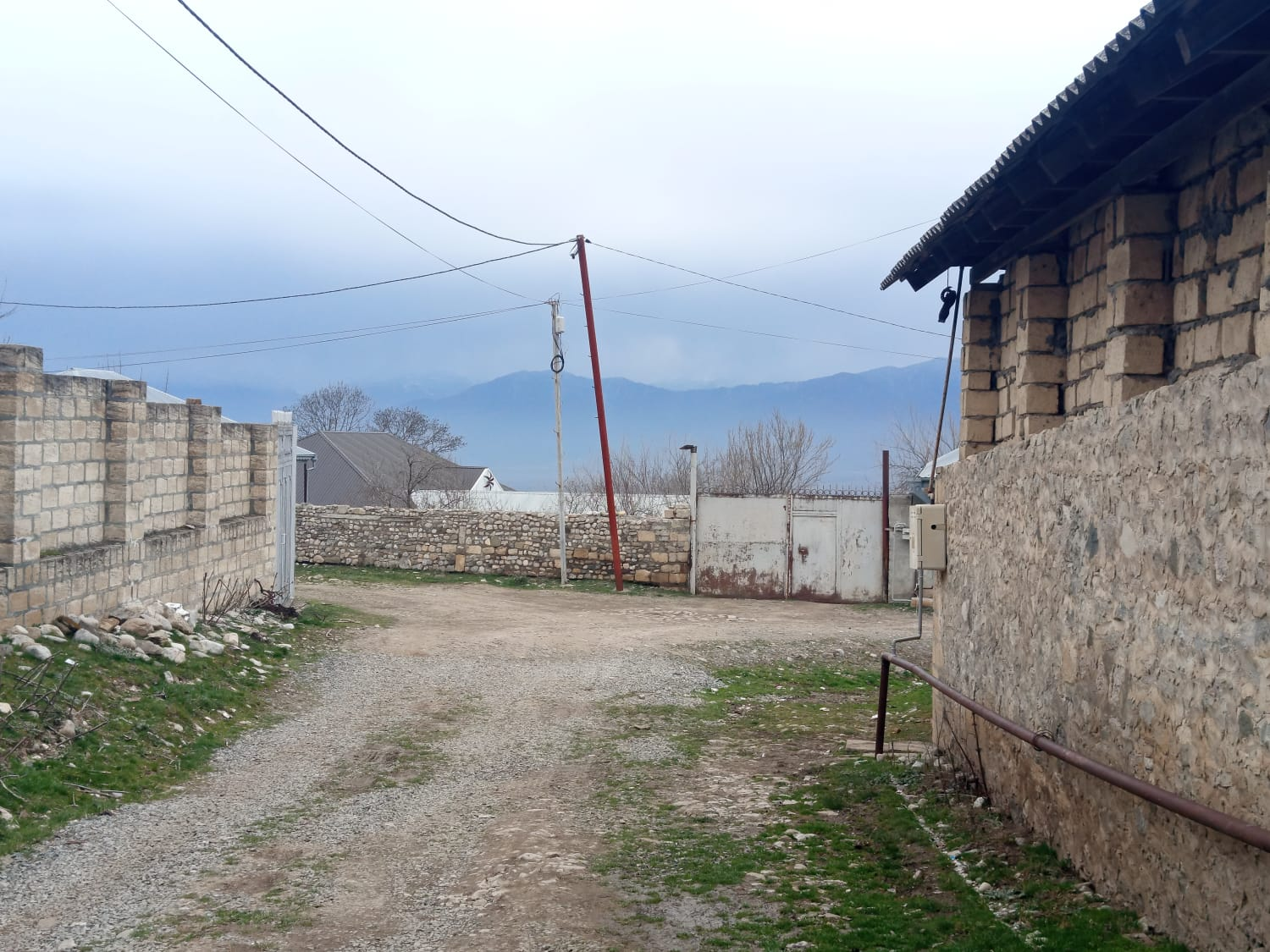

- Location within Azerbaijan
- Coordinates: 40°44′13″N 48°06′56″E
- Country: Azerbaijan
- Rayon: Ismailli
- Elevation: 879 m (2,884 ft)

Population
  - Total: 2,525
- Time zone: UTC+4 (AZT)
  - Summer (DST): UTC+5 (AZT)

Quşəncə (also, Quşencə, Kushendzha, Kushendzhe, and Kush-Yengidzha) is a village and municipality in the Ismailli Rayon of Azerbaijan. It has a population of 2,525, and the municipality consists of the villages of Quşəncə, Balik, and Enişdibi.

== Geography ==
Quşencə is located at the foot of the Burnovuldag range. The highest peak surrounding the village is Burunsuval Dag, which is around 1,104 metres (3,622 ft). To its south is the village of Zogalliq.

== Population ==
The village is composed fully of Azerbaijanis, according to data from 1977 the population was 1,446 people, entire village's population being Azerbaijani Turks .
