= Michal Lošťák =

Michal Lošťák (born 3 December 1963) is a Czech sociologist and university lecturer. He is the Rector of the Czech University of Life Sciences Prague.

== Life and work ==
Michal Lošťák was born on 3 December 1963 in Šumperk, Czechoslovakia. He is a graduate of the Faculty of Social Sciences at Charles University in Prague, where he obtained a degree in sociology, and the Belarusian State University in Minsk, where he obtained a degree in philosophy. He was awarded his habilitation in the field of management at the Czech University of Life Sciences Prague (CULS) in 2017.

In his academic career, Lošťák works as a lecturer at the Institute of Humanities within the Faculty of Economics and Management at the CULS. His work focuses on issues of regional and rural development, as well as the socio-cultural and socio-economic context of agriculture and food.

Another key area of his work is social innovation. He was responsible for the Master's programme in Public Administration and Regional Development and for the PhD programme in Social and Regional Development. He was involved in several projects under the European Horizon programme. Lošťák was Head of the Department of Humanities and First Vice-Rector of the CULS. Following the election on 23 October 2025, Lošťák succeeded Petr Sklenička as Rector of the CULS on 1 February 2026.

Lošťák is a member of the editorial board of the journal Agricultural Economics, President of the international academic organisation CASEE (International Academy of Sciences for Central and South-Eastern Europe), and a member of the academic advisory board of the Faculty of International Relations at the Prague University of Economics and Business, and Palacký University of Olomouc.
