= Observation.org =

Website and apps for collecting, validating and sharing biodiversity observations

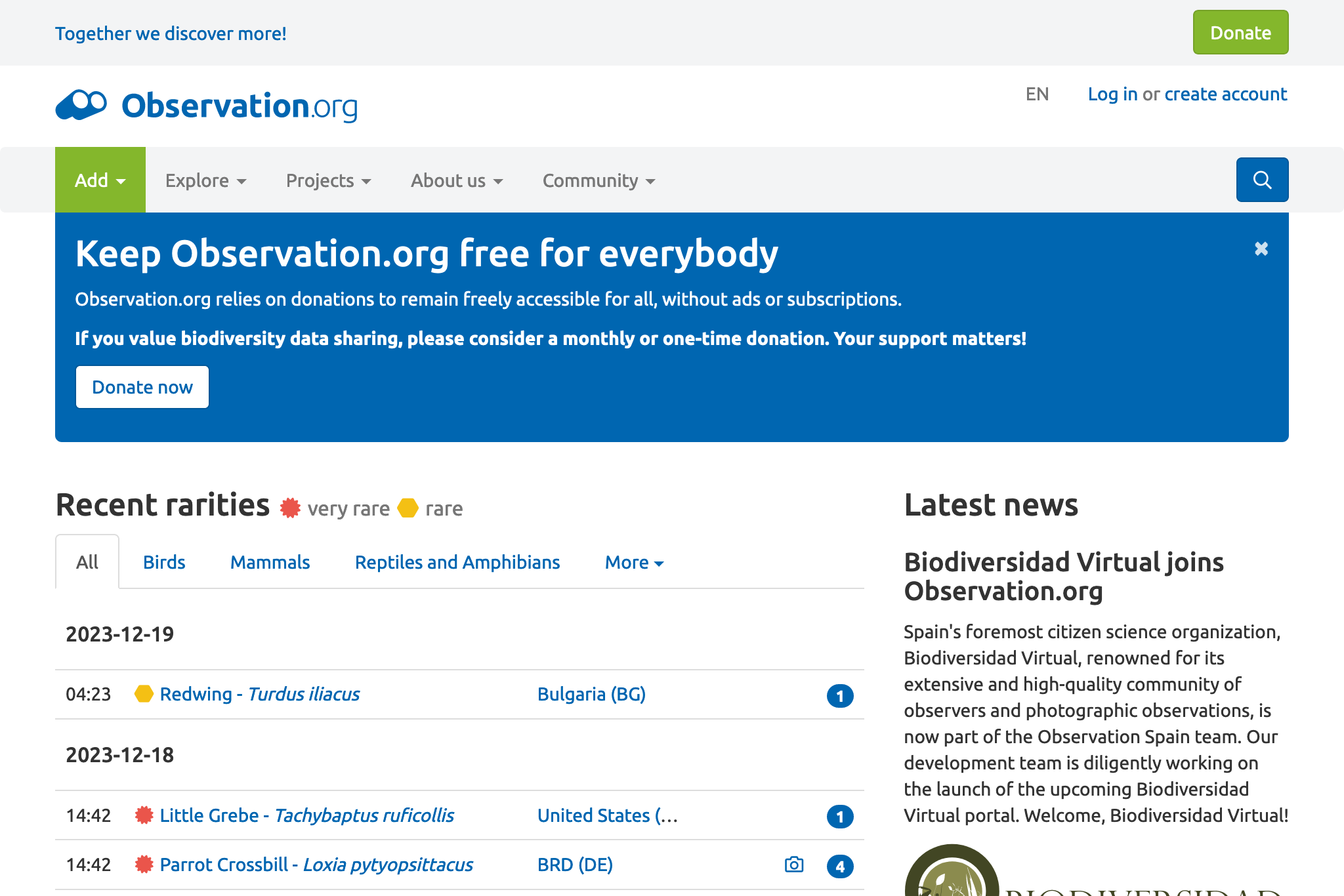
- Website type: Citizen science
- Area served: Worldwide
- Website: observation.org
- Commercial: No
- Registration: Optional
- Launched: 2004; 22 years ago
- Current status: Active

Observation.org is a worldwide platform of naturalists, citizen scientists, and biologists to collect, validate and share biodiversity observations. Observation.org may be accessed via its website or from its mobile applications like ObsIdentify or Observation. By 2026, the database has grown to include over 314 million nature observations of 145,595 species, supported by 138 million photos contributed by 584,000 users. It is published and hosted in the Netherlands under Dutch and European law by the non-profit foundation Observation International.

== History ==
The history of Observation International began in 2003 with the launch of Waarneming.nl. Since then, it has grown steadily, reaching 50 million observations in 2017 and over 154 million observations in 2026. Subsequently, the Belgian Waarnemingen.be followed in 2008 and includes over 93 million observations as of 2026. There were 5000 daily visitors and a total of 1.5 million after 5 years. During the COVID-19 pandemic location data of observations were hidden to prevent gathering of bird watchers.

== Quality assurance ==
Quality assurance measures on Observation.org is managed by established species experts responsible for curating the reference set of observations. Automated validation, supported by artificial intelligence, uses this reference set to aid validators in managing the extensive dataset. However, human experts retain final authority in all validation matters. As of 2026, over half (62%) of the observations have been validated.

== Open data ==
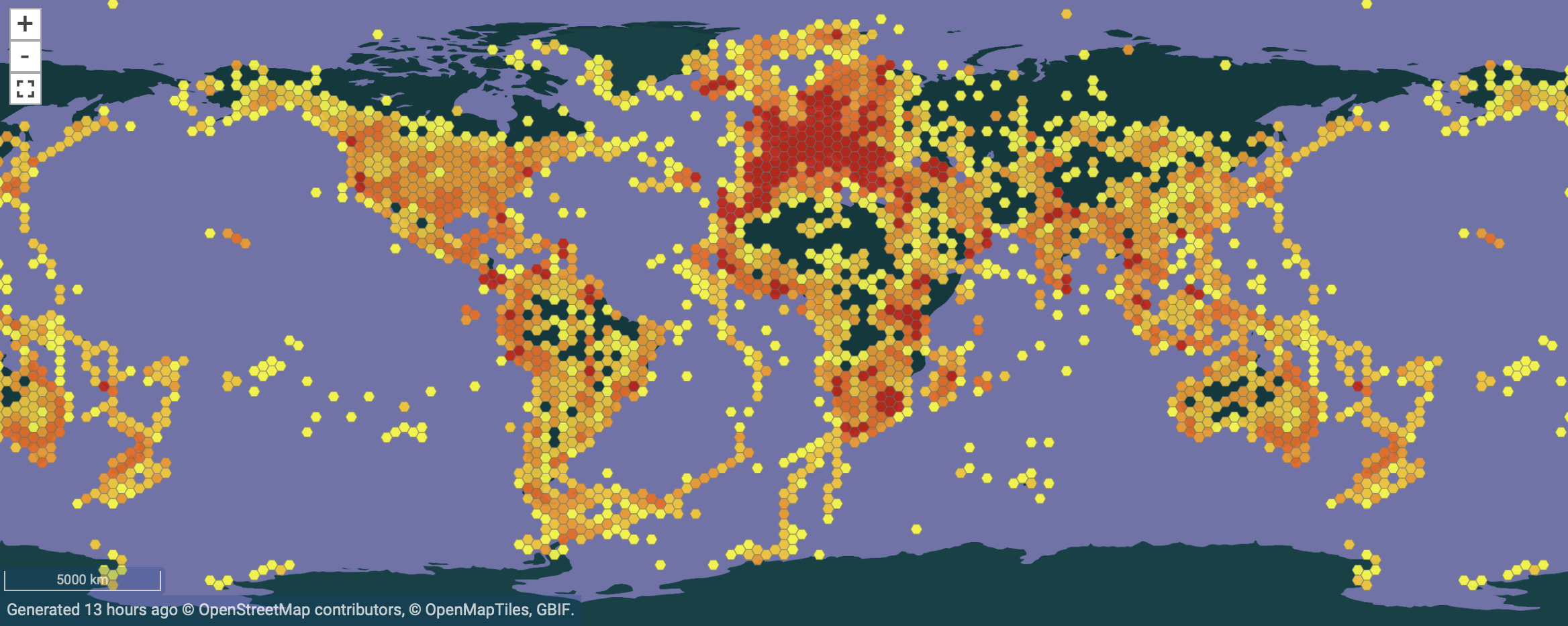
Map of Observation.org data on GBIF

The observations that have been approved are shared as open data on Global Biodiversity Information Facility (GBIF). The dataset comprises approximately 82 million occurrences, 19 million annotated photos and 69,000 annotated sound recordings. Observation.org is the third largest publisher of the world on GBIF.

== Use of Observation.org data ==
As of December 2023, more than 1,700 research results have been published that cite the Observation.org dataset on GBIF, often in the fields of ecology, conservation, and climate change. This research includes for example the discovery of new species for a country, documentation of changes in behavior, monitoring invasive alien species, finding causes of local extinction and tracking zoonoses such as Avian influenza. Other examples are the integration of nature data into national research programmes and European biodiversity projects. The annotated Observation.org photos are used to train automatic species recognition models.

Users of Observation.org regularly participate in Bioblitzes to collaboratively collect nature observations. Examples of these Bioblitzes are the City Nature Challenge, the Biomaratón de Otoño in Spain and the annual ICA Biodiversity Challenge Bioblitz; organized among ICA-affiliated European universities, which is an event where participating universities compete to record the highest number of species on their campuses to raise awareness for biodiversity.

In 2025 the German Robert Koch Institute started a cooperation project ZEMEKI with Observation.org to evaluate the spread of ticks and mosquitos as carriers of diseases. The focus is on the tiger mosquito, a disease vector for Dengue and Chikungunya.

== Public perception ==
- The UK Centre for Ecology & Hydrology recommends the app ObsIdentify beside others for detection of alien species.
- As apps for identification NatureSpot recommends Seek and ObsIdentify.
- The Sussex Wildlife Trust finds that ObsIdentify works particularly well with invertebrates.
- ObsIdentify, iNaturalist, Seek, iRecord and Picture This are the favorite identifying apps for the Natural History Society of Northumbria (NHSN)
- Birdwatch (magazine) UK draws a positive conclusion after testing ObsIdentify. It is easy to use and provides a lot of information.

== International names ==
In the Netherlands, Observation.org is primarily known as Waarneming.nl. In the Dutch Caribbean, the name Observation.org is used. In Belgium, the platform is primarily known as Waarnemingen.be (Flanders) and Observations.be (Wallonia).
