= Pavel Tlustoš =

Czech agricultural chemist

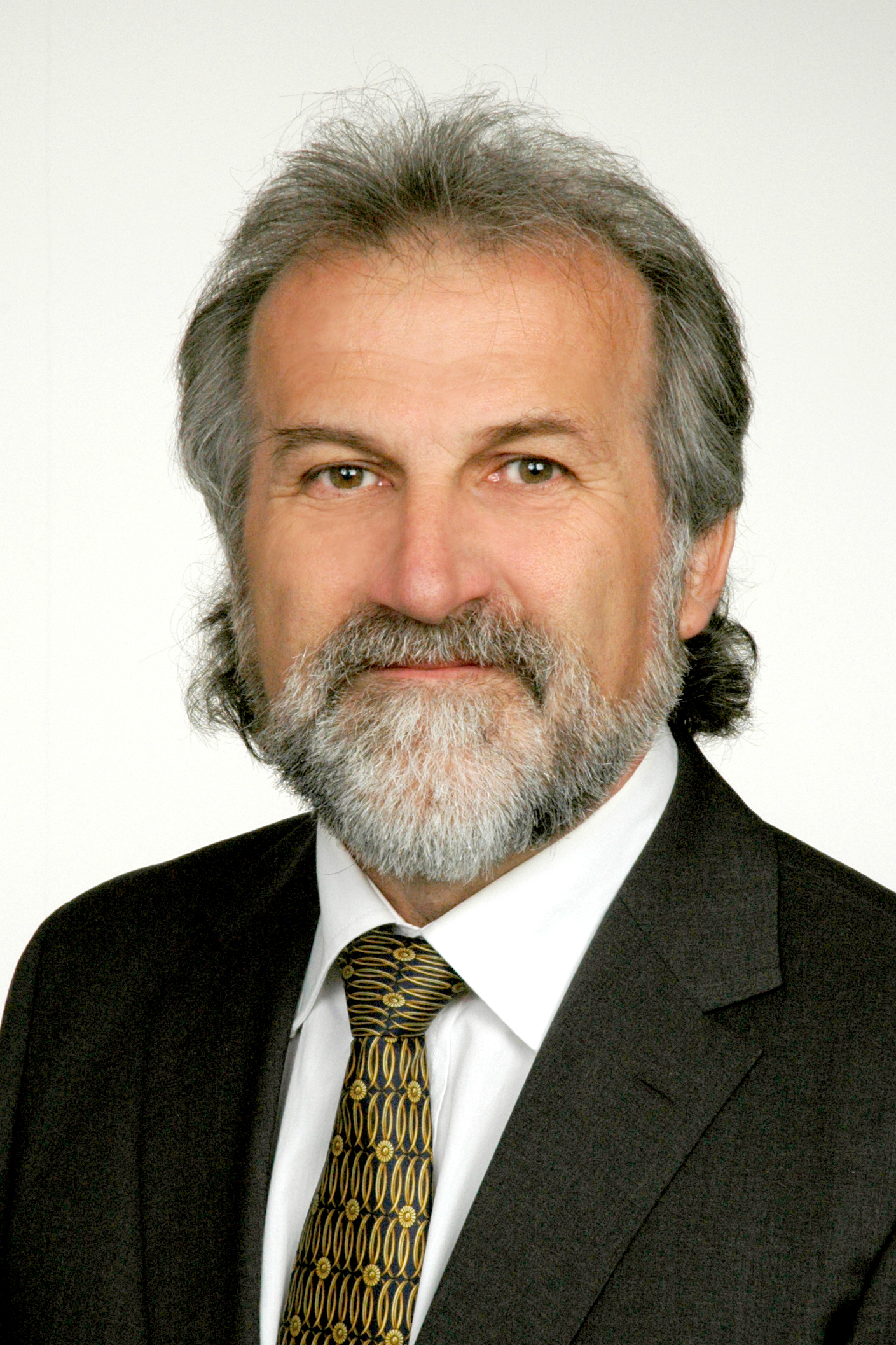
Tlustoš in 2016

Pavel Tlustoš (born 27 February 1955) is a Czech agricultural chemist. From 2000 to 2010 he was vice dean of the Faculty of Agricultural Biology, Food and Natural Resources of the Czech University of Life Sciences Prague (CULS), and from 2010 to February 2018 he was the dean of the faculty. Since March 2018 he is again vice dean and responsible for international relations the faculty.

== Life and work ==
Tlustoš was born on 27 February 1955 in Nové Město na Moravě, Czechoslovakia. After graduating, he studied Inorganic Chemistry at the University of Pardubice (1974–1979) and graduated as a Diploma engineer. He worked as a chemical technician for the Chirana company, before joining CULS as a research assistant in agrochemistry and plant nutrition. He began his PhD study in 1984 and defended his thesis Environmental fate of slow release fertilizers at the Czech Agricultural University in Prague in 1989. His career continued with research fellowships at Iowa State University in the United States (a Fulbright scholarship) and at IACR Rothamsted in England (Rothamsted International scholarship), as well as various lecturing positions. He received his Venia legendi in Agrochemistry and Plant Nutrition and a professorship of CULS from Czech president Václav Havel in 2002. In 2000, Tlustoš had been appointed Vice-dean for education at the Faculty of Agrobiology, Food and Natural Resources, and he became Dean in 2010. He is also deputy head of the Department of Agro-Environmental Chemistry and Plant Nutrition. Through his research in the field of bioeffectors he has close links with the University of Hohenheim. In 2019 he received an Honorary Doctorate of the Slovak University of Agriculture in 2019.

His main research areas are:

- soil-plant relations, in particular the effects of nutrients and toxic substances
- mobility of nutrients, risk elements and toxic compounds in the soil, especially in the rhizosphere
- the effect of soil amendments on the mobility of elements in soil and their availability for plants
- the treatment and recycling of waste materials, their processing and applicability in agriculture and horticulture
- soil detoxification by plants and living organisms
- the environmental behavior of fertilizers and release of nutrients

== Membership of professional bodies ==
Tlustoš is a member of the Audit Committees of the Faculty of Agriculture of the University of South Bohemia in České Budějovice, the Faculty of Agrobiology and Food Resources of the Slovak University in Nitra, and the Faculty of Agronomy of Mendel University, Brno. He is on the advisory boards of the Plant Research Institute in Prague Ruzyne, and the Research Institute for Soil and Water Conservation in Prague Zbraslav. He is also a paid member of numerous international journals about soil chemistry, plant nutrition and environmental research.

== Selected publications ==
As of 2016 Tlustoš has published around 194 research papers that have been cited 1494 times, with a Hirsch index of 22. He has supervised 20 PhD students and around 100 diploma students and is a member of the Biofector research team.

- Břendová, K., Tlustoš, P., Száková, J. (2015): Can biochar from contaminated biomass be Applied into soil for remediation purposes? Water Air Soil Pollut. 226 (6): 193-204. IF = 1.554
- Hanc, A., Tlustoš, P., Száková, J., Habart, J. (2009): Changes in cadmium mobility during composting and soil after application. Waste Manage. 29 (8): 2282-2288. IF = 3.220
- Javorská, H., Tlustoš, P., Komárek, M., Lestan, D., Kaliszová, R., Száková J. (2009): Effect of ozonation on polychlorinated biphenyl degradation and on soil physico-chemical properties. J. Hazard. Mater. 161 (2-3): 1202-1207. IF = 4.529
- Komárek, M., Tlustoš, P., Száková, J., Chrastný, V., Ettler, V. (2007): The use of maize and poplar in chelant-enhanced phytoextraction of lead from contaminated agricultural soils. Chemosphere. 67 (4): 640-651. IF = 3.340
- Kosnar, Z., Mercl, F., Perná, I., Tlustoš P. (2016): Investigation of polycyclic aromatic hydrocarbon content in fly ash and bottom ash of biomass incineration plants in relation to the operating temperature and unburned carbon content. Sci.Total Environ. 563-564: 53-61. IF = 4.099
- Kubátová, P., Hejcman, M., Száková, J., Vondráčková, S., Tlustoš, P. (2016): Effect of sewage sludge application on biomass production and Concentrations of Cd, Pb and Zn in shoots of Salix and Populus clones: improvement of phytoremediation efficiency in contaminated soils. BioEnergy Res doi:. 10.1007 / s12155-016-9727-1. IF = 3.541
- Vondráčková, S., Száková, J., Drábek, O., Tejnecký, V., Hejcman, M., Müllerová, V., Tlustoš, P. (2015): aluminum uptake and translocation in Al hyperaccumulator Rumex obtusifolius is affected by low-molecular-weight organic acids content and soil pH. PLoS One. 10 (4): 1-18. IF = 3.234
- Unterbrunner, R., Puschenreiter, M., Sommer, P., Wieshammer, G., Tlustoš, P., Zupan, M., Wenzel, WW (2007): Heavy metal accumulation in trees growing on contaminated sites in Central Europe. Environ. Pollut. 148 (1): 107-114. IF 4.143
