= Balaka =

Balaka may refer to:

- Balaka (Bengali poetry), by Rabindranath Tagore
- Balaka District in Southern Region, Malawi
- Balaka Township, Malawi, a city in the aforementioned district
- Balaka (plant), a genus of palm trees
- Biman Bangladesh Airlines
- Balaka Cineworld, a movie theater in Bangladesh
- Bālaka, a 12th century Sanskrit scholar from Bengal

== See also ==
- Anti-balaka, an alliance of militia groups based in the Central African Republic
