= Enişdibi =

- Location within Azerbaijan
- Coordinates: 40°43′32″N 48°03′05″E
- Country: Azerbaijan
- Rayon: Ismailli
- Municipality: Quşəncə
- Time zone: UTC+4 (AZT)
  - Summer (DST): UTC+5 (AZT)

Enişdibi (also, Enishdibi and Ehishdibi) is a village in the Ismailli Rayon of Azerbaijan. The village forms part of the municipality of Quşəncə.
