= Balik (name) =

Balik is a name.

Balik Name Meaning Polish and Slovak (Balík): from a pet form of Bal, a short form of the personal name Baltazar or of Hungarian Balázs (see Balazs).Hungarian: perhaps from Turkish balyq ‘fish’.

Those bearing it include:

- Balik (died 1347), Bulgarian ruler
- Jiri Balik (born 1953), Czech agroscientist
- Jaroslav Balík (1924-1996), Czech film director
- Balık Sisters (born 1974), Turkish twin singers
