= Balyk (disambiguation) =

Balyk is a dried-fish product.

Balyk also may refer to:

- Balyk, bell of Great Lavra Belltower
- Bolshoy Balyk River in Khanty–Mansia

== See also ==
- Balik (disambiguation)
