= Balika Badhu =

Balika Badhu (lit. 'Child Bride') may refer to:

- Balika Badhu (1967 film), a 1967 Indian Bengali-language film directed by Tarun Majumdar
- Balika Badhu (1976 film), a 1976 Indian Hindi-language film directed by Tarun Majumdar
- Balika Vadhu, an Indian television series
  - Balika Vadhu 2, a sequel TV show

== See also ==
- Balik (disambiguation)
