= Czech University of Life Sciences Prague =

Agricultural university in Prague, the Czech Republic

Czech University of Life Sciences in Prague
- Česká zemědělská univerzita v Praze
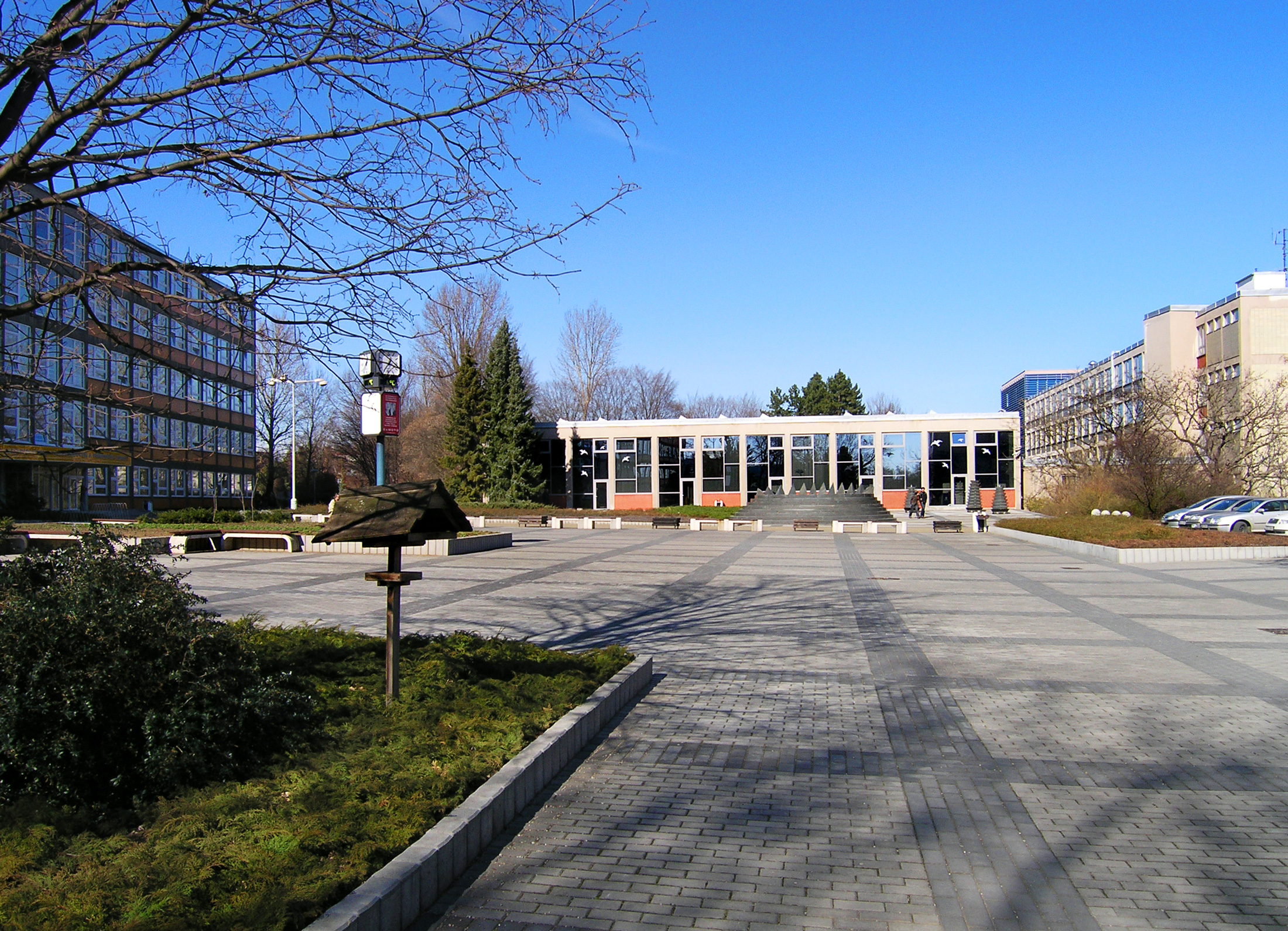
- Type: Public
- Established: 1906 / 1952
- Rector: prof. PhDr. Michal Lošťák, Ph.D.
- Students: 19 930 (2024)
- Location: Prague, Czech Republic; 50°8′9.2″N 14°22′14.8″E
- Campus: Prague-Suchdol
- Website: http://www.czu.cz/en/
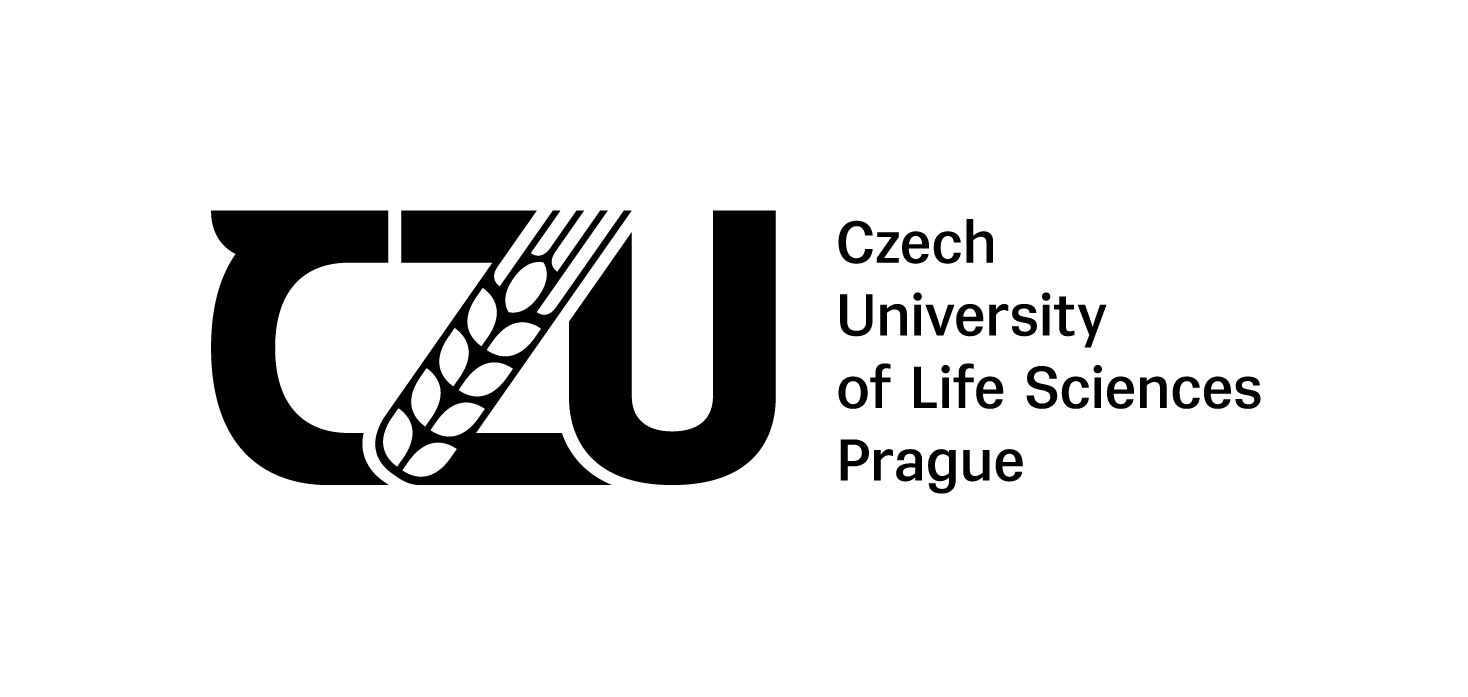

University rankings

Global – Overall
- QS World: 761-770 (2026)

Regional – Overall
- QS Emerging Europe and Central Asia: 59 (2022)

Czech University of Life Sciences Prague (CZU; (Czech: Česká zemědělská univerzita v Praze), ČZU; also Czech University of Agriculture in Prague) is a university of agricultural education and research in Prague, the Czech Republic, established in 1906.

== History ==
Studies of agriculture were established at the Czech Technical University (ČVUT) in 1906, and the first agricultural engineers graduated in 1911. In 1920 the Faculty of Agriculture and Forestry was established, and in 1952 the faculty became an independent institution, University College of Agriculture in Prague (Czech: Vysoká škola zemědělská v Praze; VŠZ). In 1966 it moved to a newly built campus in Prague-Suchdol, where it has been located since.

The Faculty of Forestry, established in 1952, was part of ČVUT until 1959, then a part of the agricultural university until 1964, when it became the independent Institute of Forestry Science (Czech: Vědecký lesnický ústav). It has been a part of ČZU since 1990.

The university adopted its current name in 1995.

During communist rule in Czechoslovakia, the university was lavishly funded as part of state support of collectivised agriculture.

From 1952 to 1980 the master's degree offered by the university lasted five years. It then switched to a four-year course from 1980–90, before switching back to five years. Since 1993 three-year bachelor study has also been available.

== Academics ==
The university offers bachelors' programmes and Master's programmes (based on credit system) and doctoral programmes.

The university offer now includes a total of 40 programmes taught in English, approximately 15 of which are in the bachelor level and 25 in the master's level of studies.

The Secretary of the Association for European Life Science Universities is located at CULS. In 2005 the Czech University of Life Sciences (CULS) became a member of the Euroleague for Life Sciences (ELLS), and it is also a member of the Biofector project.

== Faculties and Institutes ==
- The Faculty of Environmental Sciences offers programs pertaining to environmental modeling, landscape planning, nature conservation, and geosciences.
- The Faculty of Economics and Management provides courses related to the management of agricultural companies, and the management and economics of rural and non-urban businesses, including finance, banking, insurance, IT, trade, rural and regional development and other issues related to the agrifood complex. Since 2022, the Dean of the Faculty has been Tomáš Šubrt.
- The Faculty of Agrobiology, Food and Natural Resources provides courses related to traditional fields of crop and animal production, natural resources and the environment. Since 2022, the Dean of the Faculty has been Josef Soukup.
- The Faculty of Forestry and Wood Sciences provides courses related to forestry, game management, and the timber industry. The Faculty works on theoretical and applied research in the field of forestry, wood industry and management of wild animals. Since 2020, the Dean of the Faculty has been Róbert Marušák.
- The graduates of the Faculty of Engineering are industrial engineers who work with technology, machinery and manufacturing equipment for use in agriculture, market gardening, forestry and other related industries. Since 2018, the Dean of the Faculty has been Jiří Mašek.
- The Faculty of Tropical AgriSciences (formerly named Institute of Tropics and Subtropics) provides courses focusing on tropical agriculture, rural development and the sustainable management of natural resources in the tropics. From 2021 till 2025 the Dean of the Faculty has been Patrick Van Damme. Since 2025 the Dean of the Faculty has been Hynek Roubík. The Faculty was established in 2013 by the transformation of the Institute of tropics and subtropics (ITS).
- The Institute for Education and Consultancy is an independent pedagogical and scientific institution specialising in agricultural and forestry training and providing consultant services.
- The Department of Physical Education is an independent department of the Czech University of Agriculture and provides physical training to students.

=== Business enterprises ===
- The University Farm at Lány is an educational facility, founded in 1960 on a farm that had previously belonged to the Office of the President of the Czechoslovak Republic. Surrounding the farm were properties established in around 1850 as part of the Křivoklát Estate. In 1921 they were purchased by the Czechoslovak state together with Lány Castle and the forest districts. The castle and adjacent forests are now used as a retreat by the President of the Czech Republic. The farm is used for practical training for students of the university as well as other agricultural schools and the public. It participates in the research work undertaken by departments and faculties of the university. The farm cultivates 3,000 hectares of farmland with annual production of about 9,000 tonnes of grain, 2,000 tonnes oilseed rape and fodder crops for the farm's own use. As a gene pool, the University Farm rears a herd of original Czech Red cattle, Kladruber horses and Norik horses. There is also a herd of common elands and guanacos, on which research is being conducted into domestication and utilisation as alternative species for extensive farming in temperate climate.
- The Mělník farm north east of Prague cultivates 11 hectares of grapevines and produces its own wine. Apricots, peaches and apples are also grown on 4.5 hectares of land. The University Farm has 1,100 head of cattle, of which 440 are Holsteins with annual production of 9,400 litres of milk, and 80 are Jerseys with annual production of 5,900 litres milk. The farm also rears about 4,000 head of pigs, which produce approximately 400 tonnes of pig meat annually. The farm produces 600,000 chickens each year, which are slaughtered and processed in the farm's own slaughterhouses.
- The University Forest Establishment at Kostelec nad Černými lesy is a 4,600 hectare forest with a castle, a garden centre, a sawmill, 70 hectares of fishponds, and education facilities, used for routine forestry operations and education of students of the Faculty of Forestry, as well as practical training in fish farming for students of the Agronomy and Forestry Faculties.
- A 12-hectare arboretum was established in 1954. The castle has the capacity to accommodate and cater for some 100 students.

== Rectors ==
- 1952–1960 – Vladimir Kosil
- 1960–1966 – Karel Kudrna
- 1966–1970 – Emil Kunz
- 1970–1985 – Ctibor Ledl
- 1985–1990 – Josef Cervenka
- 1990–1994 – Jiří Petr
- 1994–2000 – Jan Hron
- 2000–2003 – Josef Kozak
- 2003–2009 – Jan Hron
- 2010–2018 – Jiri Balik
- 2018–2026 – Petr Sklenička
- 2026–2030 – Michal Lošťák

== Notable professors and alumni ==
- Peter Nick (born 1962), Professor of Molecular Cell Biology at the Karlsruhe Institute of Technology (KIT)
- Manfred G. Raupp (born 1941), Professor of the Steering committee, Training and Dissemination of the Biofector project
- Pavel Tlustoš (born 1955), Professor in Agrochemistry and Plant Nutrition
- Alessandro Piccolo (born 1951), Italian Visiting-Professor from University of Naples

== See also ==
- GMO Forum CZU Prague
