= Association for European Life Science Universities =

The Association for European Life Science Universities (ICA) is an association of more than 60 biological science universities whose goal is the improvement and coordination of scientific education, and participation in joint projects. The secretariat-general of the ICA is on the campus of the Czech University of Life Sciences Prague.

== History ==
The ICA, a network of European universities, was founded in 1988 (37 years ago) as Interfaculty Committee Agraria. In 2006, it received its current name. All universities in the 46 European countries of the Bologna process which concentrate on the biological science areas of agriculture, nutrition, forestry, natural resources, countryside development and ecology are eligible for membership. Associate membership is open to universities outside Europe.

The ICA links together seven permanent committees under the umbrella of the ICA Council, which has the function of a forum for networking and for the initiation of new projects between the permanent committees and the ICA. It also cooperates with other European and international networks and with international student organisations.

The central objectives of the ICA, on professional, organisational and political levels, is the promotion and support of European universities which focus on biological sciences. This includes taking an active role in quality control and accreditation processes, improving relations between business and universities in matters concerning education, research and innovation by supporting the internationalisation of members and through its participation in the work of international networks.
