= Petr Sklenička =

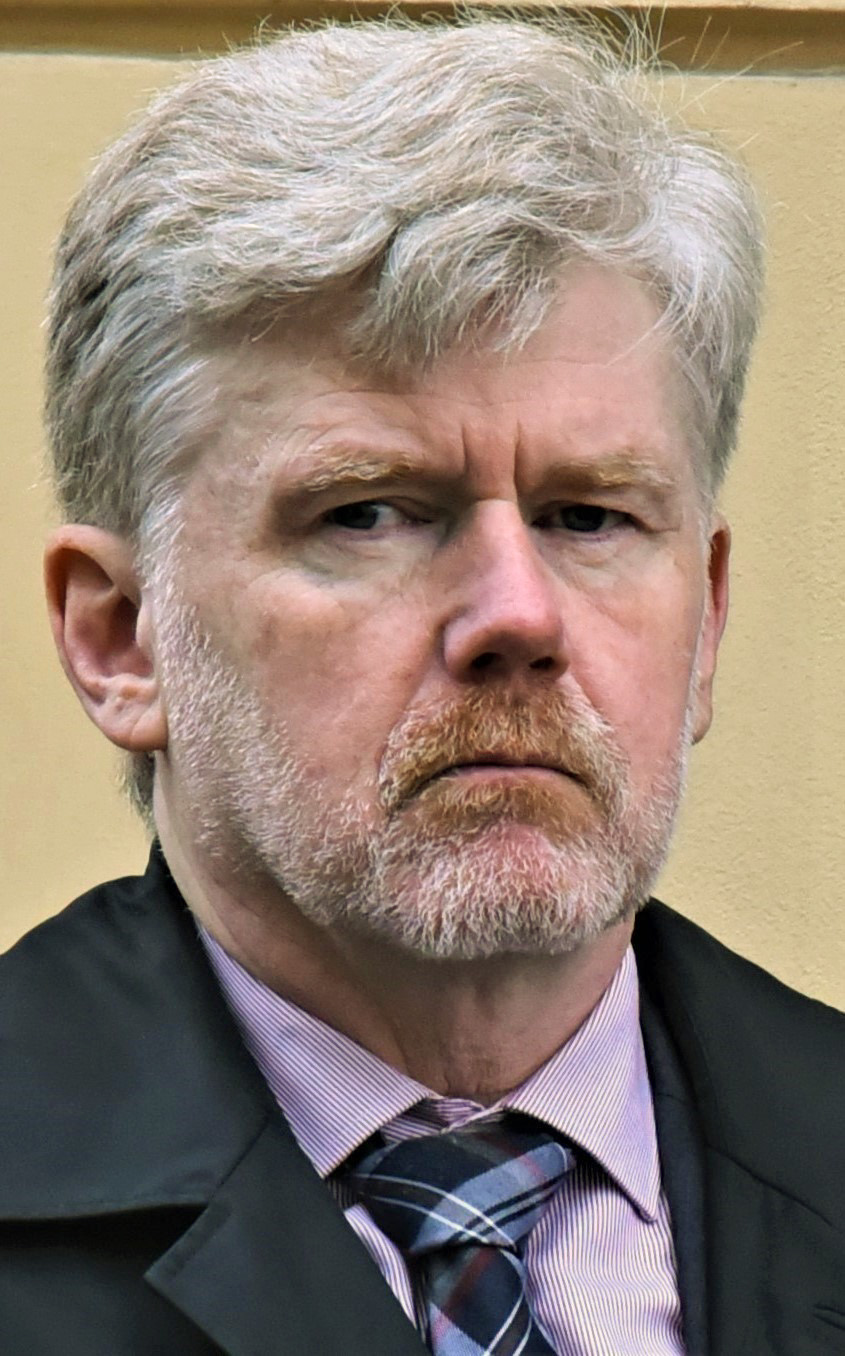
Petr Sklenička (2019)

Petr Sklenička (born 1 February 1964 in Česká Lípa) is a Czech University Lecturer in Environmental Science. He has been Rector of the Czech University of Life Sciences Prague (CZU) since February 2018.

== Life and work ==
On the foundation of the Faculty of Environmental Science in 2007 Sklenička became Dean and remained in this position until 2014. From 2014 until 2018 he was Vice Rector for Science and Research at the CZU. Sklenička held seminars and tutorials on the theme of soil- and landscape protection, in particular land management and landscape ecology. Since 2005 he has at the same time taught at the Czech Technical University in Prague (CVUT). For six months in 2006 he taught as Guest Professor of Land Management and Natural Resources at Utah State University (USA). At the end of January beginning of February 2018 Sklenička took over the Rectorship of the CZU from Jiří Balík. In October 2021, he was reelected as the Rector for a second term.

== Publications ==
- Ca. 200 scientific publications on Landscape and Town Planning; Land Use Policy; Applied Energy.
