= Jiři Balik =

Czech agroscientist and university professor

Jiři Balik (born 1953) is a Czech Agroscientist, University Professor and Pastrector of the Czech University of Life Sciences Prague (CULS).

== Biography ==
Balik was born in Tábor on November 30, 1953; he is married and has two children. The Professor of Agrochemistry and Plant Nutrition was 2010 until January 2018 Rector of the Czech University of Life Sciences Prague (CULS).

== Higher education and academic career ==
- 1973–1978: Graduate studies at Faculty of Agronomy, University of Agriculture Prague
- 1979–1982: Doctoral studies at Faculty of Agronomy, University of Agriculture Prague, Department of Agroenvironmental Chemistry and Plant Nutrition (AECPN)
- 1982–1994: Scientific Assistant, Faculty of Agronomy, University of Agriculture Prague, Department of Agroenvironmental Chemistry and Plant Nutrition (AECPN)
- 1994–2001: Associate Professor, Faculty of Agrobiology, Food and Natural Resources, Czech University of Agriculture Prague, Department of Agroenvironmental Chemistry and Plant Nutrition (AECPN)
- From 2001: Professor of Agrochemistry and Plant Nutrition, Faculty of Agrobiology, Food and Natural Resources, Czech University of Agriculture Prague, Department of Agroenvironmental Chemistry and Plant Nutrition (AECPN)
- 1994–1996: Deputy Head of Department of Agroenvironmental Chemistry and Plant Nutrition (AECPN), Faculty of Agrobiology, Food and Natural Resources, Czech University of Agriculture Prague
- 1997–2000: Vice Dean for Studies & Didactics, Faculty of Agrobiology, Food and Natural Resources, Czech University of Agriculture Prague
- 2000–2003: Vice Rector for Science and Research, Czech University of Agriculture Prague
- 2003–2010: Vice Rector for University Estates & Communication with Specialists
- Since 2001: Head of Department of Agroenvironmental Chemistry and Plant Nutrition (AECPN), Faculty of Agrobiology, Food and Natural Resources, Czech University of Agriculture Prague (from 2007 Czech University of Life Sciences Prague)
- Since 2010: Rector, Czech University of Life Sciences Prague
- 2017 University of Natural Resources and Life Sciences, Vienna Appoints Jiri Balik Dr. h.c.

== Specialisation ==
Plant nutrition with focus on issues related to nitrogen, phosphor, sulphur, transfer of elements and matter in the rhizosphere, new methods in fertiliser applications (CULTAN), management of waste in agricultural production. Resolver and co-resolver of a number of national projects (e.g. Czech Grant Agency, National Agency for Agricultural Research) and international projects (e.g. COST, EUREKA, Socrates, Gruntvig, EHP Norway). Research outcomes published mainly in Peer-Reviewed Journals with Impact Factor (e.g. Plant & Soil; Plant, Soil, & Environment; Ecotoxicology & Environmental Safety; Chemosphere, etc.). Author of a monographic publication: “Transfer of elements and matter in the rhizosphere”.

- Title of PhD Thesis: Contribution to Balance of Nitrogen in Soil (15N) and its Utility for Plants
- Title of Associate Professor Dissertation: Ions Interaction in Soil Solution in Connection with Yield and Quality of Fodder Oats and Silage Maize
- Professor Nomination in Subject Area: Agrochemistry and Plant Nutrition

== International study and teaching assignments ==
- Rheinische Friedrich-Wilhelms-Universität Bonn
- Justus-Liebig-Universität Gießen
- Humboldt Universität zu Berlin
- Institute of Soils Sciences and Photosynthesis USSR Academy of Sciences, Pushchino na Oke

== Didactic assignments ==
- Head, PhD Subject Area Commission – General Plant Production, Faculty of Agrobiology, Food and Natural Resources, Czech University of Agriculture Prague
- Member, PhD Subject Area Commission, Faculty of Agriculture, South Bohemian University, Budweis; PhD Subject Area Commission, Faculty of Agronomy, Mendel University of Agriculture and Forestry, Brno.
- Guarantor, BSc and MSc courses in plant nutrition and fertilisers use.
- Supervisor, BSc and MSc Thesis, PhD students

== Membership on scientific boards ==
- Czech University of Life Sciences Prague
- Faculty of Agrobiology, Food and Natural Resources, Czech University of Life Sciences Prague
- Faculty of Agriculture, South Bohemian University, Budweis
- South Bohemian University, Budweis
- Mendel University of Agriculture and Forestry, Brno.
- Veterinary and Pharmacology University, Brno
- Slovak University of Agriculture, Nitra, Slovakia
- Technical University in Zvolen, Slovakia
- Plant Production Research Centre, Prague - Ruzyně
- Bioindicator and Revitalisation Centre, Prague

== Publication indicators ==
- Number of scientific papers cited on the Web of Science – 96
- Number of citations in the Science Citation Index – 268
- Hirsch Index - 12
