= Balaka (Bengali poetry) =

Bengali poetry book written by Rabindranath Tagore

Balaka (Bengali: বলাকা: English: "A Flight of Swans") is a Bengali poetry book written by Rabindranath Tagore. It was published in 1916. It is the first significant work of the "Balaka Stage" of Rabindranath's poetry.

== Dedication ==
Tagore dedicated the book to W. Pearson. He was his friend.

== Theme ==
Rabindranath was a worshipper of speed. The melody of consciousness of the poet-mind is evident in the book. The dynamics of creation, the mystery of eternal velocity in the universe is observed in it.
