= Zoğallıq =

Village in Ismailli Rayon, Azerbaijan

Coordinates: 40°43′N 48°07′E

Zoğallıq is a village and municipality in the Ismailli Rayon of Azerbaijan. It has a population of 436.
