= Abdullah Balak =

- Born: 1938; Şanlıurfa, Turkey
- Died: 2017 (aged 78–79) Şanlıurfa, Turkey
- Genres: Ottoman classical music Turkish makam music
- Occupation: composer

Abdullah Balak (born February 3, 1938 - died February 25, 2017) taught at a number of schools and was a professor at Harran University, Department of Music. He was closely acquainted with prominent musicians of his period. Balak is notable for his knowledge of the music traditions and makams of Urfa. He has also worked on the compilation, categorization and instruction of folk dances, and received numerous awards from various organizations for his wide range of achievements.

== Compositions ==
1. Felek sen ne feleksen
2. Dağıdır yar dağıdır.
3. Çağırdım bağ içinde
4. Öz yurdum Urfa’da garibem
5. Bülbül
6. Urfalıdır benim yar
7. Türkmendim rışvan oldum
8. Kardaş dala konaram
9. Seherden uyanasan
10. Yarımın adı yaşar
11. Urfanın altı bağlar
12. Başında yazma var
13. Fadile
14. Bülbül
15. Ceylan
16. Bala ceylan
17. Eyübün sabrı gelini
18. Uykumdan seher uyandım
19. Ah yar elinden
20. Bülbülün bitmez çilesi
21. Pencere bizde taka
22. Urfa nın yolu bağdır
23. Eminem
24. Haticem
25. Cemilem
26. Baba ben dervişmiyem
27. Ben sıkmalı al isterim
28. Endim kuyun dibine

== Compilations ==
1. Kara çadırın kızı
2. Portakal dilim dilim
3. Kımıl
4. Endim kuyun dibine

== See also ==
- List of composers of classical Turkish music
