= Jan Hron =

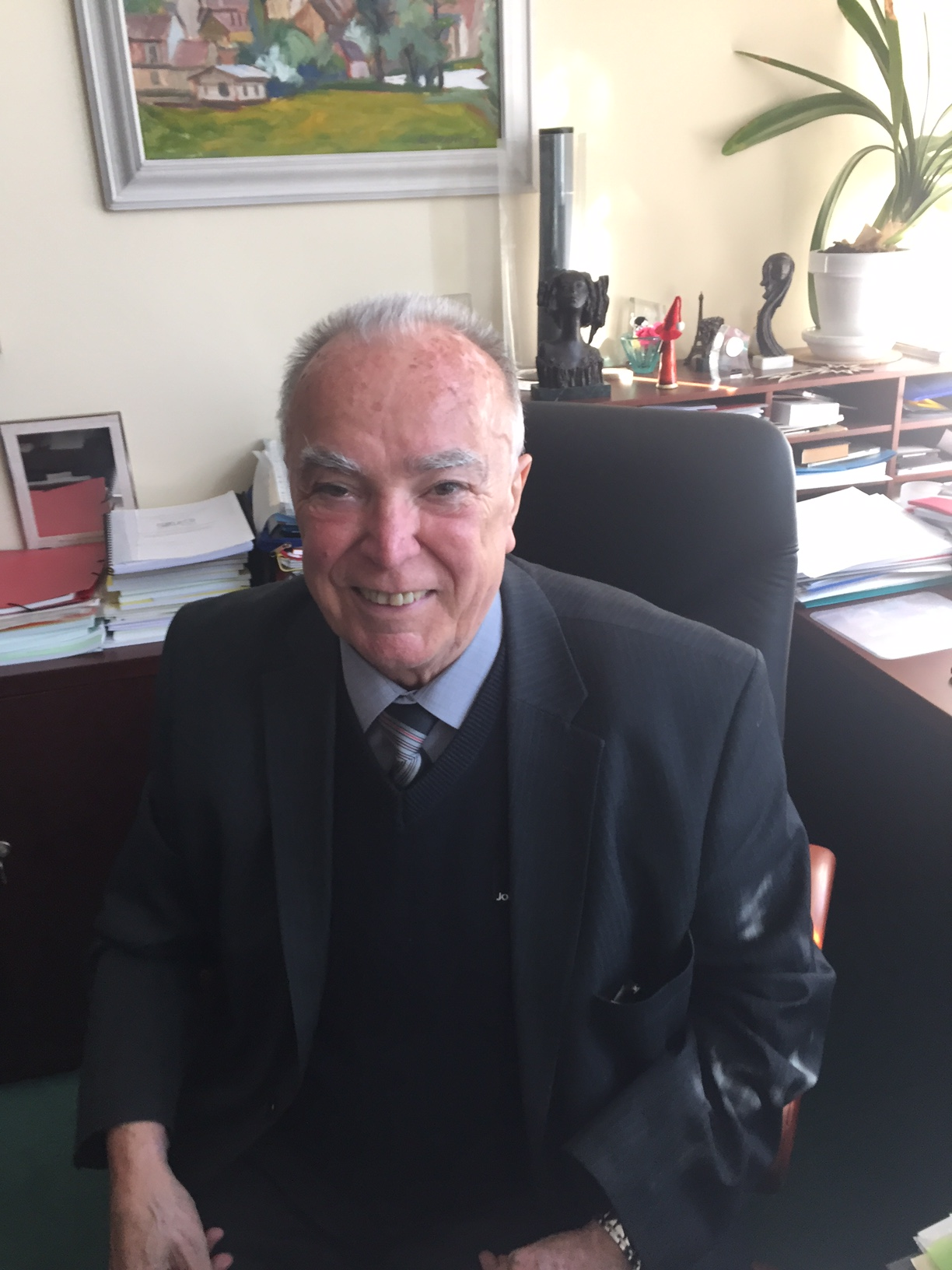
- Hron in 2016
- Born: 17 September 1941 (age 85)
- Occupations: University Professor and former Rector of the Czech University of Life Sciences Prague (CULS)
- Organization: Czech Academy of Agricultural Sciences (President)

Jan Hron (born 1941) is a Czech agroscientist, University Professor and former Rector of the Czech University of Life Sciences Prague (CULS).

== Biography ==
Hron was born on September 17, 1941; he is married and has two children. Former Rector of the Czech University of Life Sciences Prague (CULS), and three times Dean of the Faculty of Economics & Management (CULS)

== Education ==
- 1955–1959 High School of Agricultural Technology in Klatovy – Czech Republic
- 1959–1964 Graduate Studies at the University of Agriculture Prague, Faculty of Economics & Management, concluded with the title Ing.
- 1969 Received academic title CSc (Candidate of Science). Theme of scientific dissertation: "Qualified management models in agricultural enterprises".
- 1977 Received academic title Docent (Associated Professor). Theme of the nomination dissertation: "Analysis and projects for organisational systems in agricultural enterprises".
- 1988 Received academic title DrSc (Doctor of Sciences) from the University of Economics Prague. Theme of scientific dissertation: "Organisational systems in agricultural enterprises".
- 1989 Received academic title Professor, University of Agriculture Prague

== Professional career ==
- 1977–1988 Assistant Professor, Department of Management, Faculty of Economics & Management, CUA Prague
- 1984 – Present Head of Department of Management, Faculty of Economics & Management, CUA Prague
- 1985–1989 Vice Dean for science and research, Faculty of Economics & Management, CUA Prague
- 1989–Present Professor, Department of Management, Faculty of Economics & Management, CUA Prague
- 1990–1991 Vice Rector for Science and Research, CUA Prague
- 1991–1994 Dean of Faculty of Economics & Management, CUA Prague
- 1994–2000 Rector of CUA Prague
- 2000–2003 Dean of Faculty of Economics & Management, CUA Prague
- 2003–2009 Rector of CUA Prague (as of 1.1.2007 Czech University of Life Sciences Prague, CULS Prague)
- 2010–2014 Dean of Faculty of Economics and Management, CULS Prague
- 2015- to day Professor of Economics and Management at the CULS Prague

== Memberships ==
Scientific Boards, Societies, Conferences, Associations

- President of Czech Academy of Agricultural Sciences (Head of subject areas economics, management, sociology and informatics sections).
- Member in more than 12 HEI Scientific Boards across the Czech Republic
- Member of editorial board in Czech scientific periodical "Agricultural Economics"; & "Blue Rose" - IBM
- Member of the Rectors Conference of the Czech Republic.
- Member of the Czech Association for research and application of case studies
- Member of Engineering Academy of Czech republic
- Member of World Association for Case Method Research & Case Method Application (WACRA)
- Member of European Association for International Education
- Member and contact person in Czech Republic of the European Association of Agricultural Economists (EAAE)
- Member of Accreditation Commission for Economics in HEI Czech Republic
- Member of Academic Conference of the Czech Academy of Science
- Member of advisory board to the Ministry of Agriculture Czech Republic
- Member of more than 10 Scientific Commissions & Foundations throughout the Czech Republic and Europe

== Publications ==
352 scientific and scholarly works, including 63 research papers, 45 textbooks and lecture notes and 38 international titles.

== Honorary Degrees ==
- 1994 Honorary doctor degree from University of Plymouth, UK
- 1995 Honorary doctor degree from Agrarian University Georgia, Tbilisi, Georgia
- 1996 Ministry of Education and Sports of Czech Republic National Award
- 2001 Honorary doctor degree from Agricultural University Nitra, Slovakia
- 2002 Honorary doctor degree from Humboldt Universität zu Berlin
- 2005 Honorary doctor degree from National University Ucayali, Peru
- 2005 Honorary doctor degree from Peruvian Union University, Peru
- 2005 Honorary doctor degree from The Royal Scientific Society, Jordan
