= Balaka Cineworld =

Movie theater in Bangladesh

Balaka
- বলাকা

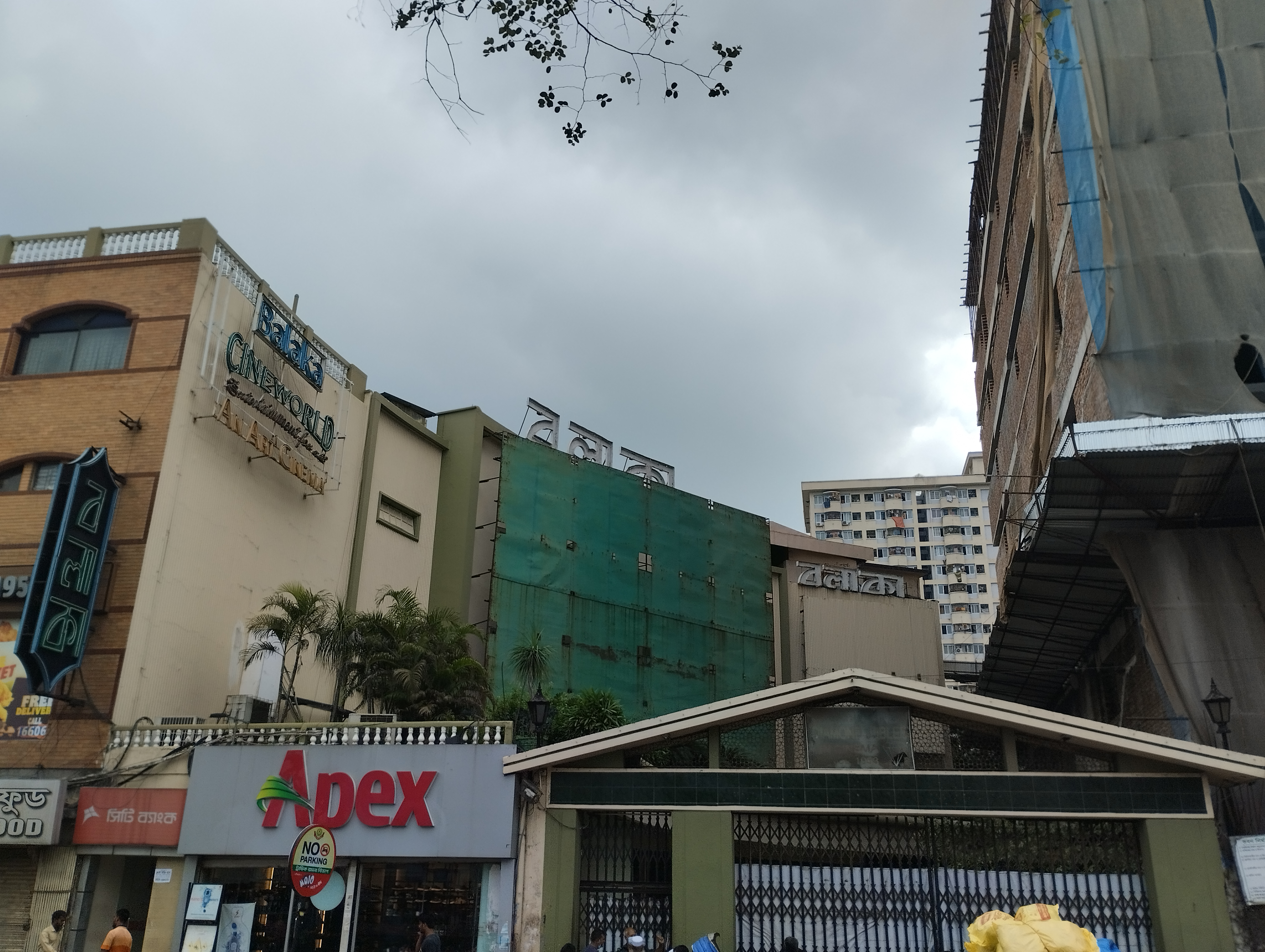
- Balaka in 2022
- Interactive map of Balaka
- Full name: Balaka Cineworld
- Address: New Market, Mirpur Road; Dhaka; Bangladesh
- Coordinates: 23.7334°N 90.3851°E
- Owner: Hasan Movies Limited
- Capacity: 1011
- Type: Movie theater
- Screen: 1

Construction
- Opened: 1 May 1964
- Closed: 20 March 2020

Balaka was a movie theater located in New Market, Dhaka, Bangladesh. Balaka Cineworld, one of the oldest movie theaters in the country, was closed on 20 March 2020 for COVID-19 epidemic.

== History ==
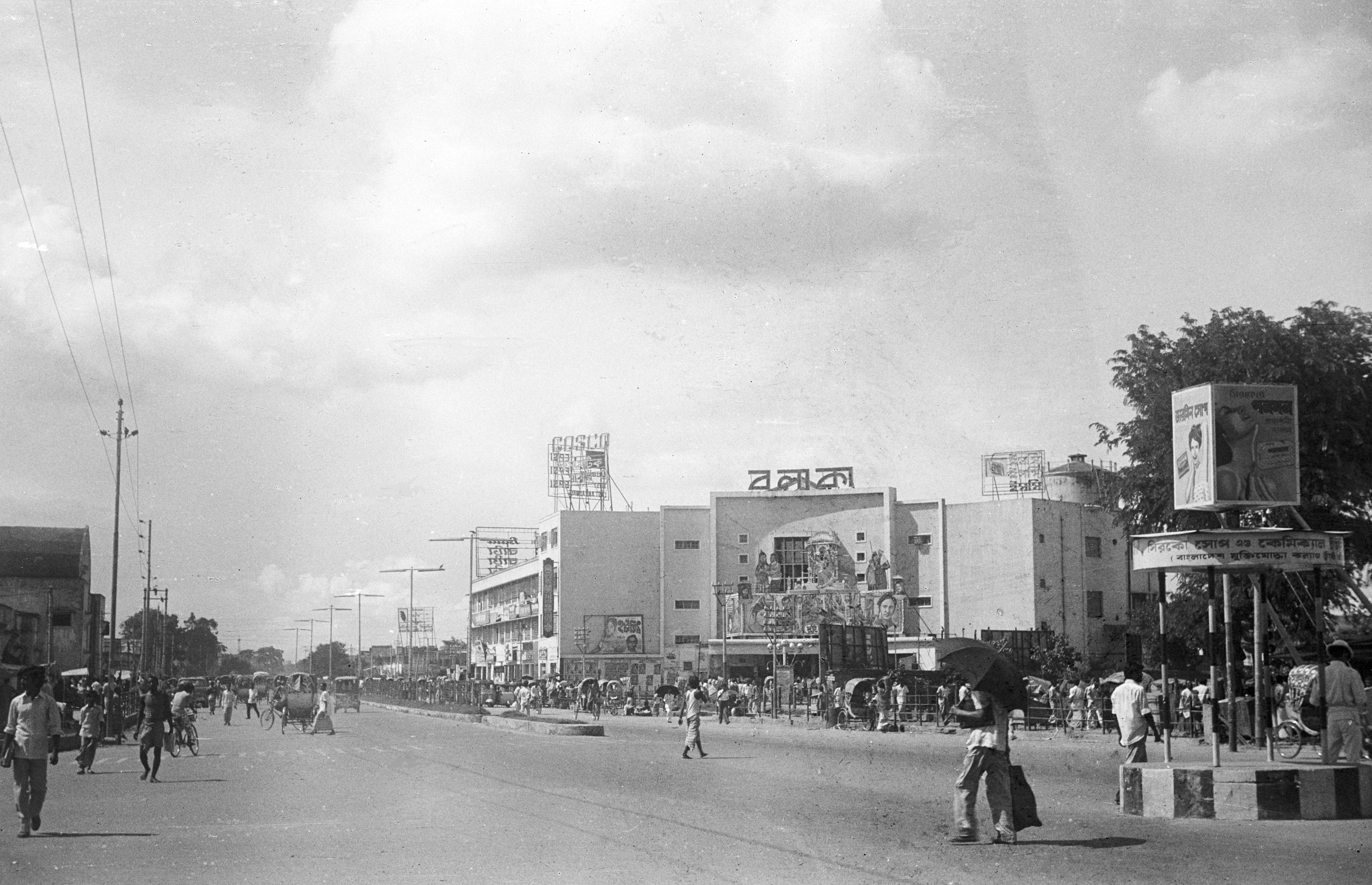
Balaka in 1975

Balaka was established by MA Hasan in Dacca, the capital of East Bengal. East Pakistan Communications minister Khwaja Hassan Askari opened the new cinema hall on 23 April 1964. Screenings began a week later, on 1 May. The inaugural film was Dui Diganta. In 2016, the manager of the cinema said, without explanation, that its history went back to 27 August 1951.

After Hasan's death in the 1970s, the movie theater was owned and operated by his heirs. In 1985, a branch theater of Balaka Cineworld, Balaka-2, was established. Balaka was first modernized in 2001. In 2015, the second Balaka was closed due to lack of customers. The digital theater system was first introduced in the country at Balaka Cineworld.

On 7 November 2019, after the death of Mohammad Hasan Ali Imam, managing director of Hasan Movies Limited, a conflict arose between his two wives and children over the ownership of the movie theater. In such a situation Mohammad Hossain, the son-in-law of the Imam's daughter, was given the responsibility of managing the movie theater. Balaka Cineworld closed on 20 March 2020 due to the COVID-19 pandemic. Balaka could not be opened due to monetary loss of ৳30 lakh during the lockdown and legacy issues of the movie theater.

== Features ==
The movie theater had 1011 seats. Four shows were held there daily.
