= Suchdol (Prague) =

- Municipal District of Prague
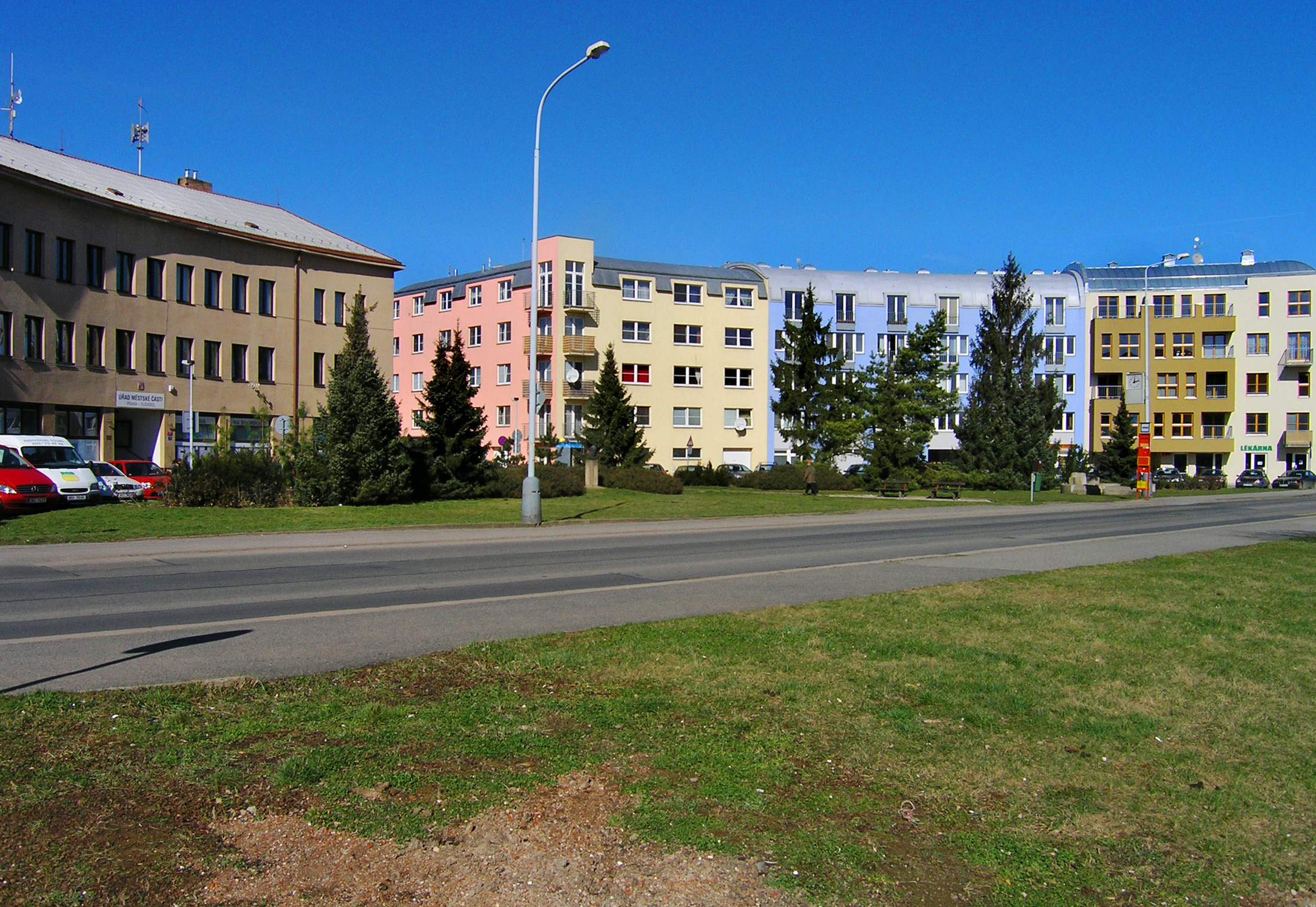
- Suchdol Square

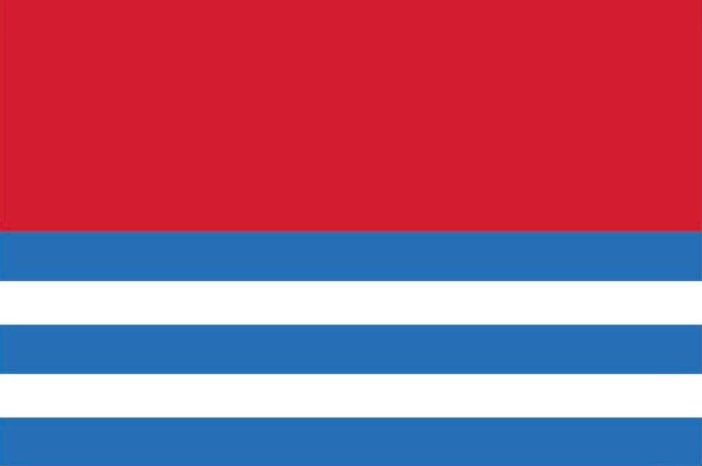
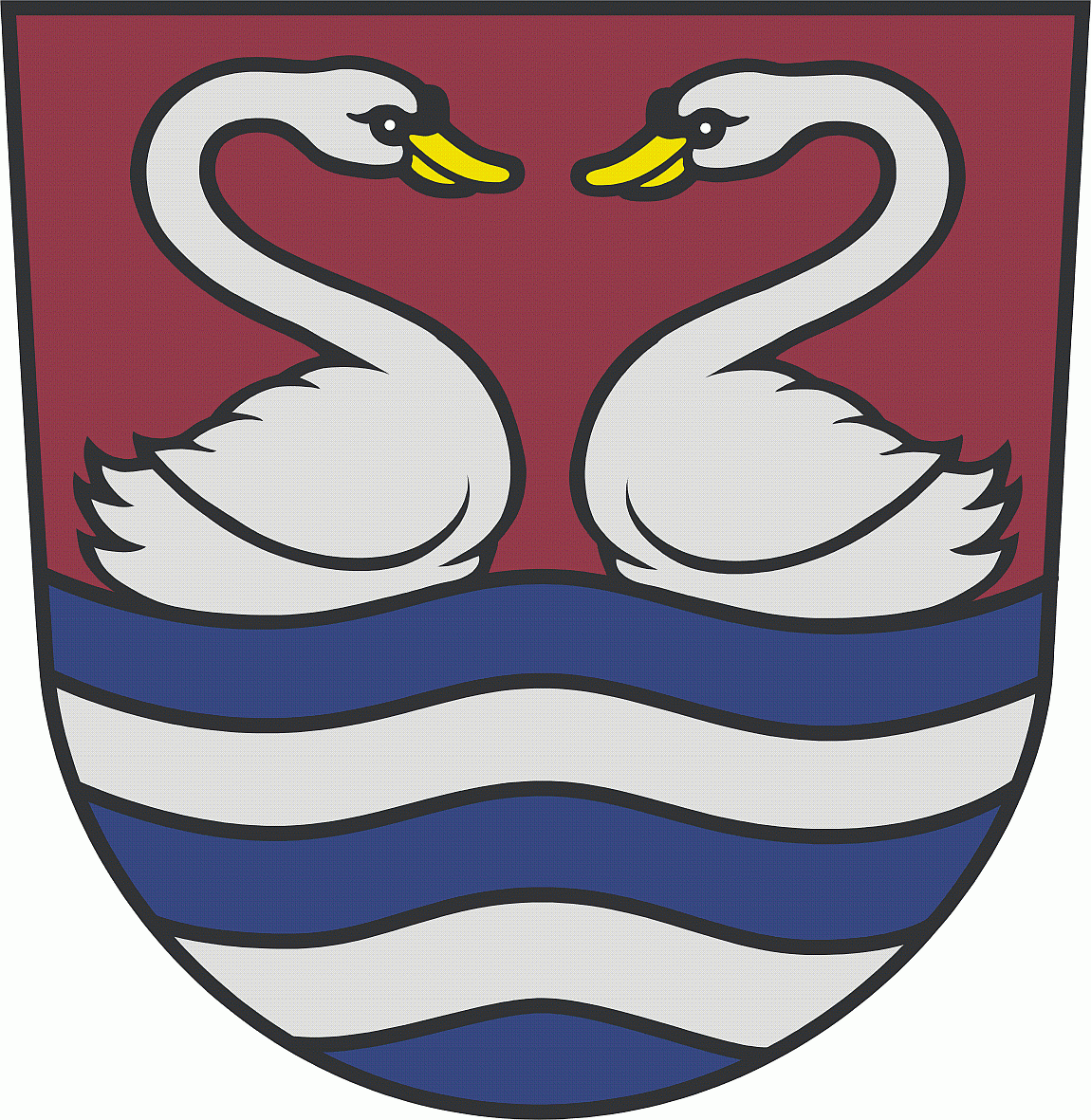
- Flag Coat of arms
- Interactive map of Suchdol
- Coordinates: 50°8′8″N 14°22′43″E
- Country: Czech Republic
- Region: Prague
- District: Prague 6

Area
  - Total: 4.31 km^{2} (1.66 sq mi)

Population (2021)
  - Total: 6,839
  - Density: 1,590/km^{2} (4,110/sq mi)
- Time zone: UTC+1 (CET)
  - Summer (DST): UTC+2 (CEST)

Suchdol is a municipal district (městská část) in Prague, Czech Republic.

== History ==
The first written mention of Suchdol is from 1045. On the land stands a court, owned by a cluster of Benedict virgins belonging under the Saint George Court at Hradcany.

== Demographics ==
Historical population
Year	Pop.	±%
1869	346	—
1880	426	+23.1%
1890	518	+21.6%
1900	747	+44.2%
1910	960	+28.5%
1921	924	−3.7%
1930	2,475	+167.9%
1950	3,850	+55.6%
1961	4,297	+11.6%
1970	5,006	+16.5%
1980	5,012	+0.1%
1991	4,697	−6.3%
2001	4,965	+5.7%
2011	6,982	+40.6%
2021	6,839	−2.0%
Source: Censuses
