= Balik, Azerbaijan =

Balik
- Location within Azerbaijan
- Coordinates: 40°45′33″N 48°04′20″E
- Country: Azerbaijan
- Rayon: Ismailli
- Municipality: Quşəncə
- Time zone: UTC+4 (AZT)
  - Summer (DST): UTC+5 (AZT)

Balik (also, Valyk and Balık) is a village in the Ismailli Rayon of Azerbaijan. The village forms part of the municipality of Quşəncə.
