= Balek =

Balek بالك
- Village
- Location within Iran
- Coordinates: 35°28′17″N 46°14′03″E
- Country: Iran
- Province: Kurdistan
- County: Marivan
- Bakhsh: Central
- Rural District: Sarkal

Population (2006)
  - Total: 533
- Time zone: UTC+3:30 (IRST)
  - Summer (DST): UTC+4:30 (IRDT)

Balek (Persian: بالك, also Romanized as Bālek and Bālak; also known as Bālīk) is a village in Sarkal Rural District, in the Central District of Marivan County, Kurdistan Province, Iran. At the 2006 census, its population was 533, in 125 families. The village is populated by Kurds.
