= Slovak University of Agriculture =

Public university in Nitra, Slovakia

Coordinates: 48°18′53″N 18°5′15″E

- Slovenská poľnohospodárska univerzita
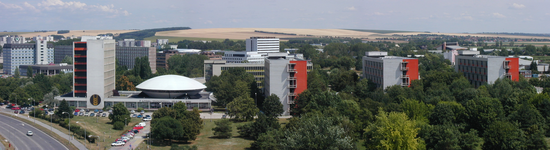
- Slovak University of Agriculture campus
- Motto: My green university
- Type: Public
- Rector: doc. Ing. Klaudia Halázsová, PhD. Dr.h.c. prof. Ing. Peter Bielik, PhD.
- Location: Nitra, Slovakia
- Website: https://www.uniag.sk/

University rankings

Regional – Overall
- QS Emerging Europe and Central Asia: 159 (2022)

Slovak University of Agriculture in Nitra is a public university in Nitra, Slovakia. It offers Bachelor's, Engineer's (Master's), and Doctoral degrees in six faculties:

- Faculty of Agrobiology and Food Resources
- Faculty of Biotechnology and Food Sciences
- Faculty of Economics and Management
- Faculty of Agricultural Engineering
- Faculty of European Studies and Regional Development
- Faculty of Horticulture and Landscape Engineering
