= List of old waterbodies of the Rhine =

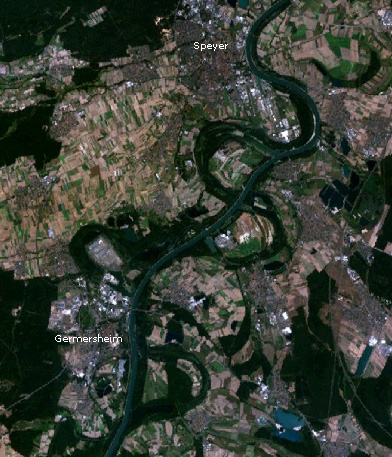
Rhine with old waterbodies between Germersheim and Speyer (looking downstream); both in Rhineland-Palatinate (left) with Baden-Württemberg (right)

This list of old waterbodies of the Rhine contains a selection of ox-bow lakes and meanders of the River Rhine which go under various names that mean Old Rhine or Old Arm [of the Rhine]: Alter Rhein, Altrhein, Altrheinarm, Altrheinzug, Altarm, Rheinaltarm or Restrhein. Artificially created waterbodies, such as quarry ponds, e.g. the Altrheinsee, which may be confused with old branches of the Rhine, are mentioned in the section Waterbodies linked to the Rhine.

As a result of natural translocation, the ox-bows and meanders of the Rhine riverbed remain as side arms of the New Rhine (Neurhein); others were cut off as a result of artificial river canalisation, such as in the wake of the canalisation of the Rhine (Rheinbegradigung) from 1817 under the direction of Johann Gottfried Tulla. These old waters, together with the New Rhine, circumscribe islands or peninsulas. The old river courses have mostly lost their water-bearing link to the New Rhine. Many lie within nature reserves, offer breeding sites for water birds or act as washlands during flooding. Sometimes they are used by canoeists or anglers.

== Old Rhine waterbodies ==
Locating old Rhine waterbodies in the list: Some names of old Rhine waterbodies include the name of a nearby town or village; others do not. In order to make it easy to find in every case, the nearby settlement is usually written in alphabetical order and italics before each waterbody name as a means of locating it. Next, the coordinates of the waterbody and its position on the Rhine (l/r = left/right) follow, then comes either the waterbody name itself in normal lettering, as well as other names of the waterbody in italics. Or there may just be a reference to the name of another place name behind the town name, under which the river is listed in italics.

=== Altarm ===
see also (below) → Rheinaltarm

- near Bad Honnef:
  Altarm (Bad Honnef) (50°38′22.8″N 7°13′5″E; r), between Bad Honnef and the Rhine island of Grafenwerth, Rhein-Sieg-Kreis, North Rhine-Westphalia
- near Auenheim:
  near Auenheim, Ortenaukreis, Baden-Württemberg:
  - Altarm (Auenheim) (48°37′02.2″N 7°50′34.6″E; r)
  - Altarm Sportplatz (48°36′41.1″N 7°49′42.7″E; r)

=== Alter Rhein ===
in the canton of St. Gallen (Switzerland) and in the state of Vorarlberg (Austria) – old arms of the Alpine Rhine:

- Alter Rhein (Diepoldsauer Durchstich) (47°22′39.3″N 9°40′13.5″E; r), near Diepoldsau and Hohenems; formed by the Diepoldsauer Durchstich
- Alter Rhein (Fußacher Durchstich) (47°28′14.2″N 9°36′32″E; r), near St. Margrethen, Höchst, Rheineck, Gaißau and Altenrhein; formed by the Fußacher Durchstich

in Germany:

- near Rheinberg;
  see below → near Rheinberg
- near Xanten;
  see below → near Xanten

=== Altrhein ===
numerous old Rhine waterbodies:

- near Altlußheim;
  see below → near Speyer
- near Altrip;
  see below → near Neuhofen
- near Astheim;
  see below → near Ginsheim
- bei Au am Rhein:
  Auer Altrhein (48°57′46″N 8°14′38″E; r), near Au am Rhein, county of Rastatt, Baden-Württemberg;
  see also (below) → near Auer old arms of the Rhine
- near Baumberg;
  see below → near Urdenbach
- near Berghausen:
  Berghäuser Altrhein (49°17′12.7″N 8°25′58.8″E; l), near Berghausen, Rhein-Pfalz-Kreis, Rhineland-Palatinate
- near Bienen;
  see below → near Rees
- near Birten;
  see below → near Xanten
- near Breisach:
  see below → Altrhein or Restrhein
- near Daxlanden;
  see below → near Karlsruhe
- near Dornick;
  see below → near Rees
- near Eggenstein-Leopoldshafen:
  near Eggenstein-Leopoldshafen, county of Karlsruhe, Baden-Württemberg:
  - Altrhein (Eggenstein-Leopoldshafen) (49°5′34.6″N 8°21′27.9″E; r), near Eggenstein and Leopoldshafen
  - Altrhein (Eggenstein) (49°4′53″N 8°22′0″E; r), near Eggenstein
  - Eggensteiner Altrhein (49°5′21″N 8°22′48″E; r), Rheinniederung Canal, near Eggenstein and Leopoldshafen
- near Eich;
  see below → Eicher See and below → near Gimbsheim
- bei Elchesheim-Illingen:
  near Elchesheim-Illingen, county of Rastatt, Baden-Württemberg:
  - Altrhein (Elchesheim) (48°55′26″N 8°11′33.3″E; r), near Elchesheim
  - Illinger Altrhein (48°56′39″N 8°11′49″E; r), near Illingen;
    see also (below) → near Steinmauern
- near Emmerich am Rhein;
  see below → near Rees
- near Erfelden;
  see below → near Stockstadt/Erfelden
- near Esserden;
  see below → near Rees
- near Flüren:
  Flürener Altrhein (51°40′2″N 6°32′30″E; r), near Flüren (Wesel), Kreis Wesel, North Rhine-Westphalia
- bei Gimbsheim:
  Gimbsheimer Altrhein (Eich-Gimbsheimer Altrhein) (49°45′7″N 8°22′3″E; l), between Eich and Gimbsheim, county of Alzey-Worms, Rhineland-Palatinate
  see also (below) → Altrheinsee and (below) → Eicher See
- bei Ginsheim:
  Ginsheimer Altrhein (49°57′0.5″N 8°21′9.8″E; r), near Ginsheim-Gustavsburg and near Astheim (Trebur), Kreis Groß-Gerau, Hessen
- near Giriz;
  see below → near Giriz (Rheinaltarm)
- bei Grauelsbaum:
  nahe Grauelsbaum (Lichtenau), county of Rastatt, Baden-Württemberg (looking down the Rhine):
  see also (below) → near Greffern
  - Altrheinarm Kirchhöfel (48°44′56″N 7°58′37.2″E; r)
  - Altrheinzug (Grauelsbaum) (48°45′19″N 7°58′54.2″E; r)
- near Gernsheim;
  see below → near Groß-Rohrheim
- bei Greffern:
  nahe Greffern (Rheinmünster), county of Rastatt, Baden-Württemberg (looking down the Rhine):
  see also (above) → near Grauelsbaum
  - Altrhein 1 (Greffern) (Entenloch) (48°45′31.8″N 7°59′15.4″E; r)
  - Altrhein 2 (Greffern) (48°45′27″N 7°59′43″E; r)
- near Griethausen;
  see below → near Kleve
- near Groß-Rohrheim:
  Hammerauer Altrhein (49°43′53.5″N 8°27′15.5″E; r), in the reserve of Hammer Aue von Gernsheim und Groß-Rohrheim, near Groß-Rohrheim and Gernsheim, Bergstraße, Hesse
- near Hagenbach:
  near/nahe Hagenbach, county of Germersheim, Rhineland-Palatinate:
  - Hagenbacher Altrhein (49°1′43″N 8°15′28″E; l), near Hagenbach
  - Insel Nauas Altrhein (49°0′47″N 8°17′25″E; l), near Hagenbach
- near Heidesheim:
  Altrhein Haderaue (50°1′11″N 8°8′37″E; l), near Heidesheim am Rhein, county of Mainz-Bingen, Rhineland-Palatinate
- near Hamm am Rhein;
  see above → near Gimbsheim
- near Hofheim;
  see below → near Lampertheim
- bei Honau;
  see below → near Diersheim: Steinwert-Hot 2 (Altrheinarm)
- bei Hügelsheim:
  near Hügelsheim, county of Rastatt, Baden-Württemberg:
  - Altrhein (Hügelsheim) (48°48′18″N 8°6′15″E; r)
  - Altrheinzug (Hügelsheim) (48°48′25″N 8°6′12.5″E; r)
- near Ilverich:
  Ilvericher Altrheinschlinge (51°16′33″N 6°40′6″E; l), near Meerbusch, Strümp and Ilverich, Rhein-Kreis Neuss, North Rhine-Westphalia
- near Jockgrim:
  near Jockgrim, county of Germersheim, Rhineland-Palatinate;
  see also (below) → near Wörth am Rhein
  - Altrhein südlich Jockgrim (49°4′19″N 8°17′12″E; l), an and teils auf Grenze zu Wörth am Rhein
  - Altrhein Hörnel (Hörnel-Altrhein) (49°4′50″N 8°19′41″E; l), by the Rhine island of Hörnel, aber in the Gebiet from Wörth am Rhein
- bei Karlsruhe:
  im Gebiet the kreisfreien Stadt Karlsruhe, Baden-Württemberg (looking down the Rhine):
  see also (below) → Knielinger See
  - Rappenwörter Altrhein (48°59′56.5″N 8°18′46.4″E; r), near Karlsruhe-Daxlanden
  - Altrhein Kleiner Bodensee (49°4′10″N 8°21′28″E; r), in the NSG Altrhein Kleiner Bodensee, near Neureut, near Ölhäfen
- near Knielingen;
  see below → Knielinger See
- near Kellen;
  see below → near Kleve
- near Ketsch:
  Ketscher Altrhein (49°22′31″N 8°31′34.7″E; r), near Ketsch, Rhein-Neckar-Kreis, Baden-Württemberg
- near Kleve:
  near Kleve, Kleve, North Rhine-Westphalia:
  - Kellener Altrhein (51°47′30″N 6°11′24″E; l), near Kellen
  - Griethauser Altrhein (51°49′58″N 6°7′43″E; l), near Griethausen
- near Klein-Rohrheim;
  see above → near Groß-Rohrheim
- bei Lampertheim: near Lampertheim, Kreis Bergstraße, Hessen:
  - Lampertheimer Altrhein (49°36′10″N 8°27′8″E; r), in the NSG Lampertheimer Altrhein, near Lampertheim and Biblis
  - Maulbeerauer Altrhein (Hofheimer Altrhein, Nordheimer Altrhein) (49°40′3.5″N 8°22′57″E; r), near the Rhine island of Maulbeeraue, near Hofheim (Lampertheim) and Hofheim (Biblis)
- bei Leimersheim: near Leimersheim and Neupotz, county of Germersheim, Rhineland-Palatinate (looking down the Rhine):
  - Altrhein near Neupotz (49°6′49″N 8°19′26″E; l)
  - Altrhein Leimersheim (49°8′4″N 8°21′24″E; l)
- near Lingenfeld:
  Lingenfelder Altrhein (49°15′15″N 8°21′40″E; l), near Lingenfeld, county of Germersheim, Rhineland-Palatinate
- near Linkenheim-Hochstetten:
  Altrhein Insel Rott (49°9′3″N 8°22′56″E; r), by the island of Rott, near Linkenheim-Hochstetten, Karlsruhe, Baden-Württemberg
- near Ludwigshafen am Rhein;
  see below → near Roxheim
- near Mannheim:
  im Gebiet the kreisfreien Stadt Mannheim, Baden-Württemberg:
  - Altrhein Backofen (49°24′48″N 8°30′2″E; r), near Rheinauhafen
  - Mannheimer Altrhein (Waldhofer / Sandhofer Altrhein) (49°31′20″N 8°28′12″E; r), with Mannheimer Altrheinhafen and Industriehafen, near the Friesenheimer Insel and den Stadtteilen Waldhof and Sandhofen sowie in the Stadtbezirk and Stadtteil Neckarstadt-West
  - Altrhein Sandhofen-Ballauf (49°33′37″N 8°25′2″E; r), near Sandhofen
- near Märkt:
  Altrhein Märkt (47°37′32″N 7°34′46.5″E; r; with Krebsbach), near Märkt (Weil am Rhein), Lörrach, Baden-Württemberg;
  see also (below) → Altrhein or Restrhein
- near Marlen:
  near Marlen (Kehl), Ortenaukreis, Baden-Württemberg:
  - Altrhein Fischerkopf (48°31′38″N 7°48′38″E; r)
  - Altrhein Saurheinkopf (48°31′25″N 7°48′38″E; r)
- near Maxau;
  see below → Knielinger See
- near Maximiliansau;
  see above → near Hagenbach and below → near Wörth am Rhein
- near Mechtersheim:
  Mechtersheimer Altrhein (49°15′24″N 8°25′0″E; l), near Mechtersheim (Römerberg), Rhein-Pfalz-Kreis, Rhineland-Palatinate
- near Meerbusch;
  see above → near Ilverich
- near Mutterstadt;
  see below → near Roxheim
- near Neuhofen:
  Neuhofener Altrhein (Neuhöfer Altrhein) (49°25′30.1″N 8°27′13.1″E; l), between Altrip and Neuhofen, Rhein-Pfalz-Kreis, Rhineland-Palatinate
- near Neupotz;
  see above → near Leimersheim
- near Neureut;
  see above → near Karlsruhe
- near Nordheim;
  see above → near Lampertheim
- near Oberhausen;
  see below → near Philippsburg
- near Oggersheim;
  see below → near Roxheim
- near Ossenberg;
  see below → near Rheinberg
- near Ottenheim:
  Altrhein Lech (48°22′47″N 7°44′16″E; r), near Ottenheim, Ortenaukreis, Baden-Württemberg
- near Otterstadt:
  near Otterstadt, Rhein-Pfalz-Kreis, Rhineland-Palatinate (looking down the Rhine):
  - Angelhofer Altrhein (49°21′33″N 8°28′13″E; l), near Otterstadt and in the Gebiet the kreisfreien Stadt Speyer;
    see also (below) → near Speyer
  - Otterstädter Altrhein (49°23′16″N 8°27′53″E; l), near Otterstadt and Waldsee
- bei Philippsburg:
  Philippsburger Altrhein (49°14′50″N 8°27′53″E; r), near Philippsburg, county of Karlsruhe, Baden-Württemberg
- near Plittersdorf:
  near Plittersdorf (Rastatt), Rastatt, Baden-Württemberg (looking down the Rhine):
  - Altrhein Plittersdorf (48°52′36″N 8°8′3″E; r)
  - Altrheinarm (Plittersdorf) (48°52′36″N 8°8′47″E; r)
  - Altrhein (Plittersdorf) (48°54′5″N 8°9′18″E; r)
- near Praest;
  see below → near Rees
- bei Rees:
  near Rees and Emmerich am Rhein, Kreis Kleve, North Rhine-Westphalia:
  - Bienener Altrhein!--???Nr--> (51°48′36″N 6°21′30″E; r), near Esserden, Bienen, Praest and Dornick
  - Grietherorter Altrhein (51°48′9″N 6°20′9″E; r), near Grietherort
  - Reeser Altrhein (51°45′36″N 6°25′29″E; r), near Haffen and Rees
- near Rheinau;
  see below → near Diersheim: Steinwert-Hot 2 (Altrheinarm), below → near Freistett, below → near Helmlingen and above → near Honau
- near Rheinberg:
  Rheinberger Altrhein (Alter Rhein) (51°33′45″N 6°35′13.5″E; l), near Rheinberg and Ossenberg, Kreis Wesel, North Rhine-Westphalia
- near Rheinhausen;
  see above → near Philippsburg
- near Rheinsheim;
  see above → near Philippsburg
- near Riburg;
  see below → near Riburg (Rheinaltarm)
- bei Roxheim:
  Roxheimer Altrhein (49°26′51.5″N 8°21′38.7″E/49°34′24″N 8°22′11″E/49°35′39.8″N 8°24′46.4″E; l), from Mutterstadt inter alia through Ludwigshafen am Rhein to Roxheim, Rhein-Pfalz-Kreis, Rhineland-Palatinate:
  see also (below) → Silbersee
  - Hinterer Roxheimer Altrhein (49°34′17″N 8°23′0″E; l), near Roxheim
  - Vorderer Roxheimer Altrhein (49°34′32″N 8°22′10″E; l), near Roxheim
- near Rüdlingen;
  see below → near Rüdlingen (Rheinaltarm)
- near Rußheim:
  Rußheimer Altrhein (49°12′4″N 8°25′42″E; r), am Elisabethenwörth, with Alter Minthesee, near Rußheim (Dettenheim), Karlsruhe, Baden-Württemberg
- near Sasbach:
  Sasbacher Altrhein (48°8′36.1″N 7°36′34.2″E; r), near Sasbach am Kaiserstuhl, county of Emmendingen, Baden-Württemberg
- near Scherzheim:
  Altrhein (Scherzheim) (48°43′13.1″N 7°58′24.5″E; r), near Scherzheim (Lichtenau), county of Rastatt, Baden-Württemberg
- near Sondernheim:
  Michelsbach (Sondernheimer Altrhein) (49°10′50″N 8°21′19″E; l), near Sondernheim, county of Germersheim, Rhineland-Palatinate
- bei Speyer:
  Altlußheimer Altrhein (49°18′24″N 8°28′33″E; l), in the Speyerer Auwald, kreisfreie Stadt Speyer, Rhineland-Palatinate; gegenüber vom baden-württembergischen Altlußheim;
  see also (above) → near Otterstadt and below → Runkedebunk
- bei Steinmauern:
  see below → Goldkanal and see also (above) → near Elchesheim-Illingen
- bei Stockstadt/Erfelden:
  Stockstadt-Erfelder Altrhein (49°49′38″N 8°28′33.5″E; r), in the Kühkopf-Knoblochsaue nature reserve, near Stockstadt and Erfelden, Groß-Gerau, Hesse
- near Strümp;
  see above → near Ilverich
- near Tiengen;
  see below → near Tiengen (Rheinaltarm)
- bei Urdenbach:
  Urdenbacher Altrhein (51°8′36″N 6°53′0″E; r), near Baumberg (Monheim am Rhein) and Urdenbach, Kreis Mettmann and kreisfreie Stadt Düsseldorf, North Rhine-Westphalia
- near Waldsee;
  see above → near Otterstadt
- near Wintersdorf:
  Altrhein Wintersdorf (48°45′39.2″N 8°2′6″E; r), Rheinniederung Canal, near Wintersdorf, county of Rastatt, Baden-Württemberg
- bei Wörth am Rhein:
  Wörther Altrhein (49°3′23″N 8°16′17″E; l), near Wörth am Rhein, county of Germersheim, Rhineland-Palatinate;
  see also (above) → near Jockgrim
- bei Xanten:
  Xantener Altrhein (Alter Rhein) (51°37′57″N 6°29′26″E; l), near Birten and Xanten, Kreis Wesel, North Rhine-Westphalia

=== Altrheinarm ===
- Auer Altrheinarme(48°57′46″N 8°14′38″E; r), several old arms of the Rhine near Au am Rhein, county of Rastatt, Baden-Württemberg;
  see also (above) → near Au am Rhein
- Altrheinarm Kirchhöfel;
  see above → near Grauelsbaum
- Altrheinarm Plittersdorf;
  see above → near Plittersdorf
- Altrheinarm (Rheinbischofsheim) (48°40′3.7″N 7°54′33.3″E; r; with the Groschenwasser), near Rheinbischofsheim and Freistett (Rheinau), Ortenaukreis, Baden-Württemberg;
  see also (below) → near Freistett
- Altrheinarme Taubergießen(48°16′27.2″N 7°41′45.8″E; r), several old arms of the Rhine in the Auen- and NSG Taubergießen, inter alia near Rust, Ortenaukreis, Baden-Württemberg
- Steinwert-Hot 2 (Altrheinarm) (48°39′4.5″N 7°52′23.3″E; r), near Diersheim and Honau (Rheinau), Ortenaukreis, Baden-Württemberg

=== Altrhein or Restrhein ===
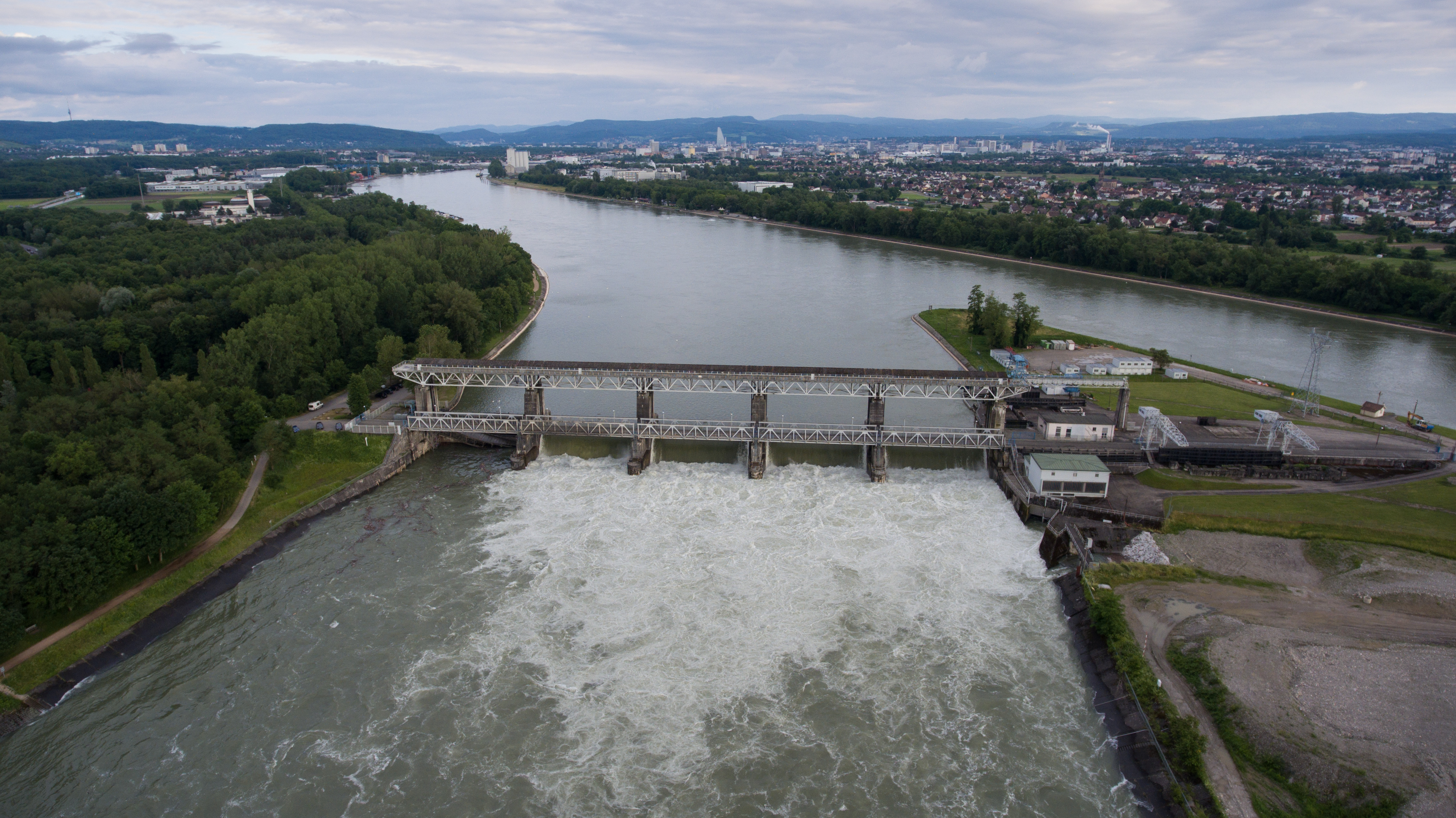
Branch-off point of the Grand Canal d'Alsace from the South Baden Old Rhine at Stauwehr Märkt (from north). Front right: southern end of the Île du Rhin, rear: Basel (Switzerland)

Section of the River Rhine called the Altrhein or Restrhein parallel to the 52.7-kilometre-long Grand Canal d'Alsace (Rheinseitenkanal), between the Stauwehr Märkt (47°37′2″N 7°34′24″E; Weil am Rhein; Lörrach, Baden-Württemberg; Germany) and Village-Neuf (department of Haut-Rhin; France) and the Kulturwehr Breisach (48°1′57″N 7°34′12″E; Breisgau-Hochschwarzwald, Baden-Württemberg; Germany) and Volgelsheim (department of Haut-Rhin; France) running as a border river;
see also (above) → near Märkt

=== Altrheinschlinge ===
- Ilvericher Altrheinschlinge;
  see above → near Ilverich

=== Altrheinzug ===
- Altrheinzug (Grauelsbaum);
  see above → near Grauelsbaum
- Altrheinzug (Hügelsheim);
  see above → near Hügelsheim
- Durchgehender Altrheinzug (r), east along the Rhine, Baden-Württemberg

=== Restrhein ===
see above → Altrhein or Restrhein

=== Rheinaltarm ===
see also (above) → Altarm

- near Giriz:
  Rheinaltarm Giriz (47°36′15.3″N 8°13′34.3″E; l), near Koblenz AG, canton of Aargau, Switzerland
- bei Riburg:
  Rheinaltarm Riburg (47°35′5.5″N 7°51′32.8″E; l), near Riburg (Möhlin), canton of Aargau, Switzerland
- bei Rüdlingen:
  Rheinaltarm Rüdlingen (47°35′8.5″N 8°34′27.2″E; l), near Rüdlingen, canton of Schaffhausen, Switzerland
- bei Tiengen:
  Rheinaltarm Tiengen (47°36′50.1″N 8°14′32.8″E; r), near Tiengen (Waldshut-Tiengen), county of Waldshut, Baden-Württemberg

=== Special old Rhine waterbodies ===
Waterbodies that are not called e.g. Alter Rhein or Altrhein, but are nevertheless old arms of the Rhine are:

- Die Roos (51°22′31″N 6°41′0″E; l), old arm of the Rhine near Friemersheim and Hohenbudberg, by and in the nature reserve of Rheinaue Friemersheim, in the boroughs of Duisburg and Krefeld, North Rhine-Westphalia
- near Freistett;
  near Freistett (Rheinau), Ortenaukreis, Baden-Württemberg (looking down the Rhine):
  see also (above) → Altrheinarm (Rheinbischofsheim)
  - Bischemer Grund (48°40′3″N 7°54′51.7″E; r)
  - Altwasser am Dreimärkerweg (48°40′14.1″N 7°54′49.3″E; r)
  - Altwasser am Kreuzdammweg (48°40′25″N 7°55′11.9″E; r)
  - Altwasser im Steingrund (48°41′10.3″N 7°56′44.8″E; r)
- bei Helmlingen:
  near Helmlingen (Rheinau), Ortenaukreis, Baden-Württemberg (looking down the Rhine):
  - Hellwasser (48°41′39.6″N 7°57′38.2″E; r), near Helmlingen and Freistett
  - Herrenwasser (48°42′3.7″N 7°57′26.9″E; r)
  - Mittelkopf (48°42′8.5″N 7°57′9.3″E; r)
  - Rubenkopfkehle (48°42′24.2″N 7°57′23.7″E; r)
  - Judenloch (48°42′35.5″N 7°57′9″E; r)
- Niep (Niepkuhlenzug) and angrenzende Kuhlen (51°27′15″N 6°30′6.7″E; l), between the city of Krefeld and Issum in the county of Wesel, North Rhine-Westphalia
- Rheinlöcher/Scheidegraben (49°43′41.5″N 8°25′41.5″E; l), near Ibersheim and Hamm am Rhein, near Ibersheimer Wörth, in the borough of Worms and municipality of Hamm am Rhein, Alzey-Worms, Rhineland Palatinate
- Runkedebunk (49°17′24.7″N 8°27′37.2″E; l), in the Speyerer Auwald, Speyer, Rhineland-Palatinate; near Berghäuser Altrhein and opposite the island of Horn;
  see also (above) → near Speyer

== Waterbodies linked to the Rhine ==
These are artificially created waterbodies alongside the Rhine (such as quarry ponds), which are neither old arms nor tributaries of the Rhine, but which could be confused with such and are directly or indirectly linked to the Rhine. (sorted alphabetically by name):

- Altrheinsee (49°45′33″N 8°24′14″E; l), near Eich, county of Alzey-Worms, Rhineland-Palatinate
  (quarry pond, with very large part of the Gimbsheimer Altrhein)
- Eicher See (49°45′39″N 8°26′46″E; l), near Eich and Hamm am Rhein, county of Alzey-Worms, Rhineland-Palatinate
  (quarry pond with marina including link to the Rhine; formed end of the 20th century)
  see also (above) → near Gimbsheim
- Goldkanal (48°55′22″N 8°10′42″E; r), near Steinmauern and Illingen (Elchesheim-Illingen), county of Rastatt, Baden-Württemberg;
  (old arm of the Rhine massively expanded as a quarry pond)
  see also (above) → near Elchesheim-Illingen
- Knielinger See (49°1′36″N 8°18′42″E; r), near Knielingen and Maxau, in the NSG Altrhein Maxau, in borough of Karlsruhe, Baden-Württemberg
  (quarry pond with small section of old Rhine arm and dredged old Rhine waterbodies)
  see also (above) → near Karlsruhe
- Silbersee (49°34′43″N 8°22′59″E; l), near Roxheim, Rhein-Pfalz-Kreis, Rhineland-Palatinate
  (quarry pond on the inside of the bend of the Vorderen and Hinteren Roxheimer Altrhein)
  see also (above) → near Roxheim

== See also ==
- Oude Rijn (Gelderland)
- Oude Rijn (Utrecht and South Holland)
