= Ludwigshafen/Frankenthal =

Federal electoral district of Germany

206 Ludwigshafen/Frankenthal
- Electoral district for the Bundestag
- Ludwigshafen/Frankenthal in 2025
- State: Rhineland-Palatinate
- Population: 324,200 (2019)
- Electorate: 205,998 (2025)
- Major settlements: Ludwigshafen; Frankenthal; Mutterstadt
- Area: 314.7 km^{2}

Current electoral district
- Created: 1949
- Member: Vacant
- Elected: 2025

Ludwigshafen/Frankenthal is an electoral constituency (German: Wahlkreis) represented in the Bundestag. It elects one member via first-past-the-post voting. Under the current constituency numbering system, it is designated as constituency 206. It is located in southeastern Rhineland-Palatinate, comprising the cities of Ludwigshafen and Frankenthal and the northern part of the Rhein-Pfalz-Kreis district.

Ludwigshafen/Frankenthal was created for the inaugural 1949 federal election. Whilst the Christian Democratic Union won the plurality in the 2025 election, under the new voting system, their candidate did not actually win a seat in the Bundestag. This was due to the distribution of seats won by the CDU being decided by the first (direct) vote percentage of each winning CDU candidate, determining who took the seats. As the CDU candidate got a low vote of 27.1%, the seat will remain vacant throughout the 21st Bundestag.

== Geography ==
Ludwigshafen/Frankenthal is located in southeastern Rhineland-Palatinate. As of the 2021 federal election, it comprises the independent cities of Ludwigshafen and Frankenthal and the municipalities of Bobenheim-Roxheim, Böhl-Iggelheim, Limburgerhof, Mutterstadt, Altrip, and Neuhofen and the Verbandsgemeinden of Dannstadt-Schauernheim, Lambsheim-Heßheim, and Maxdorf from the Rhein-Pfalz-Kreis district.

== History ==
Ludwigshafen/Frankenthal was created in 1949, then known as Ludwigshafen am Rhein. From 1965 through 1998, it was named Ludwigshafen. It acquired its current name in the 2002 election. In the 1949 election, it was Rhineland-Palatinate constituency 11 in the numbering system. In the 1953 through 1961 elections, it was number 158. In the 1965 through 1976 elections, it was number 159. In the 1980 through 1998 elections, it was number 157. In the 2002 election, it was number 210. In the 2005 election, it was number 209. In the 2009 and 2013 elections, it was number 208. In the 2017 and 2021 elections, it was number 207. From the 2025 election, it has been number 206.

Originally, the constituency comprised the cities of Ludwigshafen and Frankenthal, the district of Landkreis Ludwigshafen, and the district of Landkreis Frankenthal excluding the Amtsgerichtsbezirk of Grünstadt. In the 1965 and 1969 elections, it comprised the city of Ludwigshafen and the Landkreis Ludwigshafen district. In the 1972 through 1998 elections, it comprised the city of Ludwigshafen and the municipalities of Altrip, Böhl-Iggelheim, Limburgerhof, Mutterstadt, and Neuhofen and Verbandsgemeinde of Dannstadt-Schauernheim from the Landkreis Ludwigshafen district. It acquired its current borders in the 2002 election.

Election	No.	Name	Borders
1949	11	Ludwigshafen am Rhein	Ludwigshafen city; Frankenthal city; Landkreis Ludwigshafen district; Landkreis Frankenthal district (excluding Grünstadt Amtsgerichtsbezirk)
1953	158	Ludwigshafen am Rhein	Ludwigshafen city; Frankenthal city; Landkreis Ludwigshafen district; Landkreis Frankenthal district (excluding Grünstadt Amtsgerichtsbezirk)
1957	158	Ludwigshafen am Rhein	Ludwigshafen city; Frankenthal city; Landkreis Ludwigshafen district; Landkreis Frankenthal district (excluding Grünstadt Amtsgerichtsbezirk)
1961	158	Ludwigshafen am Rhein	Ludwigshafen city; Frankenthal city; Landkreis Ludwigshafen district; Landkreis Frankenthal district (excluding Grünstadt Amtsgerichtsbezirk)
1965	159	Ludwigshafen	Ludwigshafen city; Landkreis Ludwigshafen district
1969	159	Ludwigshafen	Ludwigshafen city; Landkreis Ludwigshafen district
1972	159	Ludwigshafen	Ludwigshafen city; Landkreis Ludwigshafen district (only Altrip, Böhl-Iggelheim, Limburgerhof, Mutterstadt, and Neuhofen municipalities and Dannstadt-Schauernheim Verbandsgemeinde)
1976	159	Ludwigshafen	Ludwigshafen city; Landkreis Ludwigshafen district (only Altrip, Böhl-Iggelheim, Limburgerhof, Mutterstadt, and Neuhofen municipalities and Dannstadt-Schauernheim Verbandsgemeinde)
1980	157	Ludwigshafen	Ludwigshafen city; Landkreis Ludwigshafen district (only Altrip, Böhl-Iggelheim, Limburgerhof, Mutterstadt, and Neuhofen municipalities and Dannstadt-Schauernheim Verbandsgemeinde)
1983	157	Ludwigshafen	Ludwigshafen city; Landkreis Ludwigshafen district (only Altrip, Böhl-Iggelheim, Limburgerhof, Mutterstadt, and Neuhofen municipalities and Dannstadt-Schauernheim Verbandsgemeinde)
1987	157	Ludwigshafen	Ludwigshafen city; Landkreis Ludwigshafen district (only Altrip, Böhl-Iggelheim, Limburgerhof, Mutterstadt, and Neuhofen municipalities and Dannstadt-Schauernheim Verbandsgemeinde)
1990	157	Ludwigshafen	Ludwigshafen city; Landkreis Ludwigshafen district (only Altrip, Böhl-Iggelheim, Limburgerhof, Mutterstadt, and Neuhofen municipalities and Dannstadt-Schauernheim Verbandsgemeinde)
1994	157	Ludwigshafen	Ludwigshafen city; Landkreis Ludwigshafen district (only Altrip, Böhl-Iggelheim, Limburgerhof, Mutterstadt, and Neuhofen municipalities and Dannstadt-Schauernheim Verbandsgemeinde)
1998	157	Ludwigshafen	Ludwigshafen city; Landkreis Ludwigshafen district (only Altrip, Böhl-Iggelheim, Limburgerhof, Mutterstadt, and Neuhofen municipalities and Dannstadt-Schauernheim Verbandsgemeinde)
2002	210	Ludwigshafen/Frankenthal	Ludwigshafen city; Frankenthal city; Rhein-Pfalz-Kreis district (only Bobenheim-Roxheim, Böhl-Iggelheim, Limburgerhof, and Mutterstadt municipalities and Dannstadt-Schauernheim, Lambsheim-Heßheim, Maxdorf, and Rheinauen (only Altrip and Neuhofen municipalities) Verbandsgemeinden)
2005	209	Ludwigshafen/Frankenthal	Ludwigshafen city; Frankenthal city; Rhein-Pfalz-Kreis district (only Bobenheim-Roxheim, Böhl-Iggelheim, Limburgerhof, and Mutterstadt municipalities and Dannstadt-Schauernheim, Lambsheim-Heßheim, Maxdorf, and Rheinauen (only Altrip and Neuhofen municipalities) Verbandsgemeinden)
2009	208	Ludwigshafen/Frankenthal	Ludwigshafen city; Frankenthal city; Rhein-Pfalz-Kreis district (only Bobenheim-Roxheim, Böhl-Iggelheim, Limburgerhof, and Mutterstadt municipalities and Dannstadt-Schauernheim, Lambsheim-Heßheim, Maxdorf, and Rheinauen (only Altrip and Neuhofen municipalities) Verbandsgemeinden)
2013	208	Ludwigshafen/Frankenthal	Ludwigshafen city; Frankenthal city; Rhein-Pfalz-Kreis district (only Bobenheim-Roxheim, Böhl-Iggelheim, Limburgerhof, and Mutterstadt municipalities and Dannstadt-Schauernheim, Lambsheim-Heßheim, Maxdorf, and Rheinauen (only Altrip and Neuhofen municipalities) Verbandsgemeinden)
2017	207	Ludwigshafen/Frankenthal	Ludwigshafen city; Frankenthal city; Rhein-Pfalz-Kreis district (only Bobenheim-Roxheim, Böhl-Iggelheim, Limburgerhof, and Mutterstadt municipalities and Dannstadt-Schauernheim, Lambsheim-Heßheim, Maxdorf, and Rheinauen (only Altrip and Neuhofen municipalities) Verbandsgemeinden)
2021	207	Ludwigshafen/Frankenthal	Ludwigshafen city; Frankenthal city; Rhein-Pfalz-Kreis district (only Bobenheim-Roxheim, Böhl-Iggelheim, Limburgerhof, and Mutterstadt municipalities and Dannstadt-Schauernheim, Lambsheim-Heßheim, Maxdorf, and Rheinauen (only Altrip and Neuhofen municipalities) Verbandsgemeinden)
2025	206	Ludwigshafen/Frankenthal	Ludwigshafen city; Frankenthal city; Rhein-Pfalz-Kreis district (only Bobenheim-Roxheim, Böhl-Iggelheim, Limburgerhof, and Mutterstadt municipalities and Dannstadt-Schauernheim, Lambsheim-Heßheim, Maxdorf, and Rheinauen (only Altrip and Neuhofen municipalities) Verbandsgemeinden)

== Members ==
The constituency was first represented by Friedrich Wilhelm Wagner of the Social Democratic Party (SPD) from 1949 to 1965. Hans Bardens of the SPD served from 1965 to 1983. Manfred Reimann of the SPD was then representative from 1983 to 1990. The constituency was won by then-Chancellor of Germany Helmut Kohl of the Christian Democratic Union (CDU) in 1990. He was re-elected in 1994. Doris Barnett of the SPD was elected in 1998 and served until 2009. Maria Böhmer won it for the CDU in 2009 and served two terms. Torbjörn Kartes of the CDU was elected in 2017. Christian Schreider was elected for the SPD in 2021. The seat became vacant as a result of the 2025 election.

Election	Member	Party	%
1949	Friedrich Wilhelm Wagner	SPD	43.1
1953	Friedrich Wilhelm Wagner	SPD	43.3
1957	Friedrich Wilhelm Wagner	SPD	45.2
1961	Friedrich Wilhelm Wagner	SPD	47.0
1965	Hans Bardens	SPD	51.1
1969	Hans Bardens	SPD	54.9
1972	Hans Bardens	SPD	58.9
1976	Hans Bardens	SPD	53.1
1980	Hans Bardens	SPD	54.1
1983	Manfred Reimann	SPD	47.7
1987	Manfred Reimann	SPD	46.0
1990	Helmut Kohl	CDU	44.7
1994	Helmut Kohl	CDU	46.0
1998	Doris Barnett	SPD	47.9
2002	Doris Barnett	SPD	47.3
2005	Doris Barnett	SPD	43.4
2009	Maria Böhmer	CDU	38.4
2013	Maria Böhmer	CDU	43.3
2017	Torbjörn Kartes	CDU	32.2
2021	Christian Schreider	SPD	32.8
2025	Vacant (Note: Sertac Bilgin (CDU) won with 27.1% but seat remained vacant due to insufficient second votes cover.)		

== Election results ==
=== 2025 election ===
Under the new voting system implemented for the 2025 election, although the CSU candidate won the most votes in this constituency, due to the low winning percentage, the constituency seat will remain vacant as not enough second (party) votes were won to be allocated this seat.

Federal election (2025): Ludwigshafen/Frankenthal
Notes:	Blue background denotes the winner of the electorate vote. Pink background denotes a candidate elected from their party list. Yellow background denotes an electorate win by a list member, or other incumbent. A ✓ or ✗ denotes status of any incumbent, win or lose respectively.						
Party	Candidate	Votes	%	±%	Party votes	%	±%
CDU	Sertac Bilgin	43,626	27.1	▲2.1	44,478	27.5	▲5.5
AfD	Stefan Scheil	37,119	23.1	▲11.4	37,872	23.4	▲11.6
SPD	✗ Christian Schreider	42,212	26.2	▼6.6	31,416	19.4	▼10.5
Greens	Armin Grau	12,367	7.7	▼3.5	14,377	8.9	▼2.9
Left	Jonas Leibig	7,794	4.8	▲1.8	11,028	6.8	▲3.8
BSW	Jan Mohammad	5,432	3.4	New	7,876	4.9	New
FDP	Eric von Nagel	5,736	3.6	▼5.4	7,095	4.4	▼7.6
FW	Hans Arndt	4,618	2.9	▼2.0	2,871	1.8	▼1.3
Tierschutzpartei					2,194	1.4	▼0.5
Volt	Burak Bağiş	1,481	0.9	New	1,028	0.6	▲0.1
PARTEI					790	0.5	▼0.4
BD	Timo Weber	640	0.4	New	412	0.3	New
ÖDP					180	0.1	0.0
MLPD					45	<0.1	0.0
Informal votes		2,081			1,444		
Total valid votes		161,025			161,662		
Turnout		163,106	79.2	▲5.8			
Vacant gain from SPD	Majority						

=== 2021 election ===
Federal election (2021): Ludwigshafen/Frankenthal
Notes:	Blue background denotes the winner of the electorate vote. Pink background denotes a candidate elected from their party list. Yellow background denotes an electorate win by a list member, or other incumbent. A ✓ or ✗ denotes status of any incumbent, win or lose respectively.						
Party	Candidate	Votes	%	±%	Party votes	%	±%
SPD	Christian Schreider	50,108	32.8	▲0.9	45,895	29.9	▲5.0
CDU	✗ Torbjörn Kartes	38,193	25.0	▼7.1	33,726	22.0	▼8.9
AfD	Stefan Scheil	17,740	11.6	▼2.9	18,075	11.8	▼3.7
Greens	Armin Grau	17,061	11.2	▲5.7	18,128	11.8	▲4.5
FDP	Michael Goldschmidt	13,688	9.0	▲1.5	18,421	12.0	▲1.8
FW	Hans Arndt	7,411	4.9	▲2.2	4,789	3.1	▲1.6
Left	Liborio Ciccarello	4,648	3.0	▼2.6	4,651	3.0	▼3.6
Tierschutzpartei					2,771	1.8	
dieBasis	Alexander Kiesow	1,947	1.3		1,689	1.1	
PARTEI					1,308	0.9	▼0.3
Team Todenhöfer					1,275	0.8	
Volt					747	0.5	
Pirates					658	0.4	▼0.2
Independent	Martin Schöne	626	0.4				
Independent	Reiner Bechtel	586	0.4				
Independent	Bernd Hackel	431	0.3				
NPD					253	0.2	▼0.3
ÖDP					226	0.1	▼0.1
Humanists					160	0.1	
V-Partei3					164	0.1	▼0.2
DiB					152	0.1	
LKR	Markus Böhm	193	0.1		102	0.1	
MLPD	Lieselotte Seiberth	157	0.1	▼0.2	68	0.0	▼0.1
Informal votes		2,122			1,653		
Total valid votes		152,789			153,258		
Turnout		154,911	73.4	▼1.7			
SPD gain from CDU	Majority	11,915	7.8				

=== 2017 election ===
Federal election (2017): Ludwigshafen/Frankenthal
Notes:	Blue background denotes the winner of the electorate vote. Pink background denotes a candidate elected from their party list. Yellow background denotes an electorate win by a list member, or other incumbent. A ✓ or ✗ denotes status of any incumbent, win or lose respectively.						
Party	Candidate	Votes	%	±%	Party votes	%	±%
CDU	Torbjörn Kartes	51,168	32.1	▼11.2	49,226	30.9	▼8.1
SPD	Doris Barnett	50,740	31.9	▼3.7	39,822	25.0	▼4.6
AfD	Marcus Künster	23,109	14.5		24,641	15.5	▲9.4
FDP	Thomas Schell	11,910	7.5	▲5.0	16,321	10.2	▲5.0
Left	Gerald Unger	8,979	5.6	▲0.7	10,614	6.7	▲1.1
Greens	Dirk Dreher	8,700	5.5	▲0.7	11,621	7.3	0.0
FW	Hans Arndt	4,163	2.6	0.0	2,418	1.5	▲0.1
PARTEI					1,796	1.1	
Pirates					978	0.6	▼1.9
NPD					667	0.4	▼1.0
V-Partei³					457	0.3	
BGE					384	0.2	
ÖDP					322	0.2	0.0
MLPD	Madeleine Stockert	412	0.3	▲0.1	190	0.1	0.0
Informal votes		2,686			2,410		
Total valid votes		159,181			159,457		
Turnout		161,867	75.1	▲3.7			
CDU hold	Majority	428	0.2	▼7.5			

=== 2013 election ===
Federal election (2013): Ludwigshafen/Frankenthal
Notes:	Blue background denotes the winner of the electorate vote. Pink background denotes a candidate elected from their party list. Yellow background denotes an electorate win by a list member, or other incumbent. A ✓ or ✗ denotes status of any incumbent, win or lose respectively.						
Party	Candidate	Votes	%	±%	Party votes	%	±%
CDU	✓ Maria Böhmer	65,746	43.3	▲4.9	59,425	39.0	▲6.6
SPD	Doris Barnett	54,003	35.6	▲3.2	45,001	29.5	▲2.8
Left	Gerald Unger	7,476	4.9	▼3.7	8,538	5.6	▼4.7
Greens	Romeo Franz	7,247	4.8	▼1.4	11,042	7.2	▼1.3
AfD					9,224	6.1	
Pirates	Roman Schmitt	4,179	2.8	▲0.6	3,878	2.5	▲0.5
FW	Hans Arndt	3,939	2.6		2,162	1.4	
FDP	Thomas Schell	3,773	2.5	▼6.1	7,952	5.2	▼9.6
NPD	Heinz Neumann	2,666	1.8	▲0.6	2,177	1.4	▲0.2
REP	Marco Steigert	2,452	1.6	▼0.8	1,801	1.2	▼1.2
Party of Reason					441	0.3	
PRO					348	0.2	
ÖDP					283	0.2	0.0
MLPD	Madeleine Stockert	281	0.2	0.0	148	0.1	0.0
Informal votes		3,243			2,585		
Total valid votes		151,762			152,420		
Turnout		155,005	71.4	▲0.8			
CDU hold	Majority	11,743	7.7	▲1.8			

=== 2009 election ===
Federal election (2009): Ludwigshafen/Frankenthal
Notes:	Blue background denotes the winner of the electorate vote. Pink background denotes a candidate elected from their party list. Yellow background denotes an electorate win by a list member, or other incumbent. A ✓ or ✗ denotes status of any incumbent, win or lose respectively.						
Party	Candidate	Votes	%	±%	Party votes	%	±%
CDU	Maria Böhmer	57,736	38.4	▼1.3	48,785	32.4	▼1.4
SPD	✗ Doris Barnett	48,713	32.4	▼10.9	40,325	26.8	▼10.6
Left	Kathrin Senger-Schäfer	13,002	8.6	▲4.1	15,457	10.3	▲4.5
FDP	Ralf Marohn	12,878	8.6	▲4.1	22,392	14.9	▲4.4
Greens	Bernhard Braun	9,277	6.2	▲2.6	12,919	8.6	▲1.6
REP	Marco Steigert	3,631	2.4	▼0.4	3,601	2.4	▼0.4
Pirates	Philipp Scherer	3,188	2.1		3,079	2.0	
NPD	Ronald Neumann	1,807	1.2	▼0.3	1,798	1.2	▼0.3
FAMILIE					1,443	1.0	▼0.1
ÖDP					319	0.2	
PBC					314	0.2	▼0.1
DVU					158	0.1	
MLPD	Madeleine Stockert	210	0.1	▼0.1	121	0.1	▼0.1
Informal votes		3,013			2,744		
Total valid votes		150,442			150,711		
Turnout		153,455	70.6	▼8.0			
CDU gain from SPD	Majority	9,023	6.0				

=== 2005 election ===
Federal election (2005):Ludwigshafen/Frankenthal
Notes:	Blue background denotes the winner of the electorate vote. Pink background denotes a candidate elected from their party list. Yellow background denotes an electorate win by a list member, or other incumbent. A ✓ or ✗ denotes status of any incumbent, win or lose respectively.						
Party	Candidate	Votes	%	±%	Party votes	%	±%
SPD	✓ Doris Barnett	71,775	43.3	▼4.0	62,072	37.4	▼4.0
CDU	Maria Böhmer	65,848	39.7	▼1.2	56,038	33.7	▼3.7
Left	Wolfram Sondermann	7,509	4.5	▲3.4	9,624	5.8	▲4.7
FDP	Ralf Marohn	7,331	4.4	▼1.0	17,301	10.4	▲2.2
Greens	Walter Altvater	5,885	3.5	▼0.5	11,585	7.0	▼0.7
REP	Otto Steigert	4,639	2.8		4,578	2.8	▲1.1
NPD	Ronald Neumann	2,444	1.5	▲0.3	2,417	1.5	▲0.9
Familie					1,815	1.1	
PBC					438	0.3	0.0
MLPD	Magdalena Stockert	437	0.3		280	0.2	
Informal votes		4,002			3,722		
Total valid votes		165,868			166,148		
Turnout		169,870	78.5	▼1.4			
SPD hold	Majority	5,927	3.6				

== Notes ==
Bundestag	Vacant Party list from Rhineland-Palatinate (1982-1990) Title last held by Hamburg-Bergedorf	Constituency represented by the chancellor (as Ludwigshafen); 1990-1998	Vacant Party list from Lower Saxony (1998-2005) Title next held by Stralsund – Nordvorpommern – Rügen
