= Armin Grau =

German politician (born 1959)

Member of the Bundestag
- Incumbent
- Assumed office 26 October 2021

Personal details
- Born: 18 March 1959 (age 67) Stuttgart, West Germany (now Germany)
- Party: Alliance 90/The Greens
- Education: LMU Munich; University of Tübingen; Free University of Berlin

Armin Grau (born 18 March 1959 in Stuttgart) is a German physician and politician of the Green Party who has been serving as a member of the Bundestag since the 2021 elections.

== Life and career ==
After graduating from Wagenburg-Gymnasium Stuttgart in 1977, Armin Grau studied politics, German and history (Magister artium) from 1978 to 1983. In 1981, he decided to study medicine. After passing his state examination in 1987, he worked at the Neurological University Clinic in Heidelberg until 2003, interrupted by a stay abroad in California and a year in psychiatry. During this time, he focused his scientific work on "new" risk factors for stroke, in particular social factors as well as inflammation and acute and chronic infections such as periodontitis or the protective effect of the flu vaccination. He qualified as a lecturer in neurology in 1997. In 2003, he took over as Head of the Neurology Clinic at Ludwigshafen Hospital. From 2010 to 2014, he was the Medical Director of the clinic.

== Political career ==
Initially, Grau was politically active in student groups in Munich, Tübingen and Berlin. In 1984, he joined the Green Party (then "Alternative Liste"), having already been active there in Berlin from 1983. In 2008, he was involved in founding a local association in Altrip and was its spokesperson until 2020. From 2009 to 2019, he was a member of the Altrip local council, where he chaired the parliamentary group in 2018/19. From 2013 to 2018, he was a delegate to the Federal Working Group for Labour, Social Affairs and Health. He has been the spokesperson for the Rhein-Pfalz-Kreis district association since the beginning of 2015. Since autumn 2018, he has been the spokesperson for the BAG Arbeit, Soziales und Gesundheit and a member of the extended state executive board in Rhineland-Palatinate. He is also active in the Rhineland-Palatinate State Working Group for Social Affairs and Health. He has been the parliamentary group leader in the Rheinauen municipal council since 2019.

Grau became a member of the Bundestag in the 2021 elections, representing the Ludwigshafen/Frankenthal district. He came fourth in the Ludwigshafen/Frankenthal constituency with 11.2% of the first votes and thus missed out on the direct mandate.

In addition to his committee assignments, Grau has been one of the founding members of a cross-party group promoting a One Health approach since 2022.

== Political positions ==
Due to his work as a doctor, Grau's political focus is on health, care and social policy. In parliament, he has since been serving on the Health Committee and the Committee on the Environment, Nature Conservation, Nuclear Safety and Consumer Protection. In local politics, important issues for him are debt relief for Rhineland-Palatinate cities such as Ludwigshafen, transport policy with the expansion of cycling and public transport and flood and water protection on the Rhine.

== Private life ==
Grau and his family have lived in Altrip since the end of 2003. He is married and has five children.

== Other activities ==
- German Federation for the Environment and Nature Conservation (BUND), Member
- German Stroke Society, member of the board (2016-2021) and first chairman (2018-2019)
