= Ruffec, Charente =

Ruffec
- Commune
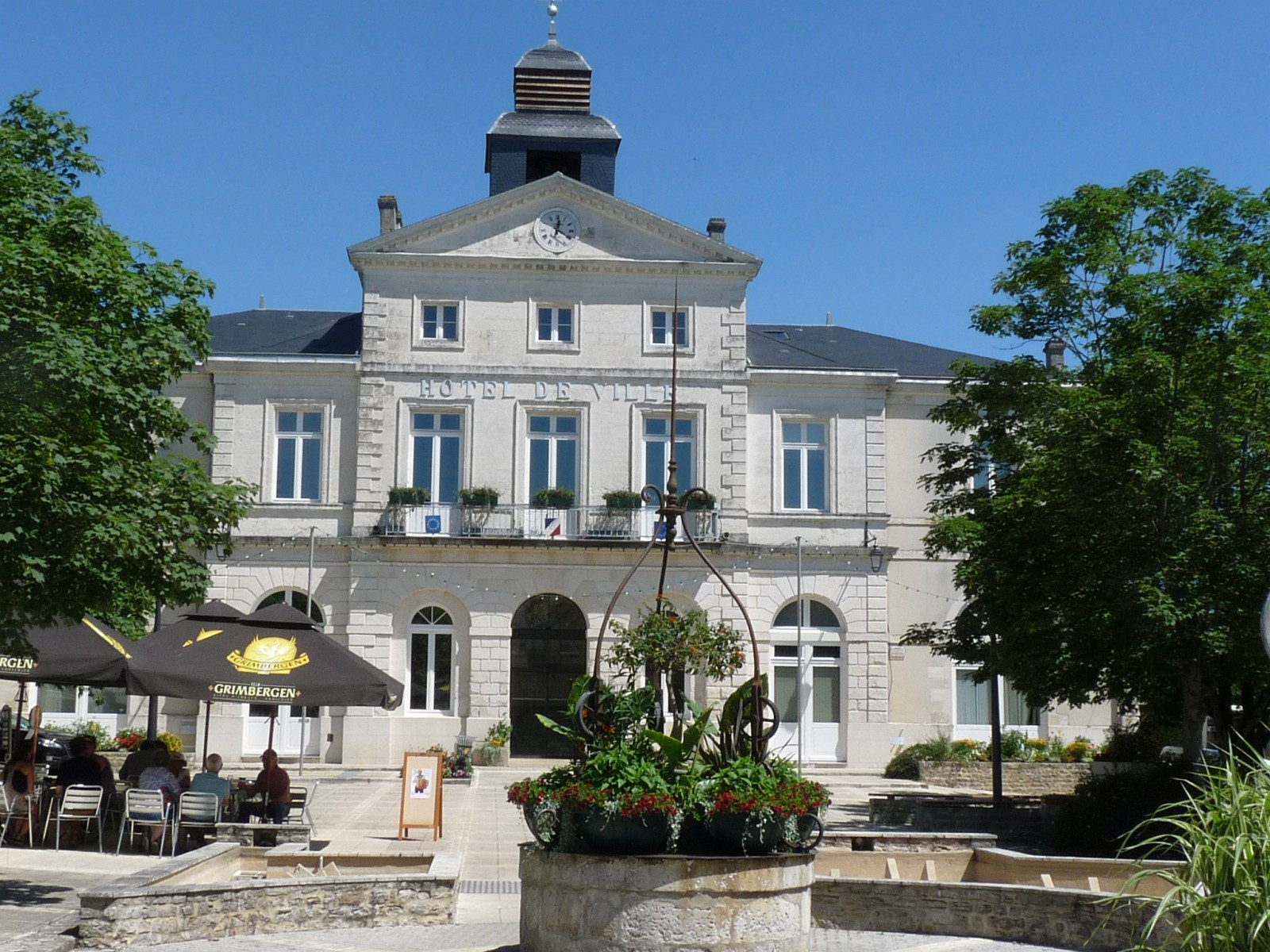
- Town hall

- Coat of arms
- Location of Ruffec
- Location within France Location within Nouvelle-Aquitaine
- Coordinates: 46°01′46″N 0°12′00″E
- Country: France
- Region: Nouvelle-Aquitaine
- Department: Charente
- Arrondissement: Confolens
- Canton: Charente-Nord

Government
  - Mayor (2020–2026): Thierry Bastier
- Area^{1}: 13.37 km^{2} (5.16 sq mi)
- Highest elevation: 145 m (476 ft)
- Lowest elevation: 83 m (272 ft)
- Population (2023): 3,449
  - Density: 258.0/km^{2} (668.1/sq mi)
- Time zone: UTC+01:00 (CET)
  - Summer (DST): UTC+02:00 (CEST)
- INSEE/Postal code: 16292 /16700
- ^{1} French Land Register data, which excludes lakes, ponds, glaciers > 1 km^{2} (0.386 sq mi or 247 acres) and river estuaries.

Ruffec (French pronunciation: [ʁyfɛk]) is a commune in the Charente department in southwestern France.

It is a stopover town on the road from Paris to Spain (Route nationale 10), between Poitiers and Angoulême.

During the Second World War, Ruffec was at the centre of Resistance for the evacuation of the Allied airmen towards Spain.

== Population ==
Its inhabitants are known as the Ruffécois or the Ruffécoises in French.

Historical population

Year	Pop.	±% p.a.
1793	1,937	—
1800	2,110	+1.23%
1806	2,197	+0.68%
1821	2,526	+0.93%
1831	3,004	+1.75%
1841	2,977	−0.09%
1846	3,074	+0.64%
1851	3,654	+3.52%
1856	3,109	−3.18%
1861	3,235	+0.80%
1866	3,175	−0.37%
1872	3,233	+0.30%
1876	3,385	+1.16%
1881	3,642	+1.47%
1886	3,589	−0.29%
1891	3,527	−0.35%
1896	3,426	−0.58%
1901	3,474	+0.28%

Year	Pop.	±% p.a.
1906	3,375	−0.58%
1911	3,483	+0.63%
1921	3,231	−0.75%
1926	3,194	−0.23%
1931	3,292	+0.61%
1936	3,467	+1.04%
1946	3,874	+1.12%
1954	3,724	−0.49%
1962	4,009	+0.93%
1968	4,157	+0.61%
1975	4,241	+0.29%
1982	4,193	−0.16%
1990	3,893	−0.92%
1999	3,630	−0.77%
2007	3,594	−0.12%
2012	3,494	−0.56%
2017	3,410	−0.49%
2023	3,449	+0.19%

Source: EHESS and INSEE (1968-2023)

== Twin towns – sister cities ==
Ruffec is twinned with:

- Waldsee, Germany
- Pásztó, Hungary

== Climate ==
Climate data for Ruffec (1981–2010 normals, extremes 1959–2018)
Month	Jan	Feb	Mar	Apr	May	Jun	Jul	Aug	Sep	Oct	Nov	Dec	Year
Record high °C (°F)	17.4 (63.3)	23.5 (74.3)	26.6 (79.9)	29.6 (85.3)	33.3 (91.9)	38.4 (101.1)	38.6 (101.5)	40.2 (104.4)	36.4 (97.5)	30.3 (86.5)	24.0 (75.2)	19.0 (66.2)	40.2 (104.4)
Mean daily maximum °C (°F)	8.3 (46.9)	9.9 (49.8)	13.6 (56.5)	16.3 (61.3)	20.3 (68.5)	24.0 (75.2)	26.8 (80.2)	26.7 (80.1)	23.1 (73.6)	18.2 (64.8)	12.0 (53.6)	8.7 (47.7)	17.4 (63.3)
Daily mean °C (°F)	5.0 (41.0)	5.7 (42.3)	8.5 (47.3)	10.7 (51.3)	14.6 (58.3)	17.9 (64.2)	20.1 (68.2)	19.9 (67.8)	16.8 (62.2)	13.2 (55.8)	8.1 (46.6)	5.5 (41.9)	12.2 (54.0)
Mean daily minimum °C (°F)	1.7 (35.1)	1.5 (34.7)	3.4 (38.1)	5.1 (41.2)	8.8 (47.8)	11.7 (53.1)	13.4 (56.1)	13.1 (55.6)	10.6 (51.1)	8.3 (46.9)	4.2 (39.6)	2.3 (36.1)	7.0 (44.6)
Record low °C (°F)	−19.0 (−2.2)	−14.9 (5.2)	−11.6 (11.1)	−4.4 (24.1)	−1.4 (29.5)	2.0 (35.6)	4.2 (39.6)	3.2 (37.8)	1.2 (34.2)	−3.3 (26.1)	−9.0 (15.8)	−11.4 (11.5)	−19.0 (−2.2)
Average precipitation mm (inches)	81.8 (3.22)	64.0 (2.52)	59.2 (2.33)	67.7 (2.67)	74.8 (2.94)	53.2 (2.09)	45.7 (1.80)	49.7 (1.96)	60.9 (2.40)	89.5 (3.52)	90.3 (3.56)	95.6 (3.76)	832.4 (32.77)
Average precipitation days (≥ 1.0 mm)	11.8	10.0	9.9	11.0	11.7	7.7	7.5	7.0	7.7	11.2	12.3	12.2	120.1
Source: Meteociel

== See also ==
- Communes of the Charente department
