= Karl Striebinger =

German footballer and manager

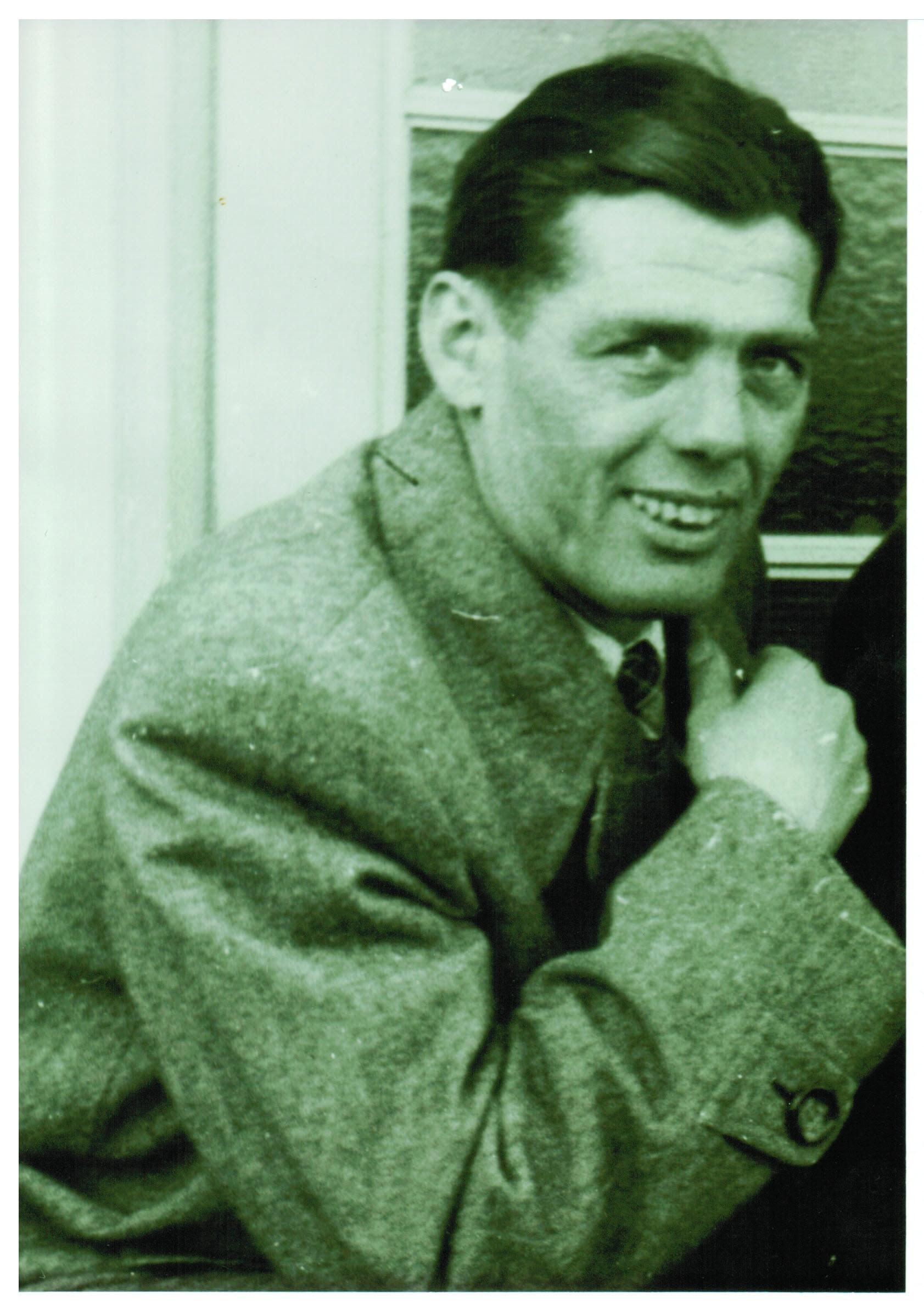

Personal information
- Full name: Karl Striebinger
- Date of birth: 2 August 1913
- Place of birth: Neuhofen, German Empire
- Date of death: 12 June 1981 (aged 67)
- Place of death: West Germany
- Position: Forward

Senior career*
Years	Team	Apps	(Gls)
1930–1934	TSV Neuhofen		
1934–1949	VfR Mannheim		

International career
1937–1938	Germany	3	(2)

Managerial career
- 1950–1951: Karlsruher FV
- 1951–1952: BC Augsburg
- 1952–1954: Wormatia Worms
- 1956–1957: FV Speyer
- 1957–1958: FC 08 Homburg
- 1959: BC Augsburg
- 1962–1963: Waldhof Mannheim
- 1963: 1. FC Pforzheim
- 1964–1965: BSC Oppau
- * Club domestic league appearances and goals

Karl Striebinger (2 August 1913 – 12 June 1981) was a German footballer and manager who played as a forward and made three appearances for the Germany national team.

== Career ==
Striebinger made his international debut for Germany on 21 March 1937 in a friendly against Luxembourg. He scored the second and third goals for Germany in the match, which took place in Luxembourg City and finished as a 3–2 win. He earned his third and final cap on 6 February 1938 in a friendly against Switzerland, which finished as a 1–1 draw in Cologne.

== Personal life ==
Striebinger died on 12 June 1981 at the age of 67.

== Career statistics ==
=== International ===
Germany
Year	Apps	Goals
1937	2	2
1938	1	0
Total	3	2

=== International goals ===
No.	Date	Venue	Opponent	Score	Result	Competition
1	21 March 1937	Stade Municipal, Luxembourg City, Luxembourg	Luxembourg	2–0	3–2	Friendly
2	21 March 1937	Stade Municipal, Luxembourg City, Luxembourg	Luxembourg	3–0	3–2	Friendly
