= Doris Barnett =

German politician (born 1953)

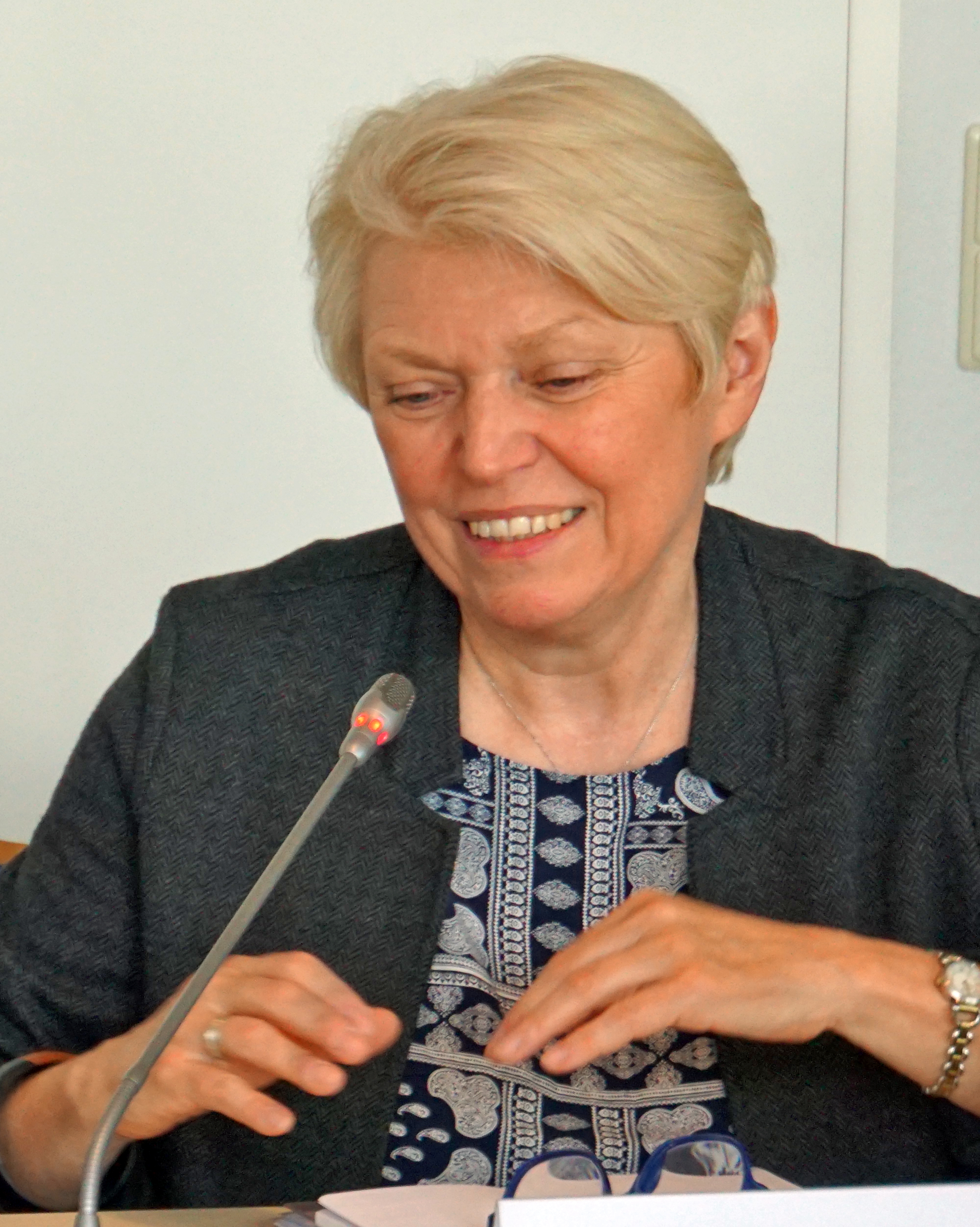
- Barnett at the 2019 OSCEPA conference in Denmark

Member of the Bundestag
- In office 1994–2021

Personal details
- Born: 22 May 1953 (age 73) Ludwigshafen am Rhein, West Germany (now Germany)
- Citizenship: German
- Party: SPD
- Children: 1
- Education: University of Mainz
- Occupation: Politician

Doris Barnett (born 22 May 1953) is a German politician of the Social Democratic Party (SPD) who served as a member of the German Bundestag from 1994 to 2021, representing Ludwigshafen/Frankenthal.

== Political career ==
Barnett first became a member of the German Bundestag in the 1994 federal elections, representing the Ludwigshafen/Frankenthal electoral district. In the 1994 and 1998 elections, her opponent of the CDU was incumbent Chancellor Helmut Kohl. For her election campaign in 1998, she recruited Marc S. Ellenbogen as her advisor.

Barnett was part of the SPD parliamentary group’s leadership from 1998. Within the group, she served as a member of the working group on the world economy between 2003 and 2013.

Barnett was a member of the Committee on Labour and Social Affairs between 1994 and 2005. From 2002 to 2005, she also served on the parliament’s Council of Elders, which – among other duties – determines daily legislative agenda items and assigns committee chairpersons based on party representation.

A long-time member of the Budget Committee and its Sub-Committee on European Affairs, Barnett served as her parliamentary group's rapporteur on the budget of the Federal Foreign Office, including Germany’s humanitarian aid. In this capacity, she also belonged to the SPD working group on the national budget. From 2018, she chaired the Sub-Committee on European Affairs. In 2019, she also joined the Committee on Economic Affairs and Development.

In addition to her committee assignments, Barnett served as deputy chairwoman of the German-Russian Parliamentary Friendship Group from 2018 to 2021.

Barnett was part of the German delegation to the Parliamentary Assembly of the Council of Europe from 2006 to 2021, where she served on the Committee on Political Affairs and Democracy. In addition, she was the chairwoman of the German delegation to the Parliamentary Assembly of the Organization for Security and Co-operation in Europe (OSCE) from 2009. In that capacity, she chaired the Assembly’s observer mission during the 2019 Ukrainian presidential election.

== Other activities ==
=== Corporate boards ===
- RSBK Strategie Beratung Kommunikation AG, Member of the Advisory Board
- Saint-Gobain ISOVER G+H AG, Member of the Supervisory Board

=== Non-profits ===
- Mannheim University of Applied Management Studies (HdWM), Member of the Board of Trustees
- German Friends of the Weizmann Institute of Science, Member
- Global Panel Foundation, Member of the Board of Directors
- Institute for European Politics (IEP), Member of the Board of Trustees
- Deutsche Arbeitsgerichtsverband (DArbGV), Member
- German United Services Trade Union (ver.di), Member
- IG Bergbau, Chemie, Energie (IG BCE), Member

== Recognition ==
- 2016 – Order of Merit of the Federal Republic of Germany
