= Torbjörn Kartes =

German politician

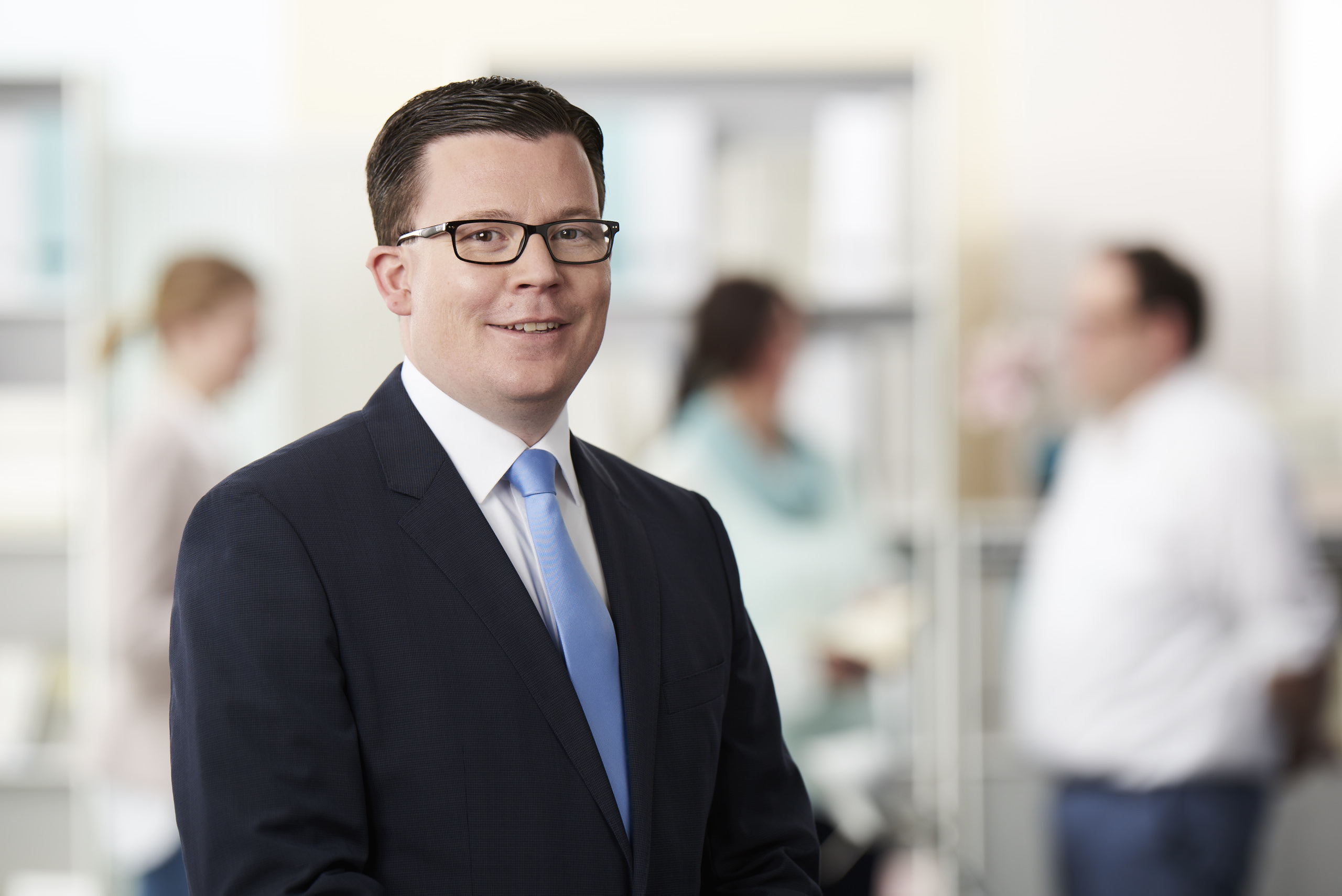
- Torbjörn Kartes in 2017

Member of the Bundestag for Ludwigshafen/Frankenthal
- Incumbent
- Assumed office 24 October 2017

Personal details
- Born: 23 April 1979 (age 46) Freiburg im Breisgau, West Germany
- Party: CDU
- Children: 1

Torbjörn Kartes (born 23 April 1979) is a German politician. Born in Freiburg im Breisgau, Baden-Württemberg, he represents the CDU. Torbjörn Kartes served as a member of the Bundestag from the state of Rhineland-Palatinate from 2017 to 2021.

== Life ==
He became member of the bundestag after the 2017 German federal election. He is a member of the Committee for Labour and Social Affairs and the Committee for Family, Senior Citizens, Women and Youth.
