= Waldsee, Palatinate =

Waldsee
- Municipality
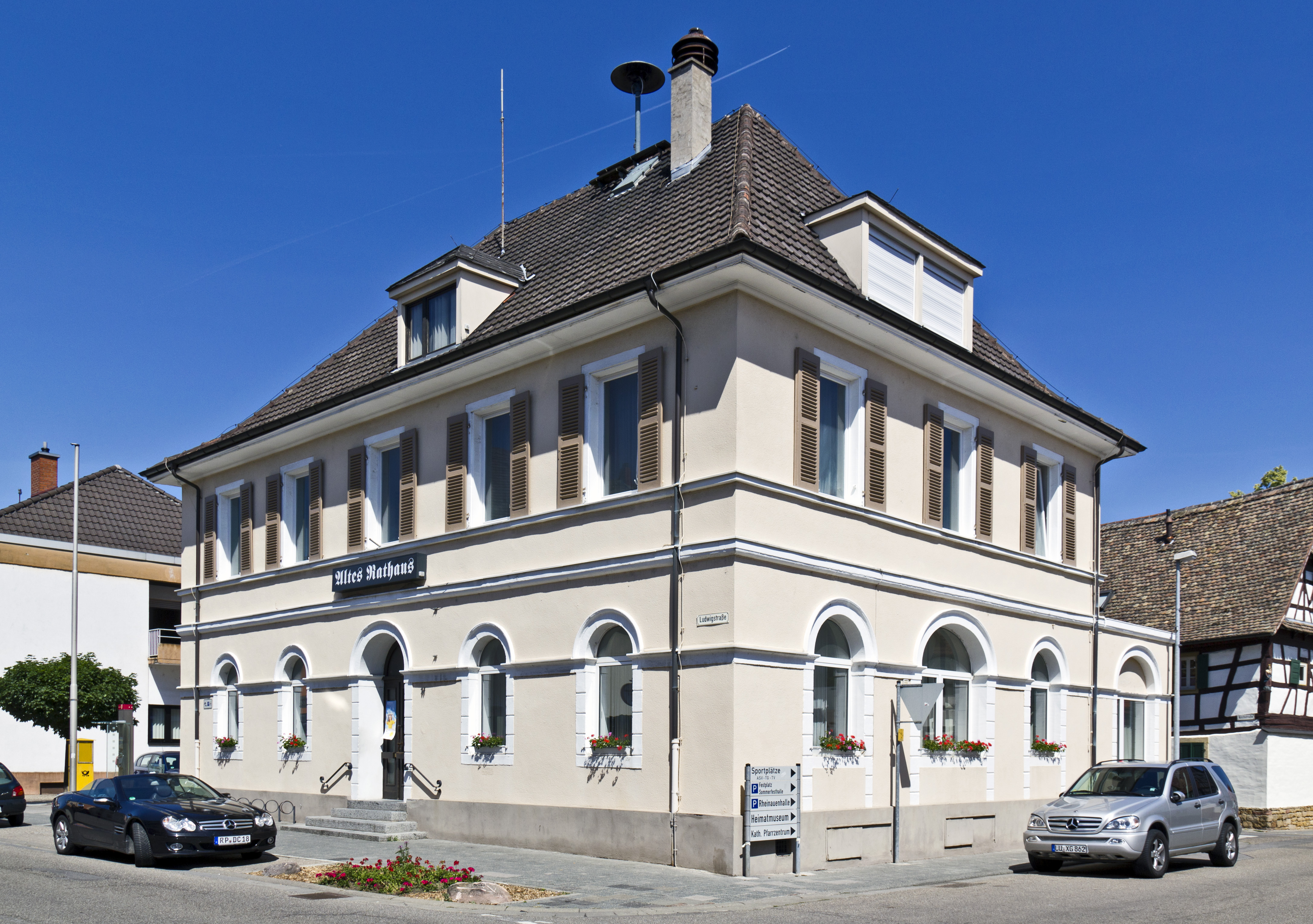
- Old Town Hall

- Coat of arms

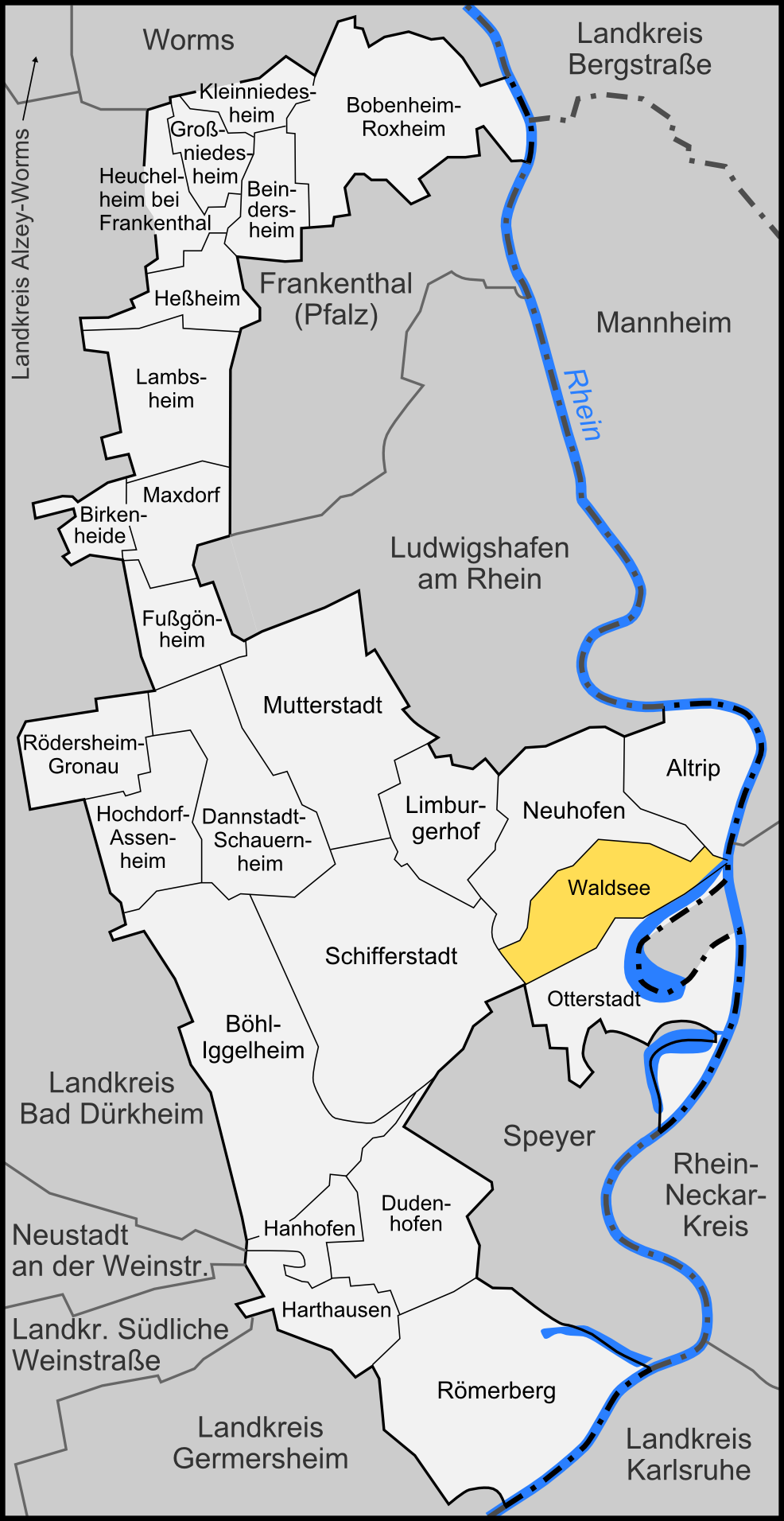
- Location of Waldsee within Rhein-Pfalz-Kreis district
- Interactive map of Waldsee
- Location within Germany Location within Rhineland-Palatinate
- Coordinates: 49°24′N 8°26′E
- Country: Germany
- State: Rhineland-Palatinate
- District: Rhein-Pfalz-Kreis
- Municipal assoc.: Rheinauen

Government
  - Mayor (2019–24): Claudia Klein (CDU)

Area
  - Total: 12.94 km^{2} (5.00 sq mi)
- Elevation: 99 m (325 ft)

Population (2025-12-31)
  - Total: 5,998
  - Density: 463.5/km^{2} (1,201/sq mi)
- Time zone: UTC+01:00 (CET)
  - Summer (DST): UTC+02:00 (CEST)
- Postal codes: 67165
- Dialling codes: 06236
- Vehicle registration: RP
- Website: www.waldsee.de

Waldsee (German pronunciation: [ˈvaltˌzeː]) is a municipality in the Rhein-Pfalz-Kreis, in Rhineland-Palatinate, Germany.

It is situated approximately 3 km north of Speyer. Waldsee is the seat of the Verbandsgemeinde ("collective municipality") Rheinauen.

== Twin towns – sister cities ==
Waldsee is twinned with:

- Ruffec, Charente, France (1974)
