= Otterstadt =

- Municipality
- Coat of arms

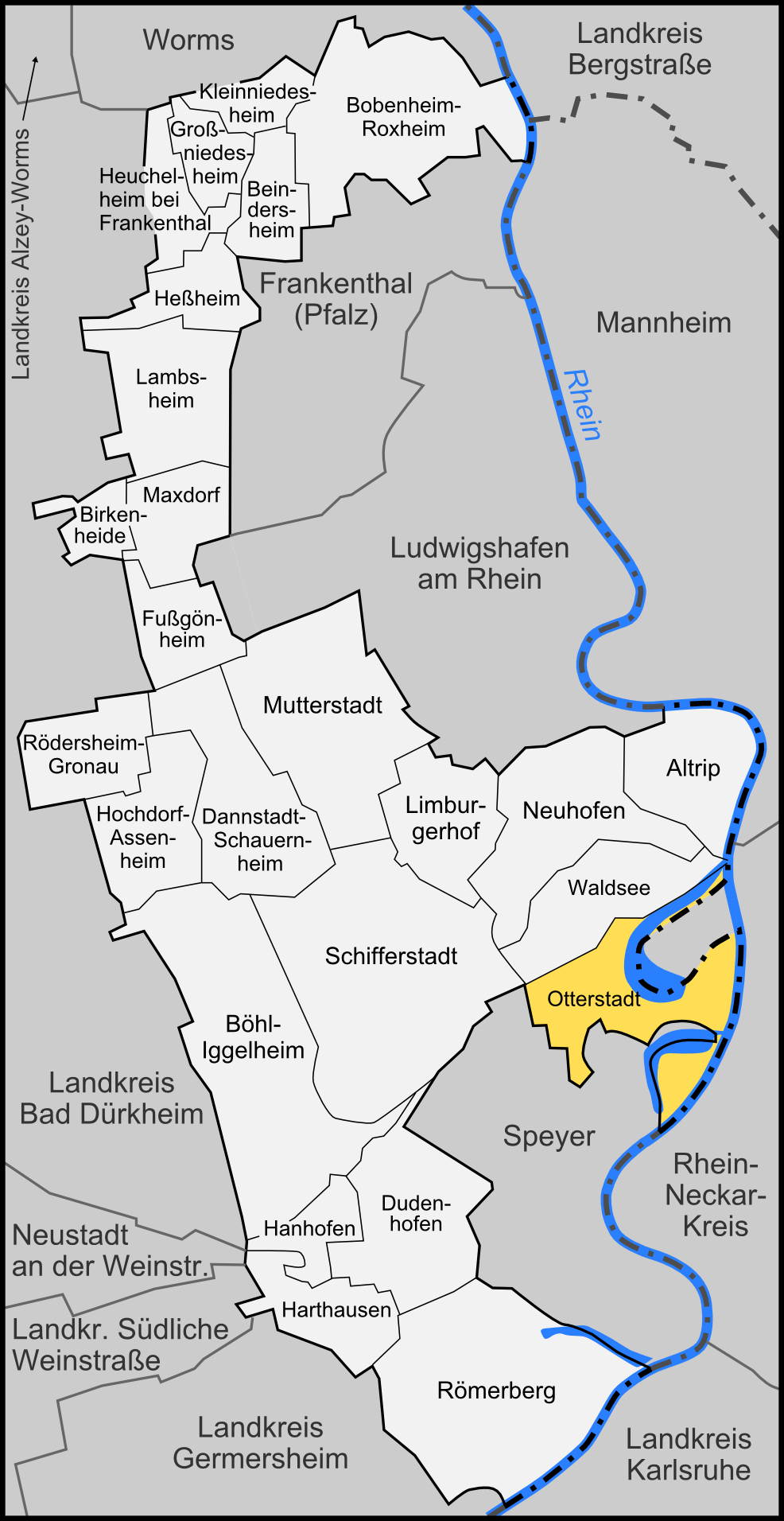
- Location of Otterstadt within Rhein-Pfalz-Kreis district
- Interactive map of Otterstadt
- Location within Germany Location within Rhineland-Palatinate
- Coordinates: 49°22′N 8°27′E
- Country: Germany
- State: Rhineland-Palatinate
- District: Rhein-Pfalz-Kreis
- Municipal assoc.: Rheinauen

Government
  - Mayor (2019–24): Bernd Zimmermann (CDU)

Area
  - Total: 15.66 km^{2} (6.05 sq mi)
- Elevation: 100 m (330 ft)

Population (2025-12-31)
  - Total: 3,263
  - Density: 208.4/km^{2} (539.7/sq mi)
- Time zone: UTC+01:00 (CET)
  - Summer (DST): UTC+02:00 (CEST)
- Postal codes: 67166
- Dialling codes: 06232
- Vehicle registration: RP
- Website: www.otterstadt.de

Otterstadt (German pronunciation: [ˈɔtɐʃtat]) is a municipality in the Rhein-Pfalz-Kreis, in Rhineland-Palatinate, Germany.

The almost 980-year-old village was once a pure agricultural and fishing village. Today the inhabitants work in the neighbouring industrial cities: Mannheim, Ludwigshafen and Speyer.
