= Rheinauen (Verbandsgemeinde) =

Municipality in Rhineland-Palatinate, Germany

- Verbandsgemeinde
- Interactive map of Rheinauen
- Location within Germany Location within Rhineland-Palatinate
- Coordinates: 49°23′N 8°26′E
- Country: Germany
- State: Rhineland-Palatinate
- District: Rhein-Pfalz-Kreis
- Seat: Waldsee
- Subdivisions: 4 municipalities

Area
  - Total: 51.37 km^{2} (19.83 sq mi)

Population (2025-12-31)
  - Total: 23,842
  - Density: 464.1/km^{2} (1,202/sq mi)
- Time zone: UTC+01:00 (CET)
  - Summer (DST): UTC+02:00 (CEST)
- Website: www.vg-rheinauen.de

Rheinauen is a Verbandsgemeinde ("collective municipality") in the district Rhein-Pfalz-Kreis, in Rhineland-Palatinate, Germany. The seat of the Verbandsgemeinde is in Waldsee. Before 1 January 2016, the Verbandsgemeinde was named Waldsee.

The Verbandsgemeinde Rheinauen consists of the following Ortsgemeinden ("local municipalities"):

1. Altrip
2. Neuhofen
3. Otterstadt
4. Waldsee
