= Mannheim Harbour =

River port

Coordinates: 49°31′01″N 8°28′03″E

Rhein-Neckar-Hafen Mannheim
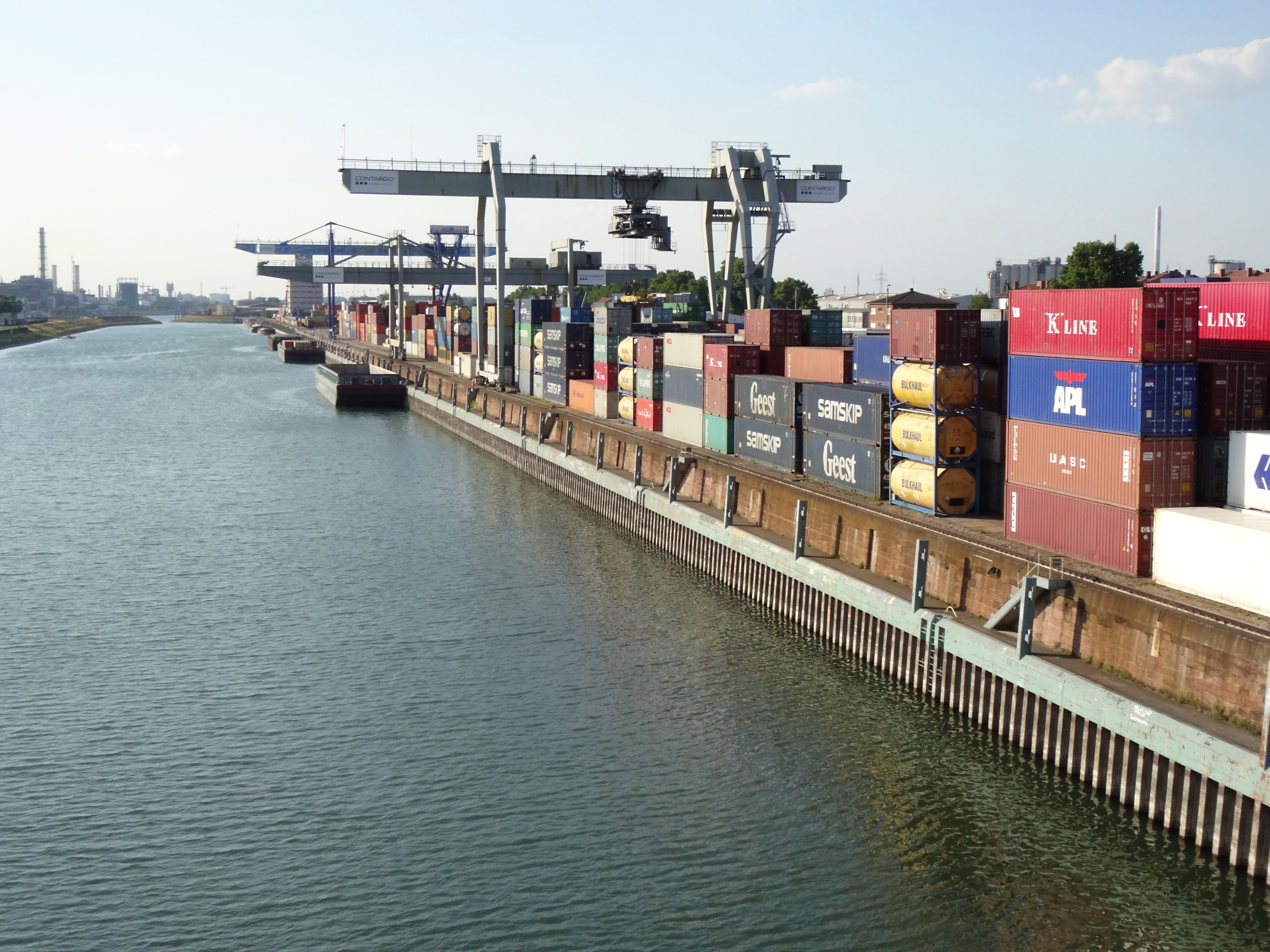
- Click on the map for a fullscreen view

Location
- Country: Germany
- Location: Mannheim, Baden-Württemberg, Germany

Details
- Opened: 1828
- Operated by: Rhein-Neckar-Hafengesellschaft Mannheim mbH
- Owned by: State of Baden-Württemberg
- Type of harbour: River port
- Size of harbour: 3.420 km²
- Land area: 8.635 km²
- Size: 11.310 km²
- No. of berths: 4
- No. of piers: 14

Statistics
- Annual container volume: 8.1 million tonnes (2015)
- Website, port of Mannheim GmbH

Mannheim Harbour, named Rhein-Neckar-Hafen Mannheim, is a river port on the Rhine in Mannheim, at the confluence of the Rhine and the Neckar in Baden-Wurttemberg. It consists out of 4 main harbour areas Handelshafen, Rheinauhafen, Altrheinhafen and Industriehafen, which are divided into 14 single harbour basins and 3 river docks.

It is one of the most important inland ports in Europe. The port covers 3.42 km² of water (2.83 km² Rhine, 0.59 km² Neckar) and 8.635 km² of dockland. The total land area covered from the harbour is about 11.31 km², making it the biggest inland port in Germany based on this measure.

The Rhein-Neckar-Hafen Mannheim reflects a trimodal transport node at the junction of road and rail inks and two national waterways and offers various transhipment facilities. The 4 main harbour areas have overnight rail connections to all German and many important European commercial centres and it can be accessed by road via several main motorways.

== History ==
| Year | Historic data |
|---|---|
| 1247 | First mention in records of river tolls at the confluence of the Neckar. |
| 1349 | Rhine toll station above the fishing village of Mannheim. |
| 1607 | Foundation of Mannheim, development into a trading and depot centre. |
| 1828 | Opening of the free port of Mannheim. |
| 1854 | Connection of the port to the railway system. |
| 1870-1875 | Construction of the Mühlau Port. |
| 1892-1895 | Construction of the Rhine Quay. |
| 1896-1901 | Construction of the Rheinau Port from a private company. Taken over by the state in 1903. |
| 1962-1964 | Construction of the Oil Terminal (Friesenheim Basin) |
| 1968 | 1st container terminal in the Trade Port. |
| 1991 | 1st combined load transport terminal in the Trade Port. |
| 2008 | 1st photovoltaic systems installed on a total of 7,000 m² of roof area. |

== Freight exchange ==
| Year | Tonnes of freight |
|---|---|
| 2003 | 6.9 million |
| 2005 | 8.1 million |
| 2007 | 8.3 million |
| 2009 | 7.8 million |
| 2011 | 6.5 million |
| 2013 | 8,7 million |
| 2015 | 8.1 million |

== Infrastructure ==
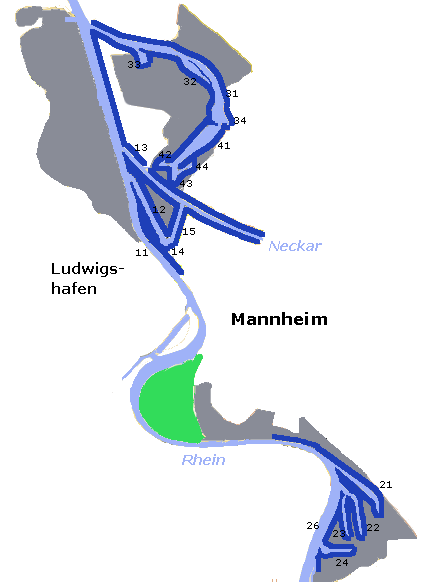
Map of the harbour

The port includes 226 hectares of outside storage and handling area and 119 hectares of roofed storage area. It also provides 1,527 storage silos and bunkers for grain, coal, gravel, cement, fruit, feed and other bulk goods with a total capacity of over 385,000 tonnes and for liquid based products like mineral and edible oils, 1,078 tanks with a total capacity of almost 1.5 million tonnes are available.

Furthermore, the port provides:

- 78 loading and crane gantries (24 on the quayside)
- 37 portal cranes (25 on the quayside)
- 14 heavy duty cranes up to 150 tonnes (10 on the quayside)
- 4 special transhipment systems for containers
- 52 mobile cranes
- 210 other lifting systems
- 24 marine loaders

== Today ==
About 500 enterprises with more than 20,000 jobs are established on the dockland and service providers in the wider area around the port. The port management company has announced in December 2017 that the port will generate new records mostly in all segments which are operated.
