= Christian Schreider =

German politician

Christian Schreider (born 22 December 1971) is a German politician of the Social Democratic Party (SPD) who has been serving as a member of the Bundestag since 2021.

== Early life and education ==
Schreider was born 1971 in the West German city of Worms and studied law.

== Political career ==
Schreider entered the SPD in 1998 and became member of the Bundestag in 2021. In parliament, he has since been serving on the Committee on Transport and the Sports Committee.

== Other activities ==
- Federal Network Agency for Electricity, Gas, Telecommunications, Posts and Railway (BNetzA), Member of the Rail Infrastructure Advisory Council (since 2022)
- German United Services Trade Union (ver.di), Member
