= Neuhofen =

- Municipality
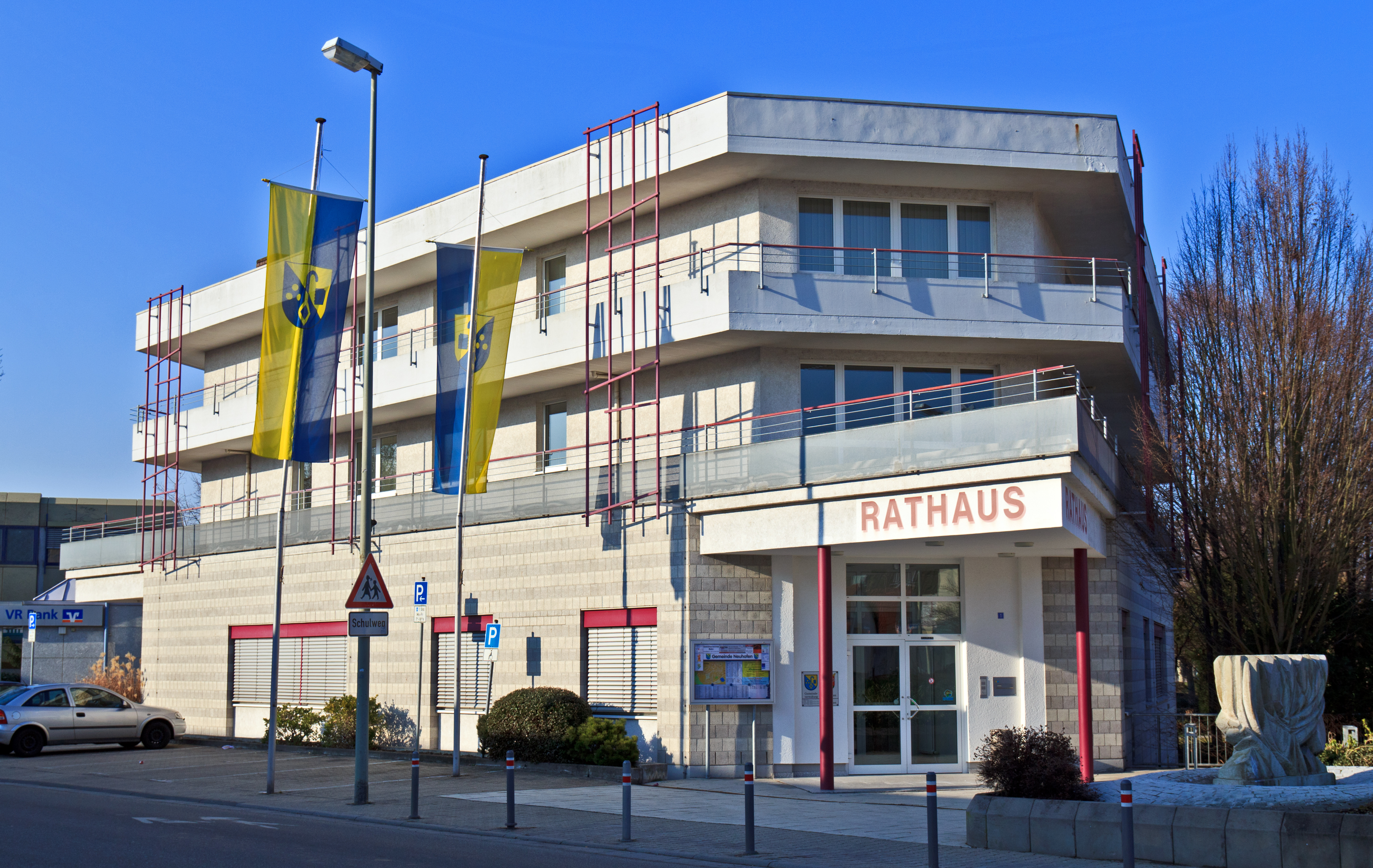
- Town hall

- Coat of arms

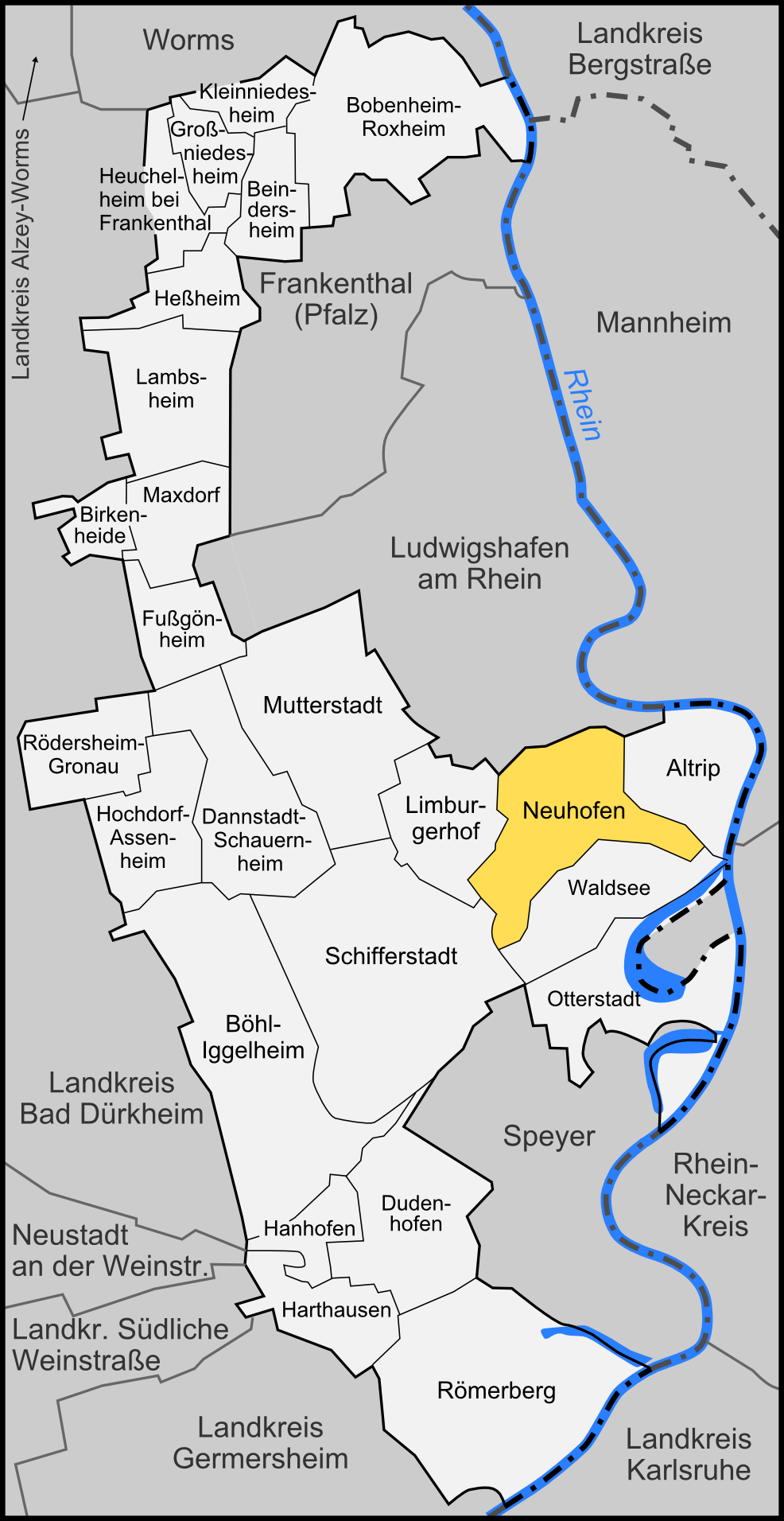
- Location of Neuhofen within Rhein-Pfalz-Kreis district
- Interactive map of Neuhofen
- Location within Germany Location within Rhineland-Palatinate
- Coordinates: 49°25′N 8°25′E
- Country: Germany
- State: Rhineland-Palatinate
- District: Rhein-Pfalz-Kreis
- Municipal assoc.: Rheinauen

Government
  - Mayor (2019–24): Ralf Marohn (FDP)

Area
  - Total: 12.3 km^{2} (4.7 sq mi)
- Elevation: 98 m (322 ft)

Population (2025-12-31)
  - Total: 6,971
  - Density: 567/km^{2} (1,470/sq mi)
- Time zone: UTC+01:00 (CET)
  - Summer (DST): UTC+02:00 (CEST)
- Postal codes: 67141
- Dialling codes: 06236
- Vehicle registration: RP
- Website: www.neuhofen.de

Neuhofen (German pronunciation: [nɔʏˈhoːfn̩]) is a municipality in the Rhein-Pfalz-Kreis, in Rhineland-Palatinate, Germany. It is situated approximately 7 km south of Ludwigshafen.

== History ==
Starting point of Neuhofen was the declined village Medenheim, east of Neuhofen. Being property of the monastery Wissembourg since the 10th century, 1194 Medenheim was sold to the Cistercian monastery Himmerod. The Cistercians founded the farm Nova Curia („New Farm“ or „Neuer Hof“ in German) near Medenheim. More and more people from Medenheim moved to the new farm, and Medenheim declined.

== Historical Buildings and Sights ==
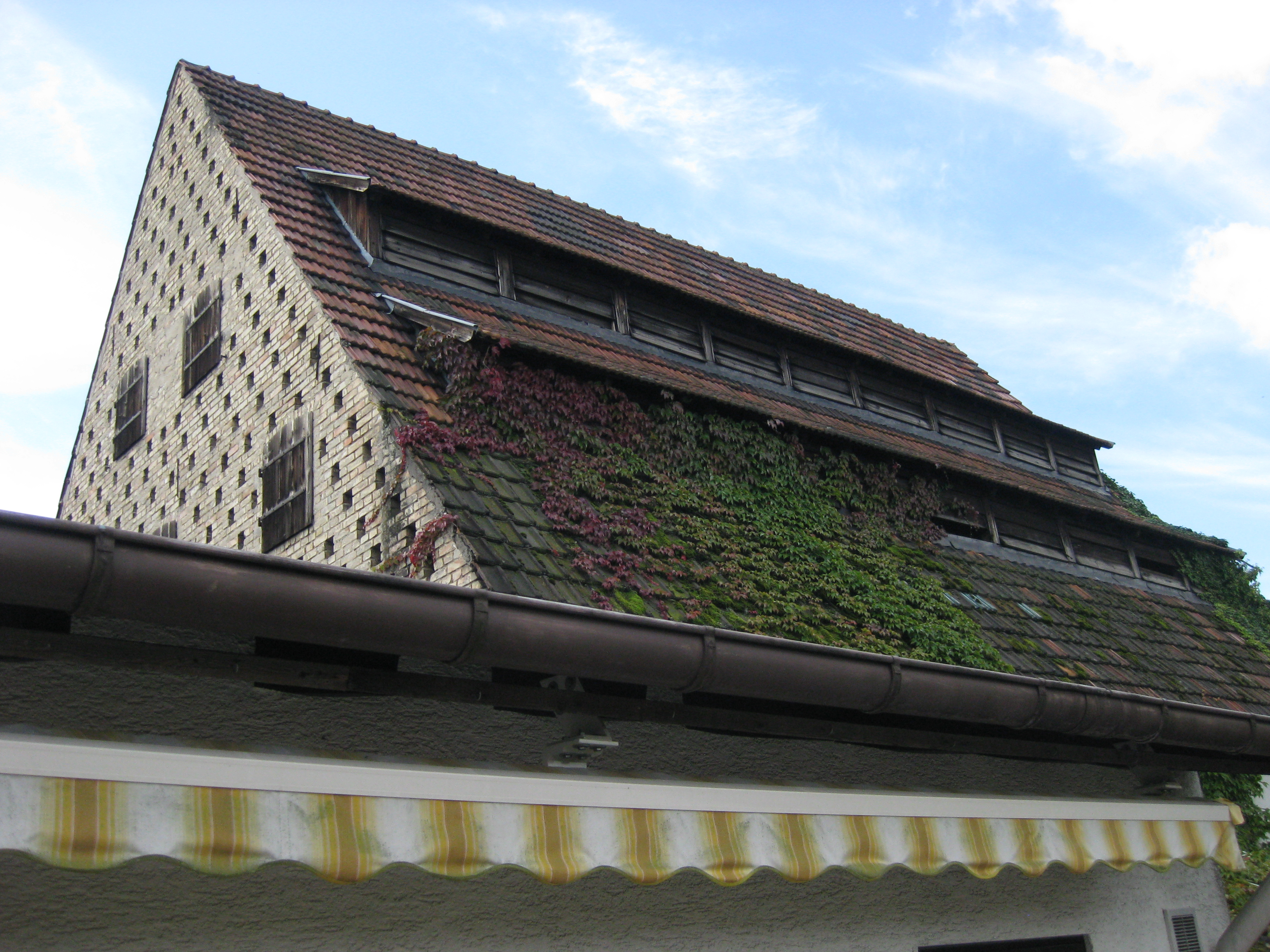
Neuhofen Tabac Haus

=== Timeline ===
- 9 May 1194 The area of Neuhofen became property of the Cistercians of Himmerod. The document stating this was testified by Henry VI, Emperor of the Holy Roman Empire of the German Nation. ("Kaiser Heinrich VI. bekundet, dass durch seine Hände, Abt Gottfried von Weißenburg mit seinen Mitbrüdern und Ministerialie das Hofgut in Medenheim und Rechholz, das Eberhard von Ried vom Kloster Weißenburg zu Lehen trug, an Abt Herman von Himmerod und sein Kloster zu Eigentum übertragen hat.")
- 1194 The Cistercians did not settle in the village of Medenheim, but at a mill on the "Rehbach" stream.
- 1209 Neuhofen's name (in Latin Nova Curia) was first mentioned in a document of the Bishop of Speyer about a conflict between the cloister of Himmerod and the farmers of Mutterstadt.
- 1220 The old church of Medenheim was torn down
- 1318 Bishop Emich of Speyer permits the construction of a new church in Neuhofen. The patron saint of the new church is Michael.
- 1318 The cloister of Himmerod sells Neuhofen, but keeps the right to levy tax.
- 1349 Destruction of the castle of Neuhofen
- 1449 Destruction of Neuhofen in the war about the succession of Louis IV, Count Palatine of the Rhine
- 1543 In the Protestant Reformation Neuhofen changes denomination.
- 1584 The river Rhine changes its course, this is the origin of the Neuhöfer Altrhein (a lake marking the earlier course of the river)
- 1618 - 1648 In the Thirty Years' War Neuhofen is looted and destroyed many times. Its inhabitants move to the surrounding towns. Only few families return after the war, Huguenots settle in Neuhofen.
- 1637 Plague
- between 1688 and 1697 destruction in the Palatine Succession War
- 1797 - 1815 Neuhofen and the Palatine west of the Rhine are part of the French Republic (Départements Mont-Tonnerre)
- 19th century the railway to Saarbrücken was built by Paul Camille von Denis; between Mutterstadt and Neuhofen a railway station was built
- 1852 the sugar refinery on the Friedensau was put into operation; Neuhofen begins to turn into a residence for workers
- 1865 the BASF was founded in Mannheim and moved to Ludwigshafen. In Ludwigshafen more chemical companies were founded, more and more workers settled in Neuhofen.

=== Population ===
- 1585: 200 persons (according to a tax list, 53 families)
- 1655: 28 persons (after the Thirty Years' War)
- 1700: 90 persons
- 1802: 502 persons (333 Reformed, 87 Lutheran, 93 Catholic)
- 1835: 1015 persons (826 Evangelical, 186 Catholic, 4 Jewish)
- 1867: 1453 persons (1166 Evangelical, 202 Catholic, 18 Jewish)
- 1905: 2464 persons (2022 Evangelical, 396 Catholic, 33 Jewish, 13 of other religion according to a census)
- In World War I 87 soldiers from Neuhofen are killed in action.
- 1930: 3060 persons
- In World War II soldiers from Neuhofen are killed in action; 67 are missing till today; 13 people from Neuhofen get killed because of their "race" or political beliefs.
- 1950: 3641 persons (according to a census)
- 1970: 5291 persons (according to a census)
- 1995: 7262 persons
- 2006: 7297 persons

=== Notable people ===
- Manfred Kaltz, football player
- Karl Striebinger, football player
