= Altrip =

- Municipality
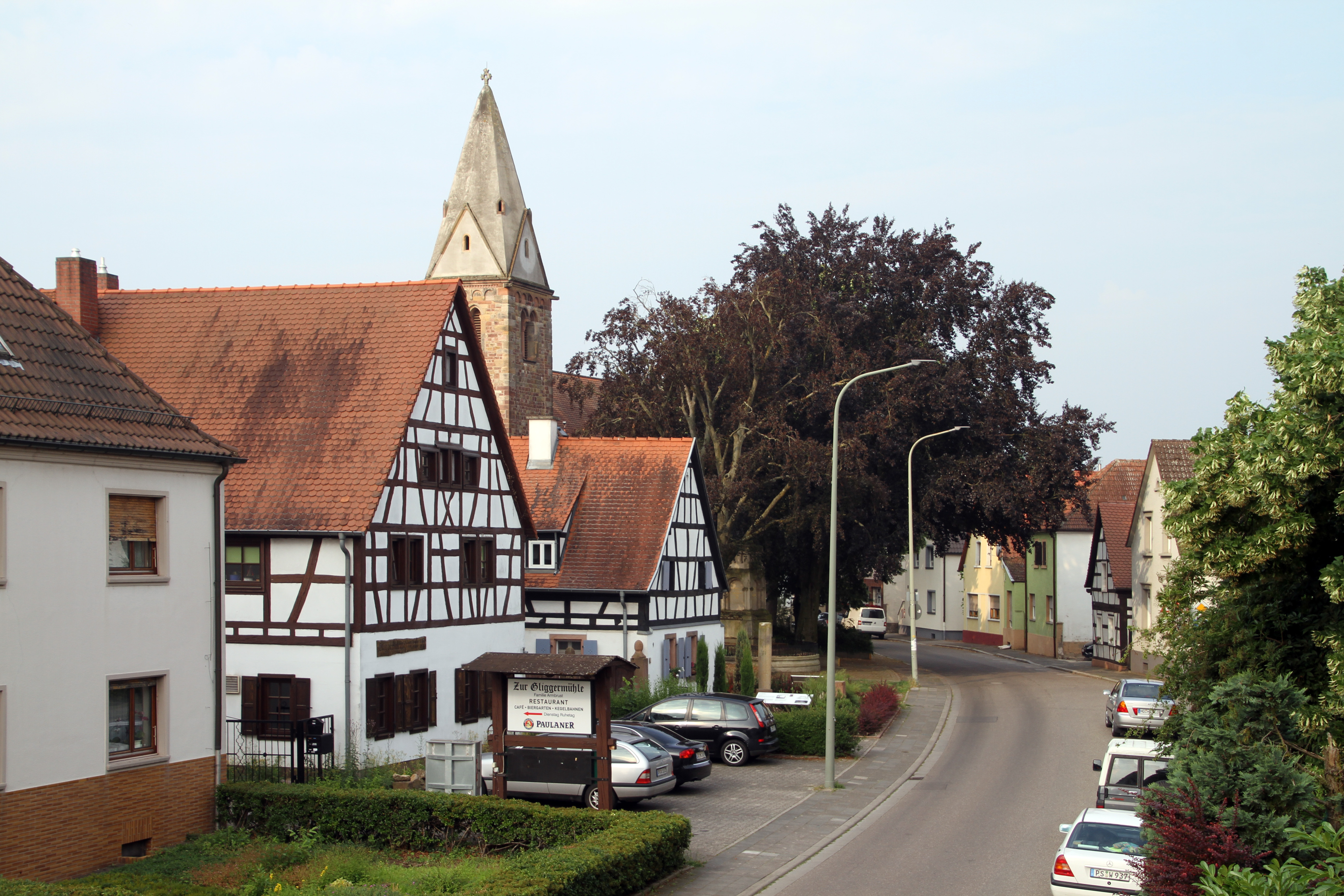

- Coat of arms

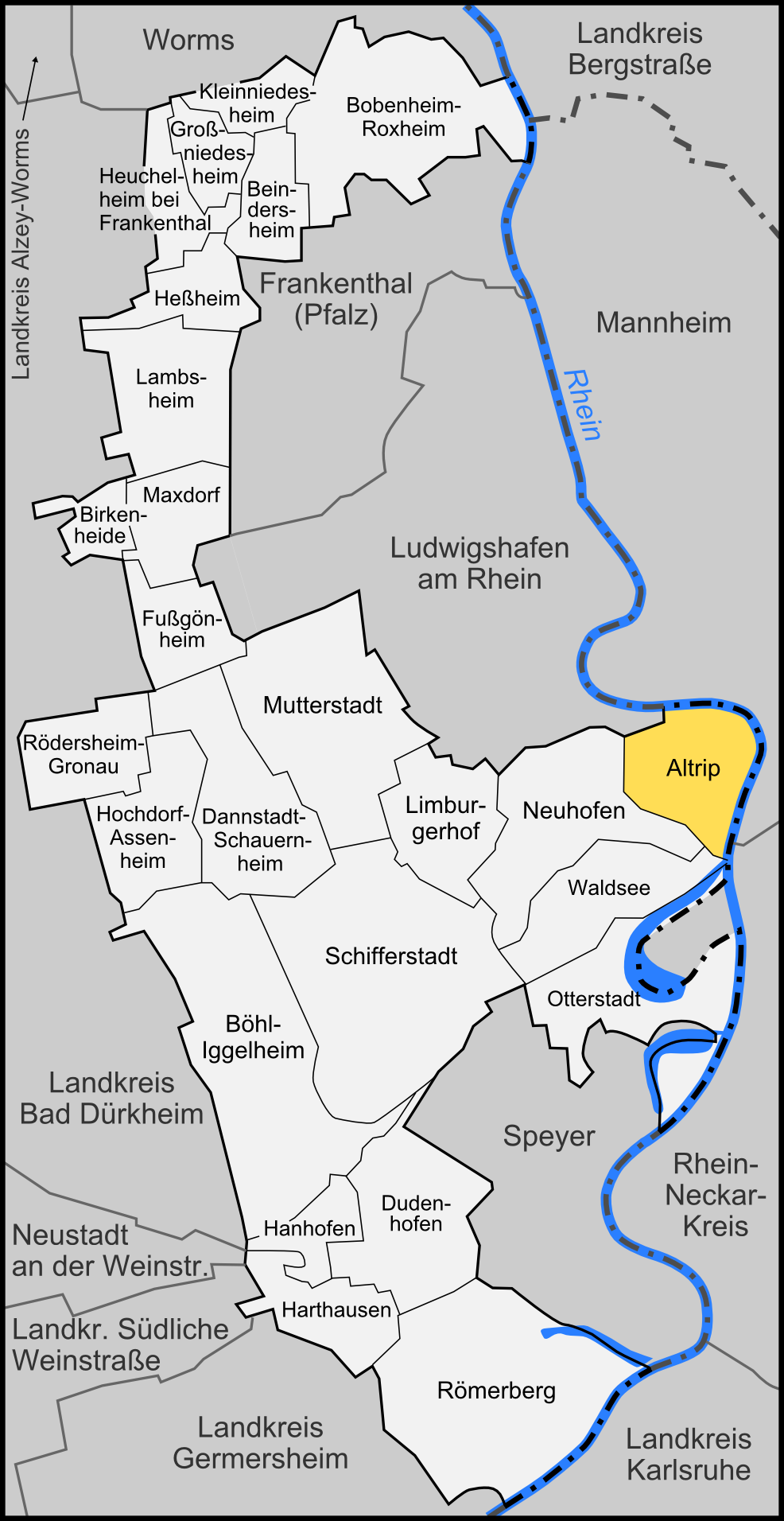
- Location of Altrip within Rhein-Pfalz-Kreis district
- Interactive map of Altrip
- Location within Germany Location within Rhineland-Palatinate
- Coordinates: 49°26′N 8°30′E
- Country: Germany
- State: Rhineland-Palatinate
- District: Rhein-Pfalz-Kreis
- Municipal assoc.: Rheinauen

Government
  - Mayor (2019–24): Volker Mansky

Area
  - Total: 10.47 km^{2} (4.04 sq mi)
- Elevation: 95 m (312 ft)

Population (2025-12-31)
  - Total: 7,610
  - Density: 727/km^{2} (1,880/sq mi)
- Time zone: UTC+01:00 (CET)
  - Summer (DST): UTC+02:00 (CEST)
- Postal codes: 67122
- Dialling codes: 06236
- Vehicle registration: RP
- Website: www.altrip.de

Altrip (German pronunciation: [ˈaltʁɪp]; Palatine German: Aldrib) is a municipality in the Rhein-Pfalz-Kreis, in Rhineland-Palatinate, Germany. It is situated on the left bank of the Rhine, approx. 7 km southeast of Ludwigshafen. The population in 2022 was 7,728.

== Sister city ==
Altrip has one sister city:

- Kutztown, Pennsylvania, United States
