= Heßheim (Verbandsgemeinde) =

Coordinates: 49.546°N 8.309°E

Heßheim is a former Verbandsgemeinde ("collective municipality") in the district Rhein-Pfalz-Kreis, in Rhineland-Palatinate, Germany. On 1 July 2014 it merged into the new Verbandsgemeinde Lambsheim-Heßheim.

The seat of the Verbandsgemeinde was in Heßheim.

The Verbandsgemeinde Heßheim consisted of the following Ortsgemeinden ("local municipalities"):

Verbandsgemeinde; Heßheim		9 719 inhabitants	24.9 km²
	Beindersheim	3 054 inhabitants	5.7 km²
	Großniedesheim	1 391 inhabitants	3.8 km²
	Heßheim	3 060 inhabitants	5.8 km²
	Heuchelheim bei Frankenthal	1 272 inhabitants	5.8 km²
	Kleinniedesheim	942 inhabitants	3.9 km²

^{*}seat of the Verbandsgemeinde
