= Hochdorf-Assenheim =

- Municipality
- Coat of arms

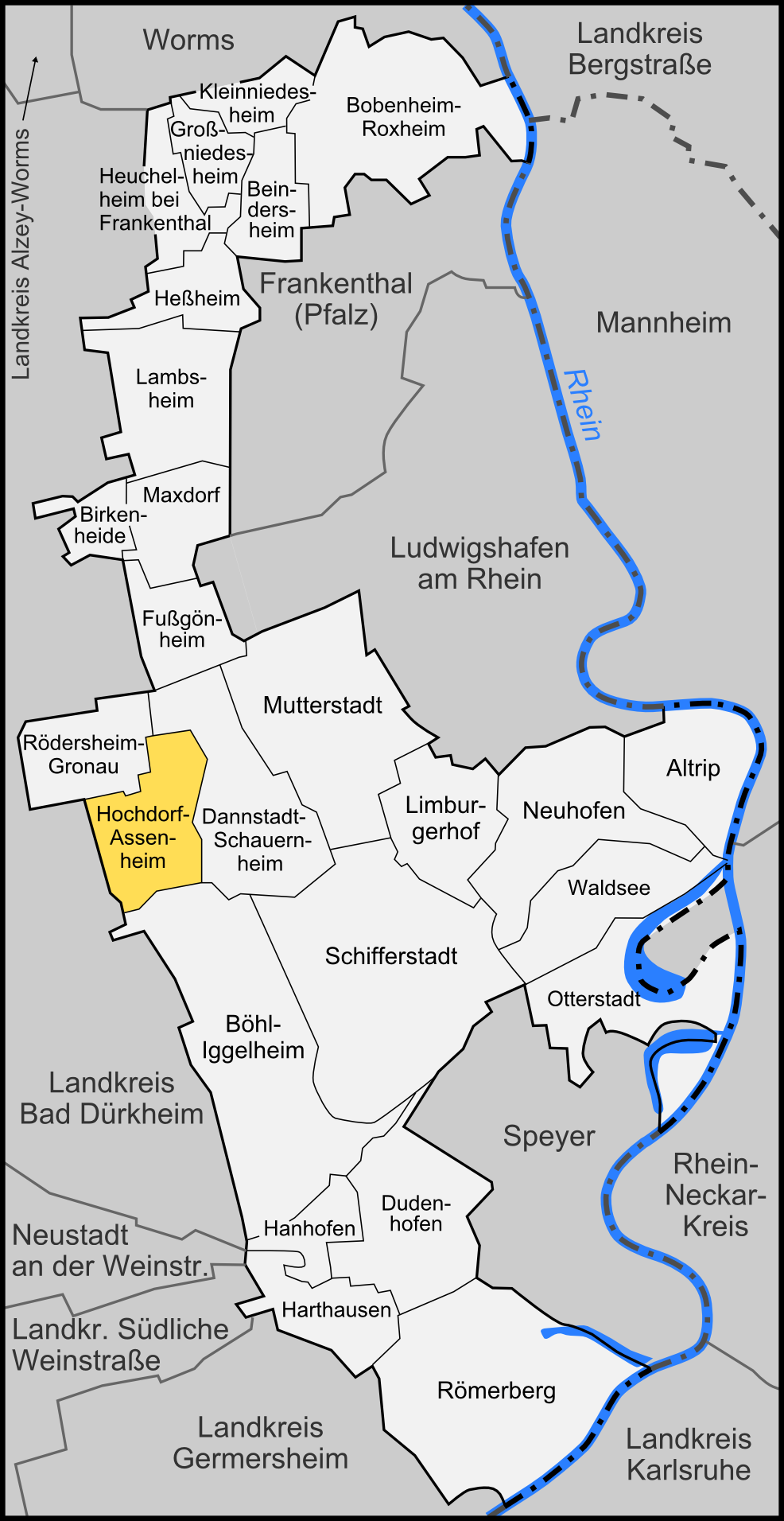
- Location of Hochdorf-Assenheim within Rhein-Pfalz-Kreis district
- Interactive map of Hochdorf-Assenheim
- Location within Germany Location within Rhineland-Palatinate
- Coordinates: 49°25′N 8°17′E
- Country: Germany
- State: Rhineland-Palatinate
- District: Rhein-Pfalz-Kreis

Government
  - Mayor (2019–24): Walter Schmitt (FW)

Area
  - Total: 9.71 km^{2} (3.75 sq mi)
- Elevation: 110 m (360 ft)

Population (2025-12-31)
  - Total: 3,017
  - Density: 311/km^{2} (805/sq mi)
- Time zone: UTC+01:00 (CET)
  - Summer (DST): UTC+02:00 (CEST)
- Postal codes: 67126
- Dialling codes: 06231
- Vehicle registration: RP
- Website: www.vg-dannstadt-schauernheim.de

Hochdorf-Assenheim (German pronunciation: [ˈhoːxdɔʁf ˈʔasn̩haɪm]) is a municipality in the Rhein-Pfalz-Kreis, in Rhineland-Palatinate, Germany. It is a member of the Dannstadt-Schauernheim collective municipality, together with Dannstadt-Schauernheim and Rödersheim-Gronau.

It consists of the villages of Assenheim and Hochdorf, which were merged in 1969.
