= Birkenheide =

- Municipality
- Coat of arms

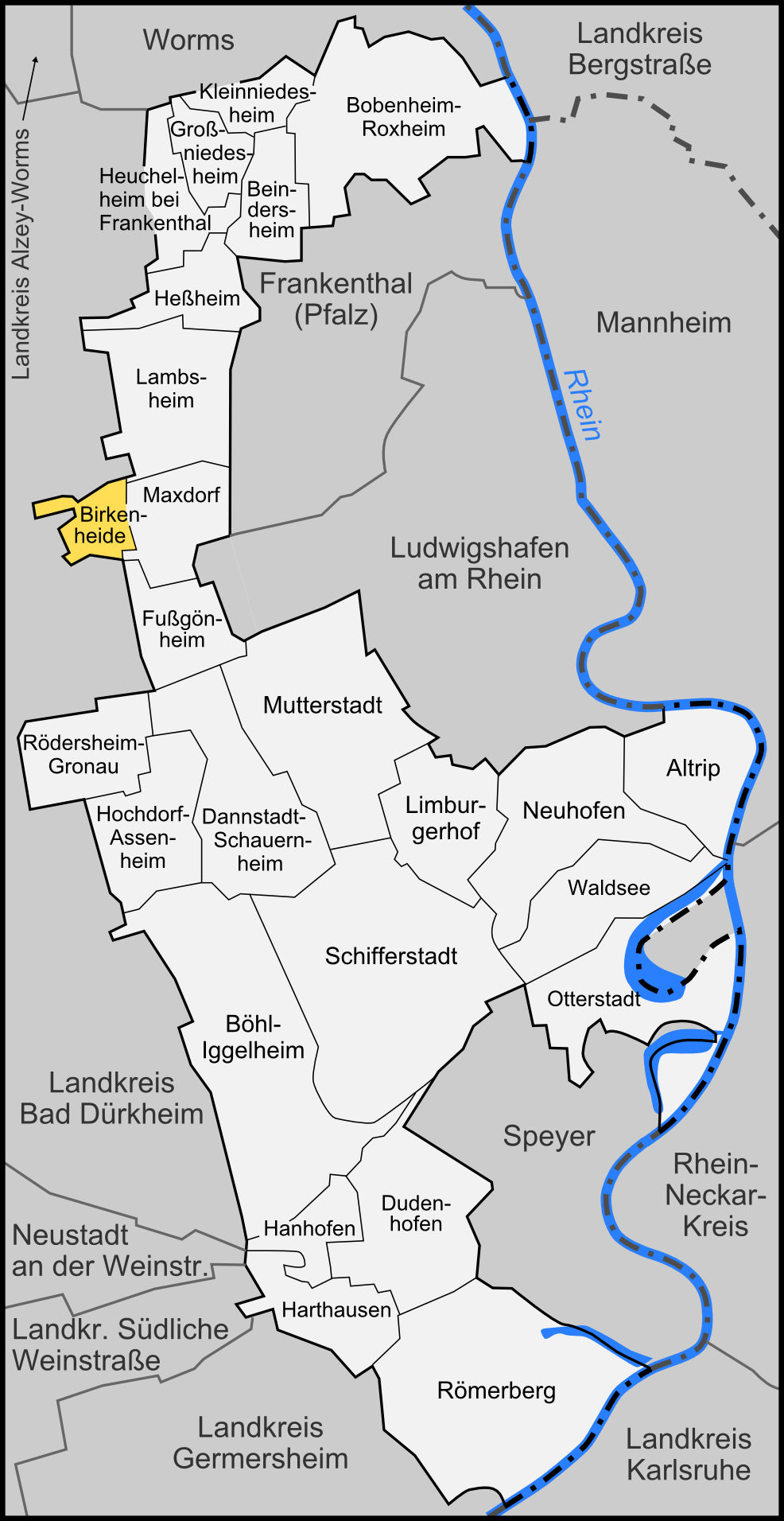
- Location of Birkenheide within Rhein-Pfalz-Kreis district
- Interactive map of Birkenheide
- Location within Germany Location within Rhineland-Palatinate
- Coordinates: 49°29′N 8°16′E
- Country: Germany
- State: Rhineland-Palatinate
- District: Rhein-Pfalz-Kreis

Government
  - Mayor (2019–24): Rainer Reiß (CDU)

Area
  - Total: 2.93 km^{2} (1.13 sq mi)
- Elevation: 90 m (300 ft)

Population (2025-12-31)
  - Total: 3,159
  - Density: 1,080/km^{2} (2,790/sq mi)
- Time zone: UTC+01:00 (CET)
  - Summer (DST): UTC+02:00 (CEST)
- Postal codes: 67134
- Dialling codes: 06237
- Vehicle registration: RP
- Website: www.birkenheide.de

Birkenheide (German pronunciation: [bɪʁkn̩ˈhaɪdə]) is a municipality in the Rhein-Pfalz-Kreis, in Rhineland-Palatinate, Germany and is part of the Verbandsgemeinde Maxdorf.

== Geography ==
Birkenheide is located about 10 kilometers west of Ludwigshafen in the Palatinate. Adjacent communities - clockwise starting north - are Weisenheim am Sand, Lambsheim, Maxdorf, Fußgönheim, Ellerstadt, Bad Dürkheim and Erpolzheim.

== History ==
In 1936, the Großsiedlung Hundertmorgen was built on a stretch of land by the German Labor Front, where Eyersheim had been located before it was abandoned. The settlement had 528 people and was initially managed by Weisenheim am Sand. In 1939, the settlement was expanded by the development of today's town center with larger one- and two-family houses. In 1946, the population had grown to about 1200, mainly by immigrants and refugees who were housed in makeshift shelters in the northeast of the village.

On 1 October 1952 the settlement became the independent municipality Birkenheide. Its first mayor was Albertine Scherer. Soon a separate elementary school, kindergartens, a fire station and other communal facilities were built. The temporary housing facilities were replaced between 1964 and 1970 by blocks of flats and houses.

In 1970 Birkenheide made an incorporation agreement with Ludwigshafen, however this was rejected by Maxdorf and the Rhineland-Palatinate government. A subsequent lawsuit was unsuccessful. In 1983, the village community house was built.

== Religion ==
The Protestant church, the Lukaskirche, was built in 1951 due to a post-war emergency church program and was designed by Otto Bartning. As the church remained relatively unchanged, it has been listed as a Kulturdenkmal.

The first Catholic church was built in 1968, but was replaced by the new church of St. Josef in 1995. The building includes meeting and youth rooms.

On October 31, 2014, 36.079% of the population was Protestant, 28.321% Catholic, 3.522% had other religions, and 32.088% undenominational or unspecified.

== Politics ==
=== Municipal council ===
The municipal council of Birkenheide consists of 20 council members, who were elected in last election on 25 May 2014.

Municipal Council 2014			Municipal Council 2009			Municipal Council 2004
Party	Votes	Seats	Party	Votes	Seats	Party	Votes	Seats
SPD	40.5%	8	SPD	42.5%	9	SPD	33.5 %	7
CDU	42.7%	9	CDU	52.5%	11	CDU	59.7%	12
FWG	16.7%	3				FDP	6.7%	1
Voter Participation: 62.5%			Voter Participation: 63.2%			Voter Participation: 67.6%

=== Mayor ===
The current voluntary mayor of Birkenheide is Rainer Reiß (CDU), elected in May 2019.

=== Coat of Arms ===
Blazon: "Divided in black and gold, on the top half three silver birch trees, on the botton half a red mill wheel."

It was approved in 1979 by the district government of Neustadt an der Weinstraße.

== Sights ==
=== Natural monuments ===
The Silbergrasflur (grey hair-grass land parcel) was declared a natural monument in 1987.

== Infrastructure ==
Birkenheide is located north of Bundesautobahn 650. There are bus connections to the surrounding towns. In Maxdorf, Fußgönheim and Ellerstadt there are stops of the Stadtbahn Bad Dürkheim-Ludwigshafen (formerly Rhein-Haardtbahn). Birkenheide is part of the tariff area of the Verkehrsverbund Rhein-Neckar.

=== Education ===
In Birkenheide there are two kindergartens and a primary school.
