= Christian Grimm =

German footballer

Personal information
- Date of birth: February 4, 1987 (age 39)
- Place of birth: Frankenthal, West Germany
- Height: 1.70 m (5 ft 7 in)
- Position: Attacking midfielder

Team information
- Current team: VfR Mannheim

Youth career
- –2008: ASV Fußgönheim

Senior career*
Years	Team	Apps	(Gls)
2008–2011	FSV Mainz 05 II	95	(14)
2011–2014	SV Elversberg	78	(6)
2014–2015	FC Homburg	21	(1)
2015–2019	FK Pirmasens	67	(18)
2019–	VfR Mannheim	0	(0)
- * Club domestic league appearances and goals as of 00:48, 27 July 2019 (UTC)

Christian Grimm (born February 4, 1987) is a German footballer who plays for VfR Mannheim.

== Career ==
=== VfR Mannheim ===
Ahead of the 2019/20 season, Grimm joined VfR Mannheim.
