= Hochdorf, Rhein-Pfalz-Kreis =

Hochdorf
- Ortsteil of Hochdorf-Assenheim
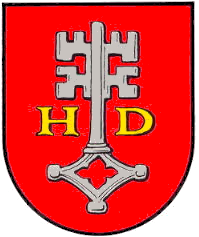
- Coat of arms
- Interactive map of Hochdorf
- Location within Germany Location within Rhineland-Palatinate
- Coordinates: 49.4164°N 8.2723°E
- Country: Germany
- State: Rhineland-Palatinate
- District: Rhein-Pfalz-Kreis
- Municipality: Hochdorf-Assenheim
- Elevation: 108 m (354 ft)
- Time zone: UTC+01:00 (CET)
  - Summer (DST): UTC+02:00 (CEST)
- Postal codes: 67126
- Dialling codes: 06231
- Website: www.vg-dannstadt-schauernheim.de

Hochdorf (German pronunciation: [ˈhoːxdɔʁf]) is one of the two former municipalities that were combined to form the municipality of Hochdorf-Assenheim in Rhein-Pfalz-Kreis in Rhineland-Palatinate, Germany. It is located in the southwestern part of the municipality, with the Marlach river crossing the northern edge.

== History ==
Until the French Revolution, Hochdorf belonged to the Bishopric of Speyer. From 1798 to 1814, when the Palatinate was part of the French Republic (which became the Napoleonic Empire in 1804), Hochdorf was in the Canton of Mutterstadt. After the Congress of Vienna in 1815, Hochdorf initially belonged to the Austrian Empire and then moved to the Kingdom of Bavaria in 1816. From 1818 to 1862 it belonged to the Landkommissariat Speyer. From 1886, Hochdorf was part of the newly created Bezirksamts Ludwigshafen. In 1928 Hochdorf had 776 inhabitants, who lived in 139 residential buildings. The Catholics had their own parish, while the Protestants belonged to that of Meckenheim. Since 1938, the village has been part of the Ludwigshafen district (Landkreises Ludwigshafen), which has been called Rhein-Pfalz-Kreis since 2004. After the Second World War, Hochdorf was part of the then newly formed state of Rhineland-Palatinate within the French occupation zone. On June 7, 1969, during the course of the first regional reorganization in Rhineland-Palatinate, Hochdorf was merged with the neighboring municipality of Assenheim, to form Hochdorf-Assenheim.
