= Dannstadt-Schauernheim (Verbandsgemeinde) =

- Verbandsgemeinde
- Interactive map of Dannstadt-Schauernheim
- Location within Germany Location within Rhineland-Palatinate
- Coordinates: 49°26′N 8°19′E
- Country: Germany
- State: Rhineland-Palatinate
- District: Rhein-Pfalz-Kreis
- Seat: Dannstadt-Schauernheim
- Subdivisions: 3 municipalities

Area
  - Total: 33.19 km^{2} (12.81 sq mi)

Population (2025-12-31)
  - Total: 13,423
  - Density: 404.4/km^{2} (1,047/sq mi)
- Time zone: UTC+01:00 (CET)
  - Summer (DST): UTC+02:00 (CEST)
- Website: www.vg-dannstadt-schauernheim.de

Dannstadt-Schauernheim is a Verbandsgemeinde ("collective municipality") in the district Rhein-Pfalz-Kreis, in Rhineland-Palatinate, Germany.

The seat of the Verbandsgemeinde is in Dannstadt-Schauernheim.

The Verbandsgemeinde Dannstadt-Schauernheim consists of the following Ortsgemeinden ("local municipalities"):

Verbandsgemeinde; Dannstadt- Schauernheim	13 022 inhabitants	33.2 km^{2}
Dannstadt- Schauernheim	7 033 inhabitants	15.3 km^{2}
Hochdorf- Assenheim	3 113 inhabitants	9.7 km^{2}
Rödersheim- Gronau	2 876 inhabitants	8.2 km^{2}
