= Assenheim =

Municipality in Germany

- Ortsteil of Hochdorf-Assenheim
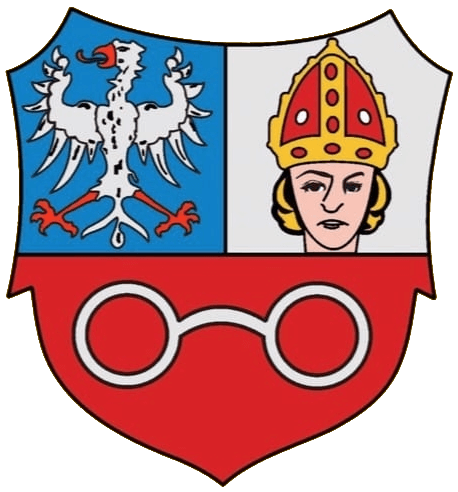
- Coat of arms
- Interactive map of Assenheim
- Location within Germany Location within Rhineland-Palatinate
- Coordinates: 49.4244°N 8.2858°E
- Country: Germany
- State: Rhineland-Palatinate
- District: Rhein-Pfalz-Kreis
- Municipality: Hochdorf-Assenheim
- Elevation: 103 m (338 ft)
- Time zone: UTC+01:00 (CET)
  - Summer (DST): UTC+02:00 (CEST)
- Postal codes: 67126
- Dialling codes: 06231
- Website: https://www.vg-dannstadt-schauernheim.de

Assenheim (German pronunciation: [ˈasn̩haɪm]) is one of the two former municipalities that were combined to form the municipality of Hochdorf-Assenheim in Rhein-Pfalz-Kreis in Rhineland-Palatinate, Germany. It is located in the north-eastern part of the municipality, with the Marlach river flowing through it.

== History ==
Until the French Revolution, Assenheim belonged to the House of Leiningen-Dagsburg. From 1798 to 1814, when the Palatinate was part of the French Republic (which became the Napoleonic Empire in 1804), Assenheim was in the Canton of Mutterstadt. After the Congress of Vienna in 1815, Assenheim initially belonged to the Austrian Empire and then moved to the Kingdom of Bavaria in 1816. From 1818 to 1862, it belonged to the Landkommissariat Speyer. From 1886, Assenheim was part of the newly created Bezirksamts Ludwigshafen.

In 1928, Assenheim had 524 inhabitants, who lived in 109 households. At the time, the Catholics belonged to the parish of Hochdorf, while the Protestants belonged to that of Dannstadt. Since 1938 the village has been part of the Ludwigshafen district (Landkreis Ludwigshafen), which has been called Rhein-Pfalz-Kreis since 2004. After the Second World War, Assenheim was part of the then newly formed state of Rhineland-Palatinate within the French occupation zone. On June 7, 1969, during the course of the first regional reorganization in Rhineland-Palatinate Assenheim was merged with the neighboring municipality of Hochdorf to form Hochdorf-Assenheim.
