= Lambsheim-Heßheim =

- Verbandsgemeinde
- Coat of arms
- Interactive map of Lambsheim-Heßheim
- Location within Germany Location within Rhineland-Palatinate
- Coordinates: 49°31′N 8°17′E
- Country: Germany
- State: Rhineland-Palatinate
- District: Rhein-Pfalz-Kreis
- Seat: Lambsheim
- Subdivisions: 6 municipalities

Area
  - Total: 37.68 km^{2} (14.55 sq mi)

Population (2025-12-31)
  - Total: 17,017
  - Density: 451.6/km^{2} (1,170/sq mi)
- Time zone: UTC+01:00 (CET)
  - Summer (DST): UTC+02:00 (CEST)
- Website: www.lambsheim-hessheim.de

Lambsheim-Heßheim is a Verbandsgemeinde ("collective municipality") in the district Rhein-Pfalz-Kreis, in Rhineland-Palatinate, Germany. The seat of the Verbandsgemeinde is in Lambsheim. It was formed on 1 July 2014 by the merger of the former Verbandsgemeinde Heßheim and the formerly independent municipality Lambsheim.

The Verbandsgemeinde Lambsheim-Heßheim consists of the following Ortsgemeinden ("local municipalities"):

Verbandsgemeinde; Lambsheim-Heßheim	16 626 inhabitants	37.68 km²
Beindersheim	3 259 inhabitants	5.73 km²
Großniedesheim	1 238 inhabitants	3.78 km²
Heßheim	3 019 inhabitants	5.78 km²
Heuchelheim bei Frankenthal	1 277 inhabitants	5.76 km²
Kleinniedesheim	937 inhabitants	3.88 km²
Lambsheim	6 896 inhabitants	12.75 km²
