= Fußgönheim =

- Municipality
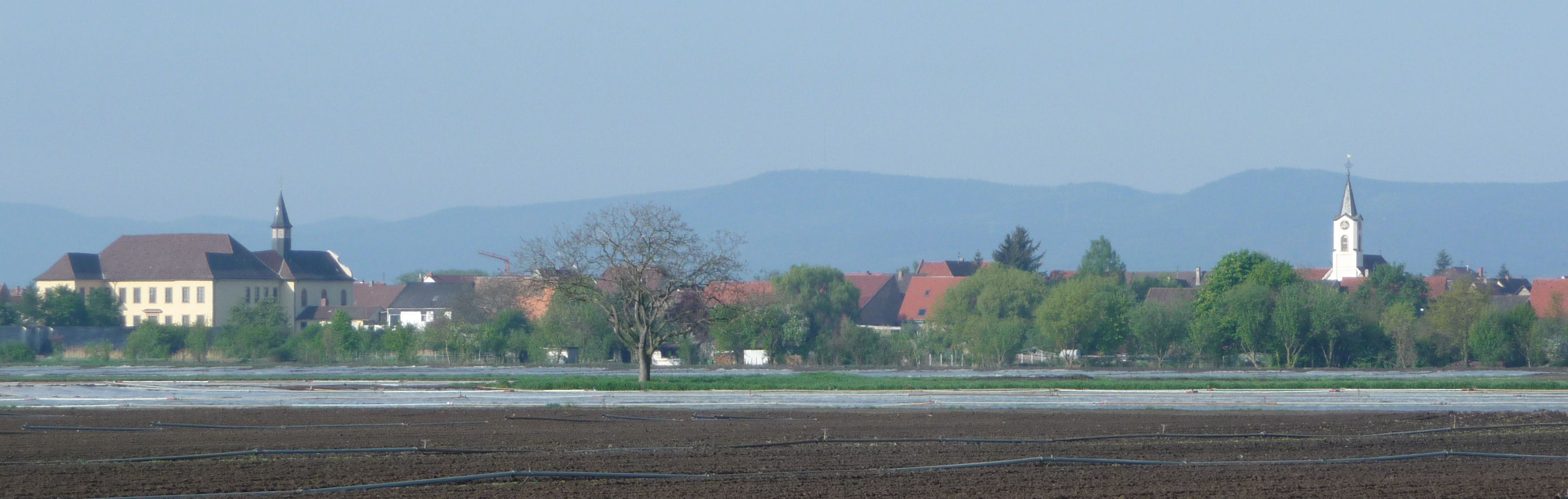

- Coat of arms

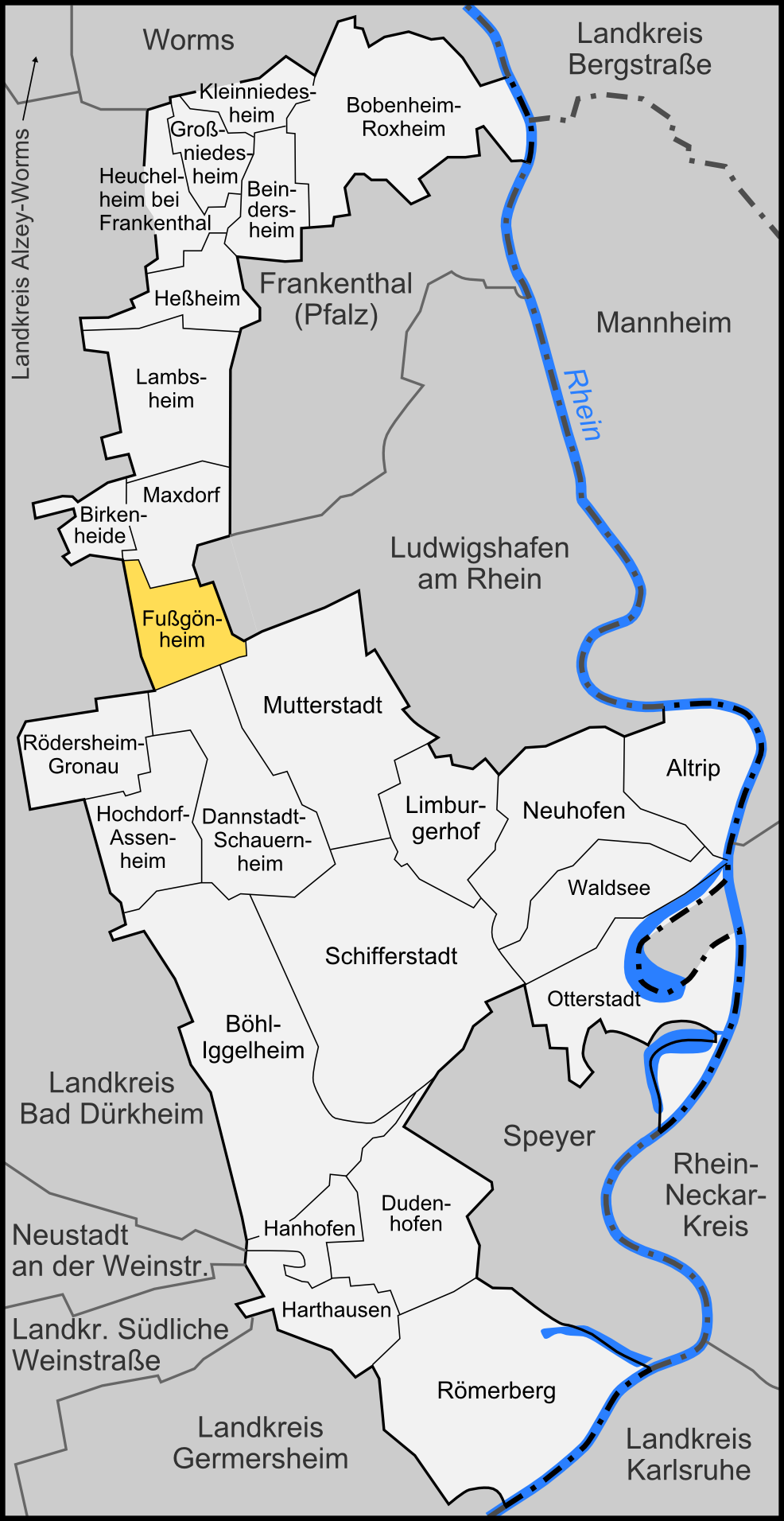
- Location of Fußgönheim within Rhein-Pfalz-Kreis district
- Interactive map of Fußgönheim
- Location within Germany Location within Rhineland-Palatinate
- Coordinates: 49°27′37″N 8°17′37″E
- Country: Germany
- State: Rhineland-Palatinate
- District: Rhein-Pfalz-Kreis

Government
  - Mayor (2019–24): Jochen Schubert (FW)

Area
  - Total: 6.65 km^{2} (2.57 sq mi)
- Elevation: 99 m (325 ft)

Population (2025-12-31)
  - Total: 2,543
  - Density: 382/km^{2} (990/sq mi)
- Time zone: UTC+01:00 (CET)
  - Summer (DST): UTC+02:00 (CEST)
- Postal codes: 67136
- Dialling codes: 06237
- Vehicle registration: RP
- Website: www.fussgoenheim.de

Fußgönheim (German pronunciation: [fuːsˈɡœnhaɪm]) is a municipality in the Rhein-Pfalz-Kreis, in Rhineland-Palatinate, Germany. It is a member of the Verbandsgemeinde Maxdorf, together with Maxdorf and Birkenheide.

== History ==
Archaeological findings indicate a settlement existed at the time of the Celts and Romans. The first certified documentary evidence comes from the list of goods of the Prüm Abbey from the year 893.

Fußgönheim was owned by members of the Salian dynasty from 900 to 1100, and later the sovereignty changed to the Electoral Palatinate. Fußgönheim was divided into an upper village (Oberdorf) and a lower village (Unterdorf), and became a fief of the families of Falkenstein and Bolanden. Later, the Bolandian possession was sold to the Count of Leiningen. In 1728, Jakob Tillmann von Hallberg from the House of Hallberg purchased the hereditary claim of the upper village and one year later he bought the lower village, after which Charles III Philip conferred the right of sovereign over the village to him. In 1740, Jakob Tillmann von Hallberg built Castle Hallberg with a church and introduced the Catholic confession to the place which had been Lutheran since the Reformation. The reign of the Hallberg family ended with the conquest of the Palatinate by the French, who incorporated the village into the Canton of Mutterstadt of the Department of Mont-Tonnerre.

Since the departure of the French in 1818, the leadership of the municipality was subject to the mayor and the municipal council. The town was first administered by the District Office of Speyer of the "Bavarian Rheinkreis," which was later renamed "Palatinate." In 1886, Fußgönheim went to Ludwigshafen, a newly formed district, and is now part of the Rhein-Pfalz-Kreis.

The BASF settlement was built between 1933 and 1940. It was later incorporated, with its 1,602 inhabitants, into the neighboring town of Maxdorf, as part of a regional reorganization on June 7, 1969.

== Demographics ==
=== Population development ===
Population details were first recorded in 1560, at which time around 150-200 people were living there. Until the 19th century, only the eastern route through the village, consisting of Hauptstraße and Ruchheimer Straße, was populated. The settlement of many peasants, craftsmen and merchants led to a strong population increase in the first half of the 19th century from about 500 inhabitants in 1815 to 1,000 in 1840. During this period, the settlement expanded in a westerly direction. Until 1900, the local boundaries remained virtually unchanged, after which most new development was on the western side of the original centre as the steep slope to the Niederterrasse on the eastern border constituted a problem. In 1950, the population of reached 1,500. This was mainly due to building the western road from Bahnhofstraße and Speyerer Straße. The largest increase in population occurred in the 1960s and 1970s following the designation of development areas, and by 1988 had risen to 2,565.

=== Religion ===
On October 31, 2014, 40.3 percent of the population was Protestant and 25.6 percent Catholic. The rest belonged to another religion or were nondenominational.

== Politics ==
=== Coat of arms ===
Coat of arms

The blazon of the coat of arms is: Per fess, the chief per pale. First Or, a wheel gules of six spokes, second azure, an eagle argent armed and langued gules, third a fox courant gules.

It was approved in 1927 by the Bavarian State Ministry of the Interior. The fox refers to the origin of the town name, which is derived from Fuchs-Gönheim [lit. fox-Gönheim]. The wheel is reminiscent of the coat of arms of House Bolanden and the eagle of that of the House of Leiningen, both of which are former rulers of the town.

== See also ==
- Palatinate (region)
