= Heßheim =

- Municipality
- Coat of arms

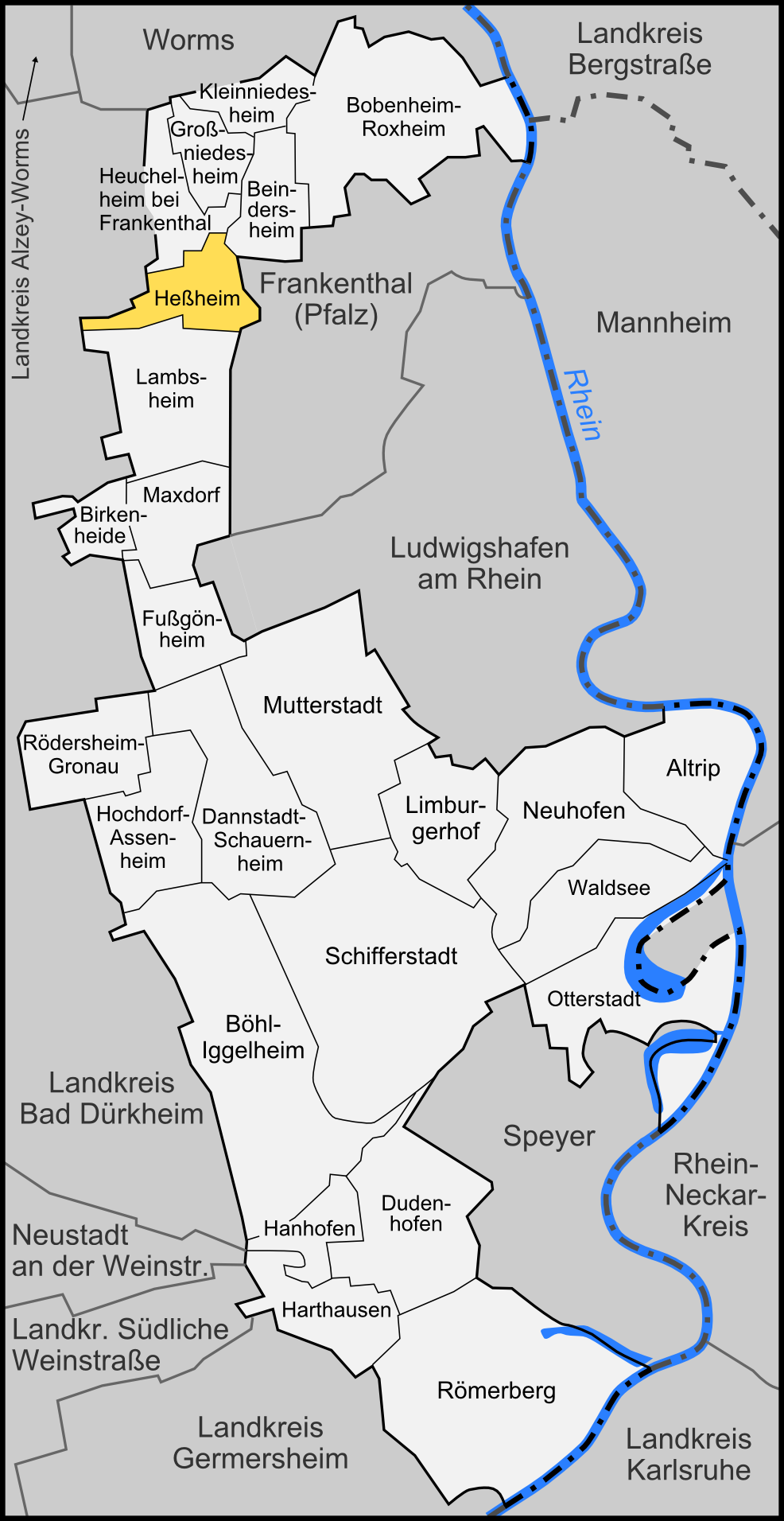
- Location of Heßheim within Rhein-Pfalz-Kreis district
- Interactive map of Heßheim
- Location within Germany Location within Rhineland-Palatinate
- Coordinates: 49°32′45″N 8°18′32″E
- Country: Germany
- State: Rhineland-Palatinate
- District: Rhein-Pfalz-Kreis
- Municipal assoc.: Lambsheim-Heßheim

Government
  - Mayor (2019–24): Holger Korn (SPD)

Area
  - Total: 5.78 km^{2} (2.23 sq mi)
- Elevation: 100 m (330 ft)

Population (2025-12-31)
  - Total: 3,079
  - Density: 533/km^{2} (1,380/sq mi)
- Time zone: UTC+01:00 (CET)
  - Summer (DST): UTC+02:00 (CEST)
- Postal codes: 67258
- Dialling codes: 06233
- Vehicle registration: RP
- Website: www.vghessheim.de

Heßheim is a municipality in the Rhein-Pfalz-Kreis, in Rhineland-Palatinate, Germany. It is situated approximately 4 km west of Frankenthal.

Heßheim was the seat of the former Verbandsgemeinde ("collective municipality") Heßheim.

== Politics ==
=== Municipal Council ===
Municipal Council 2014
Party	Votes	Seats
SPD	50.8%	11
CDU	35.6%	7
FWG	13.6%	2
Voter Participation: 62.1%

=== Mayor ===
The mayor of Heßheim is Holger Korn (SPD).
