= Maxdorf (Verbandsgemeinde) =

- Verbandsgemeinde
- Coat of arms
- Interactive map of Maxdorf
- Location within Germany Location within Rhineland-Palatinate
- Coordinates: 49°29′N 8°17′E
- Country: Germany
- State: Rhineland-Palatinate
- District: Rhein-Pfalz-Kreis
- Seat: Maxdorf
- Subdivisions: 3 municipalities

Area
  - Total: 16.93 km^{2} (6.54 sq mi)

Population (2025-12-31)
  - Total: 12,824
  - Density: 757.5/km^{2} (1,962/sq mi)
- Time zone: UTC+01:00 (CET)
  - Summer (DST): UTC+02:00 (CEST)
- Website: www.vg-maxdorf.de

Maxdorf is a Verbandsgemeinde ("collective municipality") in the district Rhein-Pfalz-Kreis, in Rhineland-Palatinate, Germany.

The seat of the Verbandsgemeinde is in Maxdorf.

The Verbandsgemeinde Maxdorf consists of the following Ortsgemeinden ("local municipalities"):

Verbandsgemeinde; Maxdorf	12 687 inhabitants	16.9 km^{2}
Birkenheide	3 192 inhabitants	2.9 km^{2}
Fußgönheim	2 484 inhabitants	6.7 km^{2}
Maxdorf	7 011 inhabitants	7.4 km^{2}
