= Castle Hallberg =

Castle complex in Rhineland-Palatinate, Germany

- Hallbergsche Schloss
- Near Fußgönheim in Germany
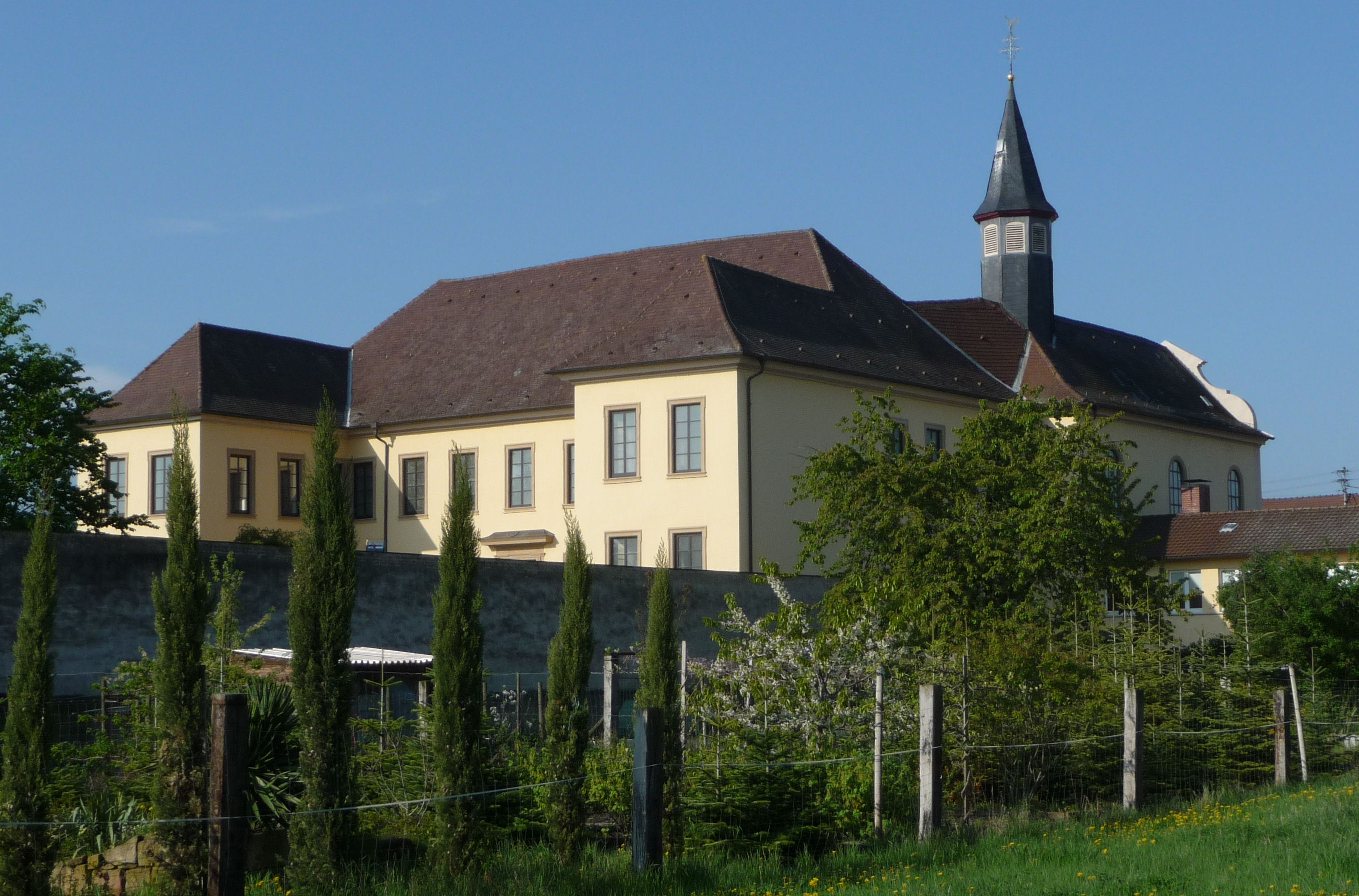
- Castle Hallberg

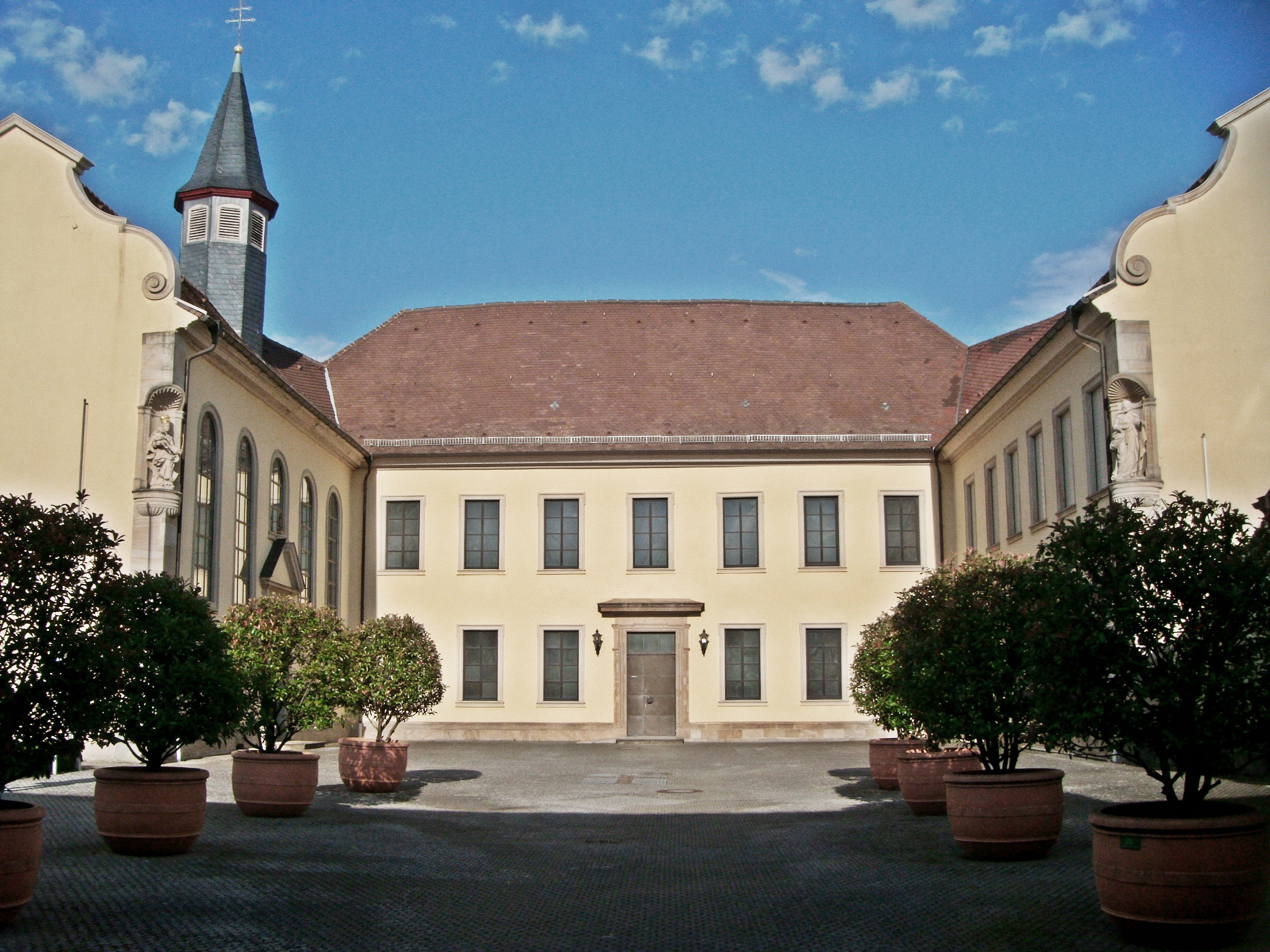
- Courtyard side, with Church wing on left

Site information
- Type: Castle

Location
- Coordinates: 49°27′27″N 8°17′42″E

Castle Hallberg (German: Hallbergsche Schloss) is a castle complex in the community of Fußgönheim in Rhineland-Palatinate, Germany.

== History ==
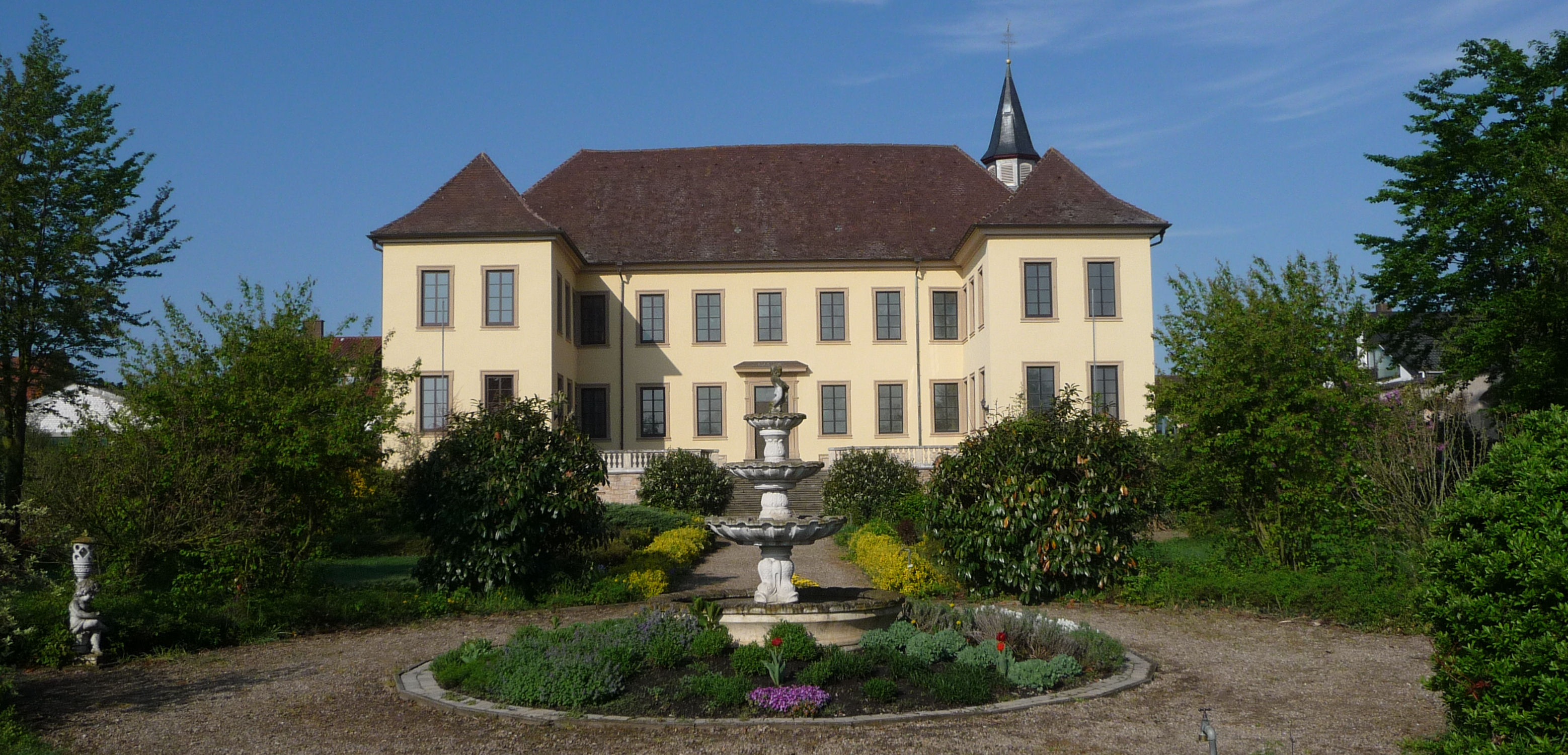
Garden side (backside)

The castle is located on the eastern edge of the town and was built between 1728 and 1731 for the Electoral Palatinate Chancellor Baron Jakob Tillmann von Hallberg from the House of Hallberg.

From 1788 to 1792, Heinrich Theodor von Hallberg (1725–1792), Electoral Palatinate-Bavarian envoy in Vienna, was the lord of the castle.

In 1815, Hallberg Castle was forcibly auctioned off and then changed hands several times. It was used as a shop, barn and warehouse. Among other things, the castle housed a cigar factory, a prisoner of war camp and a Raiffeisen magazine.

In 1972 the castle was acquired by the Catholic parish of Fußgönheim and restored at great expense. A large church room was set up in the formerly profane middle section and partly equipped with baroque inventory. This is today's St. James Catholic Church. The historic castle church now only forms a side chapel.
