= Maxdorf =

- Municipality
- Coat of arms

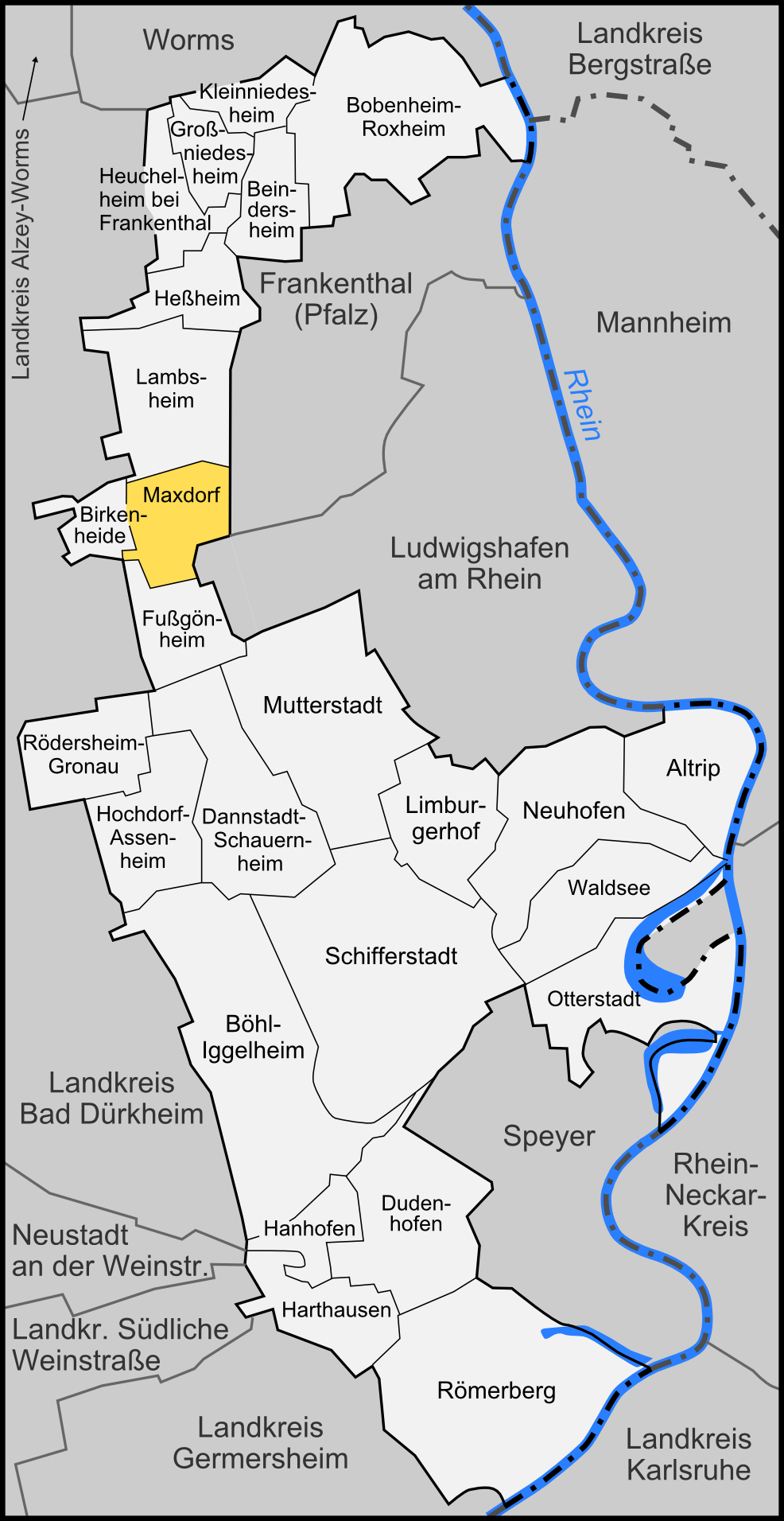
- Location of Maxdorf within Rhein-Pfalz-Kreis district
- Interactive map of Maxdorf
- Location within Germany Location within Rhineland-Palatinate
- Coordinates: 49°28′55″N 8°17′24″E
- Country: Germany
- State: Rhineland-Palatinate
- District: Rhein-Pfalz-Kreis
- Municipal assoc.: Maxdorf

Government
  - Mayor (2024–29): Werner Baumann (CDU)

Area
  - Total: 7.35 km^{2} (2.84 sq mi)
- Elevation: 95 m (312 ft)

Population (2025-12-31)
  - Total: 7,122
  - Density: 969/km^{2} (2,510/sq mi)
- Time zone: UTC+01:00 (CET)
  - Summer (DST): UTC+02:00 (CEST)
- Postal codes: 67133
- Dialling codes: 06237
- Vehicle registration: RP
- Website: https://www.vg-maxdorf.de/

Maxdorf (German pronunciation: [ˈmaksdɔʁf]) is a municipality in the Rhein-Pfalz-Kreis, in Rhineland-Palatinate, Germany. It is situated approximately 11 km west of Ludwigshafen. Maxdorf is also the seat of the Verbandsgemeinde ("collective municipality") Maxdorf.

== History ==
The area that would become Maxdorf was originally a timber yard in the 1700s until it was destroyed in the French Revolution in 1794. Gradually people started settling around the timber yard until 1819 when Maxdorf was formally founded by King Maximilian I Joseph of Bavaria. It was incorporated into Lambsheim in 1865. After the First World War, French soldiers occupied the village and destroyed the schoolhouse. During the Second World War, Nazi Germany used French prisoners of war to clear the streets of snow in 1941. Maxdorf was bombed by the Royal Air Force in 1944, which destroyed a third of the village's buildings.

In 1952, Maxdorf became an independent municipality again. They adopted a new coat of arms with a crown as a reference to King Maximilian I, the blue diamonds being a reference to the historical associations with Bavaria, the red and silver being a reference to Lambsheim and the golden tree referencing their former timber industry.

In the 1980s, Maxdorf was attacked by members of the communist Red Army Faction with them robbing the municipality's gun shop in 1984 and using the weapons that they stole to commit further crimes throughout West Germany. The stolen firearms were still being recovered as of 2024, with some being rediscovered as far away as Berlin.
