= Kleinniedesheim =

- Municipality
- Coat of arms

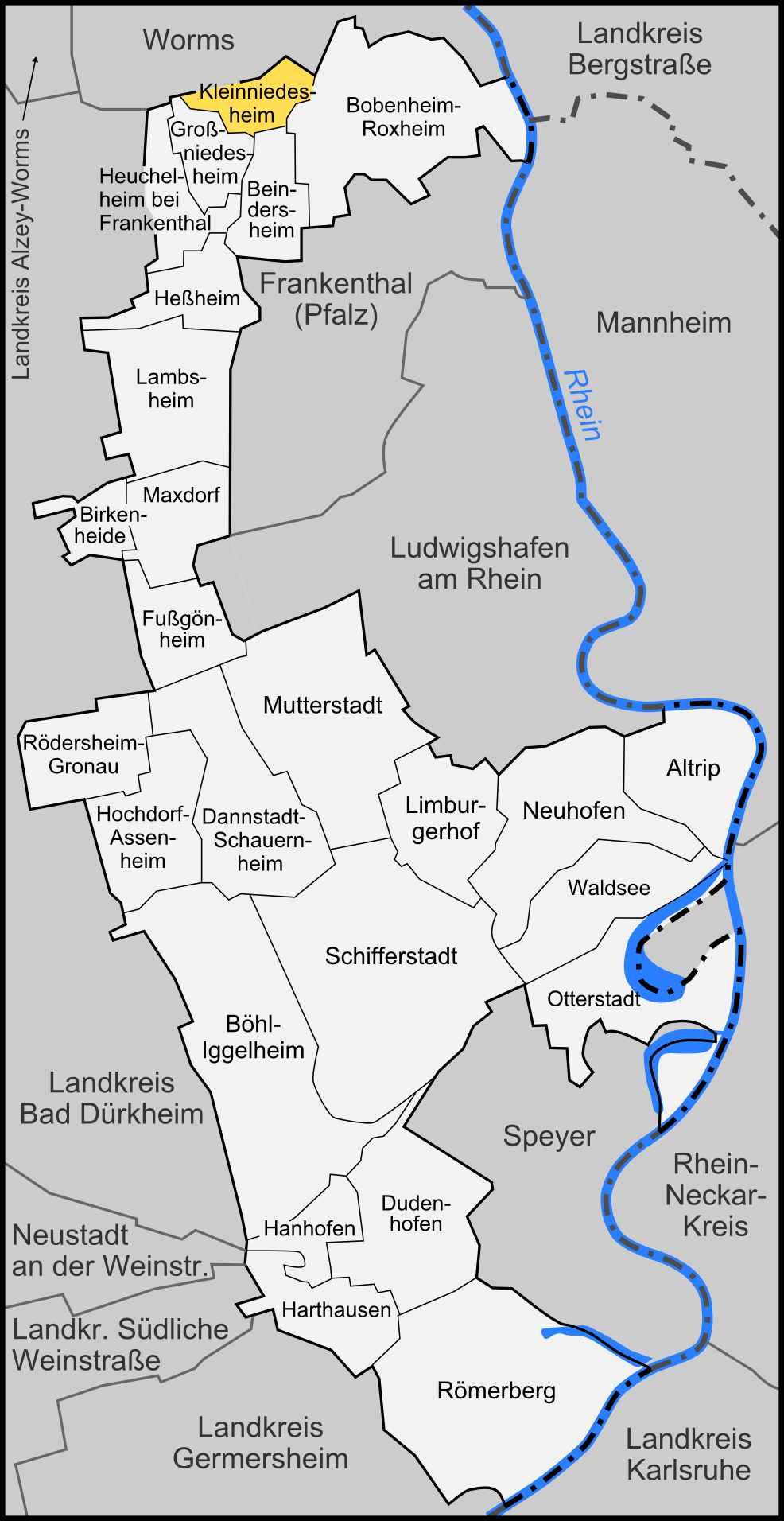
- Location of Kleinniedesheim within Rhein-Pfalz-Kreis district
- Interactive map of Kleinniedesheim
- Location within Germany Location within Rhineland-Palatinate
- Coordinates: 49°35′N 8°19′E
- Country: Germany
- State: Rhineland-Palatinate
- District: Rhein-Pfalz-Kreis
- Municipal assoc.: Lambsheim-Heßheim

Government
  - Mayor (2019–24): Ewald Merkel (FW)

Area
  - Total: 3.88 km^{2} (1.50 sq mi)
- Elevation: 110 m (360 ft)

Population (2025-12-31)
  - Total: 938
  - Density: 242/km^{2} (626/sq mi)
- Time zone: UTC+01:00 (CET)
  - Summer (DST): UTC+02:00 (CEST)
- Postal codes: 67259
- Dialling codes: 06239
- Vehicle registration: RP

Kleinniedesheim (German pronunciation: [klaɪnˈniːdəshaɪm], lit. 'Little Niedesheim', in contrast to "Great Niedesheim") is a municipality in the Rhein-Pfalz-Kreis, in Rhineland-Palatinate, Germany.

== Politics ==
=== Municipal Council ===
Municipal Council 2014
Party	Votes	Seats
SPD	19.4%	2
CDU	28.7%	3
FWG	51.9%	7
Voter Participation: 62.7%

=== Mayor ===
The mayor of Kleinniedesheim is Ewald Merkel (FWG).
