= Heuchelheim bei Frankenthal =

- Municipality
- Coat of arms

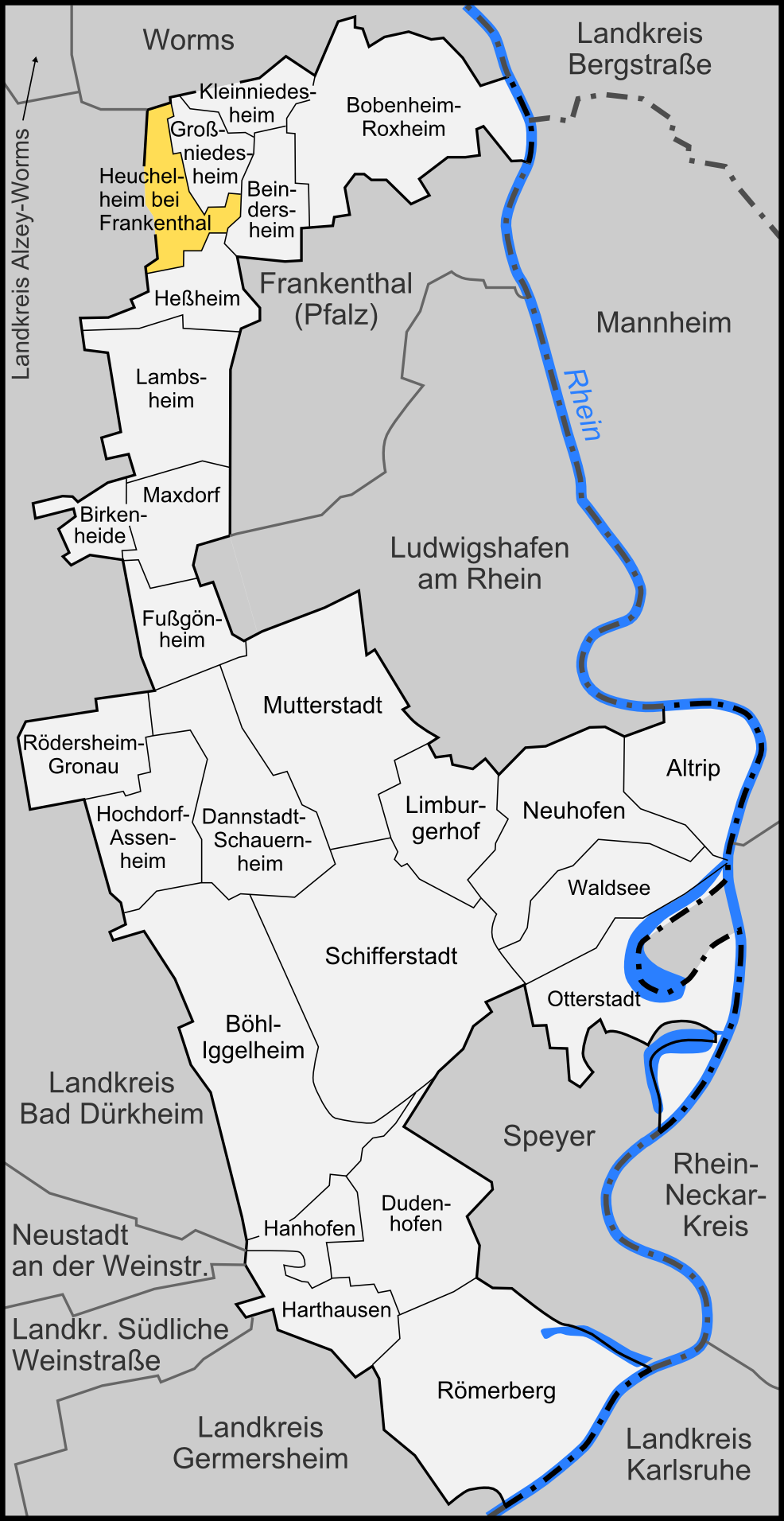
- Location of Heuchelheim bei Frankenthal within Rhein-Pfalz-Kreis district
- Interactive map of Heuchelheim bei Frankenthal
- Location within Germany Location within Rhineland-Palatinate
- Coordinates: 49°34′N 8°17′E
- Country: Germany
- State: Rhineland-Palatinate
- District: Rhein-Pfalz-Kreis
- Municipal assoc.: Lambsheim-Heßheim

Government
  - Mayor (2019–24): Frank Klingel

Area
  - Total: 5.76 km^{2} (2.22 sq mi)
- Elevation: 105 m (344 ft)

Population (2025-12-31)
  - Total: 1,275
  - Density: 221/km^{2} (573/sq mi)
- Time zone: UTC+01:00 (CET)
  - Summer (DST): UTC+02:00 (CEST)
- Postal codes: 67259
- Dialling codes: 06238
- Vehicle registration: RP
- Website: www.lambsheim-hessheim.de

Heuchelheim bei Frankenthal (German pronunciation: [ˈhɔʏçl̩haɪm baɪ ˈfʁaŋkn̩taːl], lit. 'Heuchelheim near Frankenthal') is a municipality in the Rhein-Pfalz-Kreis, in Rhineland-Palatinate, Germany.
