= Großniedesheim =

- Municipality
- Coat of arms

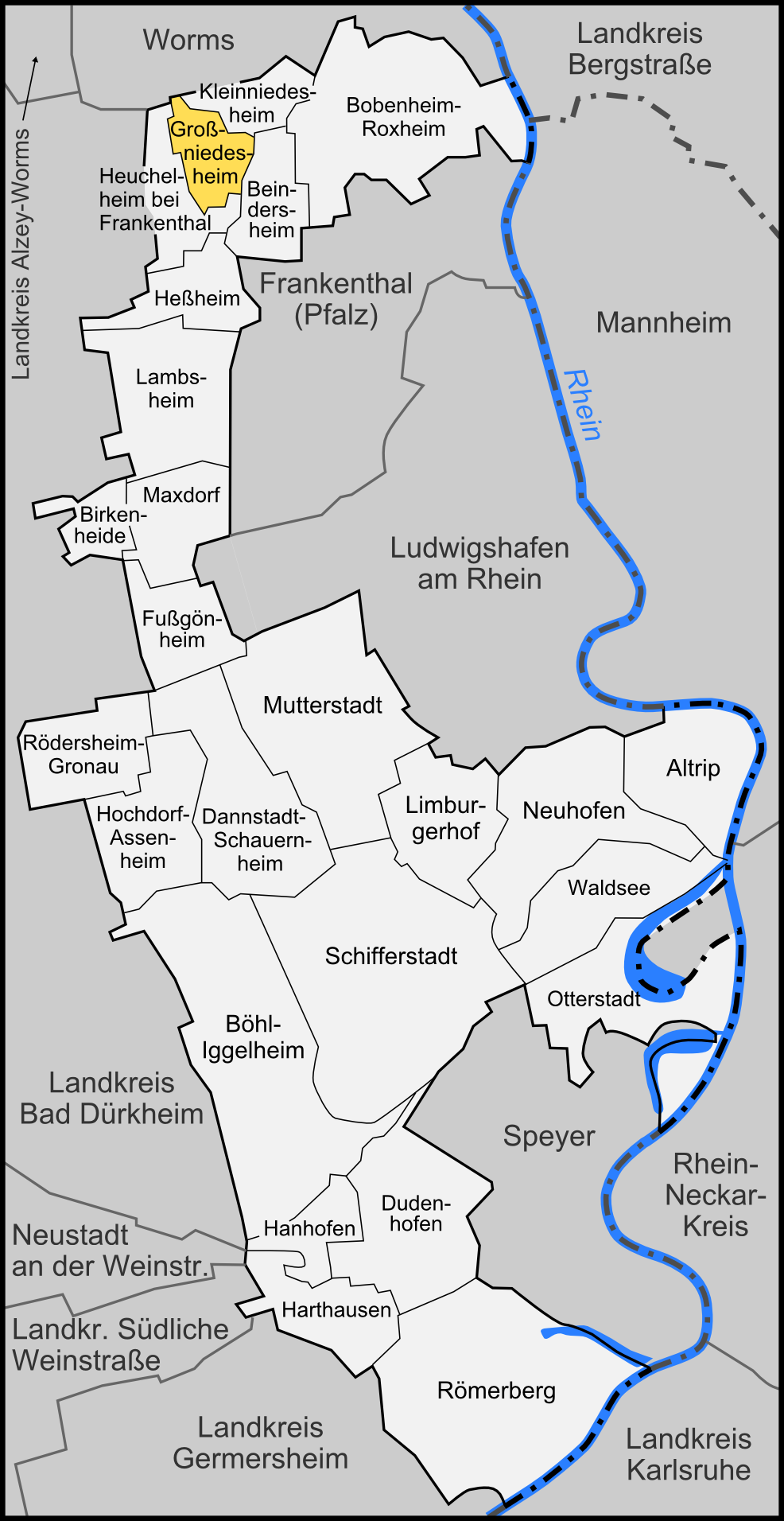
- Location of Großniedesheim within Rhein-Pfalz-Kreis district
- Interactive map of Großniedesheim
- Location within Germany Location within Rhineland-Palatinate
- Coordinates: 49°35′N 8°19′E
- Country: Germany
- State: Rhineland-Palatinate
- District: Rhein-Pfalz-Kreis
- Municipal assoc.: Lambsheim-Heßheim

Government
  - Mayor (2019–24): Michael Walther (SPD)

Area
  - Total: 3.78 km^{2} (1.46 sq mi)
- Elevation: 103 m (338 ft)

Population (2025-12-31)
  - Total: 1,392
  - Density: 368/km^{2} (954/sq mi)
- Time zone: UTC+01:00 (CET)
  - Summer (DST): UTC+02:00 (CEST)
- Postal codes: 67259
- Dialling codes: 06239
- Vehicle registration: RP
- Website: www.grossniedesheim.de

Großniedesheim (German pronunciation: [ɡʁoːsˈniːdəshaɪm], lit. 'Great Niedesheim', in contrast to "Little Niedesheim") is a municipality in the Rhein-Pfalz-Kreis, in Rhineland-Palatinate, Germany.

== Politics ==
=== Municipal Council ===
Municipal Council 2014
Party	Votes	Seats
SPD	63.8%	10
CDU	9.6%	2
FWG	26.6%	4
Voter Participation: 67.4%

=== Mayor ===
The mayor of Großniedesheim is Michael Walther (SPD).
