= Beindersheim =

- Municipality
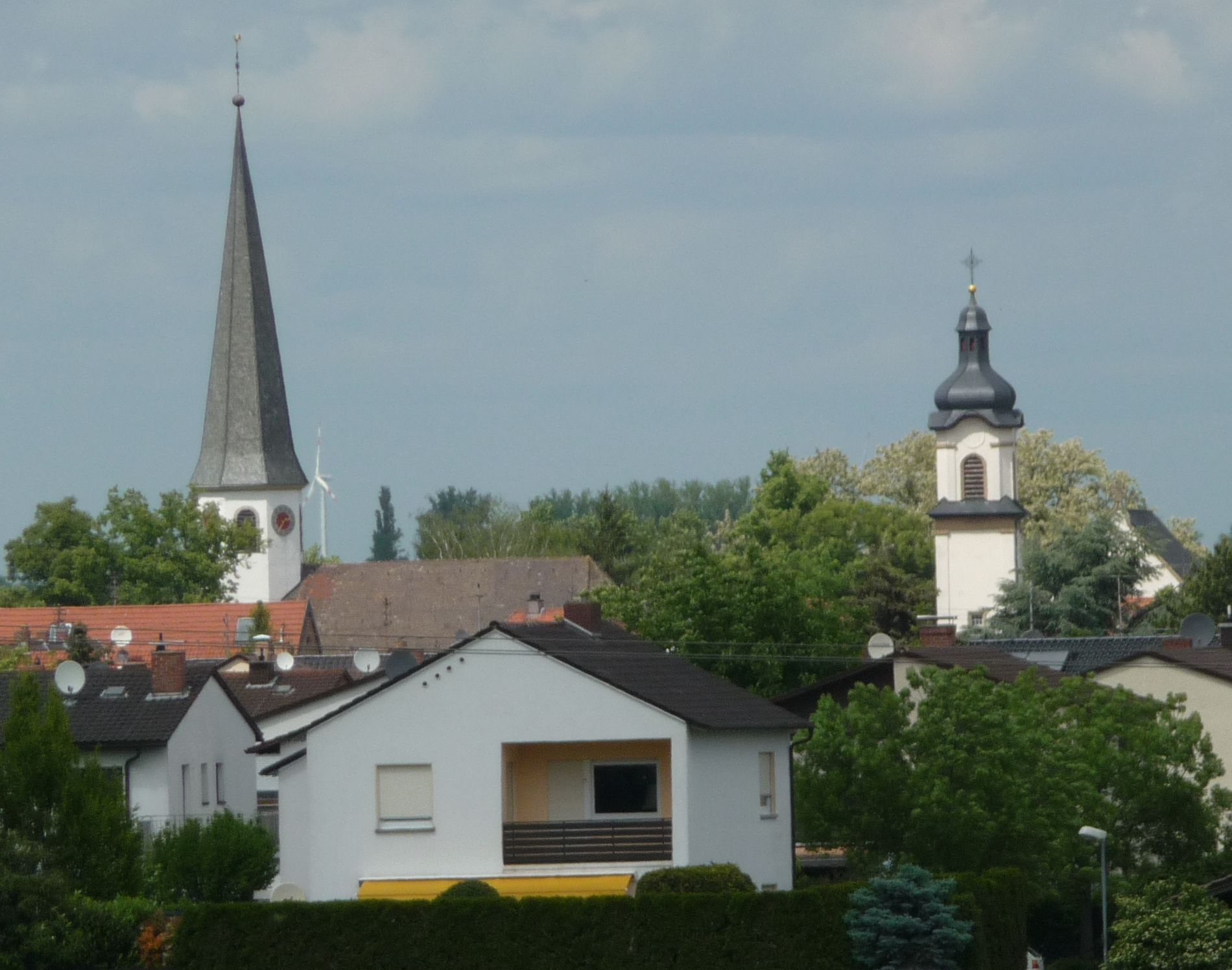

- Coat of arms

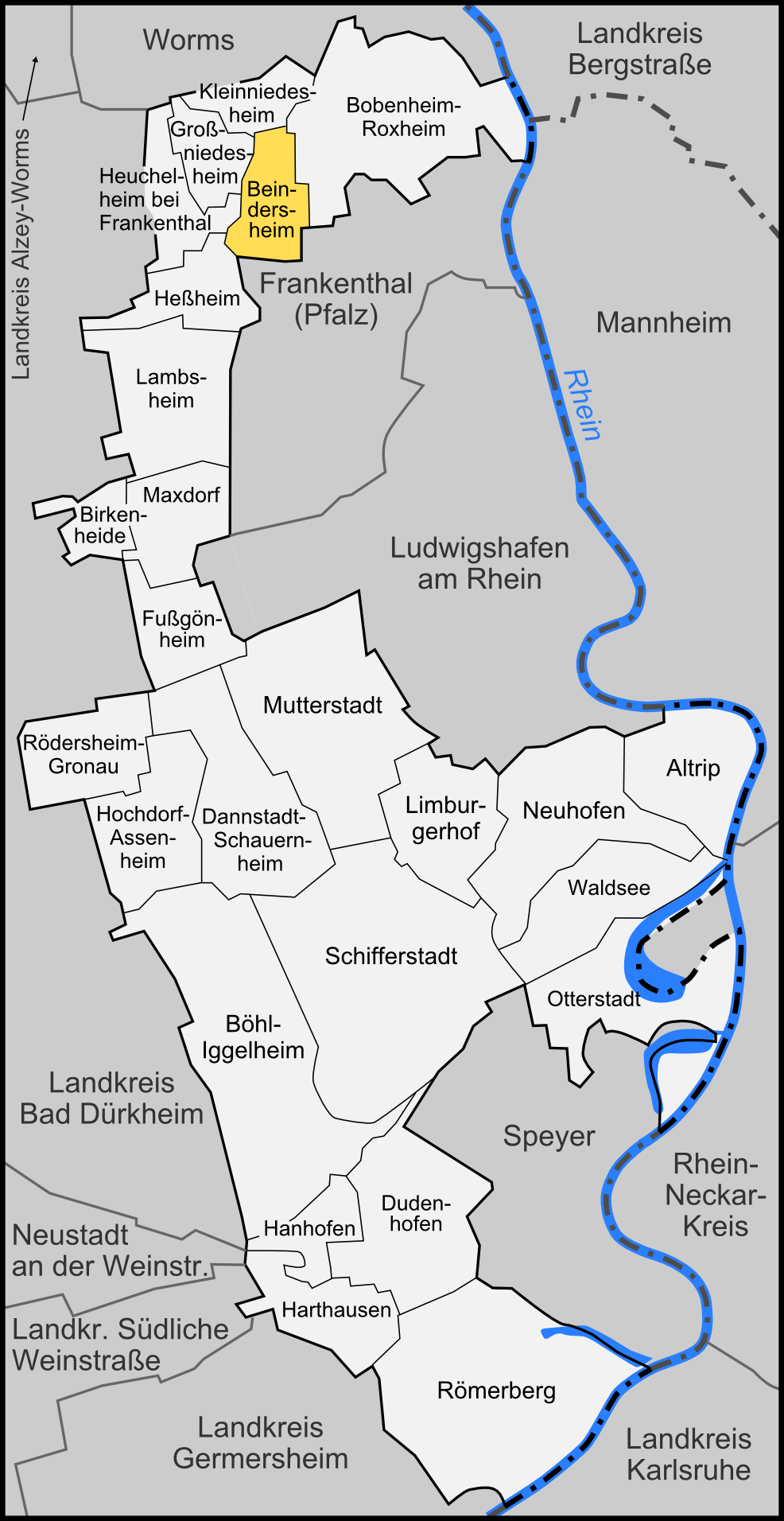
- Location of Beindersheim within Rhein-Pfalz-Kreis district
- Interactive map of Beindersheim
- Location within Germany Location within Rhineland-Palatinate
- Coordinates: 49°34′N 8°19′E
- Country: Germany
- State: Rhineland-Palatinate
- District: Rhein-Pfalz-Kreis
- Municipal assoc.: Lambsheim-Heßheim

Government
  - Mayor (2019–24): Ken Stutzmann (SPD)

Area
  - Total: 5.73 km^{2} (2.21 sq mi)
- Elevation: 95 m (312 ft)

Population (2025-12-31)
  - Total: 3,470
  - Density: 606/km^{2} (1,570/sq mi)
- Time zone: UTC+01:00 (CET)
  - Summer (DST): UTC+02:00 (CEST)
- Postal codes: 67259
- Dialling codes: 06233
- Vehicle registration: RP
- Website: www.beindersheim.de

Beindersheim (German pronunciation: [ˈbaɪndɐshaɪm]) is a municipality in the Rhein-Pfalz-Kreis, in Rhineland-Palatinate, Germany.

== Community Parts ==
Beindersheim is also home to the Wohnplätze Bentriteshof, Hubertushof, Lilienhof, Oberfeld-Hof, Peterhof and Sonnenhof.

== History ==
=== Name ===
The name "Bentritesheim" was used in the Lorsch Codex in 855. It is composed of the basic word "heim" and the word "Bentrites", derived from the Proto-Germanic name Bandarit, which is existed in the 6th century. It was also spelled as "Bentersheim".

=== Early history ===
A 7300-year-old settlement was detected by aerial photo-evaluations in 2005 of already known archaeological sites in the Gemarkung Beindersheim. [...]

Beindersheim is located on Speyer on Worms the Roman road from Speyer on the western bank of the Rhine. Foundations of the foundations of two Roman villas in the area of the Jubengewanne and Osterlanggewann are the Roman settlement in Beindersheim. In the changing history of the patrocinium is at the beginning "Holy Cross", gladly given in the Gallo-Roman time.

Probably in the pre-Franconian period, the patristic of the church community changes to "Saint Peter", especially since it is only in the following Franconian-Carolingian period of worshiping Saint Peter together with Saint Paul.

Frankish settlements were very frequent in the vicinity of Roman settlements. This is also the case in Beindersheim, which is also indicated by the characteristic name "-heim". The first documentary mention of Beindersheim of April 13, 855 in the Lorscher Codex manifests a property exchange in the district of the village of Bentritesheim in the Wormsgau. From the second documentary mention 874 in the "Mainz Declaration "Shows that between 629 and 656, a Franconian king from Bendirdisheim had surrendered his property to the Cologne Episcopal Church. From this it can be concluded that the village was founded by bandarite shortly after the Franconian occupation in the 6th century. There are no written sources for the next 400 years.

=== Middle ages ===
Under Konrad II (1024-1039), the Leiningen (Count of Leiningen) received the Landgrafschaft as Fief of the bishop of Worms.

In 1254, the patronage and decree of the Church to the Holy Cross and to Saint Peter was transferred to the knight Diezo of Enselntheim (Einselthum). Ten years later Diezo von Einselthum (who was from Leiningen) was able to sell the assurance of the Worm Bishop Eberhard the Tenrecht for 600 pounds of light to the Andreasstift in Worms. Until the French Revolution, the Andreasstift Worms is patron saint and tenherr of the church at Beindersheim. The third church patron saint is St. Nicholas, whose worship of the Cluny monastery dates from the 12th century.

A document from 1307 documents an existing village court together with apprentices in Beindersheim. In 1398, Beindersheim was one of three lemming dishes.

=== 15th to 17th centuries ===
In 1438 Count Emich von Leiningen presented the Hans Kranich of Dirmstein, called Bock, with a good of 102 1/2 acres. In 1481, Leiningen retired from the Electoral Palatinate following the death of Count Hesso Beindersheim.

In 1562 Arnold Aquila (eagle) became the first Lutheran pastor in the church. His date of entry coincides with the beginning of the confiscation of the spiritual goods, which is carried out by the administration of the Kurpfalz. In 1577, the Reformed Faith was introduced in Beindersheim, and this group became the largest religious community. Lutherans and Catholics form the minority. The Lutheran priest Hubertus Sturmius had to leave Beindersheim in 1579 and became a professor of theology at the newly founded Leiden University / Netherlands.

In the Thirty Years' War, Beindersheim has a hard time, especially since it is in the immediate vicinity of the fortified town of Frankenthal. In 1621, the Spanish army besieged Spinolas Frankenthal. In Beindersheim the supplies are plundered and buildings are set on fire. In 1632, the Swedes laid the foundations for Frankenthal and in 1635 the Spaniards took over the city. In 1644-1646 the whole of the desolation of Beindersheim by the French, which laid siege on the Frankenthal occupied by the Spaniards.

In 1654 40 Walloon faith refugees were taken in Beindersheim. In the coming years this group will grow to 200 persons. They celebrate their own worship and build a school in French. The large number of foreign residents must have led to a serious change in the cohabitation, since at the beginning also difficulties of understanding existed. In addition, the people who had been taken over had little real estate and had to make a living as day laborer and craftsman. When, on the 2nd Advent of 1688, French troops massacred Beindersheimer in the course of the Palatinate succession war, the majority of the Walloons left the village in order to secure themselves on the right side of the Rhine in the area of Hanau and Frankfurt. In October 1689 the village has only 111 inhabitants.

=== 18th century ===
On 26 August 1705, the elector of the Palatinate of Beindersheim came to the bishopric of Worms. With the new rule the remaining Catholics are in a more favorable position. The population is growing rapidly, but the suffers of the years 1784 and 1785 lead to catastrophic plight for poorer population groups, as documented by the disturbing liquidation protocols. There are departures to the surrounding area, to emigration to East and West Galicia.

In the course of the coalition war French troops came to Beindersheim in 1792. On February 2, 1794, the French requisitioned 47 pieces of cattle in the parish. The [Prussians] detach the French. On May 1, 1794, there were fights about Frankenthal, the Prussians must retreat. Several civilians flee to the right side of the Rhine.

=== 19th century ===
On 17 October 1797 Austria left the left bank of the Rhine to France. Beindersheim is part of the department of the Mont-Tonnerre (Donnersberg). 1808 condemned a special chamber of the jury court Mainz 18 Beindersheimer citizens to six years of imprisonment. They had refused to pay the high French property tax and snatched the camp-book from the taxpayer and destroyed public documents.

At the turn of the year 1813/14 Austrian and Bavarian troops liberated the left-Rhine region from the French rule. After the Vienna Congress (1815) Beindersheim became part of the Palatinate in 1816 to the Kingdom of Bavaria. In June 1849, the Bavarian military quartered 120 riders and 384 foot soldiers in Beindersheim to defend against the invasion of Baden and Palatinate. The last quartering was recorded by the philosopher Philipp Raquet in 1850.

Between 1800 and 1858, according to the housebooks of Philipp Raquet and Heinrich Schardon 235 people of Beindersheim leave the village to emigrate to America. The main settlement area of Beindersheimer was Ohio (1833).

=== Population development ===
By the end of the 17th century, Beindersheim was probably a pure one-street village on the "Schenkelstraße" / Kirchenstraße, which had about 40 farms in the early 17th century and thus 150-200 inhabitants. In the 18th century, there was continuous population growth through reconstruction and resettlement after the Pfälzische Erbfolgekrieg, so that 1771 370 inhabitants were counted. During this time the southbound connecting roads were built. The local boundaries of the 18th century were scarcely expanded in the 19th century, as the inflow was only slight in contrast to the surrounding area, and only new vacancies were closed by new citizens. There has been an expansion since the beginning of the 20th century, especially in the southeast. They were mostly residential buildings of workers and employees in Frankenthal and Ludwigshafen am Rhein. The trend from the Bauerndorf to the Wohngemeinde continued after the Second World War, the newly populated areas have more than doubled the built area. In 1960 Beindersheim had 1260 inhabitants, since then several new construction areas in the south, west and east were opened up.

== Politics ==
=== Municipal council ===
The municipal council in Beindersheim consists of 20 council members. The last election was on 25 May 2014.

Municipal Council 2014			Municipal Council 2009			Municipal Council 2004
Party	Votes	Seats	Party	Votes	Seats	Party	Votes	Seats
SPD	37.1%	8	SPD	33.1%	6	SPD	33.4 %	7
CDU	36.8 %	8	CDU	38.1%	8	CDU	37.4 %	7
FWG	16.4%	3	FWG	28.8%	6	FWG	29.1 %	6
Voter Participation: 59.4%			Voter Participation: 58.5%			Voter Participation: 71.2%

=== The mayor ===
Ken Stutzmann (SPD) was elected mayor in May 2019. His predecessor was Thomas Wey (CDU), in office since 2009.

=== Coat of arms ===
"Blasoning of the coat of arms is:" In black, a golden landmark in the form of a ring filled by a golden cross, the horizontal arms of which protrude over the ring, accompanies right by a silver sword With golden knob and left of a silver key with linkshin twisted silver beard and golden handle ".

== Culture, sights, nature ==
=== Cultural characteristics ===
- Catholic Church of the Holy Cross, St. Peter and St. Nicholas '(Kirchenstraße 9): Neubarocker Putzbau, based on Upper Bavarian models.
- The Protestant Church (Kirchenstraße 7) was built in 1748 at the same place, for which a church was already established in 874.
- Rathaus (Schenkelstraße 1): Built in 1849, until 1913 also Protestant schoolhouse and until 1950 guardhouse. A two-storey building in the center of the village, which replaces the previous building from the 17th century.
- Kirchenstraße 5 : farm, possibly former Protestant vicarage. The ground floor was built in 1747, the upper floor and the saddle roof date back to the late 19th century.
- Kirchenstraße 16 : farm from the middle 19th century.
- Schenkelstraße 4 and Schenkelstraße 5 : Landscape and location typical farms from the 19th century.
- Crossroads on Großniedesheimer Straße: Built in 1869, recently restored.
- In the Hofmauer of the new building Schenkelstraße 14 the former Schlussstein of the 1774 in this place erected Zehntscheune.
- Kriegerdenkmal in the cemetery, 1959 by Freinsheimer sculptor Franz Lind created concrete sculpture.
- Tomb Diehl / Raquet in the cemetery, built around 1910, polished marble base with angel figure.

See also: List of cultural monuments in Beindersheim

=== Other structures ===
- Former (Brunnenweg 6): Two-storey plaster building from 1913 with large rectangular windows, high hipped roofs with curved dormers. The building is now used as a library. The former Lehrerwohnhaus (Frankenthaler Straße 27/29), also built in 1913, is also adjacent.
- Frankenthaler Straße 10 : Homestead from the 19th / 20th century. Century with a two-storey plastered building as a residential and an adjoining house. It was destroyed by a fire and then demolished.<! - == Economy and infrastructure == ->

=== Other facilities ===
- In the Schlittweg is the Albrecht Dürer - Grundschule 'with about 200 pupils from Beindersheim and Heuchelheim.
- The volunteer fire service is stationed at the western entrance. It is one of the five fire brigades in the Association town of Lambsheim-Heßheim and currently consists of 23 firefighters, who manage their operations with two vehicles.
- In the middle of the town, next to the primary school is the Protestant nursery school 'Ark Noah' ' ".

=== Nature ===
- The tree plant on the Protestant church and the area of the old cemetery behind this church belong to the listed natural monument.
- The Schrakelbach, a branch of the Eckbach s, was renamed to the north of the village.
- East of the village a biotope was built from an old gravel pit. See also: List of natural monuments in Beindersheim

== Personalities ==
=== Sons and daughters of the church ===
- Paul Gross (1883-1942), Bavarian officer, then shareholder and managing director of the Frankfurter Strohhutfabrik AG, deported to Lodz in 1941 and murdered there.
- Brigitte Reinwald (* January 13, 1958), Professor of African History at the University of Hanover.
- Emil Schardon (1887-1950), was a medical doctor and because of his bravery in the practice of the medical profession Knight of the Bavarian Military Medical Order.

=== People who have worked on the ground ===
- Rainer Hauck (born 16 January 1978) Bundesliga footballer, played in youth at the MTSV Beindersheim.
- Hubertus Sturmius (born 16th century) was a reformed pastor in Beindersheim and from 1579 theological professor at Leiden University, the Netherlands.
- Erwin Wortelkamp (born September 21, 1938) Sculptor and painter, founder and leader (until 1973) of the "ntel 8" in the Neuer Weg in Beindersheim.

== Clubs ==
- Men's Gymnastics and Sports Club Beindersheim 1909 e. V. - active association with 500 members
