= Dannstadt-Schauernheim =

- Municipality
- Coat of arms

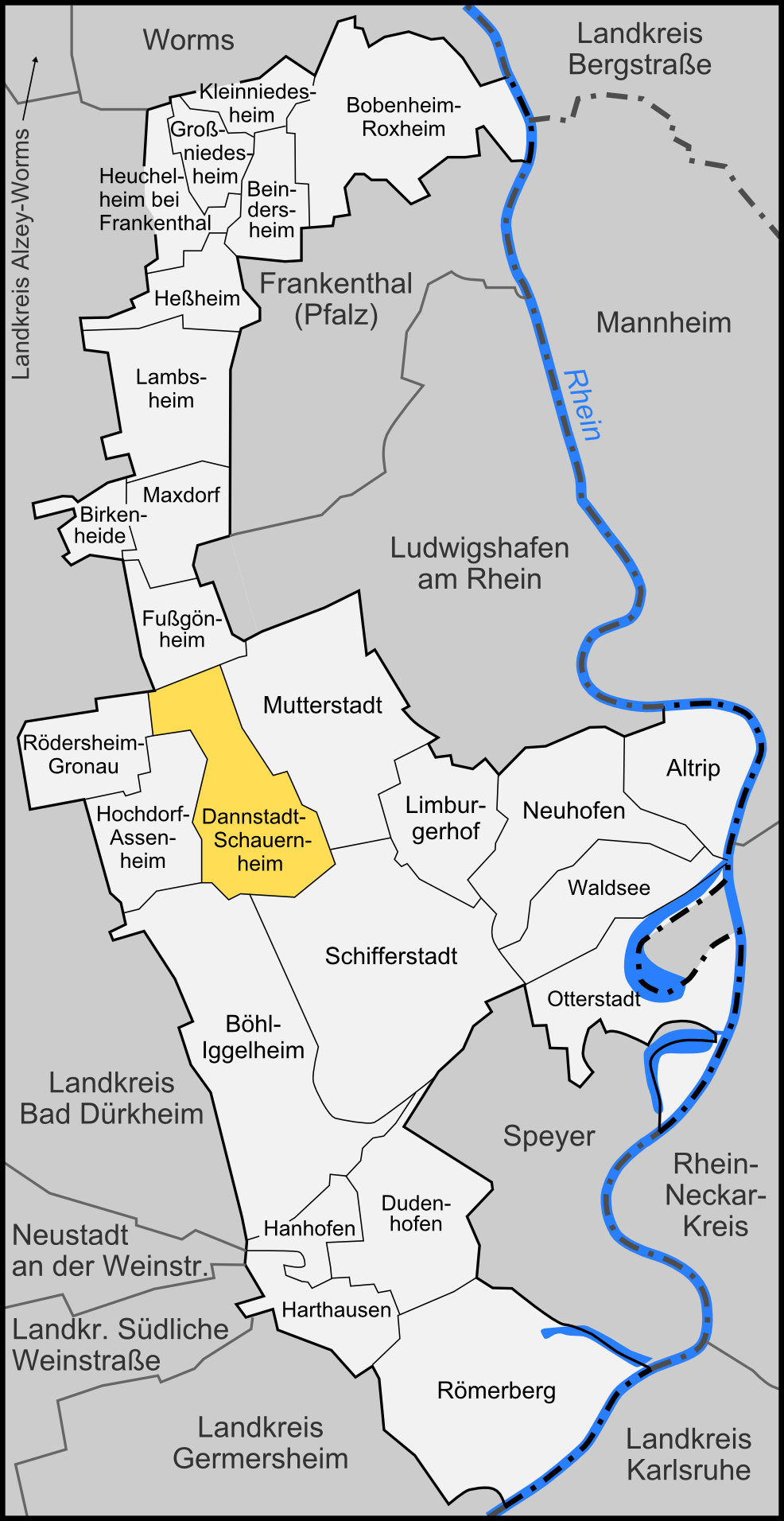
- Location of Dannstadt-Schauernheim within Rhein-Pfalz-Kreis district
- Interactive map of Dannstadt-Schauernheim
- Location within Germany Location within Rhineland-Palatinate
- Coordinates: 49°25′41″N 8°18′58″E
- Country: Germany
- State: Rhineland-Palatinate
- District: Rhein-Pfalz-Kreis
- Municipal assoc.: Dannstadt-Schauernheim

Government
  - Mayor (2019–24): Manuela Winkelmann (CDU)

Area
  - Total: 15.24 km^{2} (5.88 sq mi)
- Elevation: 103 m (338 ft)

Population (2025-12-31)
  - Total: 7,460
  - Density: 490/km^{2} (1,270/sq mi)
- Time zone: UTC+01:00 (CET)
  - Summer (DST): UTC+02:00 (CEST)
- Postal codes: 67125
- Dialling codes: 06231
- Vehicle registration: RP
- Website: https://www.vg-dannstadt-schauernheim.de

Dannstadt-Schauernheim (German pronunciation: [ˈdanʃtat ˈʃaʊɐnhaɪm]) is a municipality in the Rhein-Pfalz-Kreis, in Rhineland-Palatinate, Germany.

It is situated approximately 11 km southwest of Ludwigshafen.

Dannstadt-Schauernheim is the seat of the Verbandsgemeinde ("collective municipality") Dannstadt-Schauernheim.
