= Lambsheim =

- Municipality
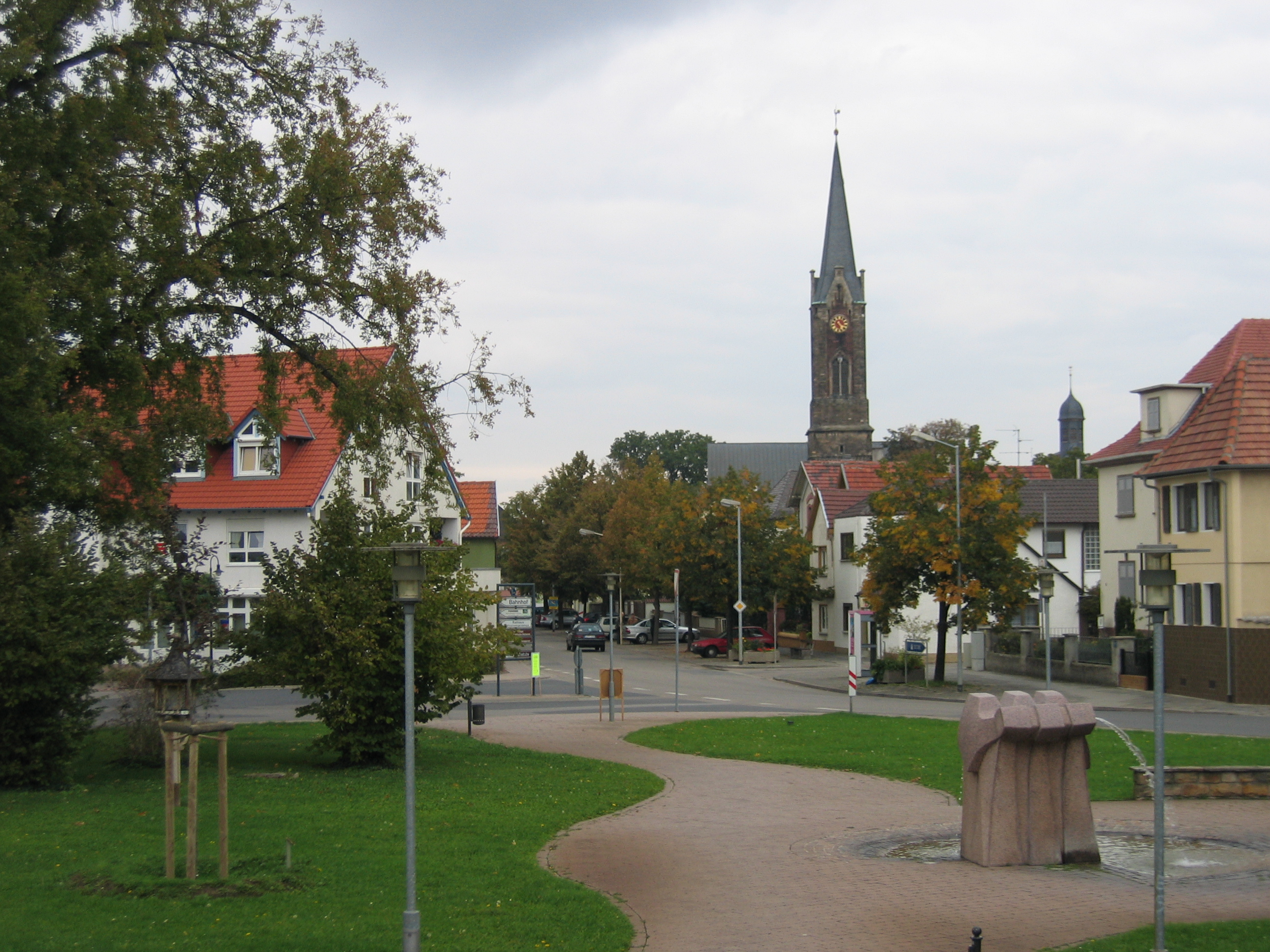

- Coat of arms

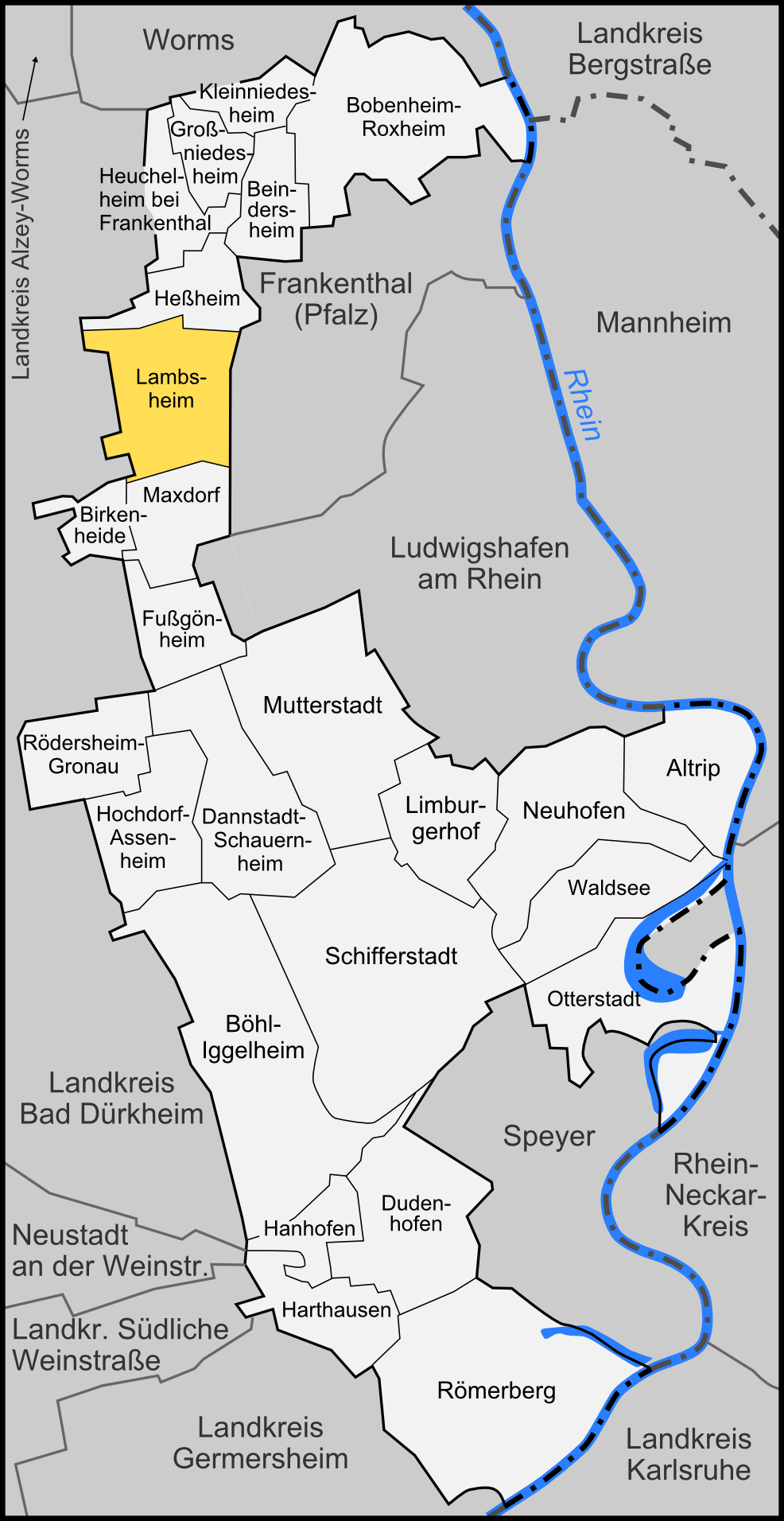
- Location of Lambsheim within Rhein-Pfalz-Kreis district
- Interactive map of Lambsheim
- Location within Germany Location within Rhineland-Palatinate
- Coordinates: 49°30′48″N 8°17′15″E
- Country: Germany
- State: Rhineland-Palatinate
- District: Rhein-Pfalz-Kreis
- Municipal assoc.: Lambsheim-Heßheim

Government
  - Mayor (2019–24): Herbert Knoll

Area
  - Total: 12.75 km^{2} (4.92 sq mi)
- Elevation: 95–98 m (312–322 ft)

Population (2025-12-31)
  - Total: 6,863
  - Density: 538.3/km^{2} (1,394/sq mi)
- Time zone: UTC+01:00 (CET)
  - Summer (DST): UTC+02:00 (CEST)
- Postal codes: 67245
- Dialling codes: 06233
- Vehicle registration: RP
- Website: www.lambsheim.de

Lambsheim (German pronunciation: [ˈlampshaɪm]) is a municipality in the Rhein-Pfalz-Kreis, in Rhineland-Palatinate, Germany. It is the seat of the Verbandsgemeinde Lambsheim-Heßheim.

== Geography ==
Lambsheim is situated approximately 6 km southwest of Frankenthal, and 11 km northwest of Ludwigshafen.

== History ==
Lambsheim was first mentioned as Lammundisheim in the Lorsch codex in 768.

== Politics ==
=== Municipal Council ===
Municipal Council 1999			Municipal Council 2004			Municipal Council 2009			Municipal Council 2014		
Party	Votes	Seats	Party	Votes	Seats	Party	Votes	Seats	Party	Votes	Seats
CDU	36.8 %	8	CDU	35.3 %	8	CDU	29.5 %	6	CDU	40.8 %	9
SPD	33.1 %	8	SPD	25.5 %	6	SPD	34.5 %	8	SPD	37.1 %	8
FDP	5.8 %	1	FDP	10.6 %	2	FDP	11.7 %	3	FDP	7.3 %	2
Greens	5.5 %	1	Greens	8.3 %	2	Greens	10.7 %	2	Greens	14.8 %	3
Independent (FWG)	18.7 %	4	Independent (FWG)	20.3 %	4	Independent (FWG)	13.6 %	3	Independent (FWG)	-	-
Voter Participation: 68.6%			Voter Participation: 61.3%			Voter Participation: 57.2%			Voter Participation: 59.4%		

=== Mayor ===
The mayor of Lambsheim is Barbara Eisenbarth-Wahl.

=== Sister cities ===
- Saint-Georges-sur-Baulche, France, since 1981

== Economy and Infrastructure ==
=== Wineries ===
In Lambsheim there are 3 wineries.

== Notable people ==
- Jürgen Kohler (born 1965), a World-Cup-winning footballer, was born in Lambsheim.
