= Rödersheim-Gronau =

- Municipality
- Coat of arms

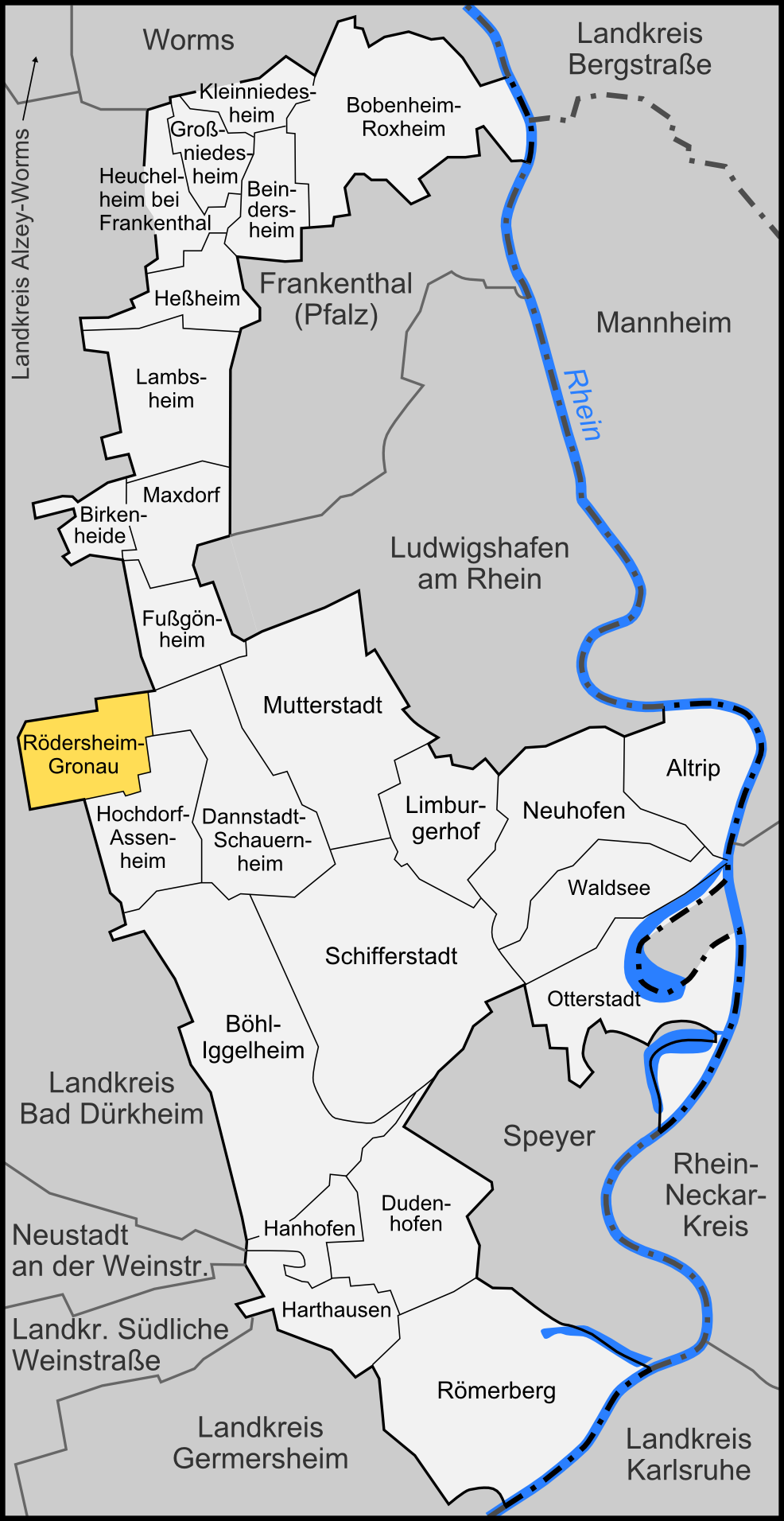
- Location of Rödersheim-Gronau within Rhein-Pfalz-Kreis district
- Interactive map of Rödersheim-Gronau
- Location within Germany Location within Rhineland-Palatinate
- Coordinates: 49°26′N 8°16′E
- Country: Germany
- State: Rhineland-Palatinate
- District: Rhein-Pfalz-Kreis

Government
  - Mayor (2019–24): Thomas Angel

Area
  - Total: 8.24 km^{2} (3.18 sq mi)
- Elevation: 105 m (344 ft)

Population (2025-12-31)
  - Total: 2,946
  - Density: 358/km^{2} (926/sq mi)
- Time zone: UTC+01:00 (CET)
  - Summer (DST): UTC+02:00 (CEST)
- Postal codes: 67127
- Dialling codes: 06231
- Vehicle registration: RP
- Website: www.roedersheim-gronau.de

Rödersheim-Gronau (German pronunciation: [ˈʁøːdɐshaɪm ˈɡʁoːnaʊ]) is a municipality in the Rhein-Pfalz-Kreis district of Rhineland-Palatinate, Germany.
