= Rhein-Pfalz-Kreis =

Coordinates: 49°25′N 8°20′E

- District
- Flag Coat of arms
- Country: Germany
- State: Rhineland-Palatinate
- Capital: Ludwigshafen

Government
  - District admin.: Volker Knörr (CDU)

Area
  - Total: 304.88 km^{2} (117.71 sq mi)

Population (31 December 2024)
  - Total: 156,346
  - Density: 512.81/km^{2} (1,328.2/sq mi)
- Time zone: UTC+01:00 (CET)
  - Summer (DST): UTC+02:00 (CEST)
- Vehicle registration: RP
- Website: rhein-pfalz-kreis.de

The Rhein-Pfalz-Kreis (German: [ʁaɪnˈpfaltsˌkʁaɪs]) is a district (Kreis) in the east of Rhineland-Palatinate, Germany.

Neighboring districts are (from north clockwise) the district-free city Worms, the district Bergstraße, district-free Mannheim, Frankenthal and Ludwigshafen, Rhein-Neckar, district-free Speyer, the districts Karlsruhe, Germersheim, Südliche Weinstraße and Bad Dürkheim.

== History ==
The district was created in 1886 under the name Bezirksamt Ludwigshafen, one of the last acts of king Ludwig II of Bavaria. The population in the area around Speyer had grown significantly, which made the splitting of the Bezirksamt Speyer necessary. In 1969, the Speyer and Ludwigshafen districts and parts of the Frankenthal and Neustadt districts were merged again to form the new Ludwigshafen district.

On 19 May 2003 the district parliament passed a resolution to rename the district "Rhein-Pfalz-Kreis" starting in 2004.

== Partnerships ==
The district started its first partnership in 1964 with the municipalities Schnals and Naturns in Italy. The Speyer district had a partnership with Schlanders and Martell, also in Italy, which were taken over after the merging of the district. As part of the partnership of Rhineland-Palatinate with Rwanda the district has a partnership with the municipality of Kinyami starting in 1983. After the German reunification the district supported the Saalkreis in Saxony-Anhalt in modernising the administration to western standard, which resulted in a friendship between the two districts. In 1991 a partnership with the district Radviliskis in Lithuania was started, and in 2002 with the Polish district Opole in Silesia.

== Geography ==
The district is located in the valley of the Rhine river, both the actual river valley and the Vorderpfälzer Tiefland, formed by the sediments of the rivers of the Palatinate hills. The district has a very warm climate, together with the fertile loess soil it makes the area favourable for growing vegetable. However the rainfall is comparatively low, thus irrigation is needed.

== Coat of arms ==
The wavy line from the bottom-right to the top-left symbolizes the Rhine river.

The lion in the left is the lion of the Electorate of the Palatinate, to which the largest part of the district belonged historically.

The silver cross in the right part is taken from the State of Speyer, taken from the coat of arms of the Speyer district.

The shield in the middle show water lily leaves, a typical symbol for the district, as this plant grows in the old arms of the Rhine river.

== Towns and municipalities ==
=== Verband-free municipalities ===
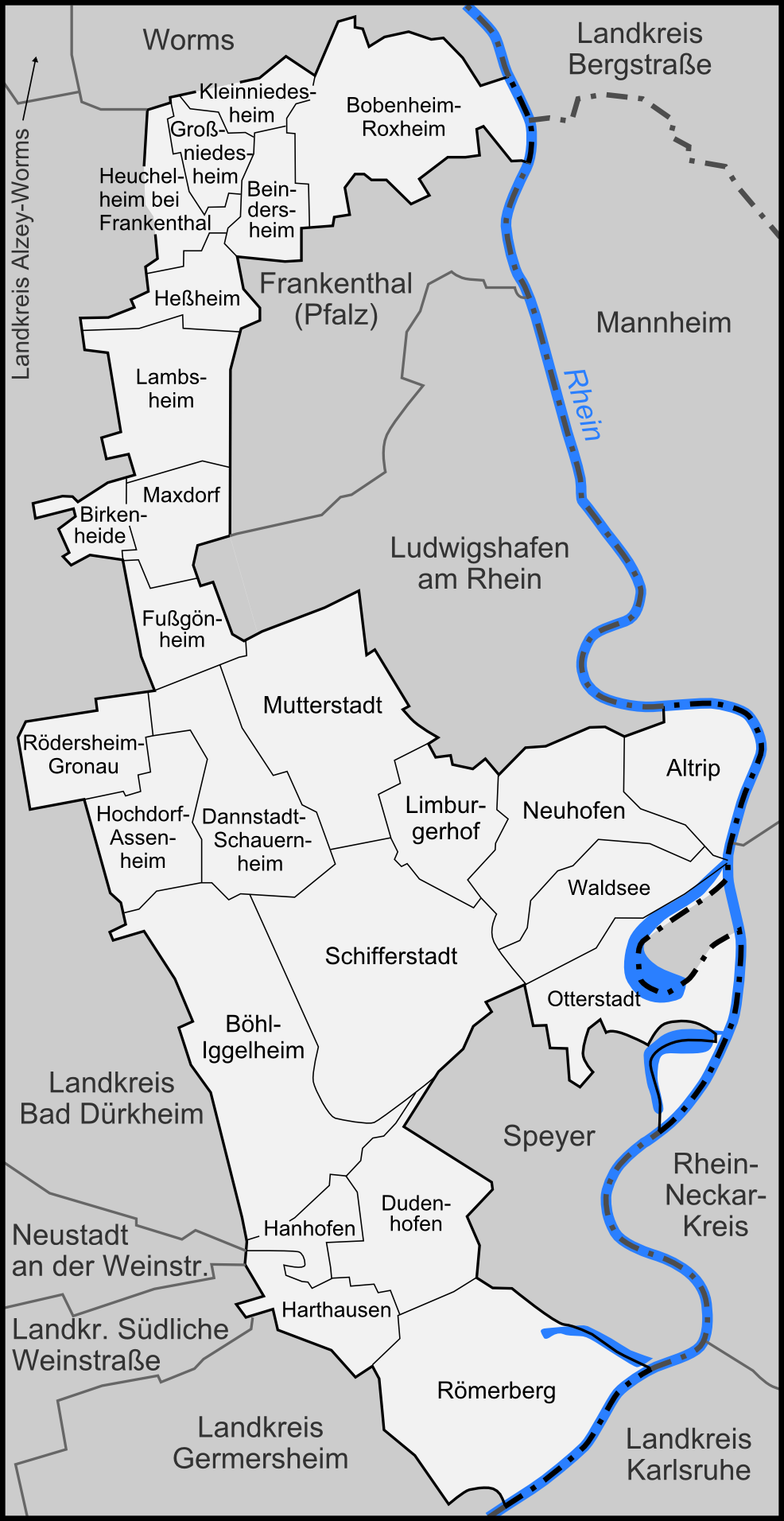
Clickable map of towns and municipalities in the district

Bobenheim-Roxheim	9 967 inhabitants	20.5 km^{2}
Böhl-Iggelheim	10 533 inhabitants	32.8 km^{2}
Limburgerhof	10 834 inhabitants	9 km^{2}
Mutterstadt	12 576 inhabitants	20.5 km^{2}
Stadt Schifferstadt	19 392 inhabitants	28 km^{2}

=== Verbandsgemeinden ===
Verbandsgemeinde; Dannstadt- Schauernheim		13 022 inhabitants	33.2 km^{2}
	Dannstadt- Schauernheim *	7 033 inhabitants	15.3 km^{2}
	Hochdorf- Assenheim	3 113 inhabitants	9.7 km^{2}
	Rödersheim- Gronau	2 876 inhabitants	8.2 km^{2}
Verbandsgemeinde; Lambsheim-Heßheim		15 987 inhabitants	37.68 km^{2}
	Beindersheim	3 054 inhabitants	5.7 km^{2}
	Großniedesheim	1 391 inhabitants	3.8 km^{2}
	Heßheim	3 060 inhabitants	5.8 km^{2}
	Heuchelheim bei Frankenthal	1 272 inhabitants	5.8 km^{2}
	Kleinniedesheim	942 inhabitants	3.9 km^{2}
	Lambsheim *	6 268 inhabitants	12.8 km^{2}
Verbandsgemeinde; Maxdorf		12 687 inhabitants	16.9 km^{2}
	Birkenheide	3 192 inhabitants	2.9 km^{2}
	Fußgönheim	2 484 inhabitants	6.7 km^{2}
	Maxdorf *	7 011 inhabitants	7.4 km^{2}
Verbandsgemeinde; Rheinauen		23 706 inhabitants	51.28 km^{2}
	Altrip	7 808 inhabitants	10.5 km^{2}
	Neuhofen	7 207 inhabitants	12.3 km^{2}
	Otterstadt	3 361 inhabitants	15.6 km^{2}
	Waldsee *	5 330 inhabitants	12.9 km^{2}
Verbandsgemeinde; Römerberg-Dudenhofen		20 498 inhabitants	54.98 km^{2}
	Dudenhofen *	5.812 inhabitants	13 km^{2}
	Hanhofen	2 410 inhabitants	5.8 km^{2}
	Harthausen	3 082 inhabitants	8.4 km^{2}
	Römerberg	9 194 inhabitants	27.9 km^{2}

^{*}seat of the Verbandsgemeinde
