= Neustadt – Speyer =

Federal electoral district of Germany

207 Neustadt – Speyer
- Electoral district for the Bundestag
- Neustadt – Speyer in 2025
- State: Rhineland-Palatinate
- Population: 287,900 (2019)
- Electorate: 217,120 (2025)
- Major settlements: Neustadt an der Weinstraße; Speyer; Schifferstadt
- Area: 866.1 km^{2}

Current electoral district
- Created: 1965
- Party: CDU
- Member: Johannes Steiniger
- Elected: 2017, 2021, 2025

Neustadt – Speyer is an electoral constituency (German: Wahlkreis) represented in the Bundestag. It elects one member via first-past-the-post voting. Under the current constituency numbering system, it is designated as constituency 207. It is located in southeastern Rhineland-Palatinate, comprising the cities of Neustadt an der Weinstraße and Speyer, the district of Bad Dürkheim, and the southern part of the Rhein-Pfalz-Kreis district.

Neustadt – Speyer was created for the 1965 federal election. Since 2017, it has been represented by Johannes Steiniger of the Christian Democratic Union (CDU).

== Geography ==
Neustadt – Speyer is located in southeastern Rhineland-Palatinate. As of the 2021 federal election, it comprises the independent cities of Neustadt an der Weinstraße and Speyer, the district of Bad Dürkheim, and the municipalities of Schifferstadt, Otterstadt, and Waldsee and the Verbandsgemeinde of Römerberg-Dudenhofen from the Rhein-Pfalz-Kreis district.

== History ==
Neustadt – Speyer was created in 1965. In the 1965 through 1976 elections, it was constituency 160 in the numbering system. In the 1980 through 1998 elections, it was number 158. In the 2002 election, it was number 211. In the 2005 election, it was number 210. In the 2009 and 2013 elections, it was number 209. In the 2017 and 2021 elections, it was number 208. From the 2025 election, it has been number 207.

Originally, the constituency comprised the cities of Neustadt an der Weinstraße and Speyer and the districts of Landkreis Neustadt an der Weinstraße and Landkreis Speyer. In the 1972 through 1998 elections, it comprised the cities of Neustadt an der Weinstraße and Speyer, the municipalities of Bad Dürkheim and Haßloch and the Verbandsgemeinden of Deidesheim, Freinsheim, Lambrecht (Pfalz), and Wachenheim from the Bad Dürkheim district, and the municipalities of Römerberg and Schifferstadt and the Verbandsgemeinden of Dudenhofen and Rheinauen from the Landkreis Ludwigshafen district. It acquired its current borders in the 2002 election.

Election	No.	Name	Borders
1965	160	Neustadt – Speyer	Neustadt an der Weinstraße city; Speyer city; Landkreis Neustadt an der Weinstraße district; Landkreis Speyer district
1969	160	Neustadt – Speyer	Neustadt an der Weinstraße city; Speyer city; Landkreis Neustadt an der Weinstraße district; Landkreis Speyer district
1972	160	Neustadt – Speyer	Neustadt an der Weinstraße city; Speyer city; Bad Dürkheim district (only Bad Dürkheim and Haßloch municipalities and Deidesheim, Freinsheim, Lambrecht, and Wachenheim Verbandsgemeinden); Landkreis Ludwigshafen district (only Römerberg and Schifferstadt municipalities and Dudenhofen and Rheinauen Verbandsgemeinden)
1976	160	Neustadt – Speyer	Neustadt an der Weinstraße city; Speyer city; Bad Dürkheim district (only Bad Dürkheim and Haßloch municipalities and Deidesheim, Freinsheim, Lambrecht, and Wachenheim Verbandsgemeinden); Landkreis Ludwigshafen district (only Römerberg and Schifferstadt municipalities and Dudenhofen and Rheinauen Verbandsgemeinden)
1980	158	Neustadt – Speyer	Neustadt an der Weinstraße city; Speyer city; Bad Dürkheim district (only Bad Dürkheim and Haßloch municipalities and Deidesheim, Freinsheim, Lambrecht, and Wachenheim Verbandsgemeinden); Landkreis Ludwigshafen district (only Römerberg and Schifferstadt municipalities and Dudenhofen and Rheinauen Verbandsgemeinden)
1983	158	Neustadt – Speyer	Neustadt an der Weinstraße city; Speyer city; Bad Dürkheim district (only Bad Dürkheim and Haßloch municipalities and Deidesheim, Freinsheim, Lambrecht, and Wachenheim Verbandsgemeinden); Landkreis Ludwigshafen district (only Römerberg and Schifferstadt municipalities and Dudenhofen and Rheinauen Verbandsgemeinden)
1987	158	Neustadt – Speyer	Neustadt an der Weinstraße city; Speyer city; Bad Dürkheim district (only Bad Dürkheim and Haßloch municipalities and Deidesheim, Freinsheim, Lambrecht, and Wachenheim Verbandsgemeinden); Landkreis Ludwigshafen district (only Römerberg and Schifferstadt municipalities and Dudenhofen and Rheinauen Verbandsgemeinden)
1990	158	Neustadt – Speyer	Neustadt an der Weinstraße city; Speyer city; Bad Dürkheim district (only Bad Dürkheim and Haßloch municipalities and Deidesheim, Freinsheim, Lambrecht, and Wachenheim Verbandsgemeinden); Landkreis Ludwigshafen district (only Römerberg and Schifferstadt municipalities and Dudenhofen and Rheinauen Verbandsgemeinden)
1994	158	Neustadt – Speyer	Neustadt an der Weinstraße city; Speyer city; Bad Dürkheim district (only Bad Dürkheim and Haßloch municipalities and Deidesheim, Freinsheim, Lambrecht, and Wachenheim Verbandsgemeinden); Landkreis Ludwigshafen district (only Römerberg and Schifferstadt municipalities and Dudenhofen and Rheinauen Verbandsgemeinden)
1998	158	Neustadt – Speyer	Neustadt an der Weinstraße city; Speyer city; Bad Dürkheim district (only Bad Dürkheim and Haßloch municipalities and Deidesheim, Freinsheim, Lambrecht, and Wachenheim Verbandsgemeinden); Landkreis Ludwigshafen district (only Römerberg and Schifferstadt municipalities and Dudenhofen and Rheinauen Verbandsgemeinden)
2002	211	Neustadt – Speyer	Neustadt an der Weinstraße city; Speyer city; Bad Dürkheim; Rhein-Pfalz-Kreis district (only Schifferstadt municipality and Römerberg-Dudenhofen and Rheinauen (only Otterstadt and Waldsee municipalities) Verbandsgemeinden)
2005	210	Neustadt – Speyer	Neustadt an der Weinstraße city; Speyer city; Bad Dürkheim; Rhein-Pfalz-Kreis district (only Schifferstadt municipality and Römerberg-Dudenhofen and Rheinauen (only Otterstadt and Waldsee municipalities) Verbandsgemeinden)
2009	209	Neustadt – Speyer	Neustadt an der Weinstraße city; Speyer city; Bad Dürkheim; Rhein-Pfalz-Kreis district (only Schifferstadt municipality and Römerberg-Dudenhofen and Rheinauen (only Otterstadt and Waldsee municipalities) Verbandsgemeinden)
2013	209	Neustadt – Speyer	Neustadt an der Weinstraße city; Speyer city; Bad Dürkheim; Rhein-Pfalz-Kreis district (only Schifferstadt municipality and Römerberg-Dudenhofen and Rheinauen (only Otterstadt and Waldsee municipalities) Verbandsgemeinden)
2017	208	Neustadt – Speyer	Neustadt an der Weinstraße city; Speyer city; Bad Dürkheim; Rhein-Pfalz-Kreis district (only Schifferstadt municipality and Römerberg-Dudenhofen and Rheinauen (only Otterstadt and Waldsee municipalities) Verbandsgemeinden)
2021	208	Neustadt – Speyer	Neustadt an der Weinstraße city; Speyer city; Bad Dürkheim; Rhein-Pfalz-Kreis district (only Schifferstadt municipality and Römerberg-Dudenhofen and Rheinauen (only Otterstadt and Waldsee municipalities) Verbandsgemeinden)
2025	207	Neustadt – Speyer	Neustadt an der Weinstraße city; Speyer city; Bad Dürkheim; Rhein-Pfalz-Kreis district (only Schifferstadt municipality and Römerberg-Dudenhofen and Rheinauen (only Otterstadt and Waldsee municipalities) Verbandsgemeinden)

== Members ==
The constituency has been held by the Christian Democratic Union (CDU) during all but one Bundestag term since its creation. It was first represented by Bernhard Vogel from 1965 to 1969, followed by Georg Gölter until 1972. Peter Büchner of the Social Democratic Party (SPD) was elected in 1972 and served a single term. Former member Gölter regained the constituency in 1976. He was succeeded by Theo Magin in 1980, who served until 1994. Norbert Schindler was representative from 1994 to 2017. Johannes Steiniger was elected in 2017 and re-elected in 2021 and 2025.

Election	Member	Party	%
1965	Bernhard Vogel	CDU	48.1
1969	Georg Gölter	CDU	48.0
1972	Peter Büchner	SPD	47.8
1976	Georg Gölter	CDU	50.6
1980	Theo Magin	CDU	46.6
1983	Theo Magin	CDU	53.0
1987	Theo Magin	CDU	49.5
1990	Theo Magin	CDU	48.6
1994	Norbert Schindler	CDU	49.8
1998	Norbert Schindler	CDU	46.3
2002	Norbert Schindler	CDU	44.2
2005	Norbert Schindler	CDU	44.8
2009	Norbert Schindler	CDU	44.6
2013	Norbert Schindler	CDU	47.9
2017	Johannes Steiniger	CDU	40.0
2021	Johannes Steiniger	CDU	30.2
2025	Johannes Steiniger	CDU	34.7

== Election results ==
=== 2025 election ===
Federal election (2025): Neustadt – Speyer
Notes:	Blue background denotes the winner of the electorate vote. Pink background denotes a candidate elected from their party list. Yellow background denotes an electorate win by a list member, or other incumbent. A ✓ or ✗ denotes status of any incumbent, win or lose respectively.						
Party	Candidate	Votes	%	±%	Party votes	%	±%
CDU	✓ Johannes Steiniger	62,618	34.7	▲4.5	54,948	30.4	▲6.4
AfD	Thomas Stephan	35,239	19.5	▲9.5	36,881	20.4	▲10.2
SPD	Isabel Mackensen-Geis	39,588	21.9	▼6.1	32,815	18.1	▼9.2
Greens	Misbah Khan	16,908	9.4	▼2.8	21,329	11.8	▼2.1
Left	David Koch	7,117	3.9	▲1.3	10,071	5.6	▲2.7
FDP	Biance Hofmann	5,580	3.1	▼5.4	8,796	4.9	▼7.8
BSW	Fritz Weilacher	5,540	3.1	New	7,376	4.1	New
FW	Michael Priwe	4,902	2.7	▼2.9	3,506	1.9	▼1.8
Tierschutzpartei					2,260	1.2	▼0.2
Volt	Sascha Ruffer	2,507	1.4	▲0.7	1,657	0.9	▲0.4
PARTEI					717	0.4	▼0.3
BD	Elke Hirt-Neumann	472	0.3	New	325	0.2	New
ÖDP					221	0.1	▼0.1
MLPD					28	<0.1	0.0
Informal votes		1,700			1,241		
Total valid votes		180,471			180,930		
Turnout		182,171	83.9	▲4.7			
CDU hold	Majority	23,030	12.8	▲10.7			

=== 2021 election ===
Federal election (2021): Neustadt – Speyer
Notes:	Blue background denotes the winner of the electorate vote. Pink background denotes a candidate elected from their party list. Yellow background denotes an electorate win by a list member, or other incumbent. A ✓ or ✗ denotes status of any incumbent, win or lose respectively.						
Party	Candidate	Votes	%	±%	Party votes	%	±%
CDU	✓ Johannes Steiniger	51,770	30.2	▼9.8	41,322	24.0	▼11.2
SPD	Isabel Mackensen-Geis	48,158	28.1	▲2.7	47,121	27.3	▲5.6
Greens	Hannah Heller	20,869	12.2	▲4.6	23,949	13.9	▲5.1
AfD	Thomas Stephan	17,204	10.0	▼1.8	17,499	10.2	▼2.5
FDP	Bianca Hofmann	14,624	8.5	▲1.8	21,823	12.7	▲1.6
FW	Stefan Krumm-Dudenhausen	9,698	5.6	▲2.2	6,380	3.7	▲1.6
Left	Stefan Huber-Aydemir	4,535	2.6	▼2.1	4,880	2.8	▼3.2
Tierschutzpartei					2,576	1.5	
dieBasis	Jürgen Schwerdt	2,722	1.6		2,413	1.4	
PARTEI					1,232	0.7	▼0.2
Volt	Sebastian Sklubal	1,268	0.7		937	0.5	
Independent	Jonas Wittner	802	0.5				
Pirates					577	0.3	▼0.1
Team Todenhöfer					512	0.3	
ÖDP					324	0.2	0.0
V-Partei3					182	0.1	▼0.2
Humanists					178	0.1	
NPD					177	0.1	▼0.2
DiB					152	0.1	
LKR					62	0.0	
MLPD					26	0.0	0.0
Informal votes		2,178			1,506		
Total valid votes		171,650			172,322		
Turnout		173,828	79.2	▼0.8			
CDU hold	Majority	3,612	2.1	▼12.5			

=== 2017 election ===
Federal election (2017): Neustadt – Speyer
Notes:	Blue background denotes the winner of the electorate vote. Pink background denotes a candidate elected from their party list. Yellow background denotes an electorate win by a list member, or other incumbent. A ✓ or ✗ denotes status of any incumbent, win or lose respectively.						
Party	Candidate	Votes	%	±%	Party votes	%	±%
CDU	Johannes Steiniger	69,504	40.0	▼7.9	61,407	35.2	▼8.4
SPD	Isabel Mackensen (Note: Mackensen entered the Bundestag on the SPD list after the resignation of Katarina Barley in July 2019.)	44,032	25.3	▼3.3	37,894	21.7	▼4.1
AfD	Wolfgang Kräher	20,593	11.9		22,070	12.7	▲7.7
Greens	Misbah Khan	13,156	7.6	▼0.5	15,389	8.8	▲0.3
FDP	Markus Dürr	11,734	6.8	▲4.1	19,251	11.0	▲5.3
Left	Maximilian Keck	8,207	4.7	▲0.2	10,537	6.0	▲1.2
FW	Marion Schleicher-Frank	5,929	3.4	▲0.6	3,683	2.1	▲0.4
PARTEI					1,539	0.9	
Pirates					774	0.4	▼1.8
NPD					559	0.3	▼0.8
V-Partei³					475	0.3	
ÖDP					363	0.2	▼0.1
BGE					329	0.2	
New Liberals	Thomas Cohnen	305	0.2				
Independent	Shanna Nuss	261	0.2				
MLPD					67	0.0	0.0
Informal votes		2,704			2,088		
Total valid votes		173,721			174,337		
Turnout		176,425	80.0	▲5.0			
CDU hold	Majority	25,472	14.7	▼4.6			

=== 2013 election ===
Federal election (2013): Neustadt – Speyer
Notes:	Blue background denotes the winner of the electorate vote. Pink background denotes a candidate elected from their party list. Yellow background denotes an electorate win by a list member, or other incumbent. A ✓ or ✗ denotes status of any incumbent, win or lose respectively.						
Party	Candidate	Votes	%	±%	Party votes	%	±%
CDU	✓ Norbert Schindler	77,345	47.9	▲3.2	71,072	43.7	▲7.7
SPD	Heike-Maria Mrosek-Handwerk	46,217	28.6	▲3.4	41,982	25.8	▲3.4
Greens	Jutta Paulus	13,054	8.1	▼0.5	13,915	8.5	▼1.7
Left	Wolfgang Förster	7,244	4.5	▼3.3	7,871	4.8	▼3.5
FW	Marion Schleicher-Frank	4,528	2.8		2,835	1.7	
FDP	Hartmut Lardon	4,355	2.7	▼6.6	9,337	5.7	▼11.0
AfD					7,995	4.9	
Pirates	Vincent Thenhart	4,189	2.6		3,660	2.2	▲0.4
NPD	Dörthe Armstroff	2,728	1.7	0.0	1,778	1.1	▼0.1
FAMILIE	Mark Anthony von Garnier	1,099	0.7	▼1.3			
REP					943	0.6	▼0.6
Party of Reason	Georg Semmler	811	0.5		611	0.4	
ÖDP					427	0.3	0.0
PRO					332	0.2	
MLPD					45	0.0	0.0
Informal votes		3,865			2,632		
Total valid votes		161,570			162,803		
Turnout		165,435	75.0	▲0.7			
CDU hold	Majority	31,128	19.3	▼0.1			

=== 2009 election ===
Federal election (2009): Neustadt – Speyer
Notes:	Blue background denotes the winner of the electorate vote. Pink background denotes a candidate elected from their party list. Yellow background denotes an electorate win by a list member, or other incumbent. A ✓ or ✗ denotes status of any incumbent, win or lose respectively.						
Party	Candidate	Votes	%	±%	Party votes	%	±%
CDU	✓ Norbert Schindler	71,481	44.6	▼0.2	57,953	36.0	▼1.6
SPD	Wolfgang Ressmann	40,404	25.2	▼12.9	36,117	22.4	▼10.7
FDP	Hartmut Lardon	14,870	9.3	▲4.7	26,987	16.7	▲5.1
Greens	Frank Peters	13,748	8.6	▲3.8	16,485	10.2	▲2.1
Left	Stefanie Beck	12,546	7.8	▲4.0	13,486	8.4	▲3.5
Pirates					3,030	1.9	
FAMILIE	Margarete Nickel	3,140	2.0		2,217	1.4	▲0.2
NPD	Dörthe Armstroff	2,710	1.7	▲0.7	1,935	1.2	▲0.2
REP					1,918	1.2	▼0.8
Independent	Viktor Kunz	1,283	0.8				
PBC					453	0.3	▼0.2
ÖDP					426	0.3	
DVU					116	0.1	
MLPD					44	0.0	0.0
Informal votes		3,870			2,884		
Total valid votes		160,182			161,168		
Turnout		164,052	74.2	▼6.6			
CDU hold	Majority	31,077	19.4	▲12.7			

=== 2005 election ===
Federal election (2005):Neustadt – Speyer
Notes:	Blue background denotes the winner of the electorate vote. Pink background denotes a candidate elected from their party list. Yellow background denotes an electorate win by a list member, or other incumbent. A ✓ or ✗ denotes status of any incumbent, win or lose respectively.						
Party	Candidate	Votes	%	±%	Party votes	%	±%
CDU	✓ Norbert Schindler	77,707	44.8	▲0.6	65,254	37.5	▼2.8
SPD	Birgit Roth	66,113	38.1	▼4.8	57,534	33.1	▼3.0
Greens	Roland Vogt	8,319	4.8	▼0.4	14,211	8.2	▼1.1
FDP	Christopher Probst	7,949	4.6	▼2.6	20,259	11.7	▲2.3
Left	Andreas Severidt	6,708	3.9		8,447	4.9	▲3.8
REP	Gisela Neumann	3,496	2.0		3,522	2.0	▲0.5
Familie					2,007	1.2	
NPD	Sven Altendorf	1,700	1.0		1,723	1.0	▲0.6
PBC	Rudi Blumenstiel	1,405	0.8		832	0.5	▲0.1
MLPD					88	0.1	
Informal votes		4,109			3,629		
Total valid votes		173,397			173,877		
Turnout		177,506	80.8	▼1.1			
CDU hold	Majority	11,594	6.7				
