= Geinsheim (Neustadt) =

- Stadtteil of Neustadt an der Weinstraße
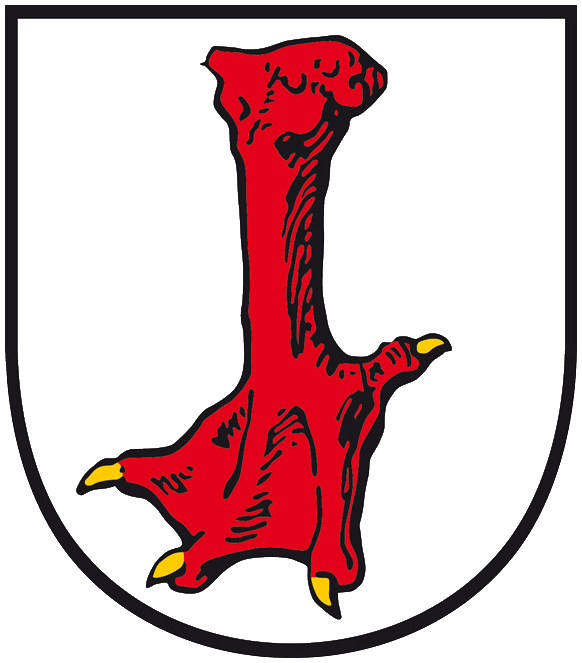
- Coat of arms

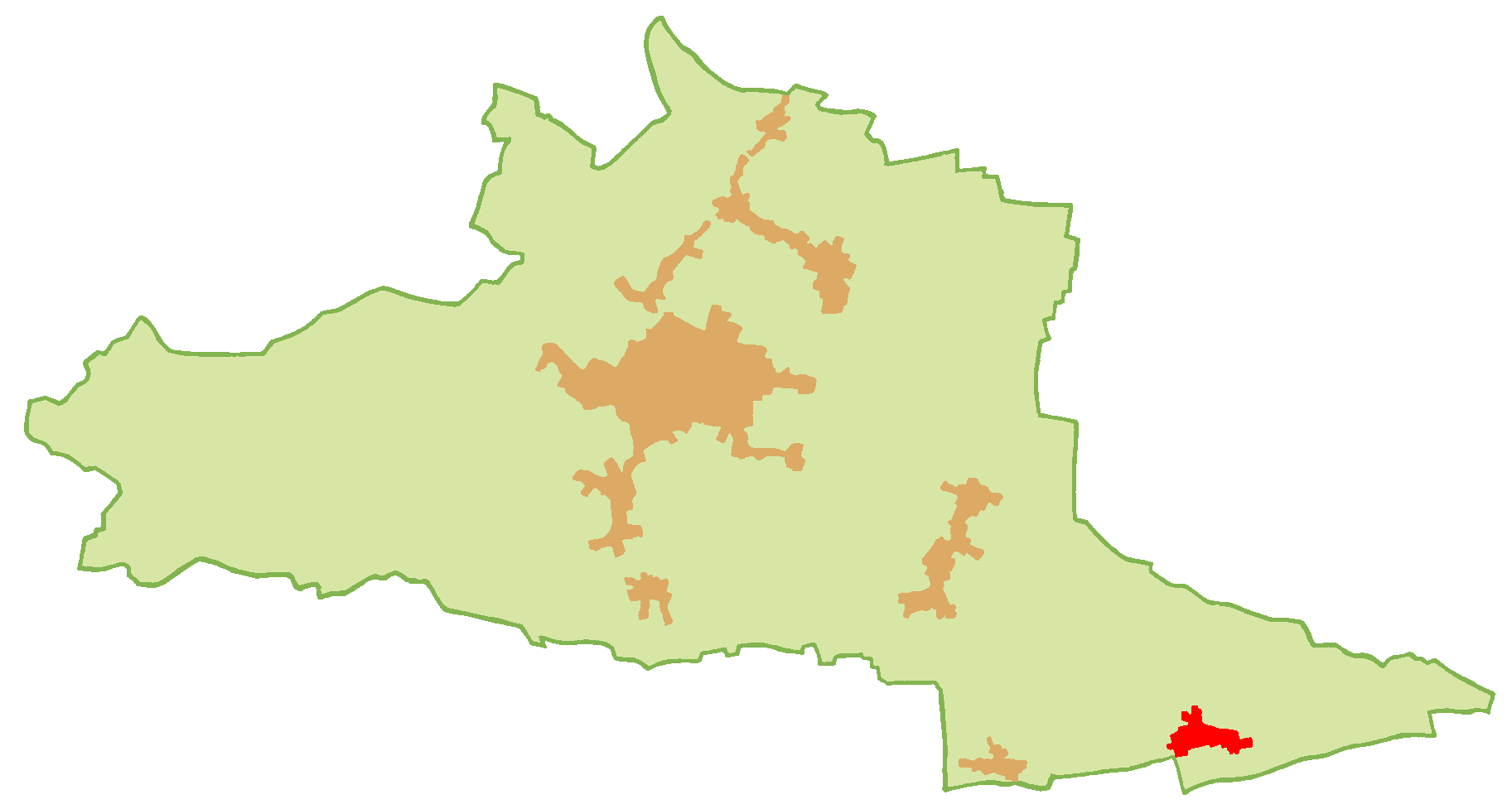
- Location of Geinsheim within Neustadt
- Interactive map of Geinsheim
- Location within Germany Location within Rhineland-Palatinate
- Coordinates: 49°18′16″N 08°15′22″E
- Country: Germany
- State: Rhineland-Palatinate
- District: Urban district
- Town: Neustadt an der Weinstraße
- Elevation: 113 m (371 ft)

Population (2012)
  - Total: 1,954
- Time zone: UTC+01:00 (CET)
  - Summer (DST): UTC+02:00 (CEST)
- Postal codes: 67435
- Dialling codes: 06327

Geinsheim is a village in the town of Neustadt an der Weinstraße in the Anterior Palatinate in the German state of Rhineland-Palatinate. It was incorporated into the town on 7 June 1969, its parent town lying 10 kilometres to the northwest of Geinsheim.

== Geography ==
The Palatine village of Geinsheim is a ribbon development that lies, as its name indicates, in the so-called Gäu, the flat terrain between the German Wine Road and the River Rhine, on the Upper Rhine Plain.

Geinsheim is roughly equidistant from Neustadt to the west and the town of Speyer to the east. Cycleways and footpaths, notably the Neustadt to Speyer cycleway, characterise the flat landscape, through which the Hörstengraben stream flows, north of the village, before emptying into the Speyerbach near Hanhofen.

Its neighbouring communities are, clockwise from the north, across a short piece (several metres) of the Neustadt village of Lachen-Speyerdorf, Haßloch in the district of Bad Dürkheim, Hanhofen and Harthausen in the district of Rhein-Pfalz-Kreis, Gommersheim and Böbingen in the district of Südliche Weinstraße and Duttweiler another sub-district of Neustadt.

== Sights ==
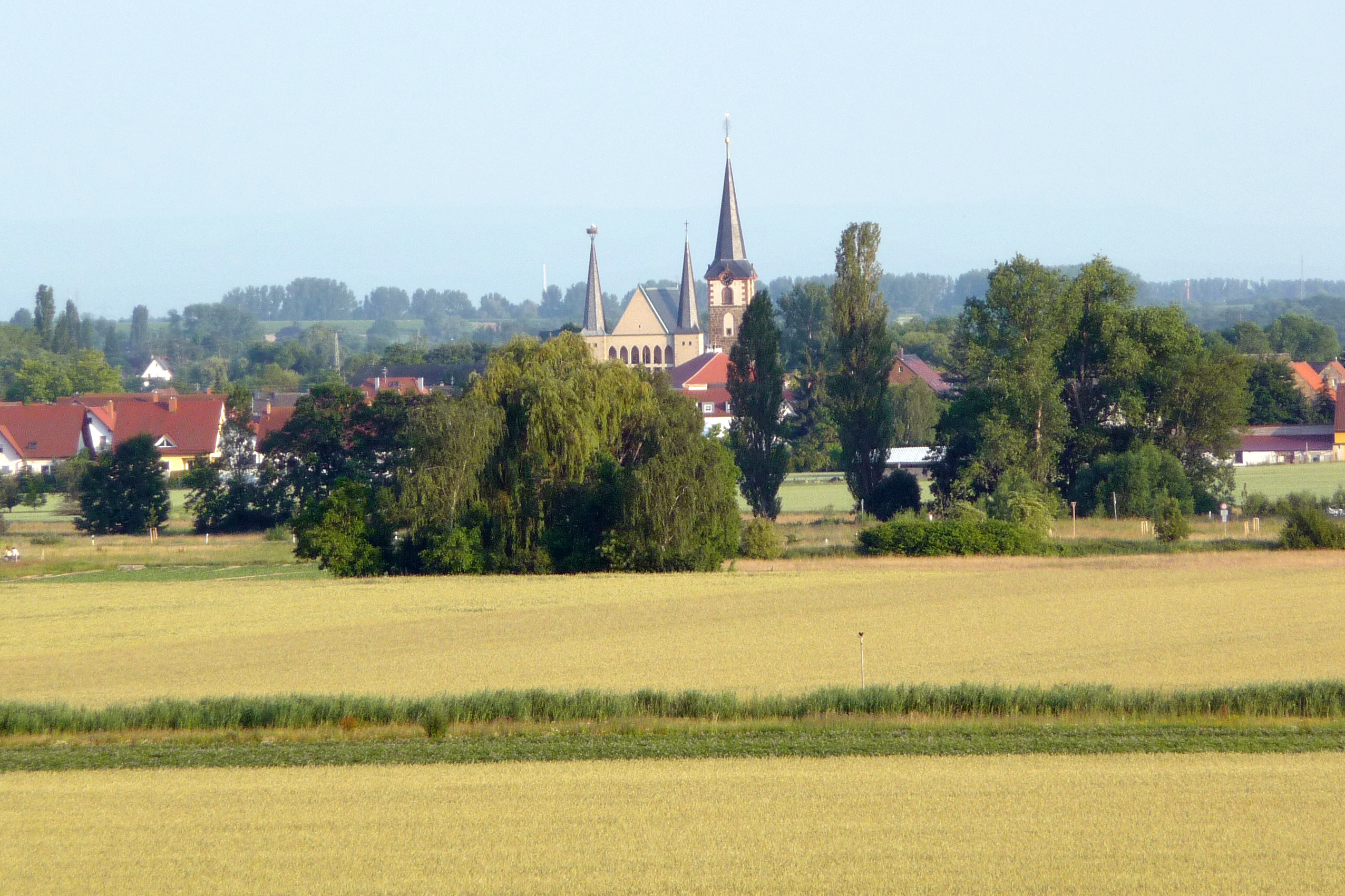
View of Geinsheim

=== Heritage site ===
The heart of the village, which is up to 500 years old, is protected as a heritage site.

=== Church buildings ===
The protected zone includes the landmark of the municipality, the Roman Catholic parish church of St. Peter und Paul with its Neogothic facade and its tower that, for some time, has once again been a nesting place for the white stork. It is the largest church in the Gäu and is therefore known by the locals as the Gäu-Dom or "Gäu Cathedral". The church was built around 1500 and the tower and choir with its sacristy date to that period.

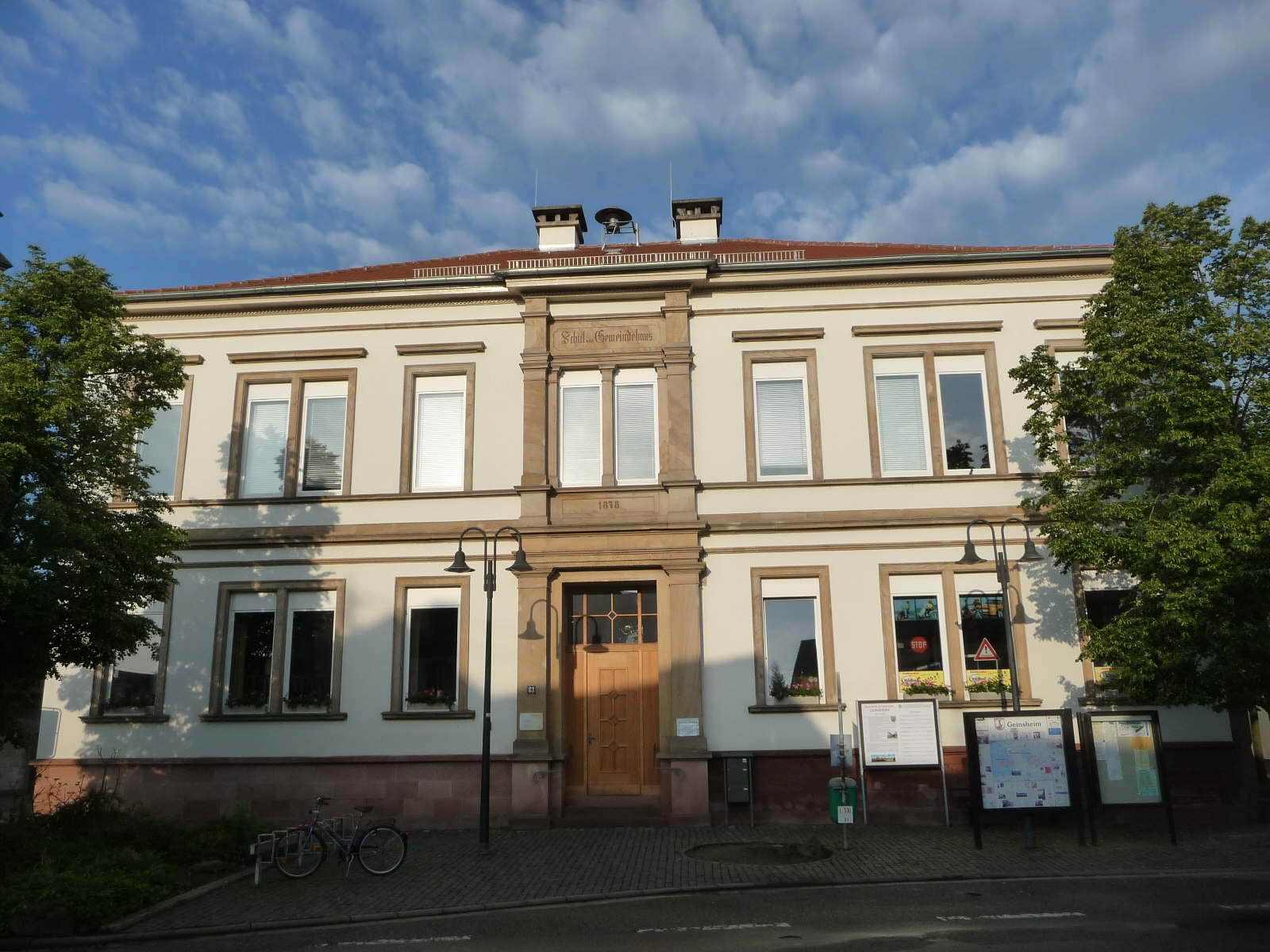
School and community hall

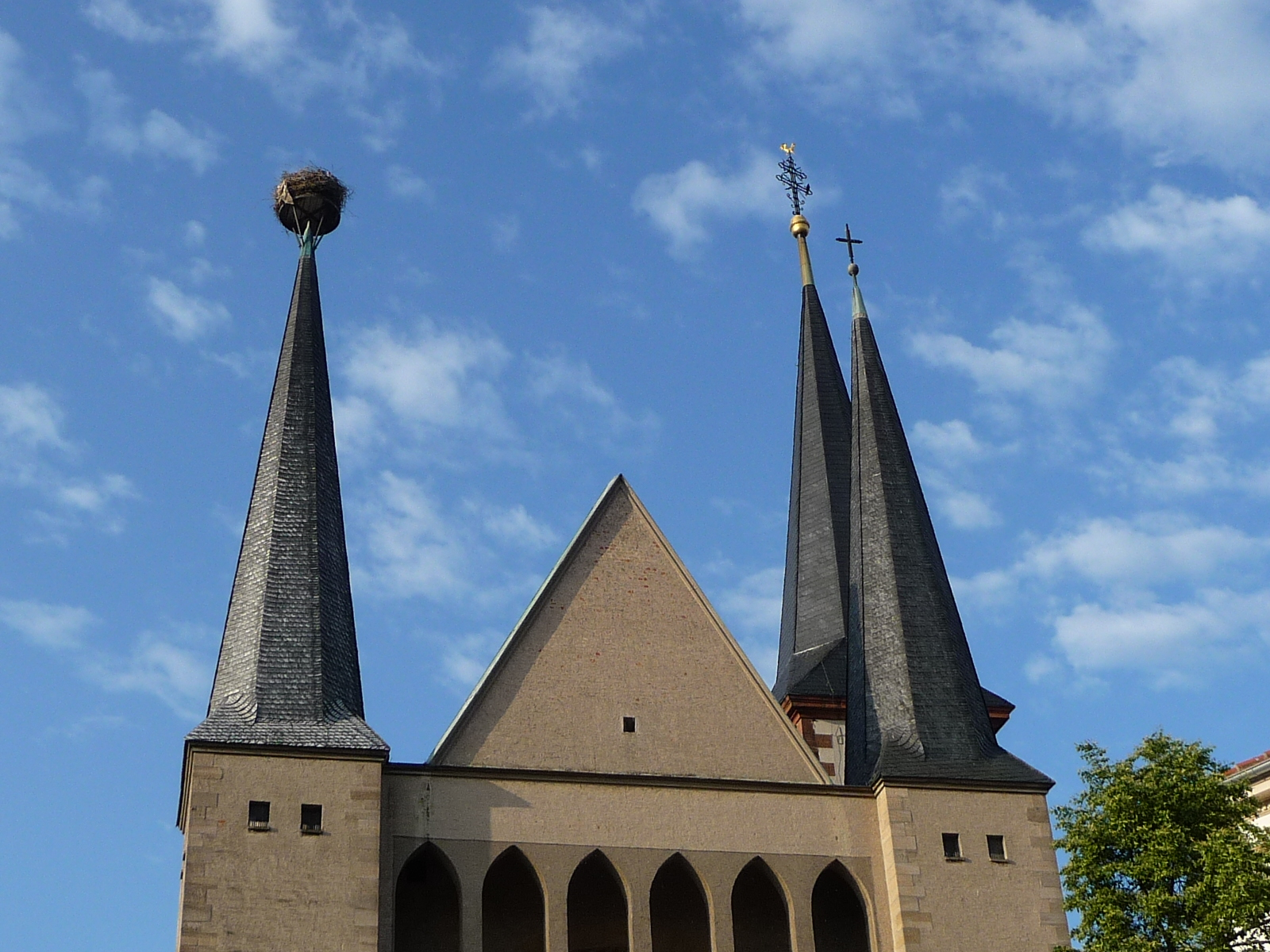
Towers of the parish church

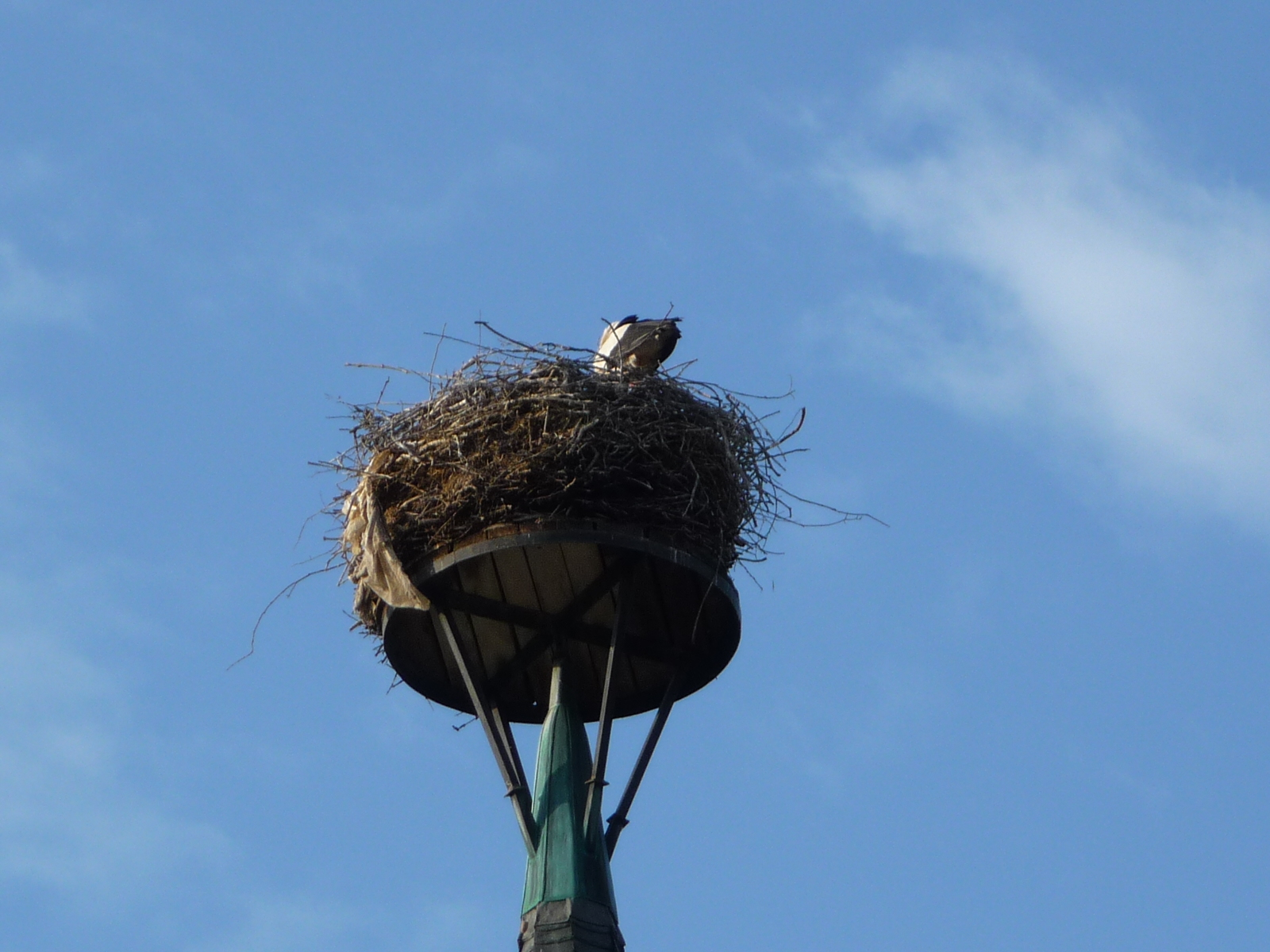
Storks' nest on the church tower

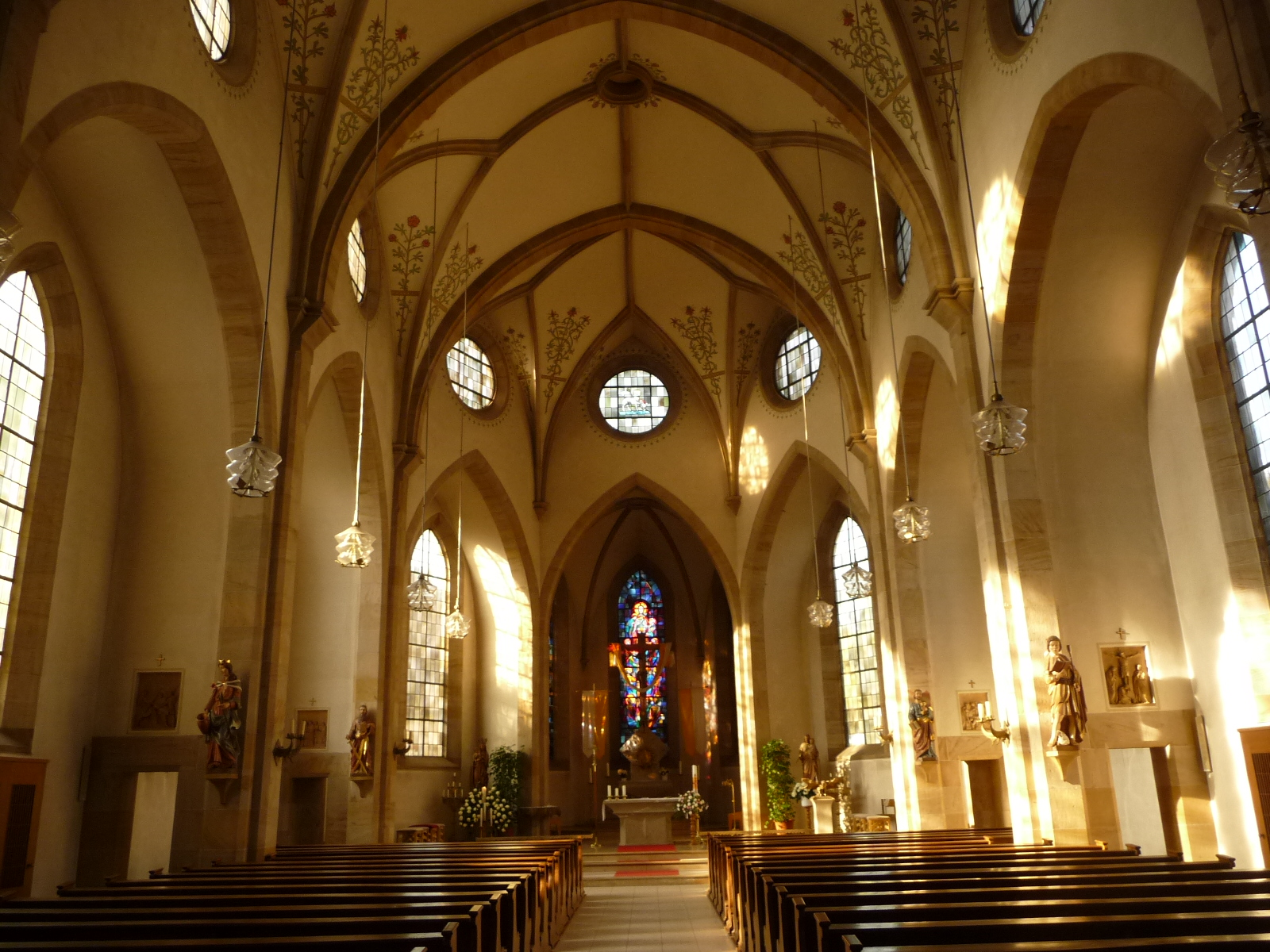
Interior of the parish church

=== Secular buildings ===
The oldest secular building in the conservation zone, with the address Gäustraße 96, dates to the year 1600 and is built in the Renaissance style. The estate farm in Gäustraße 79/81, with its barn in which the donations to Speyer's cathedral chapter were stored, dates to the Baroque period. The old Classicist school building, in which the village council is now house, as well as several double and three-sided farmsteads, date to the 18th to 20th centuries and complete the conservation zone.

== Economy and Infrastructure ==
=== Economy ===
In addition to some wine the main crops are asparagus, tobacco, sugar beet, grain and potatoes. Home-grown fruit and vegetables are often sold by the growers immediately in front of their house on the road or in the farmyards.

=== Transport ===
Geinsheim is on the B 39 federal highway from Neustadt to Speyer. After decades of planning and four years of construction work the 3.4 kilometre long ring road was opened on 30 August 2005. With the completion of this bypass to the north of the village, the last ring road on this 18-kilometre long stretch of the B 39 between Neustadt and Speyer was finished. Over 10,000 vehicles pass Geinsheim daily.

Geinsheim is also connected via the B 39 to the national road network. Six kilometres to the west is the A 65 motorway from Ludwigshafen am Rhein to Karlsruhe; the nearest junction being Neustadt-Süd. 10 kilometres to the east is the B 9 (Ludwigshafen–Wörth am Rhein, junction Speyer-Mitte), via which the A 61 (Koblenz–Hockenheim, junction Speyer-Nord), 4 kilometres beyond, can be reached.

=== Clubs ===
The Chorsängern 1791 Geinsheim claims to be Germany's oldest male voice choir. There is a football club, SV 1920 Geinsheim that once played in the Oberliga-Verein. In 1973, an 18-hole golf course was opened by the Golf-Club Pfalz ("Palatinate Golf Club").

=== Festivals ===
On the last weekend in August, Geinsheim celebrates the traditional wine festival known as the Wein- und Ludwigskerwe. The 3rd weekend in June is the occasion of the two-day fire service festival run by the Geinsheim Fire Service (Löschgruppe Geinsheim).

=== Population growth ===
Geinsheim was originally a typical farming and wine-growing village; today it is increasingly a residential suburb of Neustadt. In June 2011 Geinsheim had a population of 1,937; in January 2012 it had fallen to 1,954.

== Sons and daughters of the village ==
- Theodor Schneider (1703–1764), Jesuit; first German Roman Catholic missionary in the USA
- Thaddäus Stahler (1857–1938), prelate; canon, dean and Domdekan in the Bishopric of Würzburg as well as the chairman of the Bavarian Clergy Association for many years.
