= Dudenhofen =

- Municipality
- Coat of arms

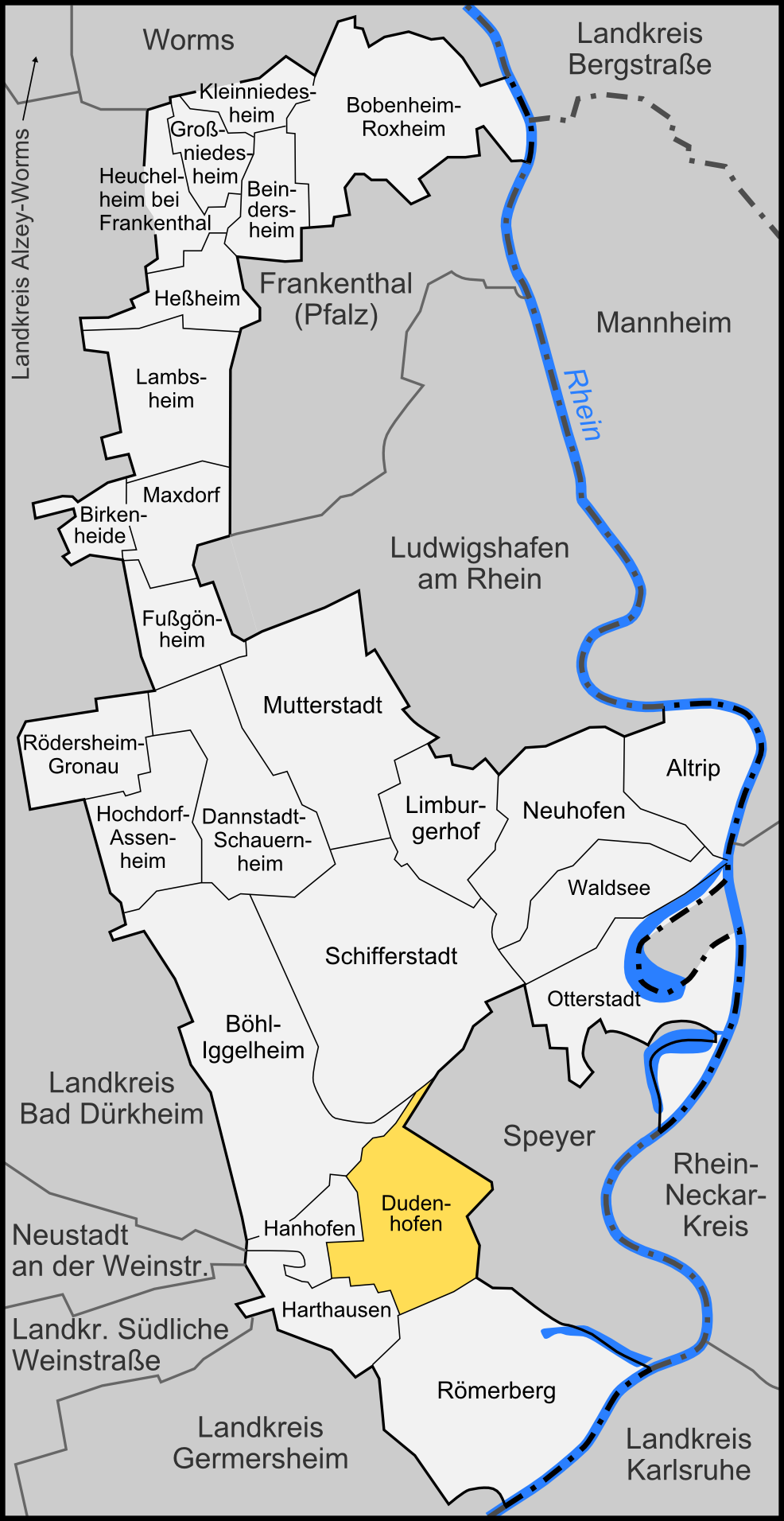
- Location of Dudenhofen within Rhein-Pfalz-Kreis district
- Interactive map of Dudenhofen
- Location within Germany Location within Rhineland-Palatinate
- Coordinates: 49°19′4″N 8°23′26″E
- Country: Germany
- State: Rhineland-Palatinate
- District: Rhein-Pfalz-Kreis
- Municipal assoc.: Römerberg-Dudenhofen

Government
  - Mayor (2019–24): Jürgen Hook (SPD)

Area
  - Total: 12.95 km^{2} (5.00 sq mi)
- Elevation: 105 m (344 ft)

Population (2025-12-31)
  - Total: 6,061
  - Density: 468.0/km^{2} (1,212/sq mi)
- Time zone: UTC+01:00 (CET)
  - Summer (DST): UTC+02:00 (CEST)
- Postal codes: 67373
- Dialling codes: 06232
- Vehicle registration: RP
- Website: www.dudenhofen.de

Dudenhofen (German pronunciation: [duːdn̩ˈhoːfn̩]) is a municipality in Rhineland-Palatinate, Germany. It is situated about 3 kilometers west of Speyer. Dudenhofen is the seat of the Verbandsgemeinde ("collective municipality") Römerberg-Dudenhofen.

== Notable people ==
- Jürgen Creutzmann (born 1945), member of the state parliament of Rhineland-Palatinate from 1989 to 2009, vice president of the state parliament from 2001 to 2006 and member of the Europaparlie from 2009 to 2014.
- Edward Duyker (born 1955), Australian writer and historian. Wrote in his biography François Péron about the occupation of Dudenhofens in 1793.
- Jan van Eijden (born 1976), former course cyclist, Olympic champion in Sydney 2000, coach of the British National Cycling Team.
- Olaf Schmäler (* 1969), former Bundesliga footballer, was a youth coach at football club FV Dudenhofen.
- Martin Faustmann (1841-1868), chief forester of Dudenhofen, whose analysis of the optimal rotation problem helped establish the field of forest economics (see Faustmann's formula).
- Nikolaus von Weis (1796-1869), Catholic theologian, Bishop of Speyer, was pastor in Dudenhofen.
