= Theo Magin =

German politician (1932–2025)

Member of the Bundestag for Neustadt – Speyer
- In office 4 November 1980 – 10 November 1994
- Preceded by: Georg Gölter
- Succeeded by: Norbert Schindler

Personal details
- Born: 15 December 1932; Schifferstadt, Bavaria, Germany
- Died: 28 January 2025 (aged 92)
- Political party: CDU
- Education: University of Heidelberg
- Occupation: School administrator

Theo Magin (15 December 1932 – 28 January 2025) was a German politician. A member of the Christian Democratic Union, he served in the Bundestag from 1980 to 1994.

Magin died on 28 January 2025, at the age of 92.
