= Dudenhofen (Verbandsgemeinde) =

Coordinates: 49.318°N 8.391°E

Dudenhofen is a Verbandsgemeinde ("collective municipality") in the district Rhein-Pfalz-Kreis, in Rhineland-Palatinate, Germany. The seat of the Verbandsgemeinde is in Dudenhofen.

The Verbandsgemeinde Dudenhofen consists of the following Ortsgemeinden ("local municipalities"):

Verbandsgemeinde; Dudenhofen		11 304 inhabitants	27.1 km²
	Dudenhofen	5.812 inhabitants	13 km²
	Hanhofen	2 410 inhabitants	5.8 km²
	Harthausen	3 082 inhabitants	8.4 km²

^{*}seat of the Verbandsgemeinde
