= Martin Faustmann =

German forest economist (1822 - 1876)

- Born: 19 February 1822; Babenhausen
- Died: 1 February 1876 (aged 53)

Martin Faustmann was a German forester who is regarded as the father of forest economics. His 1849 analysis of the optimal rotation problem, often referred to as the Faustmann formula, remains in widespread use in natural resource valuation and policy analysis, and continues to be a topic of active research.

== Biography ==
Faustmann studied Catholic theology at the University of Giessen for one semester in 1841 before turning to forestry. He completed his examinations in 1848 and became the chief forester of Dudenhofen near Darmstadt, where he remained until his death.

== Scientific contributions ==
A foundational problem in the economics of forest management concerns the optimal age at which a stand should be harvested (i.e. whether it would be better to harvest and sell younger trees today, or wait for them to grow and obtain a larger timber sale revenue later).

The key insight of Faustmann's formula is that because timber is a renewable resource, it is not possible to answer this question by accounting for standing timber alone. Although the impatient forester receives a smaller payment by harvesting younger trees, they also gain the opportunity to re-plant sooner. In other words, if a patient forester chooses to let their stand grow for an additional decade, they might receive a much larger timber sale revenue, but at the cost of delaying the next rotation: after harvesting, they are left with bare land, while their impatient colleague now has 10-year-old-trees.

Faustmann's formula allows forest managers to consistently solve for the optimal harvest age given information about the growth rate of the stand, expected timber prices, and a discount rate. The formula circumvents the problem of infinite regress because it can be simplified and solved as a geometric series. Because it accounts for the time value of money (or the opportunity cost of delaying a harvest), the financially optimal Faustmann rotation is generally shorter than the biologically optimal rotation age.
