= Johannes Steiniger =

German politician

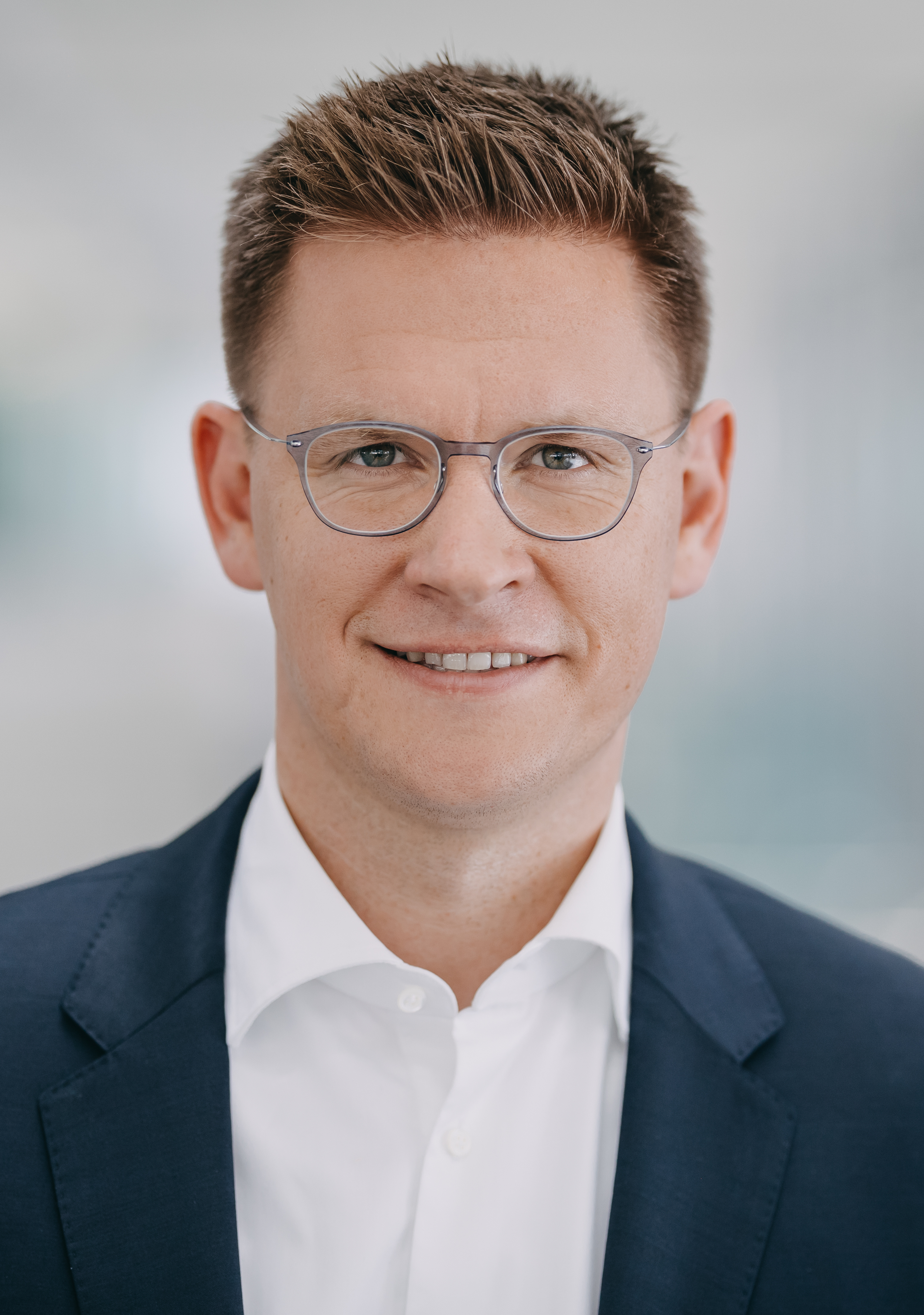
- Steiniger in 2019

Member of the Bundestag
- Incumbent
- Assumed office 2013

Personal details
- Born: 18 June 1987 (age 39) Bad Dürkheim, West Germany (now Germany)
- Party: CDU
- Education: University of Mannheim

Johannes Steiniger (born 18 June 1987) is a German teacher and politician of the Christian Democratic Union (CDU) who has been serving as a member of the Bundestag from the state of Rhineland-Palatinate since 2013.

In addition to his work in parliament, Steiniger has been serving as a Parliamentary State Secretary at the Federal Ministry for Economic Affairs and Energy in the government of Chancellor Friedrich Merz since 2026.

== Political career ==
=== Beginnings ===
Steiniger joined the CDU in 2003. From 2010 until 2018, he served as chairman of the Young Union (JU) in Rhineland-Palatinate.

=== Member of the German Parliament, 2013–present ===
Steiniger first became a member of the Bundestag in the 2013 German federal election, representing the Neustadt – Speyer district. He is a member of the Finance Committee and the Sports Committee. On the Finance Committee, he is his parliamentary group's rapporteur on climate protection. From 2020 until 2021, he was also involved in the parliamentary inquiry into the Wirecard scandal.

In 2014, Steiniger led efforts to remove fellow politician Sven Heibel from the board of the JU in Rhineland-Palatinate after Heibel caused national outrage by calling for the partial reintroduction of criminal liability for homosexuality.

== Other activities ==
- European Foundation for the Speyer Cathedral, Member of the Board of Trustees
- Sparkasse Rhein Haardt, Member of the Supervisory Board (since 2019)
- Federal Agency for Civic Education (BPB), Alternate Member of the Board of Trustees

== Political positions ==
In June 2017, Steiniger voted against his parliamentary group's majority and in favor of Germany's introduction of same-sex marriage.

Ahead of the Christian Democrats’ leadership election, Steiniger publicly endorsed in 2020 Friedrich Merz to succeed Annegret Kramp-Karrenbauer as the party's chair. For the 2021 national elections, he later endorsed Markus Söder as the Christian Democrats' joint candidate to succeed Chancellor Angela Merkel.
