= Mean annual increment =

The mean annual increment (MAI) or mean annual growth refers to the average growth per year a tree or stand of trees has exhibited/experienced up to a specified age. For example, a 20-year-old tree that has a stem volume of 0.2 m^{3} has an MAI of 0.01 m^{3}/year. MAI is calculated as $MAI=Y(t)/t$ where $Y(t)$ = yield at time $t$. For a stand of trees the total stem volume (m^{3}) per area (ha) is typically calculated. Because the typical growth pattern of a forest is sigmoidal, the MAI starts out small, increases to a maximum value as the trees mature, then declines slowly over time as some trees' canopies face competition for sunlight and older trees die off. (Note: Sigmoidal growth only applies to the total volume of a stand of trees. It has sometimes been assumed that the growth rate of individual trees also follows a sigmoidal curve, but this has been disproven. Individual trees generally grow at an accelerating rate as they get older.'"`UNIQ--ref-00000001-QINU`"')

Throughout this, the MAI always remains positive. MAI differs from periodic annual increment (PAI) in that the PAI is the growth for one specific year or any other specified length of time.

MAI vs PAI

The point where the MAI and PAI meet is at the point of maximum MAI and is typically referred to as the biologically optimal rotation age. This is the age at which the tree or stand would be harvested if the management objective is to maximize long-term yield. The proof of this definition is shown by differentiating $MAI(t)$ with respect to $t$, and is shown by Husch, Miller, and Beers.
