= Isabel Mackensen-Geis =

German politician

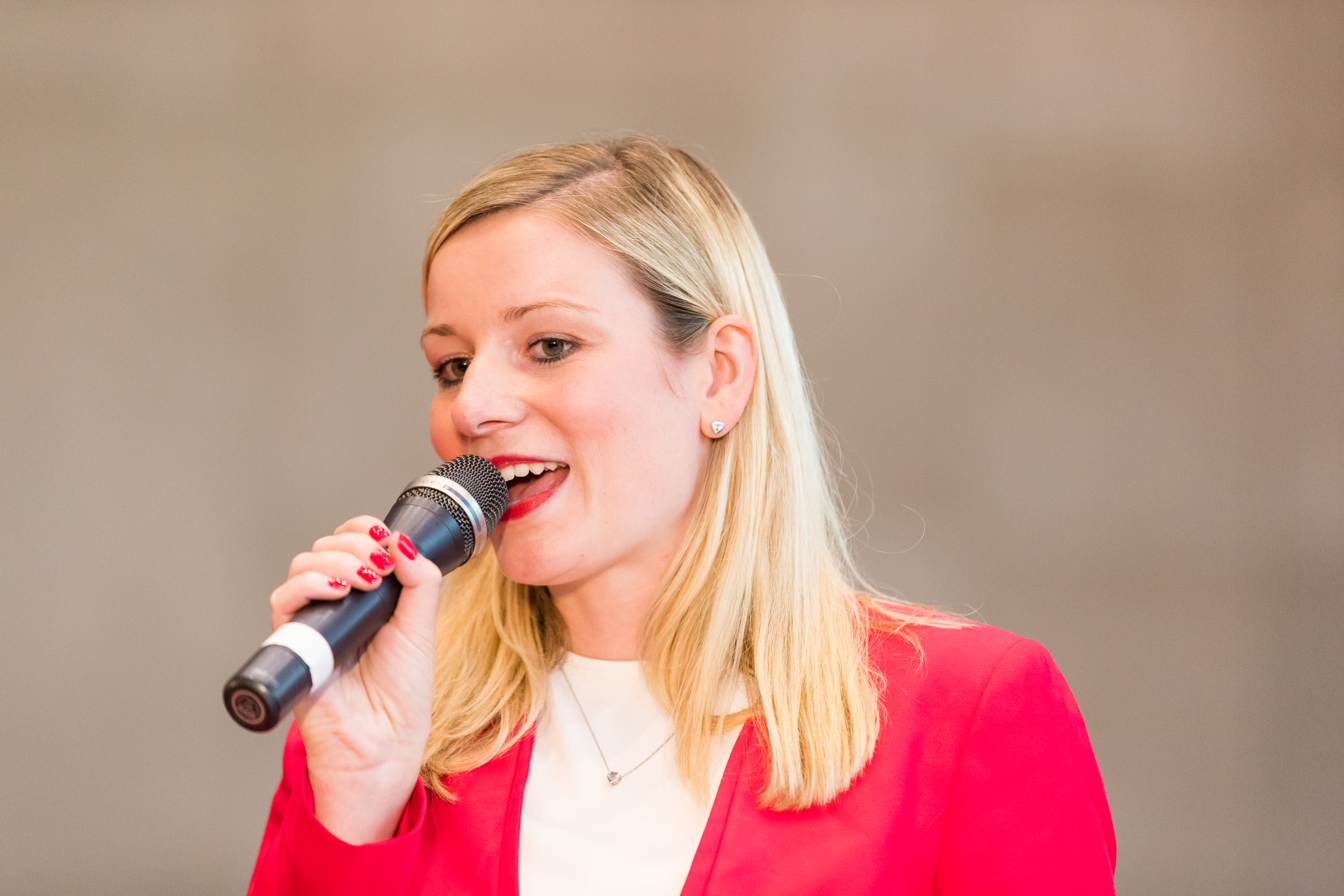
- Isabel Mackensen-Geis in 2017

Member of the Bundestag for Rhineland-Palatinate
- Incumbent
- Assumed office 2 July 2019
- Preceded by: Katarina Barley

Personal details
- Born: 29 September 1986 (age 40) Schwetzingen, West Germany
- Party: SPD
- Education: University of Trier

Isabel Mackensen-Geis (born 29 September 1986 as Isabel Mackensen) is a German politician of the Social Democratic Party (SPD) and member of the Bundestag, the German parliament, since 2019.

== Early life and education ==
Mackensen-Geis was born in Schwetzingen and grew up in Niederkirchen bei Deidesheim (where she still has her home). After passing her Abitur in 2006 at the Kurfürst-Ruprecht-Gymnasium (secondary school) in Neustadt an der Weinstraße, she studied political science and history at the University of Trier, graduating with an MA in 2012.

== Political career ==
Mackensen-Geis became an SPD member in 2009 and was chair of the Palatinate regional section of the Young Socialists in the SPD from 2013 to 2017. In 2019, she was elected a member of the district council of Bad Dürkheim.

In the 2017 German federal election, Mackensen was the SPD candidate for the Neustadt – Speyer district and came second with 25.3% of the vote. Mackensen became a Bundestag member via her party list after Katarina Barley, having been elected to the European Parliament, resigned her seat in the German parliament. She served on the Committee on Food and Agriculture and was re-elected via the SPD-list in the 2021 German federal election.

Within her parliamentary group, Mackensen-Geis belongs to the Parliamentary Left, a left-wing movement.

In the negotiations to form a so-called traffic light coalition of the SPD, the Green Party and the Free Democratic Party (FDP) following the 2021 federal elections, Mackensen-Geis was part of her party's delegation in the working group on environmental policy, co-chaired by Rita Schwarzelühr-Sutter, Steffi Lemke and Stefan Birkner.
