= Extended rotation forest =

An extended rotation forest is a forest stand for which the harvest age is increased beyond the optimum economic harvest age to provide larger trees, wildlife habitat, and other non-timber values.

Advantages of extended rotation forestry included enhanced carbon storage, better wood quality and the ability to create habitat for old growth dependent species. The main disadvantages of extended rotations is the lower present value of the stand and timber supply issues. These impacts can be mitigated by the application of commercial thinning. In the Pacific Northwest of the United States, commercially thinned stands have yet to reach cumulation age in spite of reaching ages of over 100 years on good to moderate sites. In managed for values other than timber, extended rotations are being considered. In Oregon, some environmental groups are calling for rotations as long as 250 years. The argument centres on the assertion that short-rotation management on either biological or financial rotations leads to significant losses of wood production potential as well as external costs to society.
