= Faustmann's formula =

Forestry equation

Faustmann's formula, or the Faustmann model, gives the present value of the income stream for forest rotation. It was derived by the German forester Martin Faustmann in 1849.

The rotation problem, deciding when to cut down the forest, means solving the problem of maximising Faustmann's formula and this was solved by Bertil Ohlin in 1921 to become the Faustmann-Ohlin theorem, although other German foresters were aware of the correct solution in 1860.

ƒ(T) is the stock of timber at time T
p the price of timber and is constant
which implies that the value of the forest at time T is pf(T)
r is the discount rate and is also constant.

The Faustmann formula is as follows:

$$PV = pf(T) \exp(-rT) \cdot {(1 + \exp(-rT) + \exp(-2rT) + \cdots) } = \frac{pf(T)}{\exp(rT) - 1}.$$

From this formula two theorems are interpreted:

The optimal time to cut the forest is when the time rate of change of its value is equal to interest on the value of the forest plus the interest on the value of the land.

The optimal time to cut is when the time rate of change of its value is equal to the interest rate modified by land rent.

== See also ==
- Hotelling's rule
