= Römerberg-Dudenhofen =

- Verbandsgemeinde
- Interactive map of Römerberg-Dudenhofen
- Location within Germany Location within Rhineland-Palatinate
- Coordinates: 49°19′N 8°23′E
- Country: Germany
- State: Rhineland-Palatinate
- District: Rhein-Pfalz-Kreis
- Seat: Dudenhofen
- Subdivisions: 4 municipalities

Area
  - Total: 54.97 km^{2} (21.22 sq mi)

Population (2025-12-31)
  - Total: 21,490
  - Density: 390.9/km^{2} (1,013/sq mi)
- Time zone: UTC+01:00 (CET)
  - Summer (DST): UTC+02:00 (CEST)
- Website: www.vgrd.de

Römerberg-Dudenhofen is a Verbandsgemeinde ("collective municipality") in the district Rhein-Pfalz-Kreis, in Rhineland-Palatinate, Germany. The seat of the Verbandsgemeinde is in Dudenhofen. It was formed on 1 July 2014 by the merger of the former Verbandsgemeinde Dudenhofen and the formerly independent municipality Römerberg.

The Verbandsgemeinde Römerberg-Dudenhofen consists of the following Ortsgemeinden ("local municipalities"):

1. Dudenhofen
2. Hanhofen
3. Harthausen
4. Römerberg
