= Thomas Stephan (politician) =

German politician (born 1970)

Member of the Bundestag
- Incumbent
- Assumed office 25 March 2025
- Constituency: Rhineland-Palatinate

Personal details
- Born: 20 August 1970 (age 55)
- Party: Alternative for Germany

Thomas Stephan (born 20 August 1970) is a German politician who was elected as a member of the Bundestag in 2025. He has served as chairman of the Alternative for Germany in Bad Dürkheim since 2022.
