= Römerberg =

- Municipality
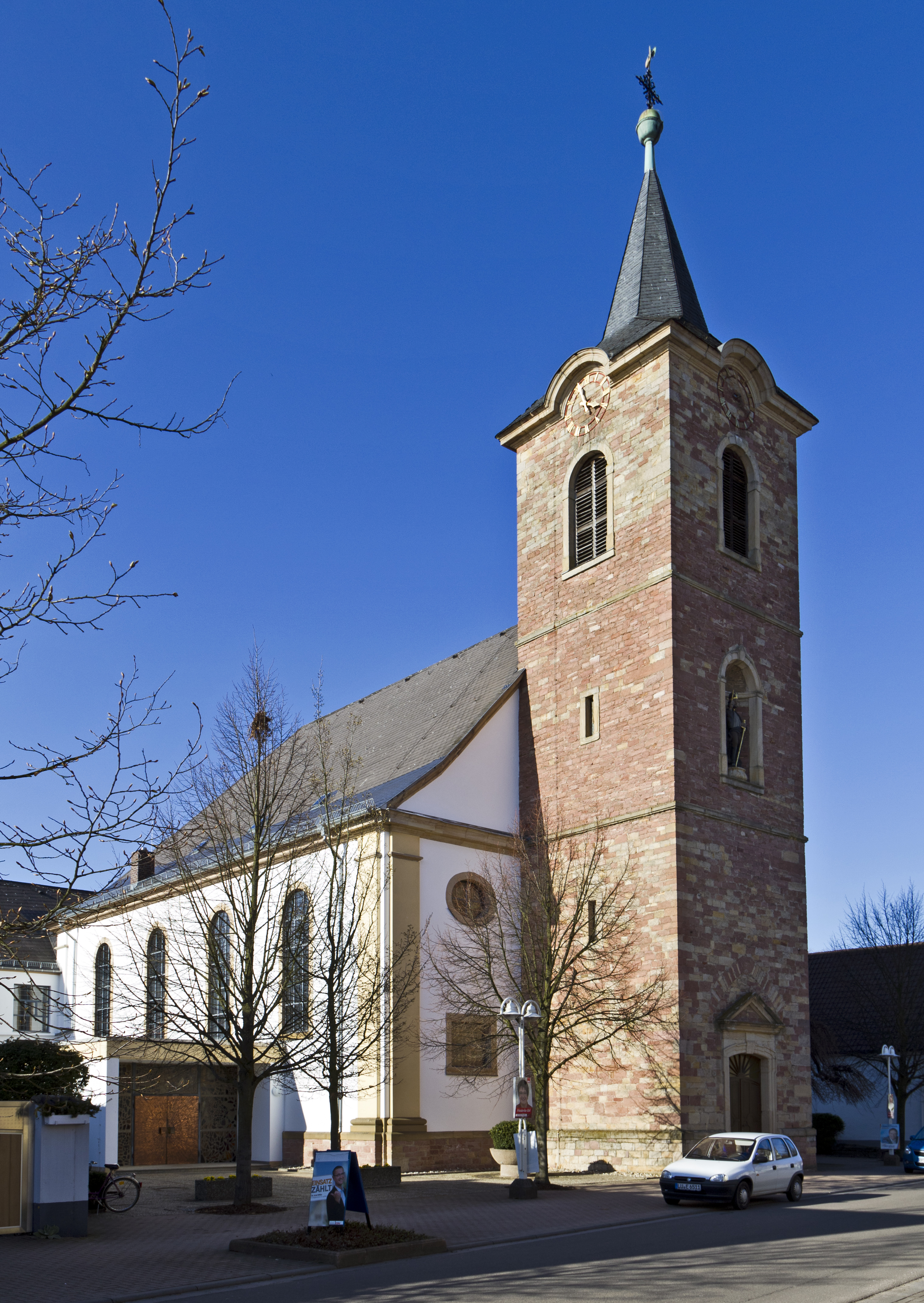
- Church of Saint Sigismund in Heiligenstein

- Coat of arms

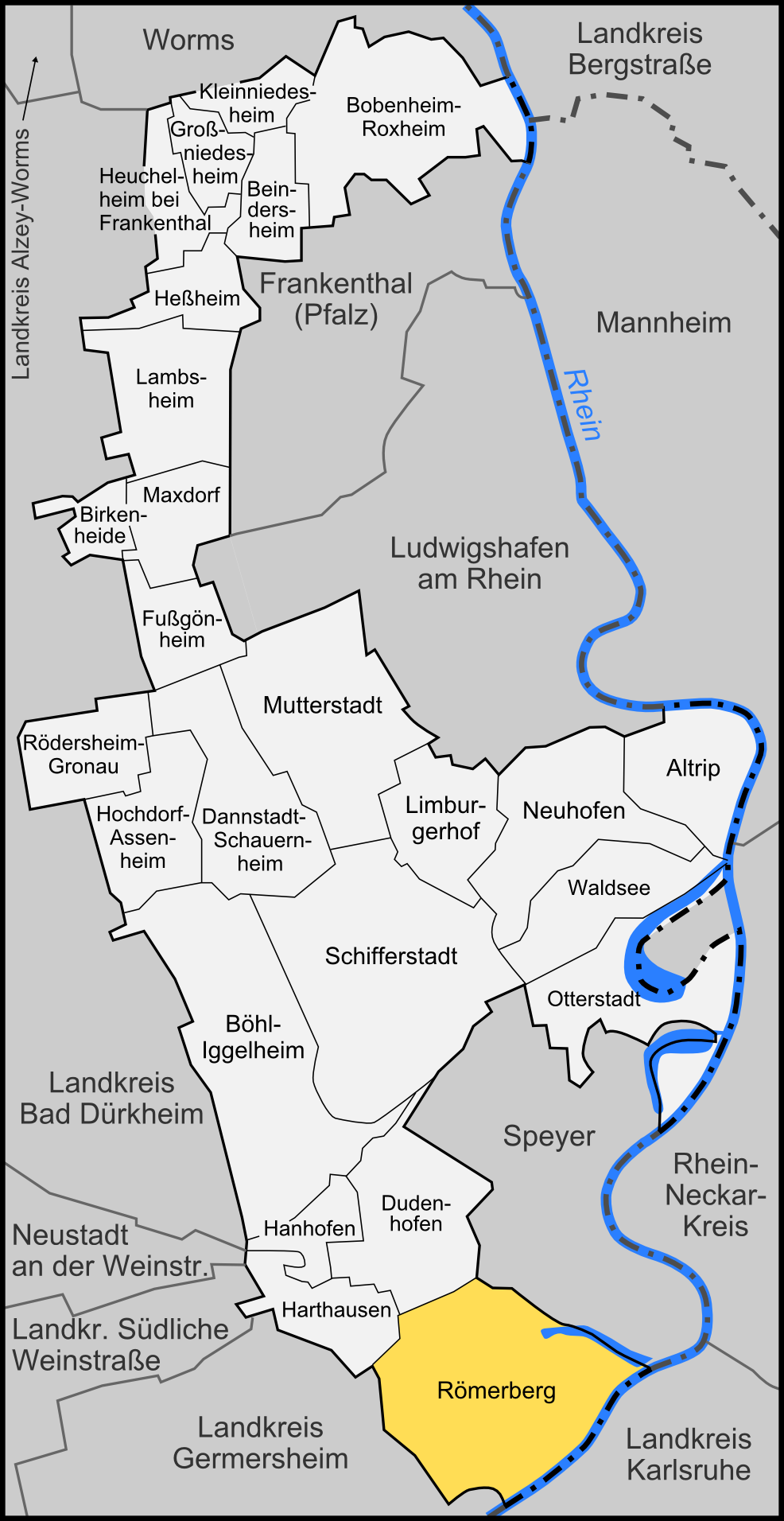
- Location of Römerberg within Rhein-Pfalz-Kreis district
- Interactive map of Römerberg
- Location within Germany Location within Rhineland-Palatinate
- Coordinates: 49°17′14″N 8°23′52″E
- Country: Germany
- State: Rhineland-Palatinate
- District: Rhein-Pfalz-Kreis
- Municipal assoc.: Römerberg-Dudenhofen
- Subdivisions: 3

Government
  - Mayor (2019–24): Matthias Hoffmann (Greens)

Area
  - Total: 27.85 km^{2} (10.75 sq mi)
- Elevation: 108 m (354 ft)

Population (2025-12-31)
  - Total: 9,603
  - Density: 344.8/km^{2} (893.1/sq mi)
- Time zone: UTC+01:00 (CET)
  - Summer (DST): UTC+02:00 (CEST)
- Postal codes: 67354
- Dialling codes: 06232
- Vehicle registration: RP
- Website: www.roemerberg.de

Römerberg (German pronunciation: [ˈʁøːmɐbɛʁk]) is a municipality in the Rhein-Pfalz-Kreis, in Rhineland-Palatinate, Germany. It is situated on the left bank of the Rhine, approximately 5 kilometres (3.1 mi) southwest of Speyer.

== History ==
The municipality of Römerberg was established by the fusion of the municipalities of Berghausen, Heiligenstein and Mechtersheim in 1969. The seat of the municipality is in the village Heiligenstein.
