= Norbert Schindler =

German politician

Norbert Schindler (born October 15, 1949 in Grünstadt) is a German politician and lobbyist of the Christian Democratic Party of Germany who served as a member of the Bundestag from 1994 bis 2017.

== Early life and education ==
Schindler grew up in Rodenbach (Ebertsheim), RP. After attending a Volksschule, he completed an apprenticeship in agriculture and finally passed the examination to become a master farmer. He has been running his own agricultural and wine-growing business in Bobenheim am Berg since 1972. He is vice president of the German Farmers' Association, honorary president of the Rhineland-Palatinate South Farmers' and Winegrowers' Association and president of the Rhineland-Palatinate Chamber of Agriculture. He was also a member of the board of directors of Landwirtschaftliche Rentenbank.

=== Private life ===
Schindler is Catholic, married and the father of two children.

== Political work ==
He joined the CDU in 1966 and was a member of the Bobenheim am Berg municipal council from 1979 to 1989. In 1991, he was elected chairman of the Bad Dürkheim CDU district association and in 1999 he became a member of the Bad Dürkheim district council (Kreistag).

Schindler was a member of the German Bundestag from 1994 to 2017. He always entered the Bundestag as a directly elected member of parliament for the Neustadt - Speyer constituency.

Candidate Votes Schindler received
Election	1994	1998	2002	2005	2009	2013
Votes #	49,8%	46.3%	44,2 %	44.8%	71,481 (44.6%)	77,345 (47.9%)

In 2016, Schindler announced that he would retire from politics in 2017 and no longer run for the Bundestag.

During his time in the parliament, Schindler was a member of the Committee on Economic Affairs and Energy and a deputy member of the Committee on Food and Agriculture. At the same time, he was also a biofuel and agricultural lobbyist. He sat on the supervisory board of the bioethanol company CropEnergies and received at least 30,000 euros a year for this. In the Bundestag, he defended the introduction of E10 fuel against criticism from environmental organisations. For his participation in other aforementioned lobbyist associations, he receives between €1,000 and €3,500 per month. From 2005 to 2023, he was the honorary federal chairman of the Federal Association of the German Bioethanol Industry.
