= Periodic annual increment =

Forestry term for change in size of tree on annual basis

In forestry, periodic annual increment (PAI) is the change in the size of a tree between the beginning and ending of a growth period, divided by the number of years that was designated as the growing period. For sigmoid growth, the graph of PAI increases rapidly and then quickly declines, approaching zero. PAI may go negative if a tree loses volume due to damage or disease. Periodic annual increment is commonly used instead of current annual increment as a basis for computing growth per cent. Growth per cent indicates the rate of increase with relation to the wood capital required for its production, this is usually based on a single year's growth.

== Equation ==
$PAI= \frac {Y_2-Y_1} {T_2-T_1}$

Where: Y is the yield (volume, height, DBH, etc.) at times 1 and 2 and T_{1} represents the year starting the growth period, and T_{2} is the end year.

Example: Say that the growth period is from age 5 to age 10, and the yield (height of the tree), is 14 feet at the beginning of the period and 34 feet at the end. Then: $\frac {34-14} {10-5} = 4 feet/year$

== Uses ==
The maximum point on the curve of PAI is the same as the inflection point on a graph of yield versus time. The inflection point is the point corresponding to the fastest change in yield.

When mean annual increment (MAI) and periodic annual increment (PAI) are graphed together, the point in which they intersect is called the biological rotation age. The biological rotation age is the age in which a stand should be harvested to maximize long-term yield.
