= Jürgen Creutzmann =

German politician of the Free Democratic Party (born 1945)

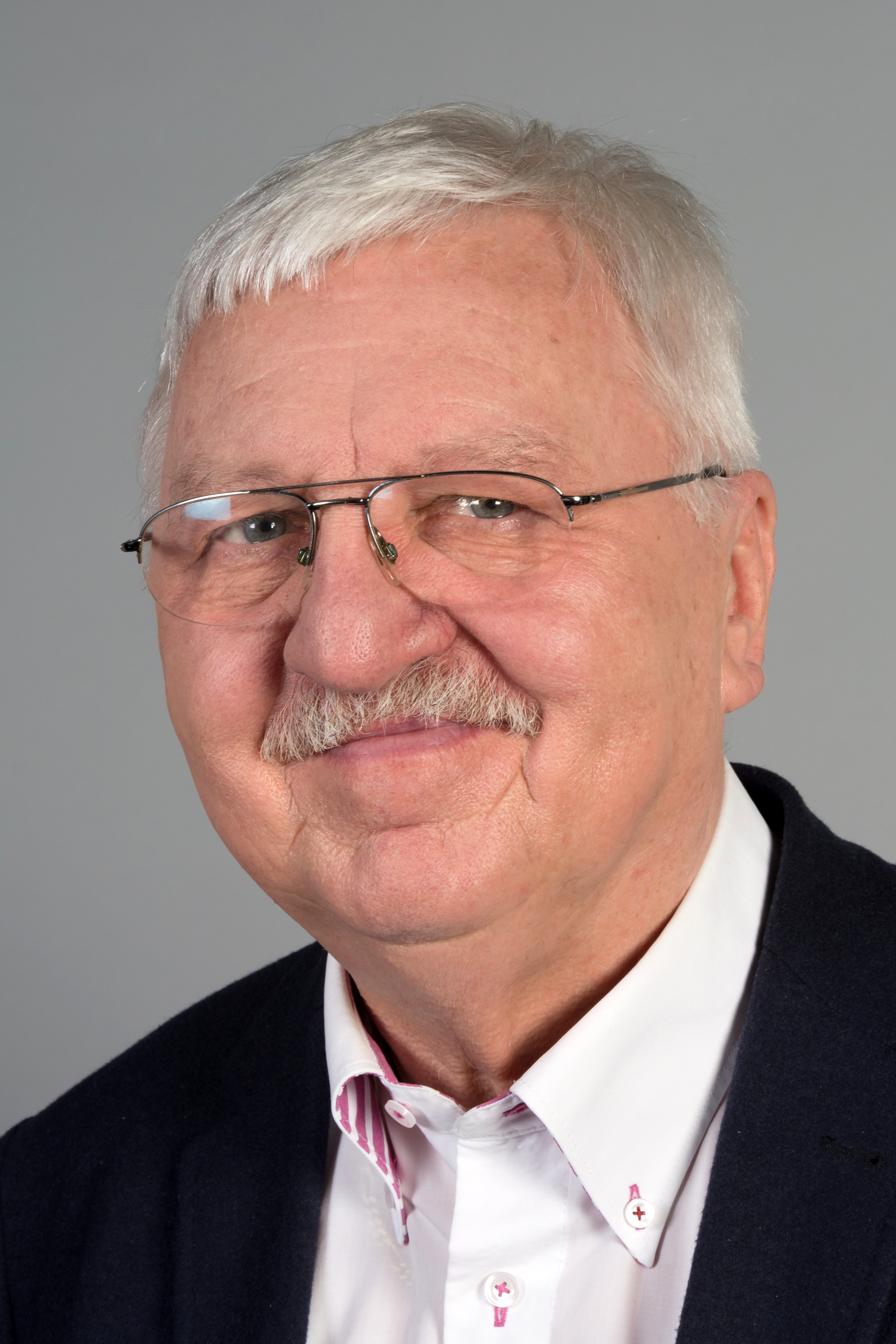
Jürgen Creutzmann 2014

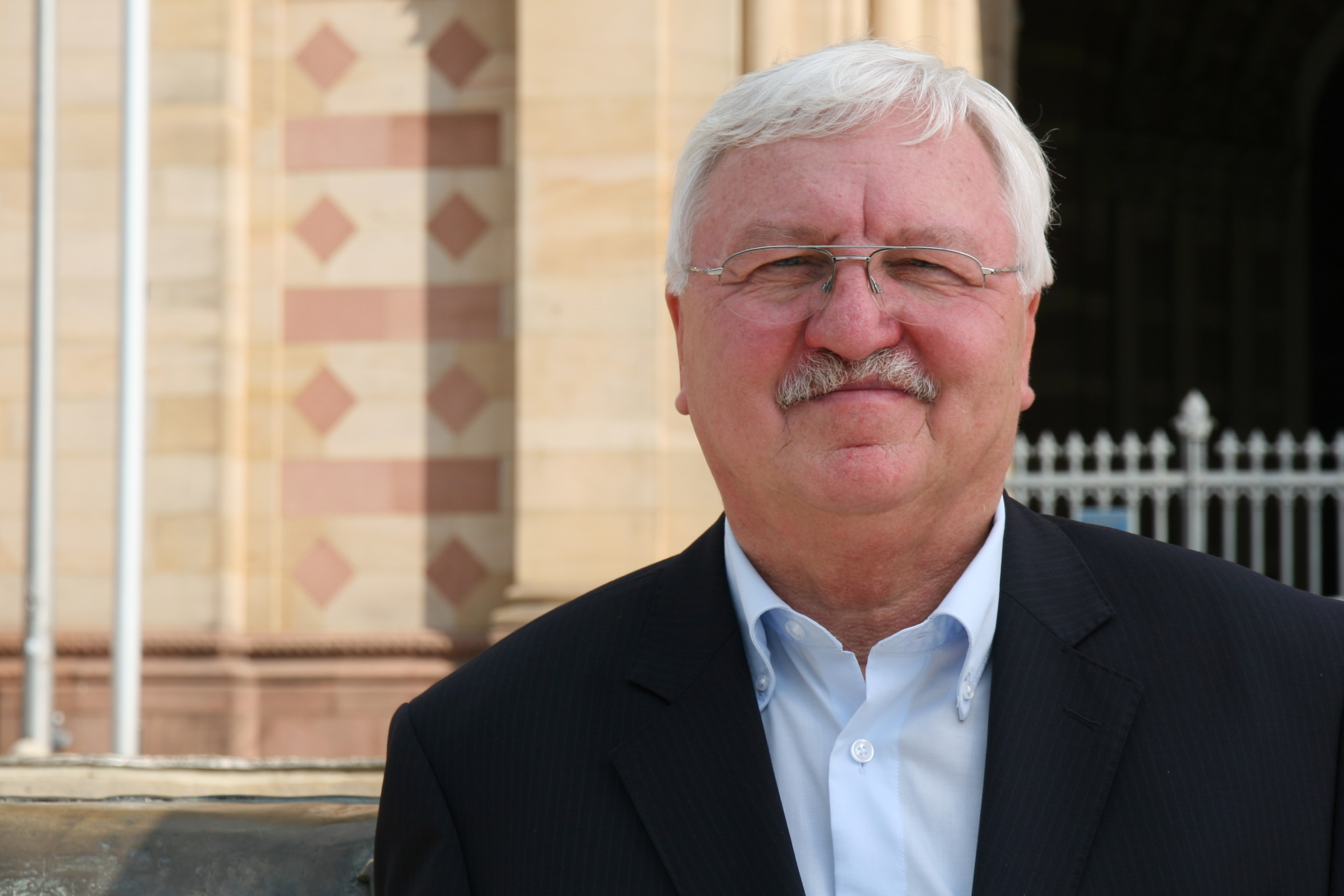
Jürgen Creutzmann in front of the Cathedral of Speyer

Jürgen Creutzmann (born 4 October 1945 in Speyer, Germany) is a German politician of the Free Democratic Party (FDP) who served as a member of the European Parliament from 2009 to 2014.

== Early life and work ==
Creutzmann was born in Speyer and finished secondary school in Heidelberg in 1966. Subsequently, he studied Business Administration at the University of Mannheim. After working for an audit firm, he began his career at the chemical company BASF in 1973, where he was employed until 2006. Between 1973 and 1988, he was responsible for the consolidated financial statement of the BASF SE Group. As Director Subsidiaries Accounting Services, he was responsible for the accountancy of 50 subsidiaries and holdings of BASF from 1988 until 2006.

Creutzmann is married with two children.

== Political career ==
=== Career in state politics ===
In 1965, Creutzmann became a member of the Jungdemokraten, then the FDP’s youth organisation, and was elected a member of the executive board of their regional group in Rhineland-Palatinate. He joined the FDP in the subsequent year and was leader of the FDP in Speyer between 1971 and 1973. Creutzmann became a member of the executive board of the FDP Rhineland-Palatinate in 1983 and has been its treasurer since then. In 1998, Creutzmann became a member of the Landtag of Rhineland-Palatinate. At first, Creutzmann was spokesman of the FDP’s parliamentary group in the Landtag and its vice chairman between 1999 and 2001. From 2006 until 2009, he was spokesman for European politics. Between 2001 and 2006, he was vice president of the Landtag and subsequently leader of its Committee for European affairs.

=== Member of the European Parliament, 2009–2014 ===
In 2009, Creutzmann was elected a member of the European Parliament and accordingly resigned his seat in the Landtag. He served the treasurer and member of the executive board of the FDP’s delegation in the European Parliament, which belongs to the Alliance of Liberals and Democrats for Europe (ALDE). He was a full member of the Committee on Internal Market and Consumer Protection, substitute member of the Committee on Employment and Social Affairs, and member of the parliament's delegation for relations with Canada. Furthermore, he served as vice chairman of the SME Intergroup, a working group open to all members of parliament which is concerned with the promotion of the interests of small and medium enterprises.
