= Harthausen =

- Municipality
- Coat of arms

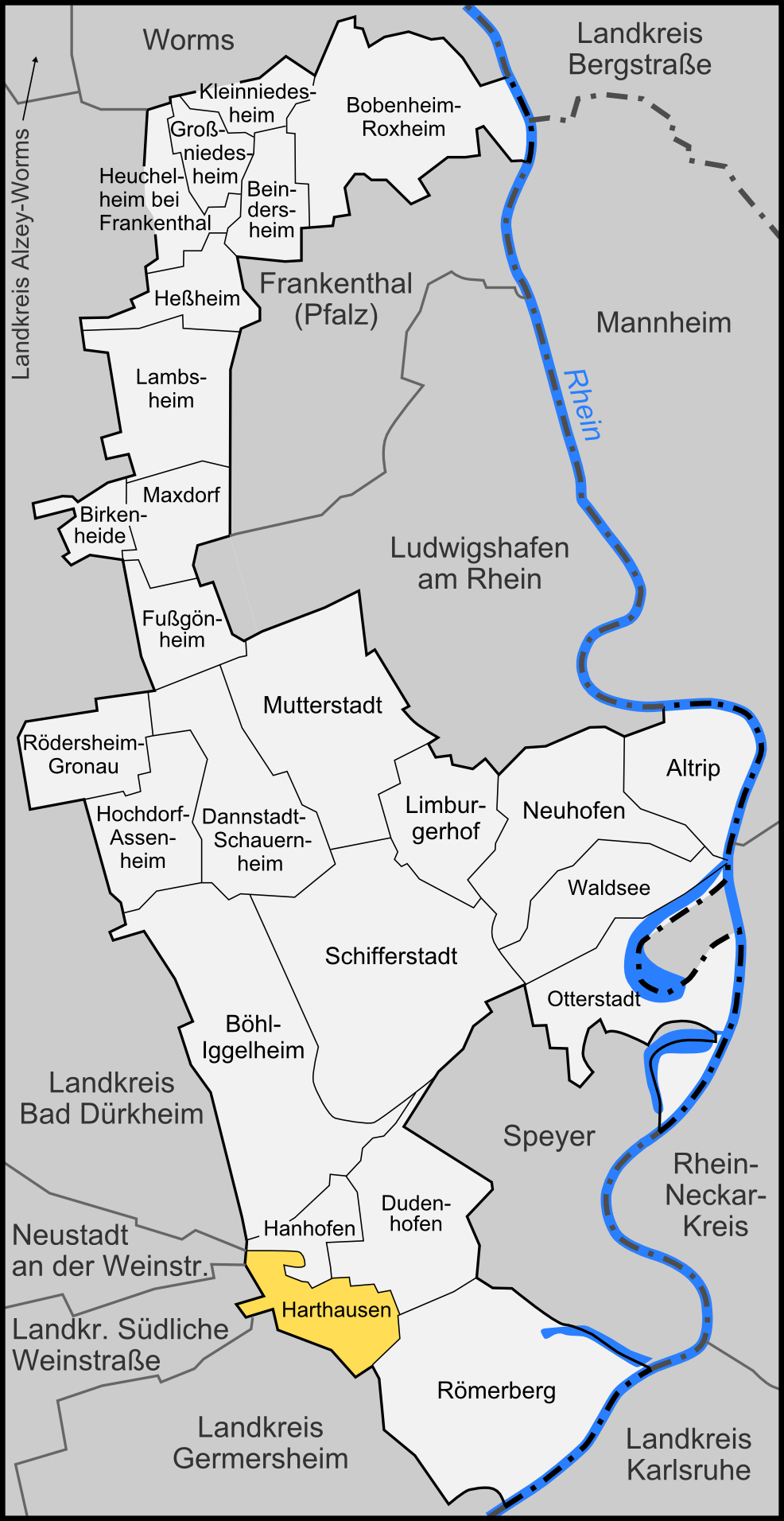
- Location of Harthausen within Rhein-Pfalz-Kreis district
- Interactive map of Harthausen
- Location within Germany Location within Rhineland-Palatinate
- Coordinates: 49°18′N 8°21′E
- Country: Germany
- State: Rhineland-Palatinate
- District: Rhein-Pfalz-Kreis
- Municipal assoc.: Römerberg-Dudenhofen

Government
  - Mayor (2019–24): Harald Löffler (CDU)

Area
  - Total: 8.37 km^{2} (3.23 sq mi)
- Elevation: 107 m (351 ft)

Population (2025-12-31)
  - Total: 3,253
  - Density: 389/km^{2} (1,010/sq mi)
- Time zone: UTC+01:00 (CET)
  - Summer (DST): UTC+02:00 (CEST)
- Postal codes: 67376
- Dialling codes: 06344
- Vehicle registration: RP
- Website: www.vgrd.de

Harthausen (German pronunciation: [haʁtˈhaʊzn̩]) is a municipality in the Rhein-Pfalz-Kreis, in Rhineland-Palatinate, Germany.
