= Hanhofen =

Municipality in Rhineland-Palatinate, Germany

- Municipality
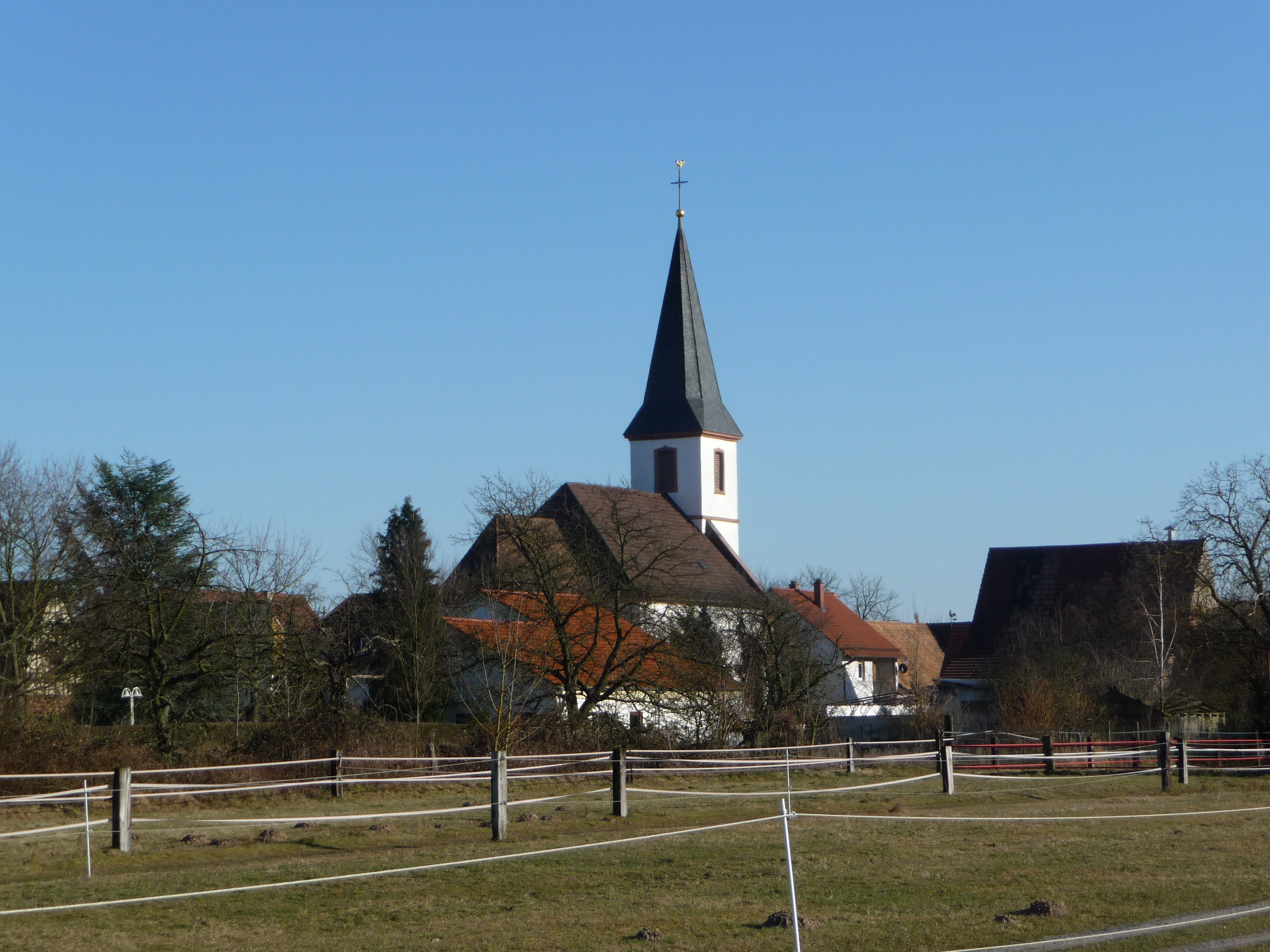
- Church of Saint Martin

- Coat of arms

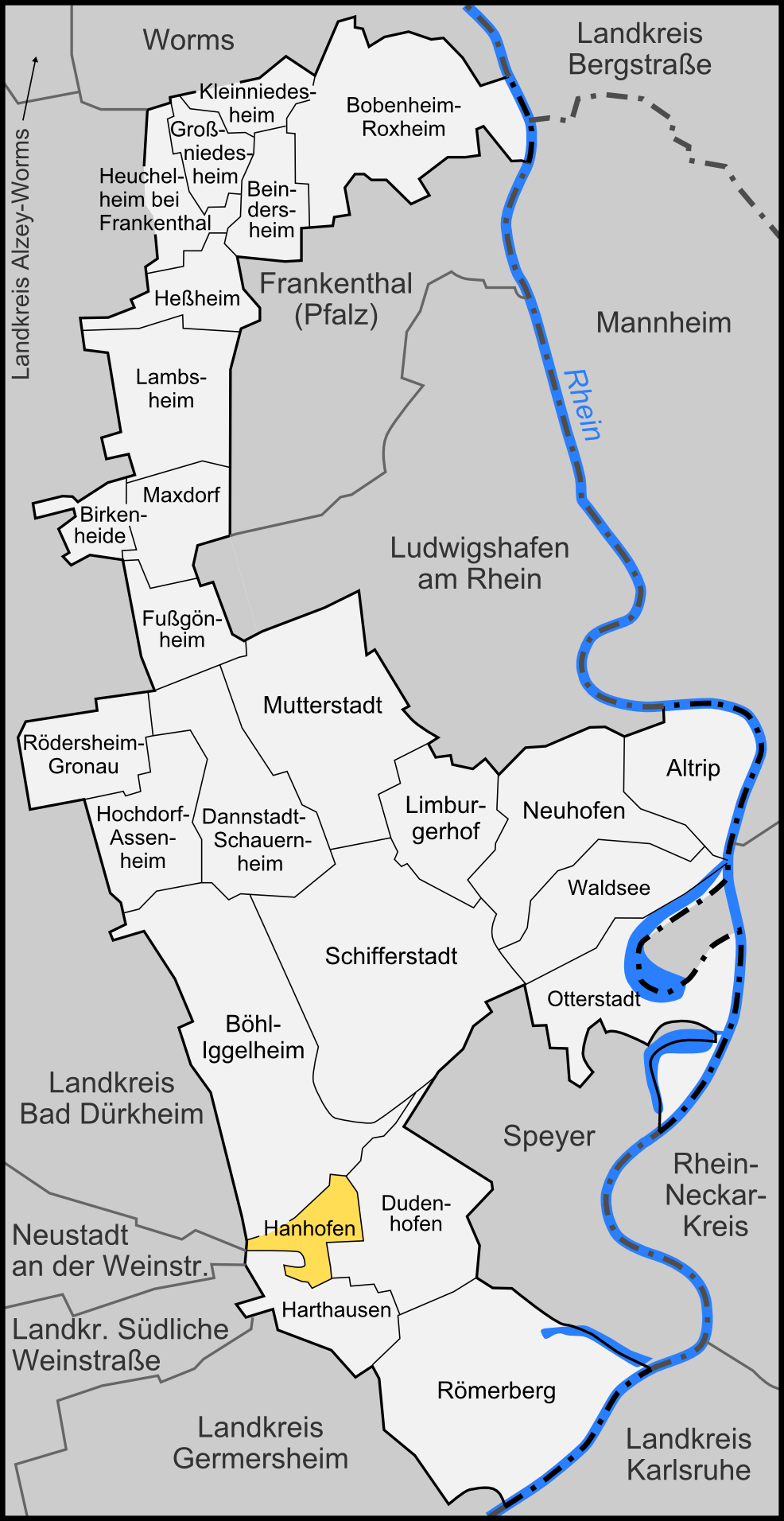
- Location of Hanhofen within Rhein-Pfalz-Kreis district
- Interactive map of Hanhofen
- Location within Germany Location within Rhineland-Palatinate
- Coordinates: 49°18′58″N 8°20′36″E
- Country: Germany
- State: Rhineland-Palatinate
- District: Rhein-Pfalz-Kreis
- Municipal assoc.: Römerberg-Dudenhofen
- Founded: 1156

Government
  - Mayor (2019–24): Silke Schmitt (SPD)

Area
  - Total: 5.80 km^{2} (2.24 sq mi)
- Elevation: 105 m (344 ft)

Population (2025-12-31)
  - Total: 2,573
  - Density: 444/km^{2} (1,150/sq mi)
- Time zone: UTC+01:00 (CET)
  - Summer (DST): UTC+02:00 (CEST)
- Postal codes: 67374
- Dialling codes: 06344
- Vehicle registration: RP
- Website: www.dudenhofen.de

Hanhofen is a municipality in the Rhein-Pfalz-Kreis, in Rhineland-Palatinate, Germany.

== Sister-city ==
- Kondoros, Hungary since 23 May 1998

== Literature ==
Armgart, Dr. Martin; et al. (2006). 850 Jahre Hanhofen 1156-2006. Streifzüge durch die Ortsgeschichte (in German). Ortsgemeinde Hanhofen. ISBN 3-00-017775-2.
