= Georg Gölter =

German politician (1938–2025)

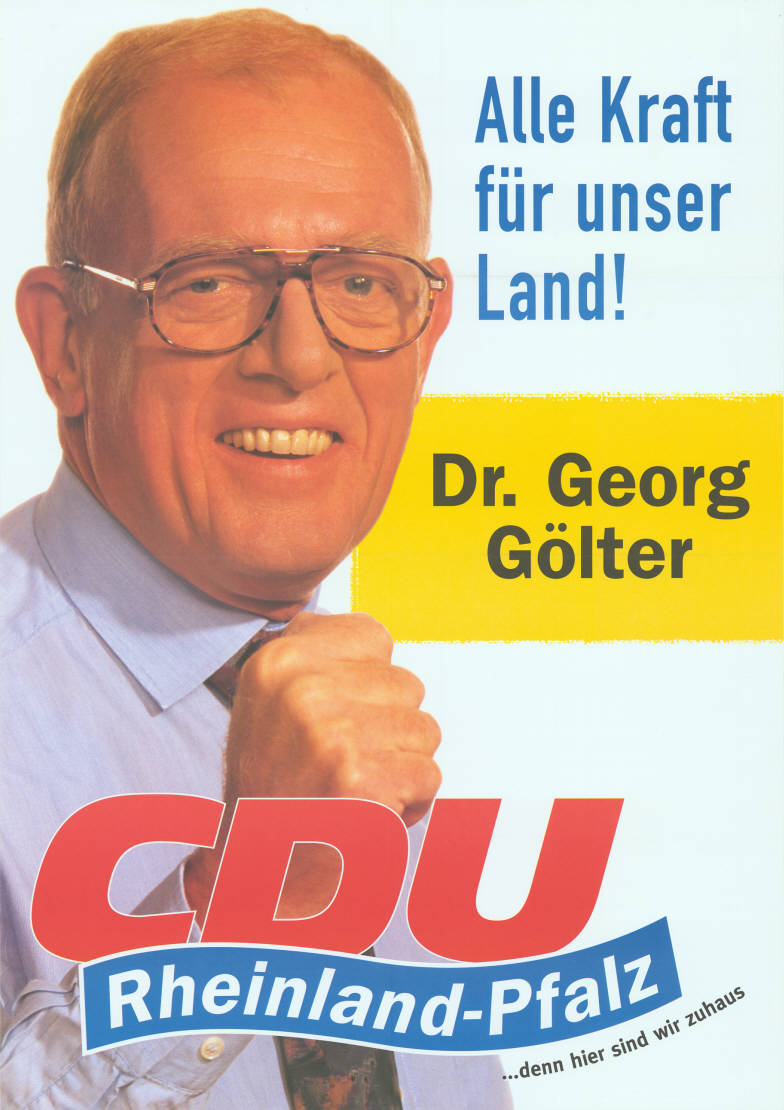
- 1996 campaign poster for Gölter

Member of the Bundestag
- In office 20 October 1969 – 8 July 1977

Personal details
- Born: 22 December 1938; Kaiserslautern, Gau Saar-Palatinate, Germany
- Died: 5 April 2025 (aged 86)
- Political party: CDU
- Education: University of Heidelberg; University of Tübingen
- Occupation: Schoolteacher

Georg Gölter (22 December 1938 – 5 April 2025) was a German politician. A member of the Christian Democratic Union, he served in the Bundestag from 1969 to 1977.

Gölter died on 5 April 2025, at the age of 86.
