= 1850 in music =

== Events ==
- August 28 (anniversary of Goethe's birth) – Richard Wagner's romantic opera Lohengrin (including the Bridal Chorus) premières under the direction of Franz Liszt at the Staatskapelle Weimar. Hans von Bülow attends and makes the decision to give up law and pursue music. His mother is convinced by two letters she receives from Liszt and Wagner.
- Jenny Lind tours America, with Julius Benedict as her accompanist.
- Soprano Wilhelmine Schröder-Devrient marries her third husband, landowner Heinrich von Bock.
- Charles Gounod meets the soprano Pauline Viardot in Rome. She convinces him to compose opera.
- Johannes Brahms meets the violinist Ede Reményi, whom he will accompany on several tours for the next couple of years.
- Wagner, under a pseudonym, writes an antisemitic article on "Jewishness in Music" in Neue Zeitschrift für Musik.
- Peek & Son piano manufacturing company is founded in New York City.

== Published popular music ==
- Stephen Foster
  - "Camptown Races"
  - "Ah! May the Red Rose Live Alway"
  - "Molly Do You Love Me?"
  - "Nelly Bly"
- M. S. Pike – "Home Again"
- "I Have Got The Blues To Day!" w. Miss Sarah M. Graham, m. Gustave Blessner
- "What Are The Wild Waves Saying" w. Joseph Edwards Carpenter m. Stephen Glover

== Classical music ==
- J S Bach – The Brandenburg Concertos published for the first time
- Hector Berlioz – La Fuite en Égypte (later incorporated into l'Enfance du Christ)
- Ernesto Cavallini – Elégie for clarinet and piano
- Carl Czerny – Album élégant des dames pianistes, Op. 804
- Louise Farrenc – Sonata for violin and piano in A, Op. 39
- Niels Gade – Symphony No. 4
- Ferdinand Hiller – 4 Gesänge, Op.41
- Édouard Lalo – Piano Trio no. 1 in C minor
- Franz Liszt
  - Prometheus
  - Consolations
  - Liebesträume
- Anton Rubinstein
  - Piano Concerto No. 1 in E minor, Op. 25
  - Dimitri Donskoy
- Camille Saint-Saëns - Symphony in A Major
- Robert Schumann – Symphony No. 3 op. 97 in E-flat, Cello Concerto Op. 129 in A minor
- Louis Spohr – String Quintet No. 7 in G minor (of 7)
- Johann Strauss Jr.
  - Kaiser Franz Josef Marsch, Op. 67
  - Aeols-Töne Walzer, Op. 68
  - Die Gemütlichen Walzer, Op. 70
  - Künstler-Quadrille, Op. 71
  - Scherz-Polka, Op. 72
  - Frohsinns-Spenden Walzer, Op. 73
  - Lava-Ströme Walzer, Op. 74
  - Sofien-Quadrille, Op. 75
  - Attaque-Quadrille, Op. 76
  - Wiener Garnison Marsch, Op. 77
  - Rendez-vous Polka, Op. 78
- Robert Volkmann – Piano Trio No. 2 op. 5 in B-flat minor

== Opera ==
- Daniel Auber – L'enfant prodigue
- Paul Wranitzky – La Tempesta
- Robert Schumann – Genoveva
- Richard Wagner – Lohengrin
- Nicola De Giosa – Don Checco

== Births ==
- January 4 – Max Kalbeck, librettist and music critic (died 1921)
- January 6 – Xaver Scharwenka, pianist and composer (d. 1924)
- January 13 – Leon Francis Victor Caron, French-Australian conductor and composer (d. 1907)
- February 18 – Sir George Henschel, Prussia-born singer, conductor, composer, founder of London Symphony Orchestra (d. 1934)
- March 5 – Daniel B. Towner, composer (d. 1919)
- March 9 – Alexandre Luigini, composer (d. 1906)
- March 18 – Olefine Moe, opera singer (d. 1933)
- March 19 – Elias Oechsler, composer (d. 1917)
- March 26 – Amalia Riégo, opera singer (d. 1926)
- April 25 – Luise Adolpha Le Beau, German composer (d. 1927)
- July 3 – Alfredo Keil, composer and painter (d. 1907)
- July 4 – Ole Olsen, Norwegian composer (d. 1927)
- July 5 – Aloÿs Claussmann, French organist (died 1926)
- September 9 – Leopoldo Miguez, composer (d. 1902)
- September 21 – Hans Sitt, German violinist, teacher and composer (d. 1922)
- November 10 – Arthur Thomas, composer (d. 1892)
- December 1 – Peter Erasmus Lange-Müller, Danish composer (d. 1926)
- December 9 – Emma Abbott, singer (d. 1891)
- December 13 – Iver Holter, conductor and composer (d. 1941)
- December 20 – Theo Marzials, composer, singer and poet (d. 1920)
- December 21 – Zdeněk Fibich, Czech composer (d. 1900)
- December 29 – Tomás Bretón, composer (d. 1923)

== Deaths ==
- February 15 – Elisabeth Forsselius, actress and singer (b. 1771)
- March 19 – Adalbert Gyrowetz, composer (b. 1763)
- March 25 – Francesco Basili, conductor and composer (b. 1767)
- April 3 – Václav Tomášek, pianist and composer (b. 1774)
- May – Ludwig Schuberth, composer (b. 1806)
- July 28 – Stefano Pavesi, composer (b. 1779)
- August 22 – Nikolaus Lenau, lyricist and poet (born 1802)
- October 12 – Luigia Boccabadati, operatic soprano (b. 1800)
- October 14 – Alexandrine-Caroline Branchu, operatic soprano (b. 1780)
- November 6 – Christopher Meineke, organist and composer (b. 1782)
- December 3 – Andrei Sychra, guitarist and composer (b. c. 1773)
