= Schuberth (surname) =

Schuberth is a German surnamre, a variant of Schubert, literally meaning "shoemaker". Notable people with the surname include:

- Christine Schuberth (born 1944), Austrian actress
- Emilio Schuberth, Italian fashion designer
- Hans Schuberth (1897–1976), German politician and engineer
- Karl Schuberth (1811–1863), German composer and cellist
- Ludwig Schuberth (1911-1989), Austrian handball player
- Ludwig Schuberth (composer), German composer
- Tom Schuberth, American basketball player and coach
- Walter Schuberth (born 1950), German footballer
