= Piano Concerto in E minor =

Piano Concerto in E minor may refer to:

- Piano Concerto No. 1 (Chopin)
- Piano Concerto No. 1 (Rubinstein)
- Piano Concerto No. 3 (Medtner)
