= Luca Jensen =

German footballer (born 1998)

Personal information
- Date of birth: 1 January 1998 (age 28)
- Place of birth: Kaiserslautern, Germany
- Height: 1.88 m (6 ft 2 in)
- Position: Midfielder

Team information
- Current team: Wormatia Worms
- Number: 25

Youth career
- –2007: SV Enkenbach
- 2007–2017: 1. FC Kaiserslautern

Senior career*
| Years | Team | Apps | (Gls) |
| 2017–2020 | 1. FC Kaiserslautern II | 65 | (3) |
| 2020–2021 | 1. FC Kaiserslautern | 3 | (0) |
| 2021–2022 | KFC Uerdingen 05 | 25 | (3) |
| 2022–2023 | Greifswalder FC | 22 | (0) |
| 2024– | Wormatia Worms | 15 | (1) |
- * Club domestic league appearances and goals as of 2 June 2024

Luca Jensen (born 1 January 1998) is a German professional footballer who plays as a midfielder for Wormatia Worms.

== Career ==
Jensen joined KFC Uerdingen 05 as a free agent in October 2021, following a trial.
