= Apollon Hussakovskyi =

Ukrainian composer, pianist, and chemist (1841–1875)

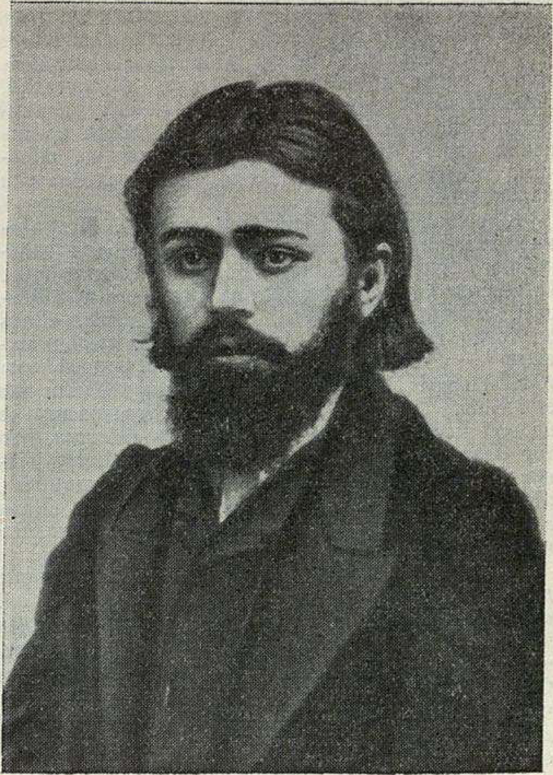
Apollon Hussakovskyi, author unknown

Apollon Seliverstovych Hussakovskyi (Ukrainian: Аполлон Селіверстович Гуссаковський; 1841 – 9 March [O.S. 25 February] 1875) was a Ukrainian composer, pianist, and soil chemist. He was close to the Mighty Handful group of composers, however later he abandoned his music career. He is also known by his Russian name Apollon Selivyorstovich Gussakovsky (Russian: Аполлон Селивёрстович Гуссаковский). Other sources give his birth and death years as 1843–1874 or 1841–1878.

== Life and career ==
Hussakovskyi was born in Okhtyrka. He moved to Saint Petersburg later on, attending the Second Saint Petersburg Gymnasium from 1856 to 1857. Mily Balakirev took on Hussakovskyi as a pupil in 1857 and introduced him to the other composers in his group, as well as Dmitry and Vladimir Stasov. Hussakovskyi took part in the meetings of the Mighty Handful.

The young composer faced financial challenges. Dmitry Stasov helped him find work, and he enrolled in university, yet later he lost his job. In 1859–1860 he lived with the Stasov and Zakharin brothers. Hussakovskyi composed prolifically during this time. In 1860, he composed and orchestrated the first movement of his symphony, an Allegro for orchestra named Let There Be Light (Да будет свет). Sketches also exist of the symphony finale. Balakirev highly praised the movement and organized a performance, even before the completion of the symphony. The movement was performed at a university concert on 15 January 1861 conducted by Karl Schuberth. It was later performed again on 20 November 1862 at a concert of the Russian Musical Society, conducted by Anton Rubinstein.

Hussakovskyi struggled to write more music and did not complete his symphony. He found a tutoring position within a wealthy family by May 1861, but left the country in late 1861 on a scientific assignment and returned in April 1862. Disillusioned with his abilities as a composer, Hussakovskyi met his friends less frequently upon returning. For some time, he lived in a tobacco shop. He married Olga Tilicheyeva in October, a decision which the other composers opposed.

Upon graduating from the Saint Petersburg Imperial University in November 1863, he was awarded the equivalent to a Candidate of Sciences and joined the Russian Appanage Department. From 1864 to 1867 he went abroad to inspect agricultural institutions. He began to teach in the Saint Petersburg Agricultural Institute in 1869. By 1871, Hussakovskyi had four daughters. His salary had not been enough for modest living conditions, and he wrote to Balakirev asking for loans. He tried to resume work on the symphony with Balakirev, however it was soon abandoned. Hussakovskyi often resorted to alcohol. He died on 9 March 1875 in Saint Petersburg and was buried in the Smolensky Cemetery.

== Music ==
Hussakovskyi's earliest known music was composed when he was in school. He composed most prolifically in 1857–1861, his period of creative activity only lasting around five to six years. More than fifty compositions by Hussakovskyi survive, though many are only sketches and drafts. The Mighty Handful highly regarded his talent. Most of Hussakovskyi's works are piano pieces written in the 1850s and 1860s, of which only a polka dating to 1854–1855 was published, dedicated to his mother Elena. Half of his piano pieces were scherzos. In an early scherzo the development clearly has influence from Balakirev's music (variational repetitions and a sixteen-bar pedal point). He also wrote other piano pieces, which includes an Andante in F major written in April 1862 for his then-fiancée. Hussakovskyi used simple and clear harmonic language in his works, and in the scherzos for three and four hands he uses impulsive musical language, juxtaposition of piano registers, and variational repetition. A sketch of a fugue for piano exists.

The composer also wrote a symphony sonata for orchestra, the Foolish Scherzo for string quartet, music for Goethe's Faust, and sketches of the vocal-instrumental piece Boyarin Orsha (based on the poem of the same name by Mikhail Lermontov).
