= Bobenheim-Roxheim =

Municipality in Rhineland-Palatinate, Germany

- Municipality
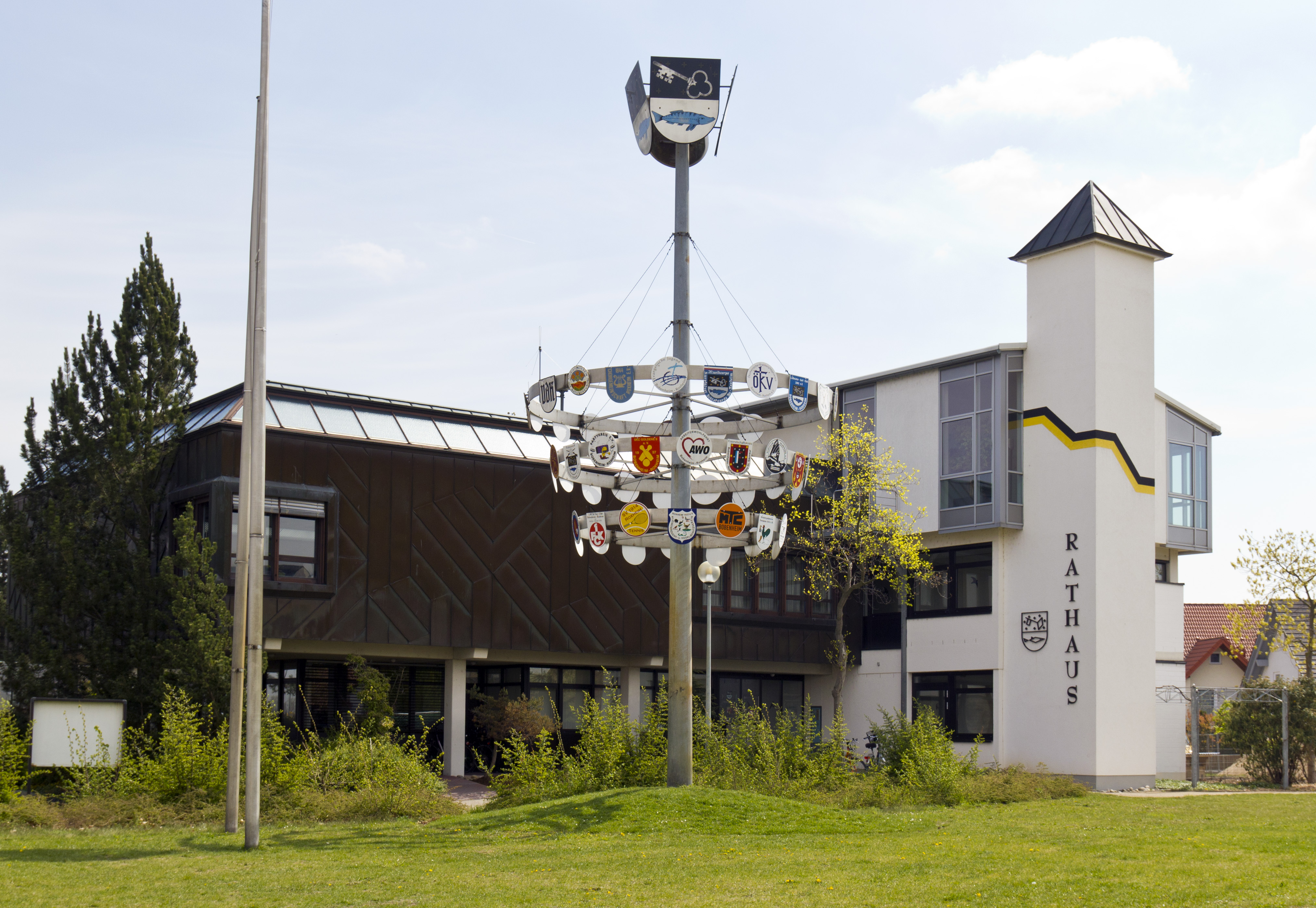
- Town hall

- Coat of arms

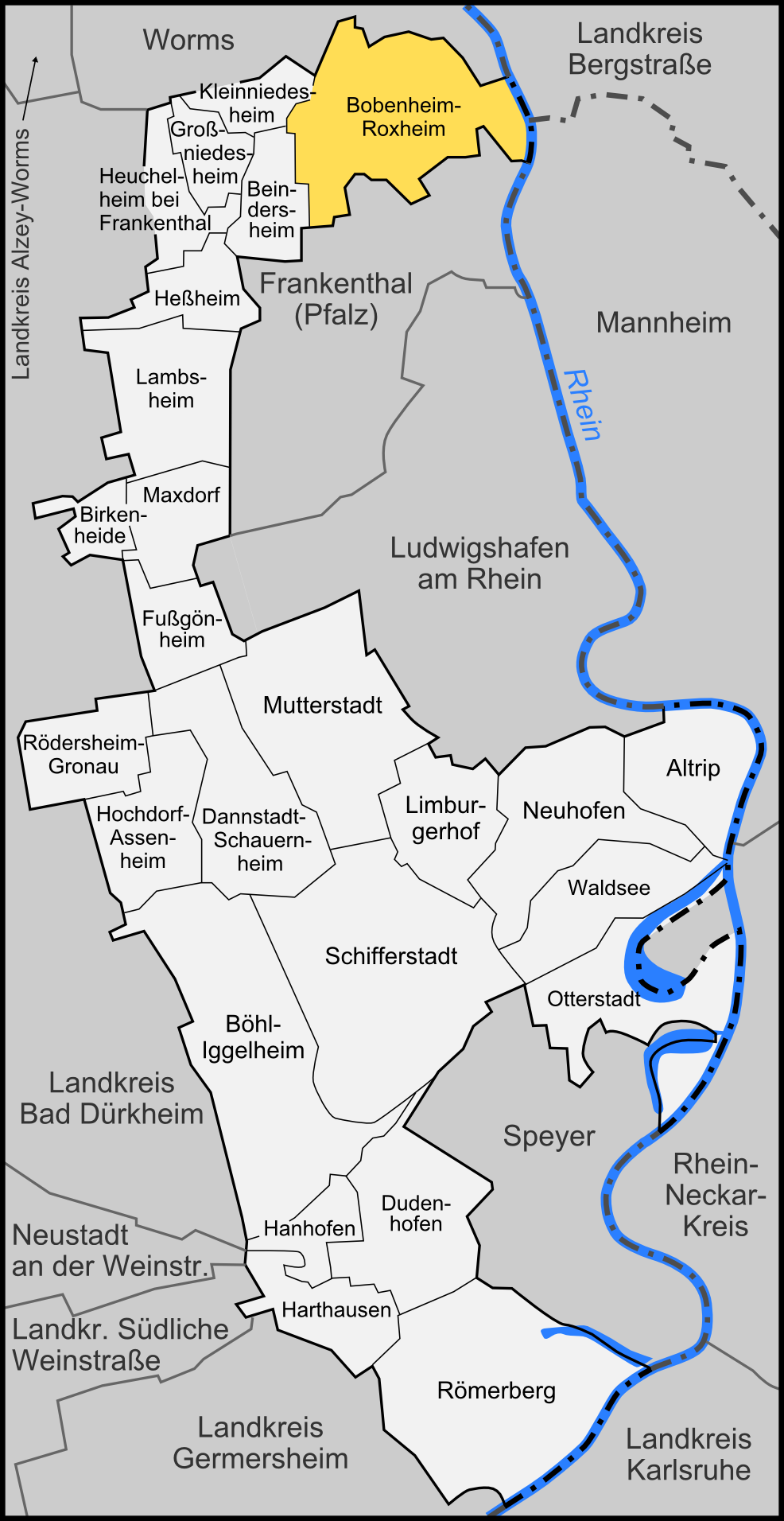
- Location of Bobenheim-Roxheim within Rhein-Pfalz-Kreis district
- Interactive map of Bobenheim-Roxheim
- Location within Germany Location within Rhineland-Palatinate
- Coordinates: 49°35′N 8°21′E
- Country: Germany
- State: Rhineland-Palatinate
- District: Rhein-Pfalz-Kreis

Government
  - Mayor (2021–29): Michael Georg Müller (SPD)

Area
  - Total: 20.51 km^{2} (7.92 sq mi)
- Elevation: 94 m (308 ft)

Population (2025-12-31)
  - Total: 10,103
  - Density: 492.6/km^{2} (1,276/sq mi)
- Time zone: UTC+01:00 (CET)
  - Summer (DST): UTC+02:00 (CEST)
- Postal codes: 67240
- Dialling codes: 06239
- Vehicle registration: RP
- Website: www.bobenheim-roxheim.de

Bobenheim-Roxheim (German pronunciation: [ˈboːbn̩haɪm ˈʁɔkshaɪm]) is a municipality in the Rhein-Pfalz-Kreis, in Rhineland-Palatinate, Germany. It is situated approximately 5 km south of Worms, and 13 km northwest of Ludwigshafen. It is mentioned in the wall-building ordinance of Worms (Wormser Mauerbauordnung) from around 900 as one of the places that shared responsibility for maintaining the city wall of Worms.

The people who worked in Bobenheim-Roxheim include Franziskus von Bettinger, Harald Braner and Albert Friedrich Speer.
