= Reichenberger =

Surname

Reichenberger is a surname. Notable people with the name include:

- Hugo Reichenberger (1873–1938), German conductor and composer
- Max Reichenberger (born 1948), German football defender and manager
- Thomas Reichenberger (born 1974). German former professional footballer
