= Tom Eilers =

German football official (born 1970)

Tom Eilers (born 17 March 1970) is a German football official and former goalkeeper. The lawyer is a member of the Executive Committee of SV Darmstadt 98.

== Career as a footballer ==
Eilers was born in Darmstadt. From 1991 to 1993 he played in goal for 2. Bundesliga team Darmstadt 98 in 48 second division games. In 1993 he moved to league rivals Mainz 05. As a backup goalkeeper behind Manfred Petz and Stephan Kuhnert, he played eight times in two seasons for Mainz in the 2. Bundesliga, and twice in the DFB-Pokal. In 1995 he returned to Darmstadt 98, which had meanwhile been relegated to the Regionalliga, and ended his career as a footballer in 2001.

== Professional career ==
Eilers is a son of the long-time legal advisor of the German Football Association, Goetz Eilers. From 1989 to 1991 he completed an apprenticeship as a banker and then began studying law at the Goethe University Frankfurt, which he continued in 1993 – when he moved to 1. FSV Mainz 05 – at the University of Mainz. After graduating, he was admitted to the bar in 2001 and has worked in various law firms ever since. From November 2006 to June 2010 he was sports manager at Darmstadt 98. Since July 2014 he has been an appointed member of the Executive Committee responsible for matters relating to licensed players.
