= Bernd Fischer (football coach) =

German football coach (born 1939)

Personal information
- Date of birth: 10 March 1939
- Place of birth: Germany
- Date of death: 4 June 2025 (aged 86)

Managerial career
- Years: Team
- 1979–1980: Wormatia Worms
- 1980–1981: Indonesia

Bernd Fischer (10 March 1939 – 4 June 2025) was a German football manager who coached Wormatia Worms and Indonesia national team.

Fischer died on 4 June 2025, at the age of 86.
