= Kristjan Glibo =

German footballer and manager

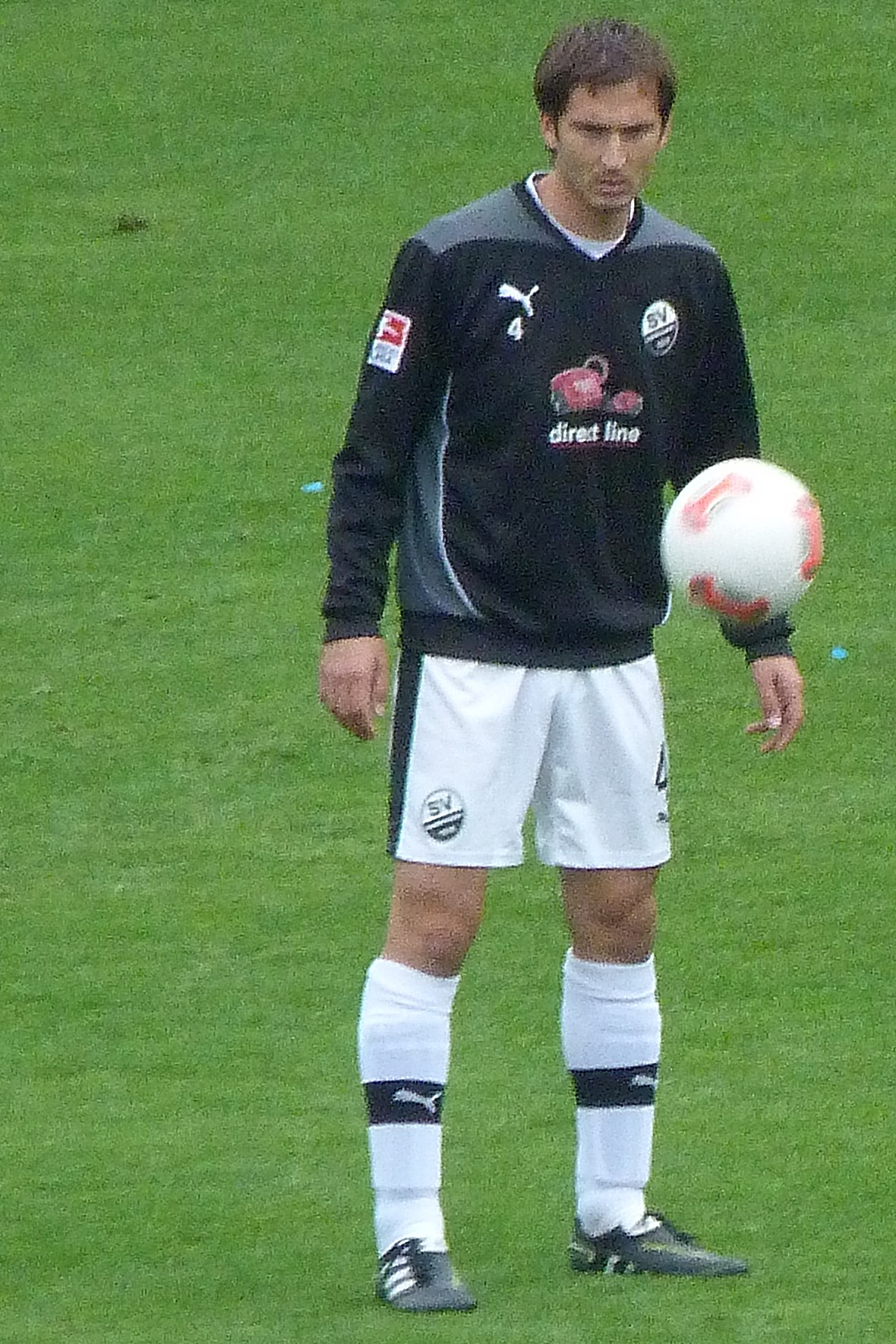
- Gilbo as player of SV Sandhausen in 2012

Personal information
- Date of birth: 1 April 1982 (age 44)
- Place of birth: Bruchsal, West Germany
- Height: 1.87 m (6 ft 2 in)
- Positions: Defender; defensive midfielder

Youth career
- 1985–1992: 1. FC Bruchsal
- 1982–1995: 1. FC Forst
- 1985–1999: Karlsruher SC
- 1999–2001: 1. FC Kaiserslautern

Senior career*
Years	Team	Apps	(Gls)
2001–2004	1. FC Kaiserslautern II	74	(2)
2003–2004	1. FC Kaiserslautern	2	(0)
2004–2006	Jahn Regensburg	54	(3)
2006–2009	SV Wehen Wiesbaden	75	(3)
2006–2009	SV Wehen Wiesbaden II	2	(0)
2010–2013	SV Sandhausen	52	(3)
Total		259	(11)

Managerial career
- 2013–2019: SV Sandhausen II
- 2019–2022: Wormatia Worms
- 2022–2025: Eintracht Frankfurt II
- 2025–2026: Kickers Offenbach
- * Club domestic league appearances and goals

Kristjan Glibo (born 1 April 1982 in Bruchsal) is a German football manager and former player who manages VfR Wormatia Worms. He played as a defender or defensive midfielder.

== Personal life ==
Glibo also has Albanian Origins from Lezhë
