= Bernd Hoss =

German football manager

Personal information
- Full name: Bernd Hoss
- Date of birth: 19 June 1939
- Place of birth: Neckarhausen, Germany
- Date of death: 6 April 2016 (aged 76)
- Place of death: Freiburg im Breisgau, Germany
- Height: 1.82 m (6 ft 0 in)

Managerial career
- Years: Team
- 1969–1971: FV Ebingen
- 1971–1974: Mainz 05
- 1974–1976: FK Pirmasens
- 1976–1977: Wormatia Worms
- 1977: Karlsruher SC
- 1978–1979: Wuppertaler SV
- 1980–1981: Freiburger FC
- 1981: VfL Osnabrück
- 1983–1984: Tennis Borussia Berlin
- 1984–1989: SpVgg Blau-Weiß 1890 Berlin
- 1989–1990: SC Freiburg

Bernd Hoss (19 June 1939 – 6 April 2016) was a German football manager.

Hoss managed 34 games for SpVgg Blau-Weiß 1890 Berlin in the Bundesliga during his career.
