= Horst-Dieter Strich =

German footballer

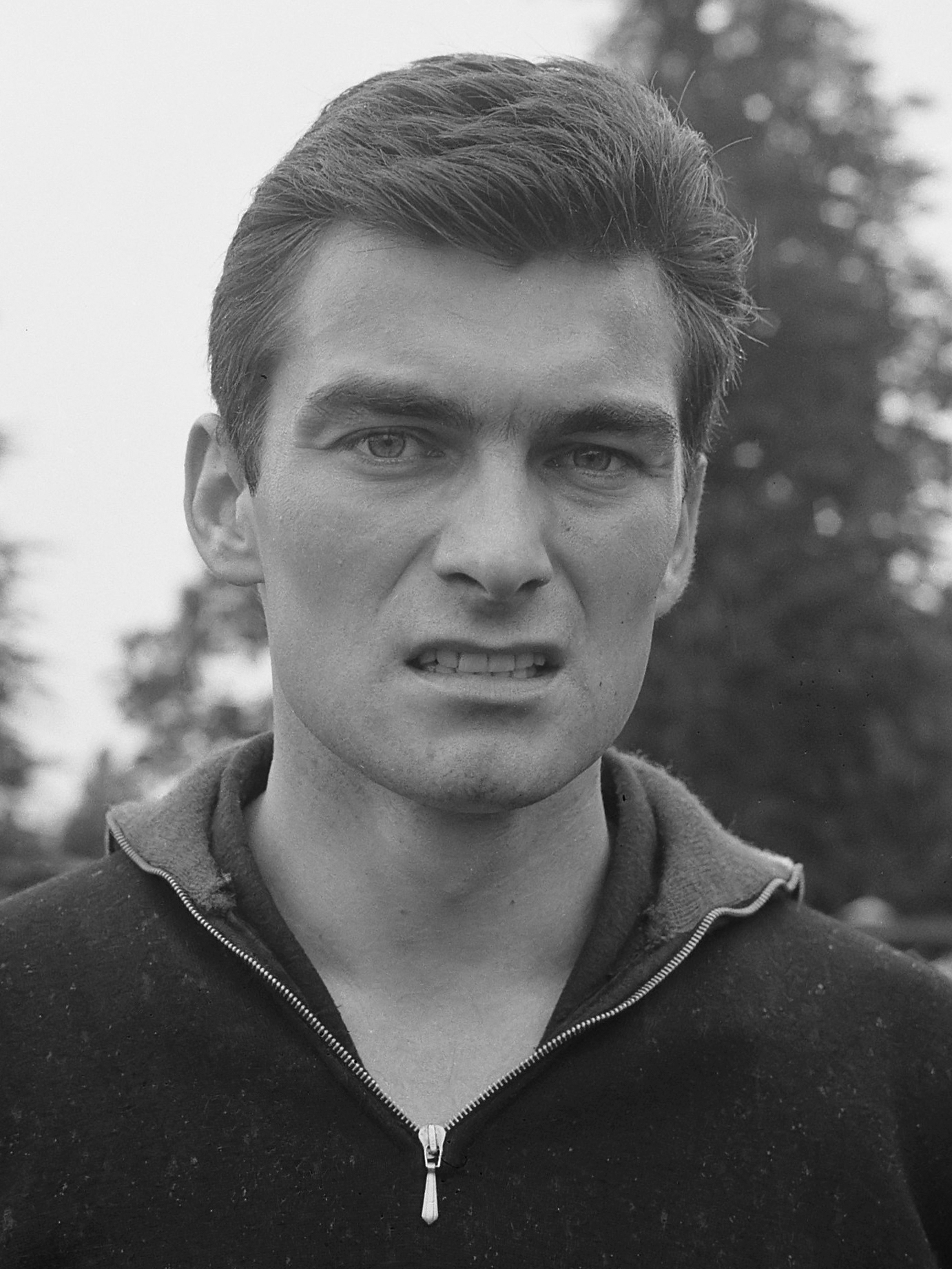
- Strich in 1965

Personal information
- Date of birth: 8 April 1941
- Place of birth: Berlin, Germany
- Height: 1.80 m (5 ft 11 in)
- Position: Goalkeeper

Senior career*
Years	Team	Apps	(Gls)
1960–1962	Wormatia Worms		
1962–1963	Mainz 05		
1963–1965	1. FC Kaiserslautern		
1965–1966	PSV Eindhoven		
1966–1967	1. FC Nürnberg		
1967–1971	FC Bayern Hof		
1971–1972	Wormatia Worms		

Managerial career
- 1981: Wormatia Worms
- 1984–1988: Mainz 05
- * Club domestic league appearances and goals

Horst-Dieter Strich (born 8 April 1941) is a German former football player and manager who played as a goalkeeper.
