= Curtis Booth =

English footballer and manager

Personal information
- Full name: Curtis Booth
- Date of birth: 12 October 1891
- Place of birth: Gateshead, England
- Date of death: 29 October 1949 (aged 58)
- Place of death: Amsterdam, Netherlands
- Height: 5 ft 11 in (1.80 m)
- Position: Inside left

Senior career*
Years	Team	Apps	(Gls)
- Wallsend Elm Villa
1913–1920	Newcastle United	34	(6)
- → Leeds City (guest)
1920–1923	Norwich City	62	(11)
1923–1924	Accrington Stanley	1	(0)

Managerial career
- 1923–1924: Accrington Stanley
- 1932–1934: Wormatia Worms
- 1934–1935: RC Paris
- Al Ahly
- * Club domestic league appearances and goals

Curtis Booth (12 October 1891 – 29 October 1949), sometimes known as Tommy Booth, was an English football player and manager. He played in the Football League for Newcastle United, Norwich City and Accrington Stanley, for Leeds City as a wartime guest and for Wallsend Elm Villa. After retiring as a player, Booth managed Accrington Stanley, Wormatia Worms, RC Paris and coached in Germany, Turkey and the Netherlands.

== Personal life ==
Booth enlisted in the British Army in December 1915 to fight in the First World War. He served as a private in the Durham Light Infantry and saw action on the Somme and at the Third Ypres. Booth was wounded in action at Villers-Bretonneux in August 1918 and was demobilized in August 1919.

== Career statistics ==
Appearances and goals by club, season and competition
Club	Season	League			FA Cup		Total	
Club	Season	Division	Apps	Goals	Apps	Goals	Apps	Goals
Newcastle United	1914–15	First Division	19	2	0	0	19	2
Newcastle United	1919–20	First Division	15	4	0	0	15	4
Newcastle United	Total		34	6	0	0	34	6
Norwich City	1920–21	Third Division	22	4	0	0	22	4
Norwich City	1921–22	Third Division South	21	5	0	0	21	5
Norwich City	1922–23	Third Division South	19	2	3	2	22	3
Norwich City	Total		62	11	3	2	65	13
Accrington Stanley	1923–24	Third Division North	1	0	2	1	3	1
Career total			97	17	5	3	102	20
