= SpVgg Ingelheim =

Football club in Ingelheim am Rhein, Germany

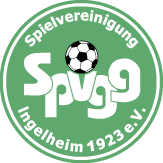
- Full name: Spielvereinigung Ingelheim 1923 e. V.
- Nickname: SpVgg Ingelheim
- Founded: 15 April 1923
- Ground: Stadion Blumengarten
- Capacity: 4,000
- Chairman: Arnold Pieper
- Manager: Matthias Güldener
- League: Landesliga
- 2022–23: 11th
Home colours	Away colours

SpVgg Ingelheim (officially: Spielvereinigung Ingelheim 1923 e. V.) is a football club from Ingelheim am Rhein, Rhineland-Palatinate, Germany. The club's first team played four seasons in the then fourth-tier Oberliga Südwest.

== History ==
On 15 December 1913, the FC Schwarze Elf Nieder-Ingelheim was founded, which is the origin of today's club. In 1919, the club's name was changed to SV Schwarze Elf Nieder-Ingelheim and on 14 November 1924 to 1. Ingelheimer SV. On 15 April 1923, the SpVgg Ober-Ingelheim was founded, which merged with the Schwarze Elf from Nieder-Ingelheim on 17 January 1935 to form the SpVgg 1913/23 Ingelheim. Around 1937, the club's name was shortened to SpVgg 1923 Ingelheim. With the end of World War II, the club was dissolved and re-established on 13 July 1946.

=== Football ===
The club was one of the founding members of the Amateurliga Rheinhessen in 1947 and won the championship two years later. However, in the subsequent promotion round to the Oberliga Südwest, they finished last. In 1954, the team became runners-up in the Amateurliga Südwest and participated in the German Amateur Championship, where they lost the decisive match for group victory against Spvgg. 03 Neu-Isenburg 0-2. Three years later, Ingelheim was relegated and had to accept relegation from the 2. Amateurliga in 1961.

The promotion did not succeed until 1968. After a series of runner-up finishes, SpVgg returned to the now Verbandsliga Südwest, the highest regional league, in 1985. The relegation in 1997 could be compensated immediately, and in 2001 the promotion to the Oberliga Südwest followed. There, SpVgg reached its sporting zenith with a 9th place finish in the 2002/03 season. Two years later, however, relegation followed due to a worse goal difference compared to SpVgg EGC Wirges. In the following ten years, Ingelheim played in the Verbandsliga Südwest, before they had to accept another relegation to the Landesliga after the 2015/16 season and were relegated to the Bezirksliga in 2017. Meanwhile, Spielvereinigung Ingelheim is playing in the Landesliga again.

=== Futsal ===
The futsal team of SpVgg Ingelheim participated in the DFB Futsal Cup in 2008 and 2009, but did not get beyond the group stage in either event.

== Notable players ==
- Holger Greilich
- Marco Grevelhörster
- Horst Hülß
- Manfred Petz
- Max Reichenberger
- Michael Schuhmacher
