= Josef Stabel =

German footballer

Personal information
- Date of birth: 21 September 1948 (age 78)
- Position: Goalkeeper

Senior career*
Years	Team	Apps	(Gls)
1967–1980	1. FC Kaiserslautern		

Managerial career
- 1980–1981: 1. FC Kaiserslautern (assistant)
- 1981–1983: Wormatia Worms
- 1983–1987: TuS Hohenecken
- 1987: 1. FC Kaiserslautern II
- 1987–1989: 1. FC Kaiserslautern
- 1989–1990: FC 08 Homburg
- 1991–1992: FK Pirmasens
- 1992–1994: TuS Hohenecken
- * Club domestic league appearances and goals

Josef Stabel (born 21 September 1948) is a retired German football goalkeeper and later manager.
