= Maximilian Mehring =

German footballer

Max Mehring
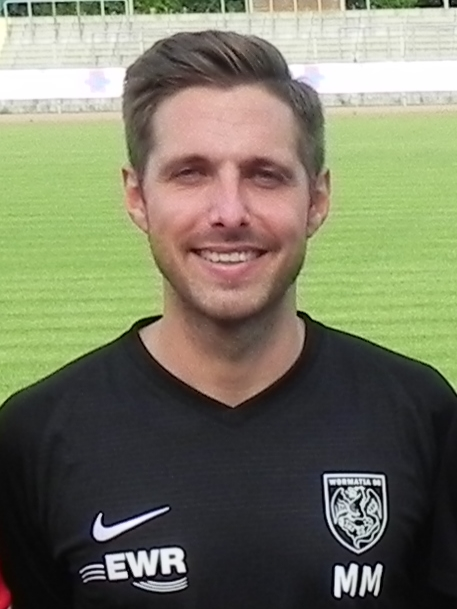

Personal information
- Full name: Maximilian Mehring
- Date of birth: 15 April 1986 (age 40)
- Place of birth: Worms, West Germany
- Height: 1.78 m (5 ft 10 in)
- Position: Midfielder

Youth career
- 1994–1997: FSV 03 Osthofen
- 1997–2000: SV Horchheim
- 2000–2002: Ludwigshafener SC
- 2002–2005: SC Freiburg

Senior career*
Years	Team	Apps	(Gls)
2005–2009	SC Freiburg II	87	(21)
2008–2009	SC Freiburg	3	(0)
2009–2010	Darmstadt 98	23	(2)
2010–2012	Eintracht Frankfurt II	49	(7)
2013–2015	Wormatia Worms	13	(2)
Total		175	(32)
- * Club domestic league appearances and goals

Maximilian Mehring (born 15 April 1986) is a German former professional footballer who played as a midfielder.

== Career ==
Mehring was born in Worms. He began his career with FSV 03 Osthofen before joining SV Horchheim in the summer of 1997. After a successful spell with SV Horchheim he moved to Ludwigshafener SC in 2000 and then SC Freiburg in 2002. In 2005, he was promoted to the club's reserve team and on 18 June 2007 he signed his first professional contract. He made his first-team debut in September 2008 as a substitute in a 3–1 win against FC Augsburg. In May 2009 he left SC Freiburg after eight years at the club.
