= Peter Rubeck =

German footballer

Personal information
- Date of birth: 28 December 1961
- Position: Midfielder

Senior career*
Years	Team	Apps	(Gls)
1979–1981	1. FC Saarbrücken		
1981–1982	FC Homburg		
1982–1983	Eintracht Trier		
1983–1984	Borussia Neunkirchen		
1984–1989	Eintracht Trier		
1989–1990	FC Bayern Alzenau		

Managerial career
- 1998–2001: FC Homburg
- 2001–2002: Wormatia Worms
- 2002–2004: SV Weingarten
- 2004–2005: SG Perl-Besch
- 2006–2007: TuS Hohenecken
- 2007–2014: Niederauerbach/Zweibrücken
- 2014–2016: Eintracht Trier
- 2016–2017: SC Hauenstein
- 2017: FSV Salmrohr
- 2018–2021: SG Ballweiler-Wecklingen
- 2021–2022: TSC Zweibrücken
- 2022: Borussia Neunkirchen
- * Club domestic league appearances and goals

Peter Rubeck (born 28 December 1961) is a German former professional footballer who played as a midfielder.
