= Horst Hülß =

German footballer (1938–2022)

Personal information
- Date of birth: 5 September 1938
- Place of birth: Rossach, Bavaria, Germany
- Date of death: 7 October 2022 (aged 84)
- Place of death: Mainz, Rhineland-Palatinate, Germany
- Position: Midfielder

Senior career*
Years	Team	Apps	(Gls)
1959–1965	Viktoria Köln		
1965–1968	Mainz 05		
1968–1969	VfB Ginsheim		

Managerial career
- 1968–1969: VfB Ginsheim (player-manager)
- 1969–1970: SV Weisenau
- 1970–1972: VfB Ginsheim
- 1975–1980: Mainz 05
- 1980–1981: Hassia Bingen
- 1982–1983: SV Wiesbaden
- 1985–1988: SV Wehen
- 1988–1989: Mainz 05
- 1989–1991: SpVgg Ingelheim
- 1991–1997: SG Walluf
- 1999–2000: SG Walluf
- * Club domestic league appearances and goals

Horst Hülß (5 September 1938 – 7 October 2022) was a German football player and manager who played as a midfielder.

== Career ==
Hülß came to Cologne in 1959 from his home in the Coburg district, where he had played for TSV Rossach, to study sports, geography and chemistry. Here he played at this time together with Erich Ribbeck and Gero Bisanz at SC Viktoria Köln under Hennes Weisweiler in the top division, the Oberliga West, and from 1963 in the Regionalliga West, and then second division after the introduction of the Bundesliga. As the "foster son" of the master coach, he obtained his coaching license at the sports academy in 1962. The midfield director left Cologne in 1965 as a contract player for 1. FSV Mainz 05 in the Southwest Regionalliga. In his first league game, the playmaker scored his first of six goals of the season. He played with the '05s until 1968; during this time the team reached the end of the season once in third place, twice in fourth place. At the age of 30, he then went to VfB Ginsheim as a player-coach.

A year later, he became coach of SV Weisenau in the regional league and returned to VfB Ginsheim for two years after one season. The high school teacher went back to Mainz via the VfR Nierstein station, where he took over as head coach from Gerd Menne after the winter break of the 1975/76 season. Although he and his team finished twelfth at the end of the season, the club renounced the second division license for financial reasons and went back to the Amateurliga Südwest. Hülß built a new team that reached the championship in 1978 but had to bow to Borussia Neunkirchen and TuS Neuendorf in the relegation round. Hülß stayed with FSV until 1980, then switched to Hassia Bingen, whom he led to the Southwest Cup, as he had done for Mainz three times before. From there he went to SV Wiesbaden, with whom he became state league champion, and then to FVgg Kastel. He then looked after SV Wehen for three years, which he brought from the A-class to the state league.

After winning the Hessen Cup with the Taunussteiners in 1988, he went to Mainz 05 for a second period as coach in the 1988/89 season dismissed. Hülß later coached various lower-class clubs, including SG Walluf, with which he was promoted to the Oberliga in 2000, but was relegated again in 2002. From 1996 to 2012, the now retired director of studies at the Mainz Schlossgymnasium was press officer for the Association of German Football Teachers.

He was assessor of the DFB sports court.

Hülß died in Main on 7 October 2022.

== Stations ==
=== As a player ===
- TSV Rossach (until 1959)
- SC Viktoria Köln (1959-1965)
- 1. FSV Mainz 05 (1965–1968)
- VfB Ginsheim (1968/69) (player-coach)

=== As a coach ===
- SV Weisenau (1969/70)
- VfB Ginsheim (1970–1972)
- VfR Nierstein (1973–1975)
- 1. FSV Mainz 05 (1976–1980)
- Hassia Bingen (1980/81)
- SV Wiesbaden (1982/83)
- FVgg Kastel (1984
- SV Wehen (1985–1988)
- 1. FSV Mainz 05 (1988/89)
- Viktoria Sindlingen (1989)
- SpVgg Ingelheim (1989–1991)
- SG Walluf (1991–1997)
- SV Italia Wiesbaden (1997/98)
- SG Walluf (1999–?)

== Honours ==
- Südwestpokal winner 1977, 1979, 1980 (with Mainz 05), 1981 (with Hassia Bingen)
- Hessen Cup winner 1988 (with SV Wehen)
- Southwest amateur champion 1978 (with Mainz 05)

== Releases ==
- Rainer Schliermann/Horst Hülß, mental training in soccer. A handbook for coaches, trainers and physical education teachers. Verlag Feldhaus, 2008, ISBN 978-3-88020-501-7
