= Stefano Maier =

German footballer

Personal information
- Date of birth: 4 December 1992 (age 33)
- Place of birth: Offenbach am Main, Germany
- Height: 1.89 m (6 ft 2 in)
- Position: Centre back

Team information
- Current team: Wormatia Worms
- Number: 5

Youth career
- –2005: Eintracht Frankfurt
- 2005–2011: Kickers Offenbach

Senior career*
Years	Team	Apps	(Gls)
2011–2018	Kickers Offenbach	133	(4)
2018–2019	Viktoria Köln	17	(1)
2019–2022	FC 08 Homburg	63	(4)
2023–	Wormatia Worms	8	(1)
- * Club domestic league appearances and goals as of 2 June 2024

Stefano Maier (born 4 December 1992) is a German footballer who plays for Wormatia Worms. He made his 3. Liga debut for the club in October 2011, as a substitute for Kai Hesse in a 2–1 home win over Jahn Regensburg.
