= Radoslav Momirski =

Yugoslav football manager (1919–2007)

Personal information
- Date of birth: 4 September 1919
- Place of birth: Novi Sad, Kingdom of Serbs, Croats and Slovenes
- Date of death: 12 February 2007 (aged 87)
- Place of death: Augsburg, Germany

Managerial career
- Years: Team
- 1950–1951: Bergisch Gladbach 09
- 1952–1953: VfR Mannheim
- 1953: 1. FC Saarbrücken
- 1954–1955: Meidericher SV
- 1956–1958: TuS Derschlag
- 1959–1960: SSV Troisdorf 05
- 1960–1961: Vojvodina
- 1961–1964: Wormatia Worms
- 1964–1965: Kickers Offenbach
- 1965–1966: Schwaben Augsburg
- 1967–1968: Darmstadt 98
- 1968–1970: VfL Osnabrück
- 1971–1972: SV Röchling Völklingen
- 1972: FC Homburg
- 1972–1974: Wormatia Worms
- 1976: Bayer Leverkusen
- 1976–1978: VfL Wolfsburg
- 1978–1979: VfL Osnabrück

Radoslav Momirski (Serbian Cyrillic: Радослав Момирски; 4 September 1919 – 12 February 2007) was a Yugoslav football manager.

== Managerial career ==
Momirski spent most of his managerial career in Germany. He was in charge of numerous clubs, including 1. FC Saarbrücken, Meidericher SV, Wormatia Worms (twice), Kickers Offenbach, Darmstadt 98, VfL Osnabrück (twice), FC Homburg, Bayer Leverkusen, and VfL Wolfsburg. In addition, Momirski served as manager of Yugoslav First League side Vojvodina in the 1960–61 season.
