= Sandro Loechelt =

German footballer

Personal information
- Date of birth: 24 August 1995 (age 31)
- Place of birth: Kirchheimbolanden, Germany
- Height: 1.68 m (5 ft 6 in)
- Position: Midfielder

Team information
- Current team: Wormatia Worms
- Number: 17

Youth career
- –2011: 1. FC Kaiserslautern
- 2011–2014: Wormatia Worms

Senior career*
Years	Team	Apps	(Gls)
2014–2017	Wormatia Worms	87	(7)
2017–2019	Mainz 05 II	43	(4)
2019–2020	Waldhof Mannheim	1	(0)
2020–	Wormatia Worms	76	(12)
- * Club domestic league appearances and goals as of 1 May 2024

Sandro Loechelt (born 24 August 1995) is a German footballer who plays for Wormatia Worms as a midfielder.
