= Fritz Schollmeyer =

German football manager

Personal information
- Full name: Fritz Schollmeyer
- Date of birth: 19 June 1922
- Place of birth: Germany

Managerial career
- Years: Team
- 1960–1963: SV Arminia Hannover
- 1964–1967: BC Augsburg
- 1967–1968: OSC Bremerhaven
- 1968: Bonner SC
- 1969: TuS Celle FC
- 1970: Wormatia Worms
- 1970–1971: SSV Ulm 1846
- 1971–1972: Tennis Borussia Berlin
- 1975: VfL Wolfsburg
- 1976: K. Beringen F.C.

Fritz Schollmeyer (born 19 June 1922) is a German former football manager.
