= Nándor Lengyel =

Hungarian football manager

Personal information
- Full name: Nándor Lengyel
- Date of birth: 6 June 1914
- Date of death: 9 January 1968 (aged 53)

Managerial career
- Years: Team
- 1955–1959: Luxembourg
- 1959–1960: Schalke 04
- 1960–1964: Rot-Weiß Oberhausen
- 1964–1965: Wormatia Worms

Nándor Lengyel (6 June 1914 – 9 January 1968) was a Hungarian football manager. He managed the Luxembourg national football team, Schalke 04, Rot-Weiß Oberhausen and Wormatia Worms.
