= Milan Nikolić (football manager) =

Serbian footballer and manager

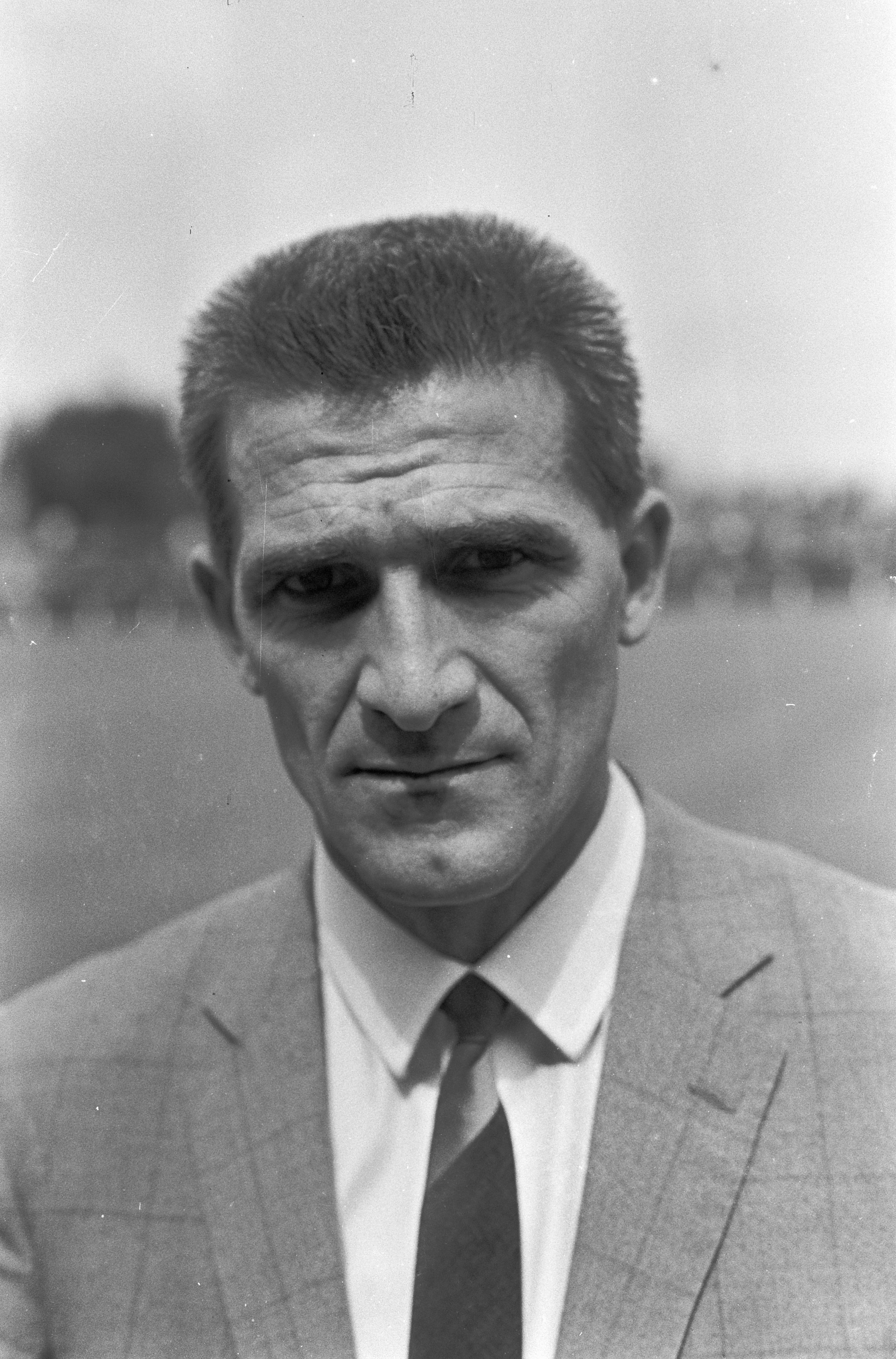
- Nikolić pictured in 1967

Personal information
- Date of birth: 6 June 1929
- Place of birth: Belgrade, Kingdom of Serbs, Croats and Slovenes
- Date of death: 25 August 2015 (aged 86)
- Place of death: Munich, Germany
- Position: Midfielder

Senior career*
Years	Team	Apps	(Gls)
1955	LASK		
1955–1956	Rapid Wien	3	(0)
1956–1957	PSV	6	(0)
1958–1960	Willem II	31	(0)

Managerial career
- 1967: PSV
- 1967–1970: 1. FC Saarbrücken
- 1970–1972: Wormatia Worms
- 1978–1979: TuS Neuendorf
- 1982–1983: FC Luzern
- 1992–1994: VfR Neumünster
- * Club domestic league appearances and goals

Milan Nikolić (6 June 1929 – 25 August 2015) was a Serbian professional football player and manager.

Nikolić played abroad for LASK Linz, Rapid Wien, PSV Eindhoven and Willem II Tilburg.

He later coached PSV Eindhoven, 1. FC Saarbrücken, Wormatia Worms, TuS Neuendorf, FC Luzern, and VfR Neumünster.

== Honours ==
=== Player ===
Rapid Wien

- Austrian League: 1955–56
