= Peek & Son =

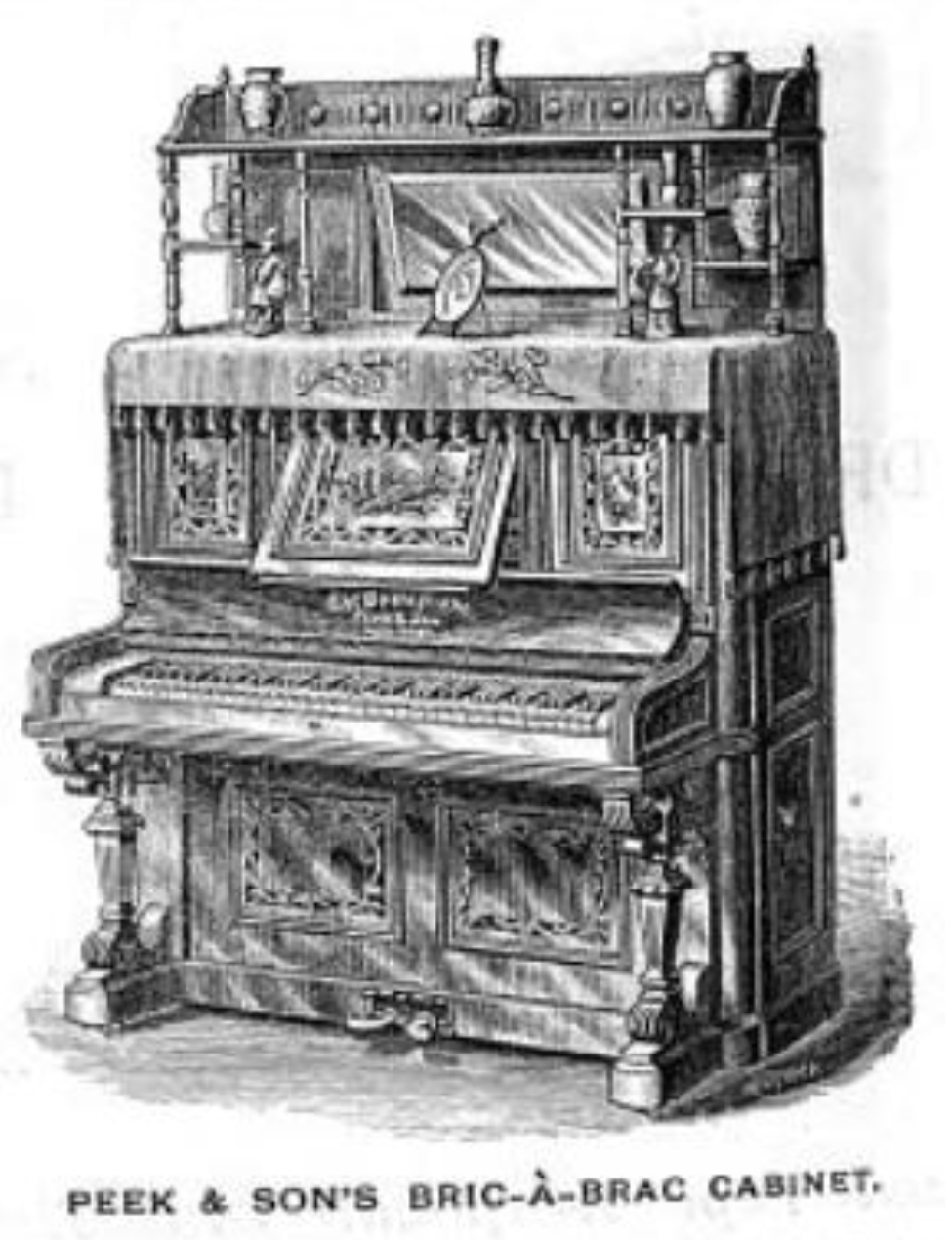

Peek & Son was an American piano manufacturing company based in New York City. Founded in 1850, it made pianos until closing during the Great Depression.

== History ==
David C. Peek (August 4, 1797 – July 14, 1866) was an organ and piano builder, piano tuner, and cabinet maker. He worked as the piano tuner for the Stuyvesant family among other prominent New York residents beginning in the 1820s. He was only one of three piano tuners active in New York City in the year 1830, the others being James Pirsson and John Love. He began working as an organ builder and cabinet maker in New York City out of a shop located at 36 Rhynders & Broome Street in c. 1820, and by 1822 was a partner in the short-lived firm of Peek & Burns. He later established the piano manufacturing firm of Peek & Brennison in 1842 with William Brennison, and was active until at least 1856.

David C. Peek's son, David T. Peek (1825 – 18 April 1901) founded Peek & Son (originally called Peek & Company) in 1850; a company which manufactured both pianos and melodeons. David T. apprenticed as a piano maker with Pirsson after initially training under his father. He made and sold his first piano in 1844. After establishing his company, he entered the instrument making competition at the 1856 American Institute Fair; winning first prize. Soon after the company became the first known American piano manufacturer to export pianos to Japan.

Peek & Company was originally located at 540 West 40th Street, but subsequently relocated several times as it grew. In 1867 David T.'s son George W. Peek (born 1848) began apprenticing under his father, and four years later he was made a junior partner in the firm. At this time it was re-named Peek & Son. The company was particularly well known for its "opera piano"; a small upright piano that the company began manufacturing in 1883. Another model sold by the company was the euterpe piano.

Peek & Son pianos were sold by Jacob Brothers Piano Company of New York, H. A. Bodman & Sons of Boston and the Smith American Organ Company among other partner organizations. The firm was known for manufacturing higher quality pianos. It ceased operation during the Great Depression of the 1930s.

== Peek family ==
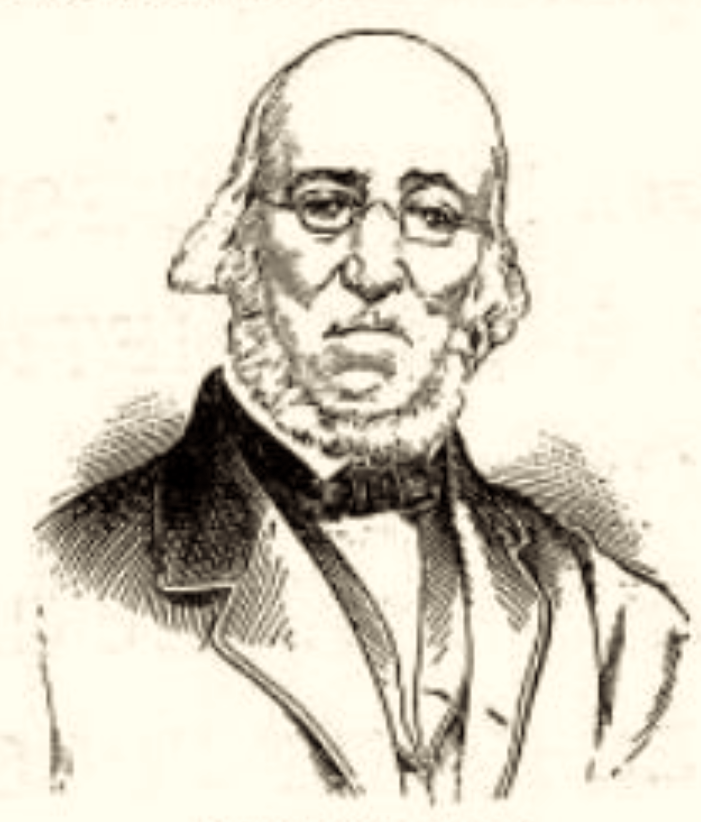
David C. Peek

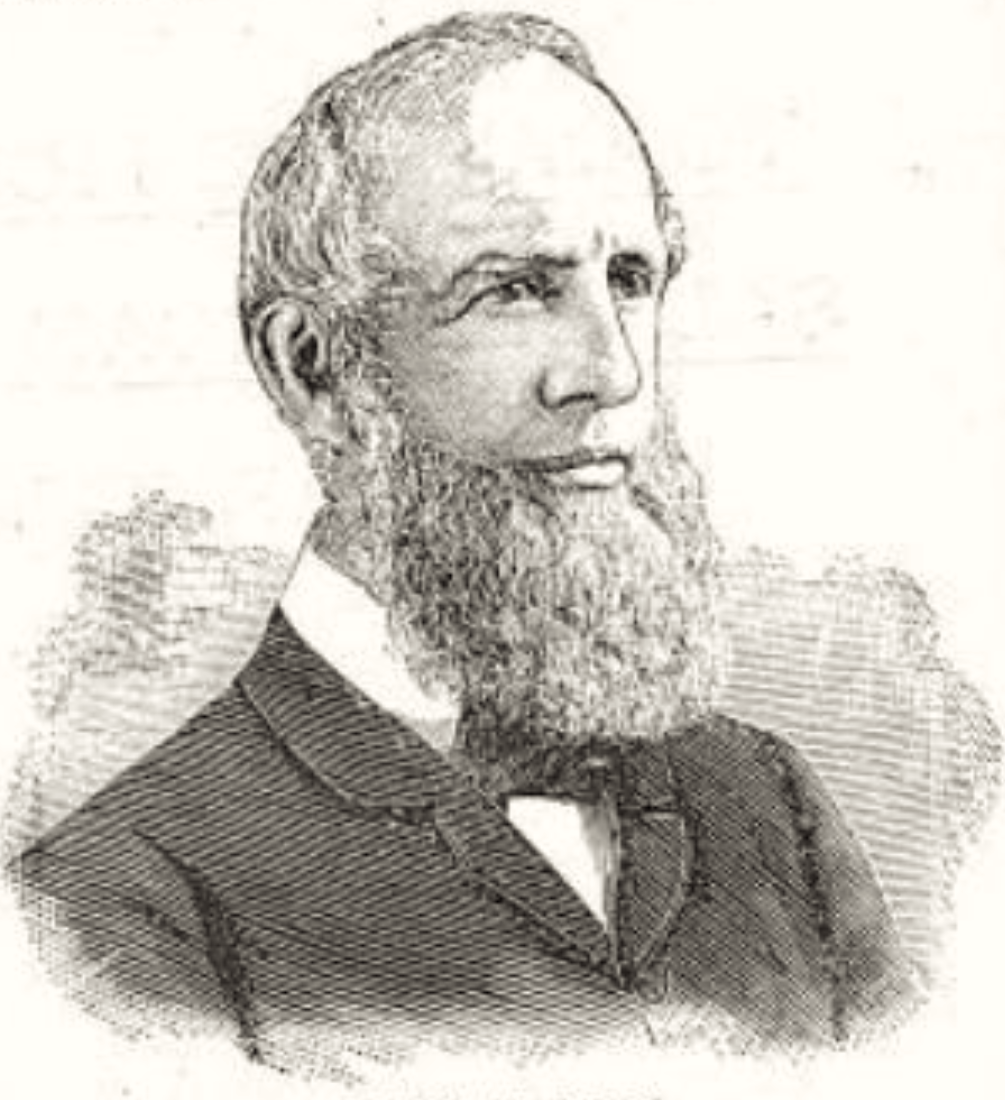
David T. Peek

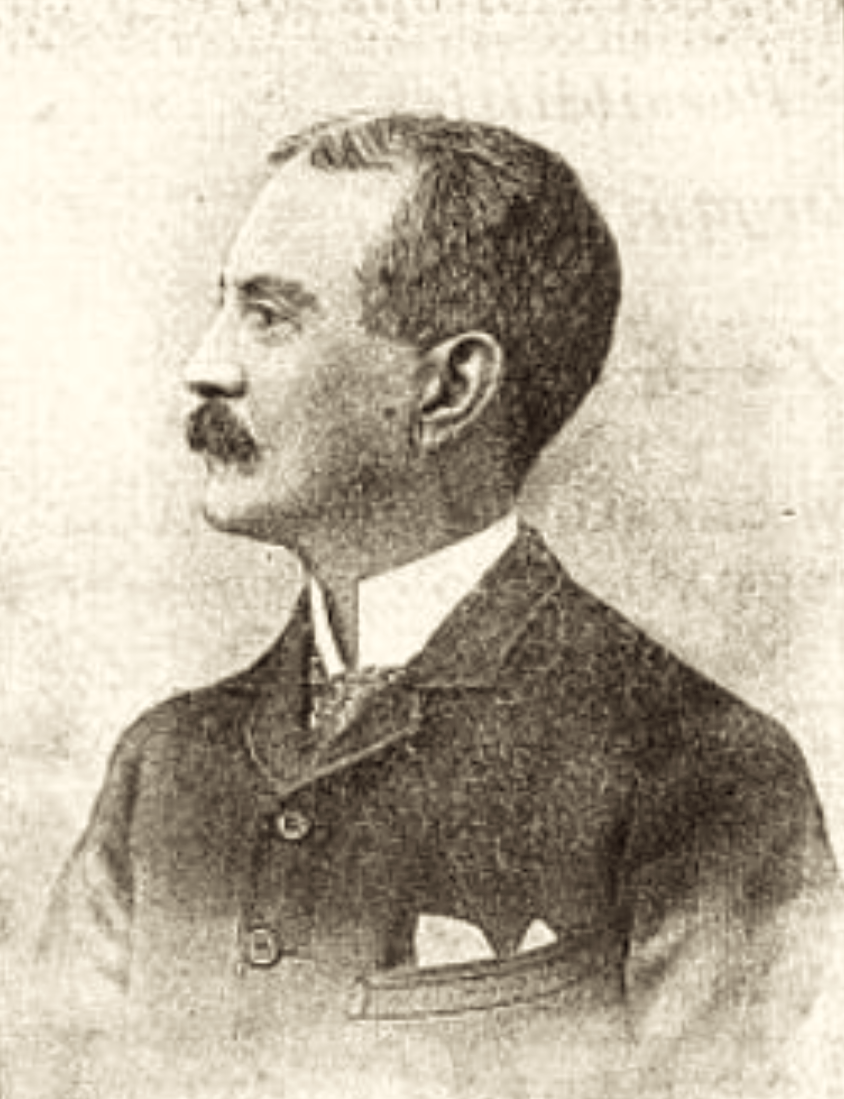
George W. Peek
