= Max Reichenberger =

German footballer

Personal information
- Date of birth: 24 January 1948
- Position: Defender

Senior career*
Years	Team	Apps	(Gls)
1967–1972	TSV 1860 München		
1972–1979	Eintracht Bad Kreuznach		

Managerial career
- 1994–1995: SV Wehen Wiesbaden
- 1996: SV Darmstadt 98
- 1997–2004: SpVgg Ingelheim
- 2004: Wormatia Worms
- * Club domestic league appearances and goals

Max Reichenberger (born 24 January 1948) is a German former football defender and manager.

He is the father of Thomas Reichenberger.
