= I Have Got the Blues To Day! =

"I Have Got The Blues To Day!"
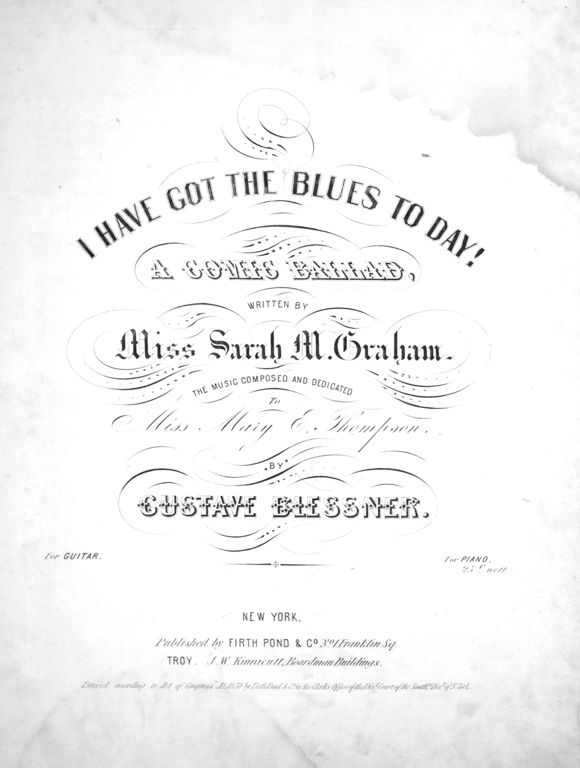
- Cover of "I Have Got The Blues To Day!", 1850.

Song
- Language: English
- Published: 1850
- Composer(s): Gustave Blessner
- Lyricist(s): Sarah M. Graham

"I Have Got The Blues To Day!" is a song published in 1850 with words by Miss Sarah M. Graham and music by Gustave Blessner. The song tells a tale of an evening of entertainment in which the singer imbibed too much. The next day, in various verses, his "little Fannie" fails to call, he is sick, he wonders if his friends are ailing also, etc. Each verse ends with a variation of the theme:

Then I was gayest of the gay,
But I have got the blues to day:
Then I was gayest of the gay,
But I have got the blues to day.

The song as composed by Blessner is in 2/4 time with the tempo as Allegretto.

"I Have Got The Blues To Day!" is often cited as being the first "blues"-titled song.

== Bibliography ==
- Graham, Sarah M.; Blessner, Gustave. "I Have Got The Blues To Day!" (sheet music). New York: Firth, Pond and Co. (1850).
