= Walter Schuberth =

German footballer (born 1950)

Personal information
- Date of birth: 1 April 1950 (age 75)
- Place of birth: Germany
- Position: Forward

Senior career*
Years	Team	Apps	(Gls)
1967–1970	SV Schwarzenbach		
1972–1976	1860 Munich	84	(16)
1976–1979	Wormatia Worms	81	(21)
1979–1985	Houston Hurricanes	28	(5)
1981–1982	VfB Coburg		
1982–1983	SpVg Eicha		
- * Club domestic league appearances and goals

Walter Schuberth (born 1 April 1950) is a German former footballer who played as a forward.

== Early life ==
Schuberth was born in 1950 in Germany. He started playing football at the age of five.

== Career ==
Schuberth started his career with German side SV Schwarzenbach. In 1972, he signed for German side 1860 Munich. In 1976, he signed for German side Wormatia Worms. In 1979, he signed for American side Houston Hurricanes. In 1981, he signed for German side VfB Coburg. In 1982, he signed for German side SpVg Eicha.

== Personal life ==
Schuberth is a native of Coburg, Germany. After retiring from professional football, he lived in Eicha, Germany.
