= Manfred Petz =

German footballer (born 1961)

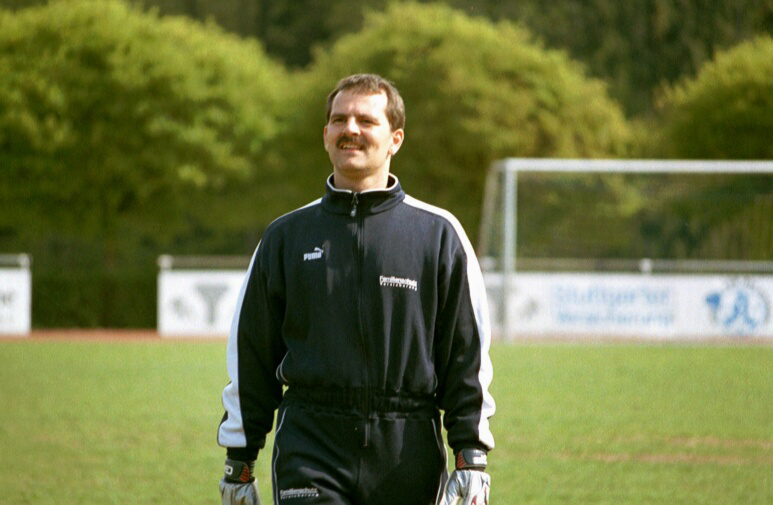
- Petz in 2013

Personal information
- Full name: Manfred "Moppes" Petz
- Date of birth: May 5, 1961 (age 65)
- Place of birth: Mainz, West Germany
- Height: 1.78 m (5 ft 10 in)
- Position: Goalkeeper

Youth career
- 1978: FVgg Kastel 06
- 1978–1979: 1. FSV Mainz 05

Senior career*
Years	Team	Apps	(Gls)
1979-1995	1. FSV Mainz 05	197	(0)
1987–1988	SV Wehen Wiesbaden	0	(0)

Managerial career
- 1997-1998: SV Wehen Wiesbaden
- 2003: SpVgg Ingelheim
- 2008: VfL Wolfsburg II
- * Club domestic league appearances and goals

Manfred Petz (born 5 May 1961) is a German footballer who played as a goalkeeper. Since 2011, he has been working at Eintracht Frankfurt, first as goalkeeper coach and later as scout.
