= Harald Braner =

German footballer

Personal information
- Date of birth: 19 August 1943
- Place of birth: Worms, Germany
- Date of death: 29 October 2022 (aged 79)
- Position: Midfielder

Senior career*
Years	Team	Apps	(Gls)
1962–1963	Wormatia Worms		
1963–1967	1. FC Kaiserslautern		
1967–1969	SSV Reutlingen		
1969–1971	VfL Osnabrück		
1971–1975	Wormatia Worms		

Managerial career
- 1980: FC 08 Homburg
- 1993: Wormatia Worms
- * Club domestic league appearances and goals

Harald Braner (19 August 1943 – 29 October 2022) was a German football midfielder and later manager.
