= Wormatia Worms =

German football club

VfR Wormatia 08 Worms
- Full name: Verein für Rasenspiele; Wormatia Worms 08 e.V.
- Founded: 23 May 1908; 118 years ago
- Ground: EWR-Arena
- Capacity: 5,624
- President: Florian Natter
- Head coach: Marco Reifenscheidt
- League: Oberliga Rheinland-Pfalz/Saar (V)
- 2025–26: Oberliga Rheinland-Pfalz/Saar, 8th of 18
- Website: http://www.wormatia.de
Home colours	Away colours	colours

VfR Wormatia 08 Worms is a German association football club that plays in Worms, Rhineland-Palatinate. The club and its historical predecessors were regular participants in regional first-division football competition until the formation of the national top-flight Bundesliga in 1963.

== History ==
Logo used until 2010

SC Wormatia was formed on 23 May 1908 and renamed VfL Wormatia Worms in 1921 just before merging with VfR Wormatia Worms in 1922. VfR was the product of the 1919 merger of Union 08 and Viktoria 1912. Both VfL and VfR were playing in the Kreisliga Hessen (I).

The combined side played in the Bezirksliga Rheinhessen-Saar earning mid-table results. In 1927, SC joined the Bezirksliga Main-Hessen and enjoyed first- and second-place finishes in that league's Gruppe Hessen. German football was re-organized under the Third Reich into sixteen Gauligen, or regional upper class leagues, in 1933. Wormatia found themselves playing in the Gauliga Südwest (I) where they continued to play well, capturing the division title three times. The side was merged into Reichsbahn TuSV Worms in 1938 and then played on under that name. The Gauliga Südwest was broken up into two divisions in 1941 and the club went to the Gauliga Hessen-Nassau, playing there for only a couple of seasons before the end of World War II and the collapse of league play.

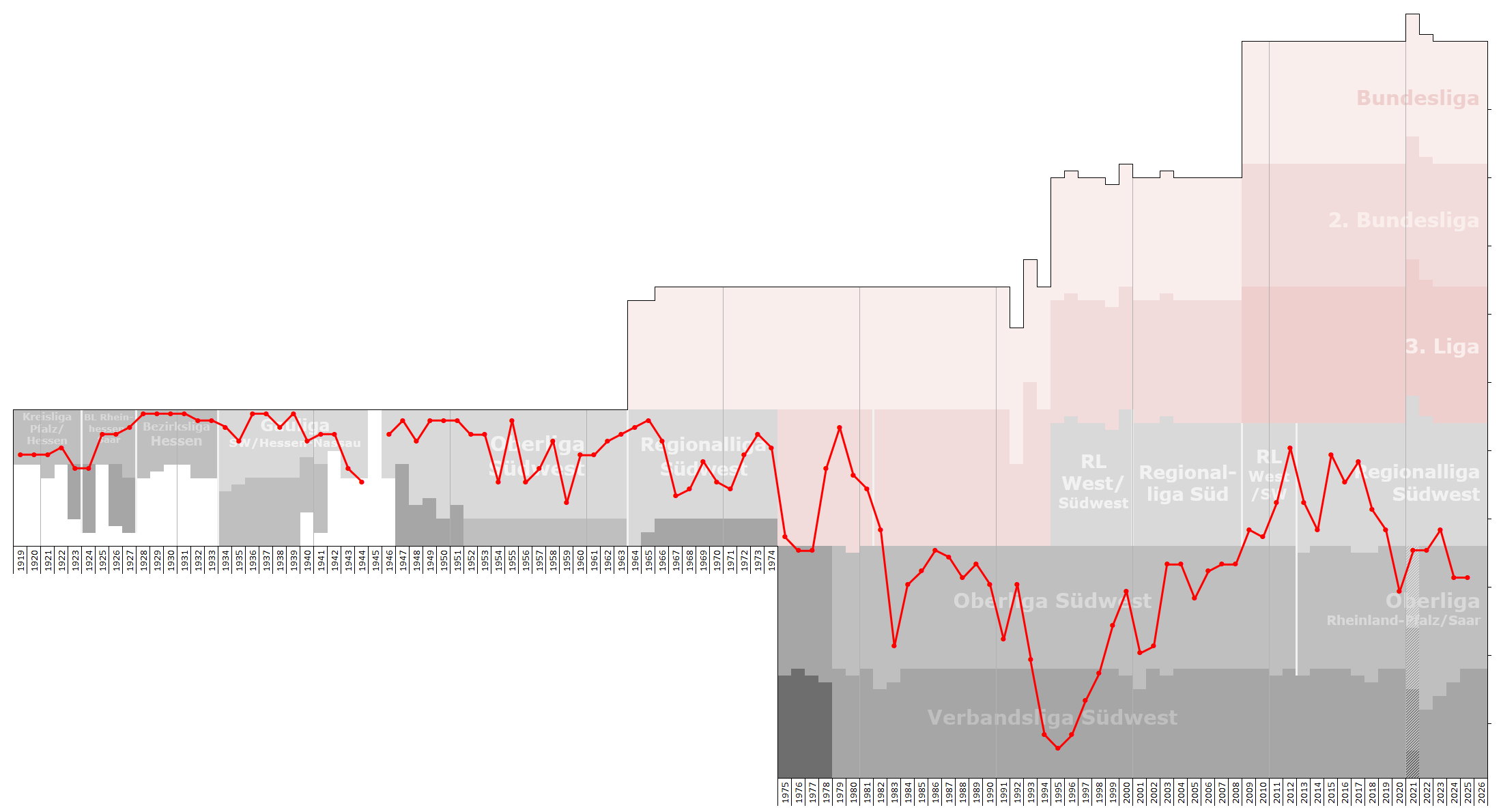
Historical chart of Wormatia league performance

The club re-emerged as VfR Wormatia Worms after the war and joined the Oberliga Südwest (I) earning finishes in the upper half of the table in its first decade of play there, but only once advancing into the national championship rounds. That performance slipped somewhat in the years leading up to the formation of the Bundesliga, Germany's first professional league, in 1963. In the late 1960s, Wormatia became one of the first clubs to display advertising on its jerseys. Wormatia was seeded into the second division Regionalliga Südwest (2. Bundesliga after 1973) where, except for two seasons in the mid-1970s, the club played until 1981. The club's best results came in 1965, when it finished second and played in the Bundesliga promotion rounds, and in 1979, when it earned a third-place finish in the 2. Bundesliga.

The 1979 season was full of drama for Wormatia. At the mid-way point of the season the side led the 2.Bundesliga Süd as the Herbstmeisterschaft, or Autumn champions. Their second round German Cup match against Hertha BSC Berlin was called at 1–1 when the lights in Berlin's Olympiastadion failed and Worms then lost the subsequent re-match 0–2. The league championship remained within the club's grasp almost to the last, but crucial points were lost in drawing two of the season's final three matches. All of this took place against a background of steadily growing financial problems.

After struggling to avoid relegation through several poor seasons, the team finally slipped to the tier III Amateur Oberliga Südwest in 1982. A return to the 2. Bundesliga after a first-place finish in 1986 was frustrated when the club was denied a license because of its weak financial state. Wormatia continued to play third-division football until another financial crisis in 1994 drove them down to the Verbandsliga Südwest (V). The team returned to the Oberliga Südwest (IV) in 1998 and played there until 2008, when it qualified for the new Regionalliga West (IV) formed after the introduction of the 3. Liga. Finishing in the relegation zone at the end of its first season there, the club was saved from being sent down by the withdrawal of 12th-placed FSV Oggersheim from the league. Worms improved the following year and was moved to the Regionalliga Süd (IV) from 2010 to 2012. At the end of the 2011–12 season, the club became part of the new Regionalliga Südwest (IV). They finished in a relegation position in 2014, but were spared from dropping back down to the Oberliga by the insolvency of SSV Ulm, but were relegated in 2019.

== Honours ==
The club's honours:

=== League ===
- Bezirksliga Main-Hessen (I)
  - Champions: 1928, 1929, 1930, 1931
- Gauliga Südwest/Mainhessen (I)
  - Champions: 1936, 1937, 1939
- Oberliga Südwest (I)
  - Runners-up: 1947, 1949, 1950, 1951, 1955
- Regionalliga Südwest (II)
  - Runners-up: 1965
- Oberliga Südwest (III)
  - Champions: 1986
- Amateurliga Südwest (III)
  - Champions: 1976, 1977
- Verbandsliga Südwest (V)
  - Champions: 1998

=== Cup ===
- South West Cup (Tiers III-VII)
  - Winners: 1976, 1988, 1992, 2007, 2009, 2012, 2018

== Current squad ==
As of 25th September 2025

Note: Flags indicate national team as defined under FIFA eligibility rules; some limited exceptions apply. Players may hold more than one non-FIFA nationality.

No.	Pos.	Nation	Player
1	GK	GER	Luca Pedretti
3	DF	FRA	Jean-Yves M'voto
4	DF	GER	Tevin Ihrig
5	DF	GER	Stefano Maier
-	MF	GER	Luca Fabio Manganiello
-	MF	GER	Jannik Marx
-	MF	GER	Sandro
-	FW	GER	Reda Chkifa
10	MF	GER	Fatih Köksal
11	FW	PLE	Alexander Shehada
-	-	ESP	(No one is on this right now)

No.	Pos.	Nation	Player
15	MF	GER	Jannik Marx
16	FW	GER	Marlon Ludwig
17	MF	GER	Sandro Loechelt
18	DF	GER	Pascal Nicklis
20	MF	GER	Luca Fabio Manganiello
21	GK	GER	Leon Guth
23	DF	GER	Ager Saady
24	DF	GER	Simon Ludwig
26	DF	GER	Elias Holzemer
27	DF	GER	Philipp Sonn
31	MF	GER	Evzi Saiti

== Former players ==
- (Germany) Walter Schuberth

== Recent seasons ==
The recent season-by-season performance of the club:

Season	Division	Tier	Position
1999–2000	Oberliga Südwest	IV	7th
2000–01	Oberliga Südwest	IV	16th
2001–02	Oberliga Südwest	IV	15th
2002–03	Oberliga Südwest	IV	3rd
2003–04	Oberliga Südwest	IV	3rd
2004–05	Oberliga Südwest	IV	8th
2005–06	Oberliga Südwest	IV	4th
2006–07	Oberliga Südwest	IV	3rd
2007–08 (Note: With the introduction of the Regionalligas in 1994 and the 3. Liga in 2008 as the new third tier, below the 2. Bundesliga, all leagues below dropped one tier.)	Oberliga Südwest	IV	3rd ↑
2008–09	Regionalliga West	IV	16th
2009–10	Regionalliga West	IV	17th
2010–11	Regionalliga Süd	IV	12th
2011–12	Regionalliga Süd	IV	4th
2012–13	Regionalliga Südwest	IV	12th
2013–14	Regionalliga Südwest	IV	16th
2014–15	Regionalliga Südwest	IV	5th
2015–16	Regionalliga Südwest	IV	9th
2016–17	Regionalliga Südwest	IV	6th
2017–18	Regionalliga Südwest	IV	13th
2018–19	Regionalliga Südwest	IV	16th ↓
2019–20 (Note: Season abandoned due to the COVID-19 pandemic.)	Oberliga Rheinland-Pfalz/Saar	V	7th
2020–21	Oberliga Rheinland-Pfalz/Saar	V	1st
2021–22	Oberliga Rheinland-Pfalz/Saar	V	3rd ↑
2022–23	Regionalliga Südwest	IV	16th ↓
2023–24	Oberliga Rheinland-Pfalz/Saar	V	5th
2024–25	Oberliga Rheinland-Pfalz/Saar	V	5th
2025–26	Oberliga Rheinland-Pfalz/Saar	V	8th

=== Key ===
↑ Promoted	↓ Relegated

== Former coaches ==
The managers of the club:

1920–1969	1970–1989	1990–2009	2010–present
Engelhardt (1920–1921); Peter Hartmann (1922–1923); Karl Willnecker (1923–1924); Ludwig Müller (1924–1926); Ludwig Philipp (1926–1931); Fritz Pölsterl (1931–1932); Curtis Booth (1932–1934); Ludwig Müller (1934–1939); Ferdinand Fabra (1939); Ludwig Müller (1945–1948); Fritz Fries (1949); Toni Kugler (1949–1953); Karl Striebinger (1953–1954); Ludwig Müller (1954–1957); Willibald Kreß (1957–1959); Karl Winkler (1959–1960); Paul Böhme (1960–1961); Radoslav Momirski (1961–1964); Nandor Lengyel (1964–1965); Manfred Neidig (1965–1966); Helmut Schneider (1966–1967); Karl-Heinz-Schmal (1967–1969)	Fritz Schollmeyer (1970); Virgil Popescu (1970); Walter Schlipp (1970); Milan Nikolić (1970–1972); Otmar Calder (1972); Radoslav Momirski (1972–1974); Slavko Stojanović (1974); Karl-Heinz-Schmal (1975–1976); Lothar Buchmann (1976); Bernd Hoss (1976–1977); Werner Kern (1977–1978); Eckhard Krautzun (1978); Özcan Arkoç (1979); Gerd Dier (1979); Bernd Fischer (1979–1980); Horst-Dieter Strich (1981); Slobodan Jovanovic (1981); Josef Stabel (1981–1983); Klaus Gleim (1983); Heiner Ueberle (1983–1987); Gerd Menne (1987–1988); Peter Klag (1988); Horst-Dieter Strich (1988); Peter Klag (1989); Stefan Lottermann (1989)	Eckhard Krautzun (1989–1990); Peter Klag (1990); Peter Unger (1990); Günter Braun (1990); Reinhard Meier (1990–1991); Heiner Ueberle (1991–1992); Peter Klag (1992); Gerd Dier (1992–1993); Harald Braner (1993); Hans Scheffel (1993–1995); Alexander Raab (1995); Heinz-Jürgen Schlösser (1995–1996); Engelbert Klag (1996–1997); Demir Hotić (1997–1999); Robert Jung (1999–2001); Lutz Hofmann (2001); Günther Birkle (2001); Peter Rubeck (2001–2002); Dirk Anders (2002–2004); Max Reichenberger (2004); Stefan Ertl (2004–2005); Alois Schwartz (2005–2007); Bernhard Trares (2007–2009); Jürgen Klotz (2009); Sascha Koch (2009); Jürgen Klotz (2009–2010)	Volker Kühr (2010); Ronny Borchers (2010–2012); Stefan Emmerling (2012–2013); Hans-Jürgen Boysen (2013–2014); Sascha Eller (2014–2015); Steven Jones (2015–2019); Kristjan Glibo (2019–2022); Maximilian Mehring (2022); Peter Tretter (2023–2024); John Antuna (2024)
