= Amalia Riégo =

Swedish opera singer

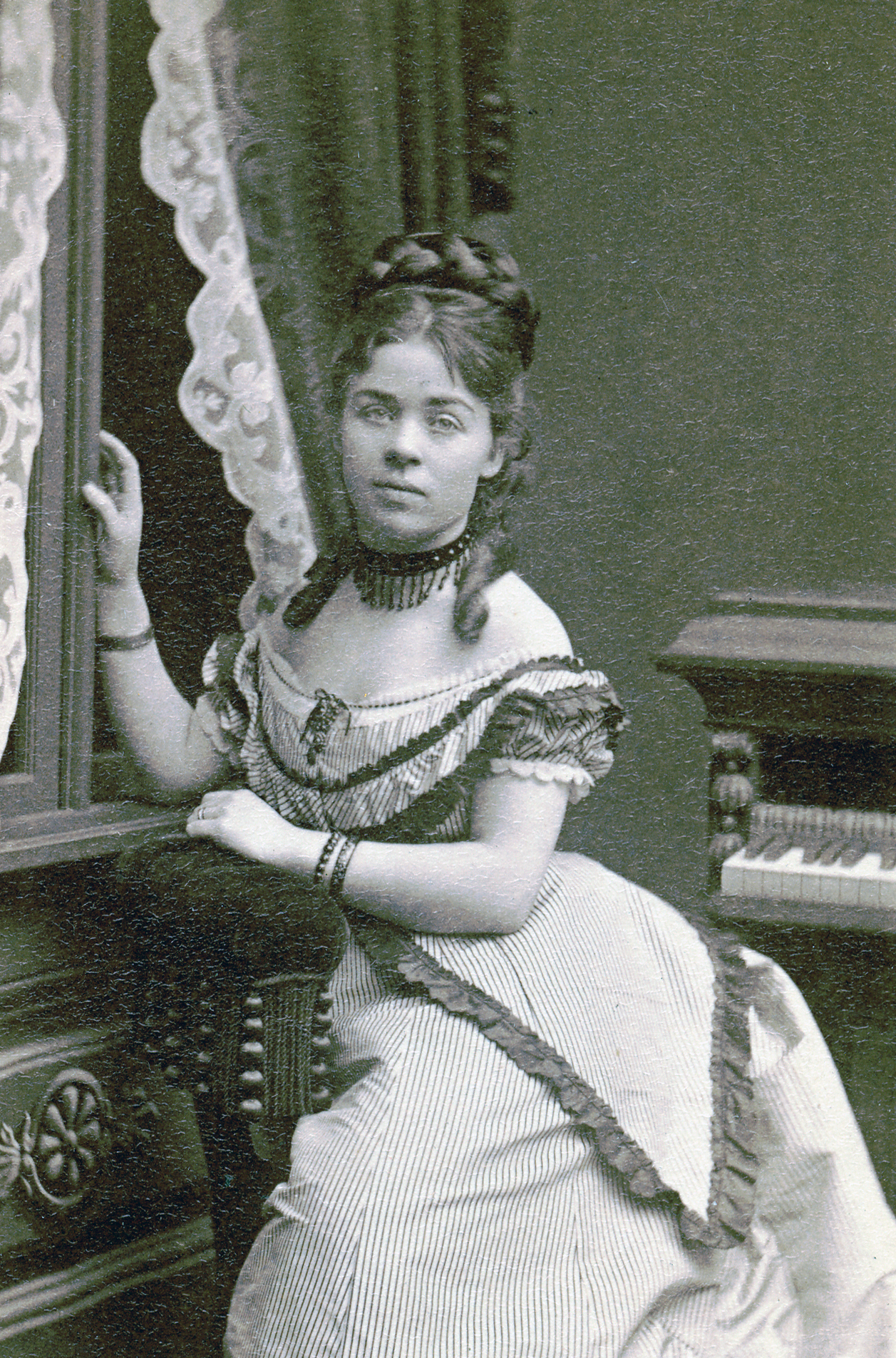

Amalia Riégo (26 March 1850 – 27 December 1926) was a Swedish soprano opera singer.

Amalia Riégo was born Wilhelmina Amalia Riego in Karlskrona. Her father was Swedish circus director and tightrope dancer Johan Joseph Riégo, and her mother was Norwegian born Anna Johanne Stiegler, also a circus performer. Amongst her many siblings, she was sister of the actor John Isak Riégo. She was a student of Jenny Lind and Isak Albert Berg and debuted at the Royal Swedish Opera in 1872, where she was active for many years. She immigrated to the US in 1890. She died in Nice at the age of 76.
