= Ludwig Schuberth (composer) =

German composer

Ludwig Schuberth (né Carl Gottfried Schuberth; 18 April 1806 – May 1850) was a German composer.

== Career ==
Schuberth was born in Magdeburg but spent much of his career in the Russian Empire. His works include symphonies, operas, chamber music, art songs, and songs for solo instruments. He died at St. Petersburg.
