= Piano Concerto No. 1 (Rubinstein) =

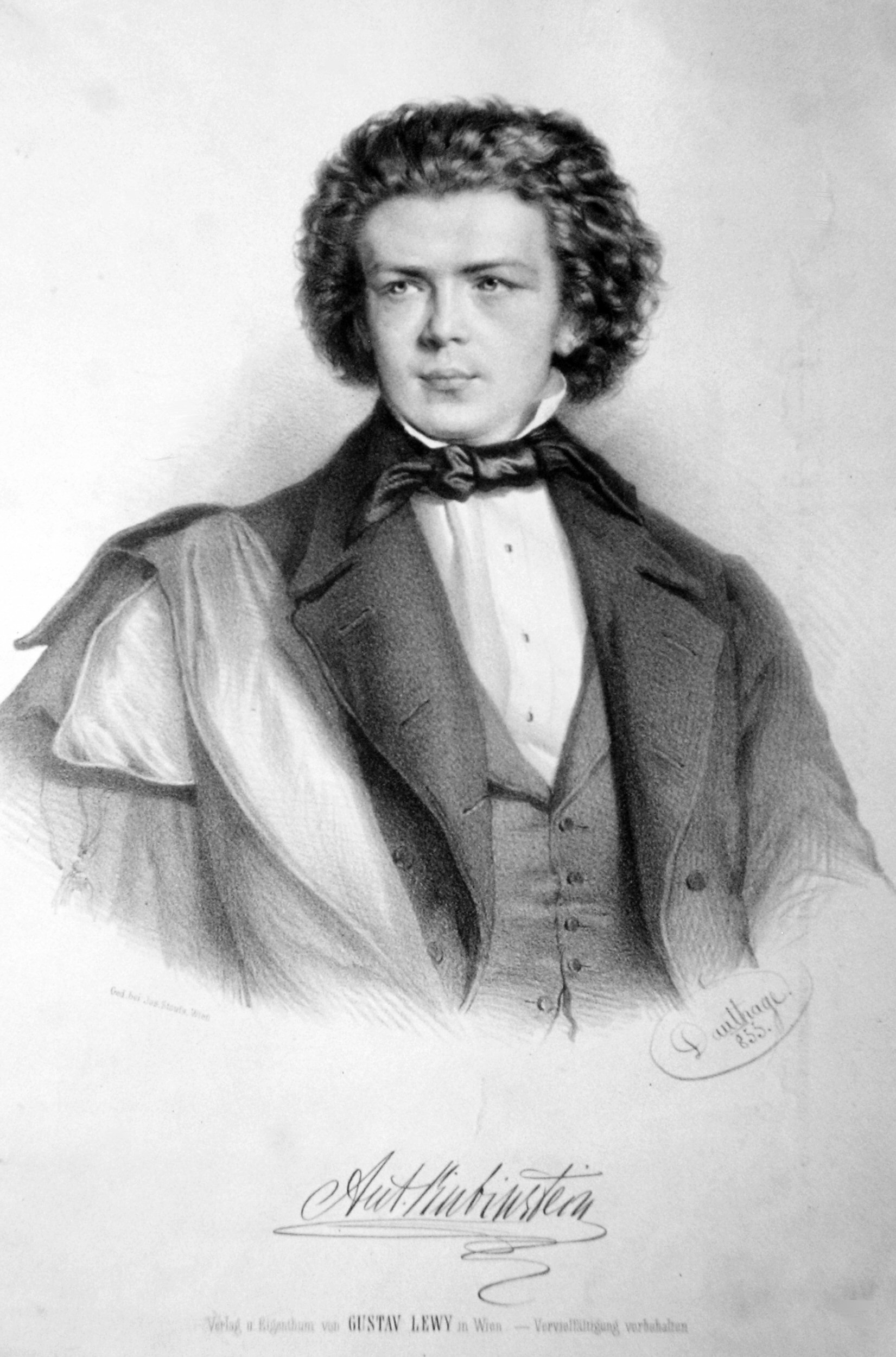
Lithograph of Anton Rubinstein, 1855

The Piano Concerto No. 1 in E minor, Op. 25, written in 1850 and published in 1858 by Anton Rubinstein is a Romantic concerto is dedicated to Alexandre Villoing, the composer's principal piano teacher. It is his fourth attempt at writing a concerto, two were from 1849 and were lost while the third from the same year was transformed into a Piano Octet, Op. 9. Although the First Concerto is the most traditional of the five concerti, a characteristic leonine quality in the piano scoring often emerges throughout.

== Structure ==
The concerto is in three movements:

1. Moderato
2. Andante con moto
3. Con moto

The dramatic opening movement is cast in traditional first-movement sonata form. After an extended orchestral exposition of the movement's primary themes, the piano enters with a dotted-rhythm figuration which immediately introduces the movement's principal theme, now boldly stated by the piano in chords and octaves. A lyrical second theme and a tarantella-like closing theme lead to a traditional development, followed by the recapitulation. The movement concludes with a massive coda that is typical virtuosic Rubinstein, yet which dramatically dies away in the last few bars, until it comes back in full force in the final chord.

The second movement opens with a lyrical theme played by the orchestra and piano, which transitions into a contrasting middle section. The original theme then returns in the orchestra, accompanied by arpeggios on the piano. Throughout the movement, the French horn performs solo and soli passages alongside the string section.

The first few bars of the third movement acts as a transition in mood. Rubinstein has the orchestra introduce the third movement with a melody that, although not identical, resembles the main theme of the second movement. But the piano impatiently interrupts three times, and finally bursts out with the rollicking main theme of this last movement. The theme is heard in several guises and in the company of a number of other themes, until finally it is brought back in the "wrong" keys of F and A♭ major. Rubinstein quickly shifts to the home tonality of E major before ending the concerto with a huge coda, replete with a long stretch of unrelenting virtuoso double octaves on the piano which must have daunted many a fledgling virtuoso of the day. The orchestra at the same time is heard in a march-like theme first given earlier in the movement, which brings the work to a triumphant end.

== Sources ==
- Program notes by Joseph Banowetz to his recording of this concerto with Czecho-Slovak State Philharmonic Orchestra (1992)
- Taylor, Philip S. (2007). Anton Rubinstein: A Life in Music. Bloomington, Indiana: Indiana University Press. ISBN 978-0-253-34871-5.
