= Karl Schuberth =

German composer and cellist (1811–1863)

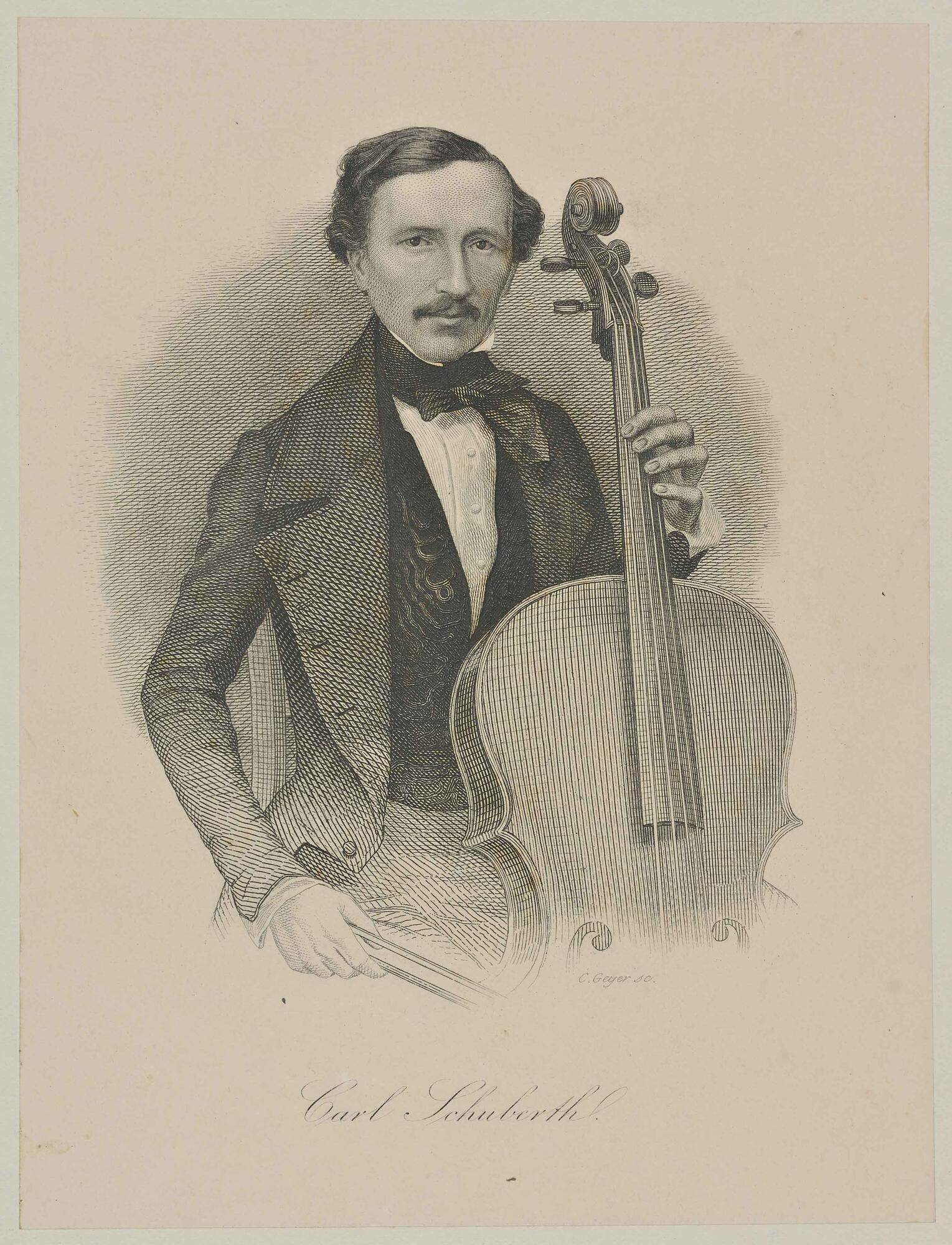

Karl (also Carl) Eduard Schuberth (Russian: Карл Богданович Шуберт, romanized: Karl Bogdanovich Shubert; 25 February 1811 – 22 July 1863) was a German composer, conductor, and cellist.

== Life ==
Schuberth was born in Magdeburg, studying piano with his father, Gottlob, and cello with L. Hesse in Magdeburg. He completed his studies under Friedrich Dotzauer. He toured in 1828–29, after that becoming the first cellist in the Magdeburg theater orchestra. Schuberth commenced extensive tours in Europe, funded by his brother Julius.

In autumn 1835 Schuberth settled as a solo cellist in the court of Saint Petersburg after his tour (having gone to Hamburg, the Netherlands, Belgium, Paris, and London), becoming music director of the University of Saint Petersburg and conductor in the court, where he introduced the works of Beethoven, Schumann, Liszt, Wagner, and other composers. The cellist was highly admired by the Saint Petersburg society (among them the young Anton Rubinstein).

He settled in Zürich in 1855. In May 1863, Schuberth made a trip to Zürich, where he died on 22 July.

== Works ==
The composer wrote cello, quartets, quintets, and octet works for strings. He published two cello concerti, Variations for Cello and Orchestra, an octet, three quintets (the third dedicated to Spohr), four quartets, fantasias, and a Cello Sonata (Op. 42).
