= Canada–United States softwood lumber dispute =

Trade dispute between Canada and the United States

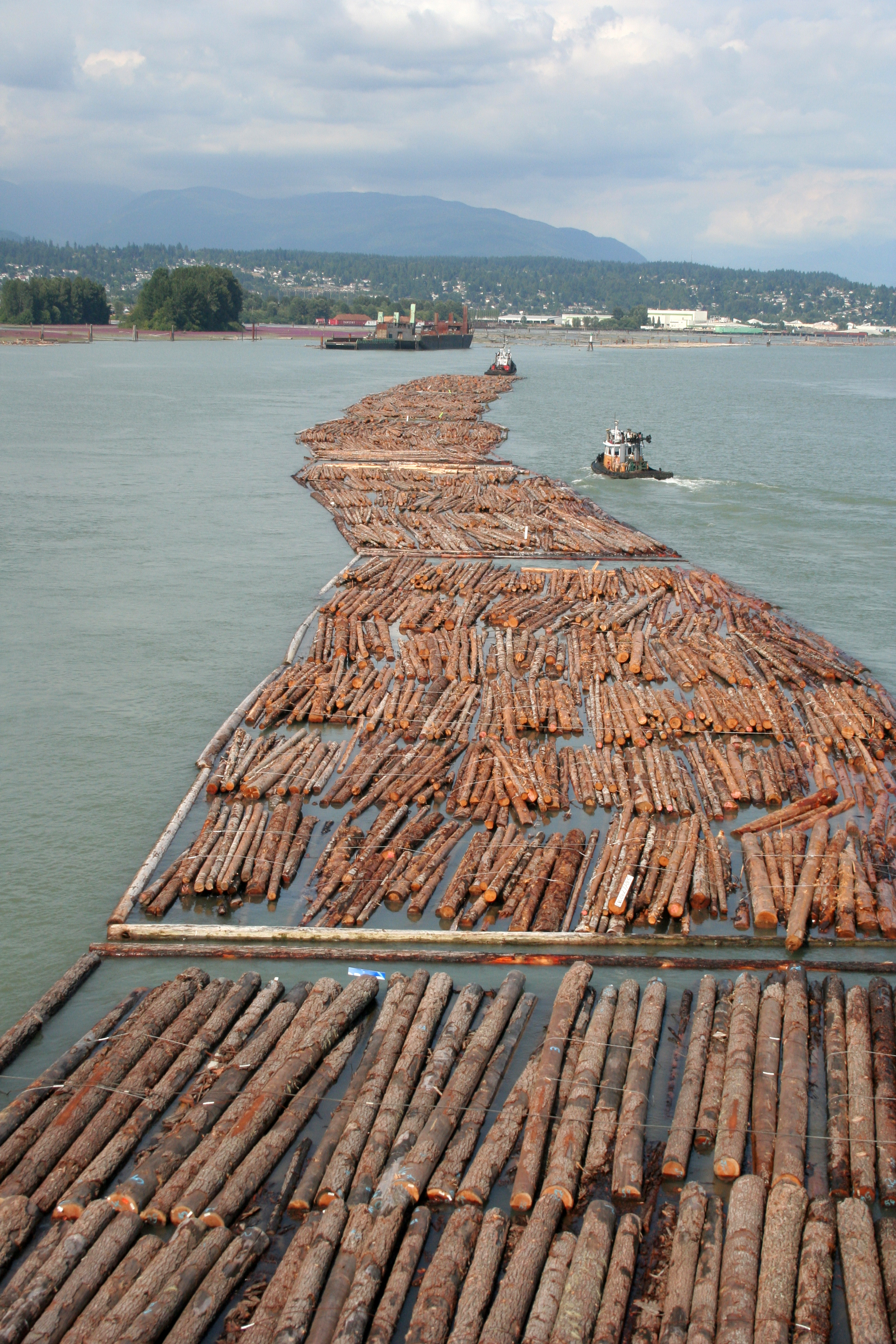
Log driving near Vancouver, B.C., Canada

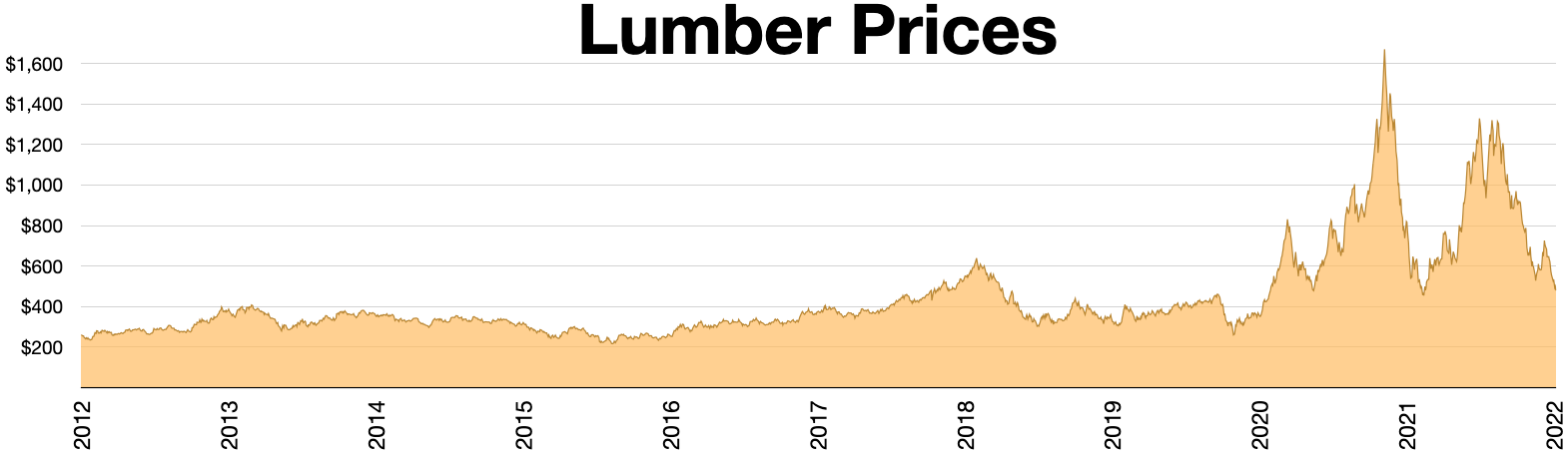
Lumber prices

The Canada–United States Softwood Lumber Dispute is an ongoing trade dispute between the United States and Canada concerning the Canadian export of softwood lumber. The conflict arose in 1982, and is one of the largest and most enduring trade disputes between the two nations.

The heart of the dispute is whether the Canadian lumber industry is unfairly subsidized by federal and regional governments. Most timber in Canada is owned by regional governments, and the prices charged to harvest timber (stumpage fees) are set administratively, rather than through the competitive marketplace, the norm in the United States. In the United States, softwood lumber lots are primarily privately owned, with the owners holding auctions to determine who has the right to harvest timber. U.S. lumber producers argue that the Canadian arrangement constitutes an unfair subsidy, and is thus subject to U.S. trade remedy laws, where foreign trade benefiting from subsidies can be subject to a countervailing duty tariff, to offset the subsidy and bring the price of the commodity back up to market rates.

The Canadian government and lumber industry dispute this assertion, based on a number of factors, including that Canadian timber is provided to such a wide range of industries, and that lack of specificity makes it ineligible to be considered a subsidy under U.S. law. Under U.S. trade remedy law, a countervailable subsidy must be specific to a particular industry. This requirement precludes imposition of countervailing duties on government programs, such as roads, that are meant to benefit a broad array of interests. Since 1982, there have been four major iterations of the dispute.

== Importance of lumber to Canada's economy ==
The softwood lumber industry is vital to the Canadian economy and has employed thousands of people. The forest industry has contributed to direct jobs for about 232,700 individuals. Indirectly, 289,000 people have been hired to work in other sectors that depend on Canada's forests. They include engineering, transportation, and construction. Such benefit from this industry can be seen in the nation's GDP, which added $21.2 billion in 2014. That accounted for around 1.3% of real GDP. Canada has the biggest trade surplus in relation to forest products ($21.7 billion in 2015). As the largest market, the U.S. is heavily dependent on Canada's lumber. The needs of the US outweigh the domestic supply. Canada has also been expanding rapidly into the Asian market, with China being the second-largest importer. The U.S. accounted for 69% of Canada's softwood lumber exports in 2015. This is an increased share of Canadian softwood lumber exports, which reached its lowest level in 2011, accounting for only 54%. China in that same year accounted for 21%.

== Softwood Lumber Agreement ==
In April 2006, the United States and Canada announced that they had reached a tentative settlement to end the dispute. The settlement, known as the Softwood Lumber Agreement (SLA), went into full effect in October 2006. The conditions stated that the period for this agreement would last anywhere between seven and nine years. Both countries, in 2012, approved a two-year extension. Under the preliminary terms, the United States would lift countervailing and anti-dumping duties provided lumber prices continue to stay above a certain range. Below the specified range, a mixed export tax and quota regime would be implemented on imports of Canadian lumber. On Canada's part, the nation agreed to enforce regulations, such as in the form of taxes on lumber exports headed to the U.S. The provincial governments of Canada, specifically, were encouraged to make changes to their pricing systems. Such changes would allow for a non-subsidizing system. As a part of the deal, more than $5 billion in duty deposits collected would be returned. The SLA establishes a dispute settlement mechanism based around the London Court of International Arbitration (LCIA), a nongovernmental institution. Either country may initiate dispute settlement of matters arising under the SLA or implementation thereof. Hearings are to be open to the public, as are pleadings and other documents. The agreement states that hearings are to be held in either the United States or Canada (the venue is selected by the arbitration tribunal). The SLA also provides that decisions of an arbitration panel are binding on the two parties.

== Lumber I ==
The beginnings of the softwood lumber dispute, commonly referred to as Lumber I, were in 1982, when the U.S. lumber industry petitioned the U.S. Department of Commerce (DoC) to impose a countervailing duty. Ultimately, the DoC found that Canada's stumpage system was not specific to any single industry and thus not countervail-able. While the DoC made this claim, the United States International Trade Commission (USITC) believed that these Canadian imports did in fact hinder U.S. producers. The U.S. lumber industry chose not to appeal.

== Lumber II ==
The second phase, Lumber II, began in 1986, when a U.S. lumber industry group, the U.S. Coalition for Fair Lumber Imports, petitioned the Department of Commerce. The USITC once again arrived at the conclusion that Canada's exports unfairly impacted American producers. This time, the DoC did find Canadian forest programs to be countervailable and set a preliminary duty of 15%. Before the subsidy was imposed, the United States and Canada agreed to a Memorandum of Understanding that created a phased tariff. One of the terms of the MOU was that Canada levy an export tax on lumber traveling to the United States. Provinces that were affected had the chance to reduce this tax, if they performed any action meant to counterbalance their subsidies. British Columbia had the tax removed in 1987 while Quebec had it partly lifted in 1988.

== Lumber III ==
Lumber III started in 1991 when Canada informed the United States it was withdrawing from the Memorandum of Understanding. In response, the Department of Commerce initiated a countervailing duty investigation, resulting in the DoC imposing countervailing duties. The Department of Commerce issued a final determination in May 1992, setting a countervailing duty rate of 6.51 percent.

This time, the Department of Commerce's determination was reviewed by a binational panel organized under the Canada–U.S. Free Trade Agreement (CUSFTA), the predecessor to the North American Free Trade Agreement. Prior to the signing of NAFTA, the DoC decision would have been reviewed by the United States Court of International Trade, but under CUSFTA, Canada had the option to have it reviewed by a binational panel, and they selected that option. The panel of three Canadians and two Americans found that the DoC's determination could not be supported by substantial evidence; which was a controversial decision, because the vote was along national lines, and the majority decision was based on the concept that U.S. law required the Department of Commerce to not only establish the existence of a subsidy, but also prove that the subsidy benefited the Canadian lumber industry. The U.S. Congress subsequently amended the law to explicitly state there was no "effects test". Additionally, the United States claimed that two of the Canadian panelists had conflicts of interests, and brought it before an extraordinary challenge committee. Again, this committee split along national lines.

In 1996, the United States and Canada reached a five-year trade agreement, The Softwood Lumber Agreement, officially ending Lumber III. Under its terms, Canadian lumber exports to the United States were limited to 14.7 billion board feet (34.7 million cubic meters) per year. However, when the agreement expired on March 31, 2001, the two countries were unable to reach consensus on a replacement agreement.

== Lumber IV ==
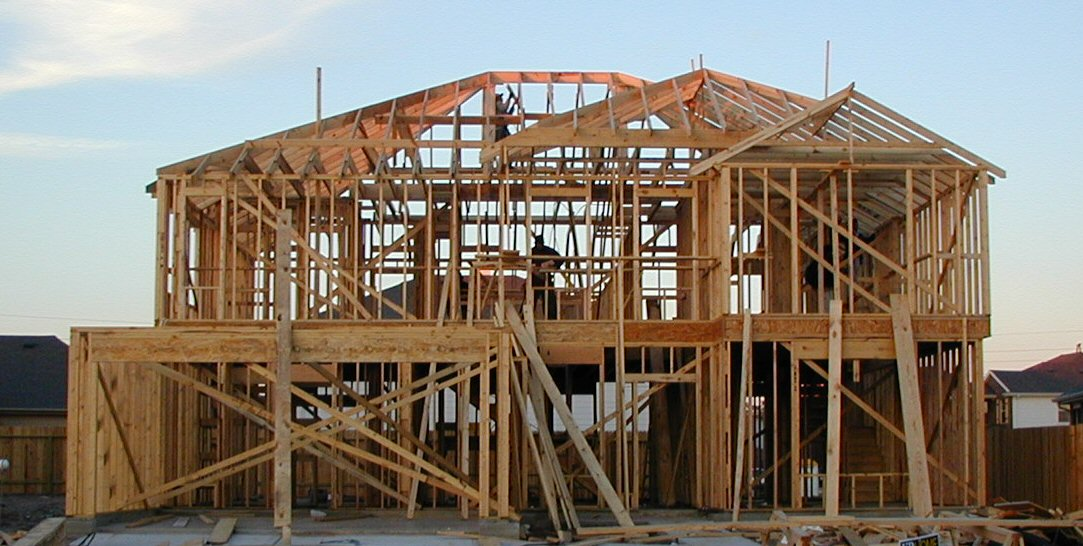
Many American homes are built of Canadian softwood lumber.

On April 5, 2001, less than a week after the Softwood Lumber Agreements expired, the U.S. lumber industry petitioned the Department of Commerce to impose countervailing duties. In addition, the U.S. industry for the first time brought an anti-dumping claim, arguing Canadian lumber companies were also engaged in unfair price discrimination.

Effective on August 17, 2001, the U.S. DoC imposed a preliminary 19.31% countervailing duty on Canadian softwood lumber imports. Later that year, on November 1, the DoC imposed a preliminary anti-dumping duty on top of the countervailing duty. It averaged 12.6%, although varied by company. On December 15, the preliminary countervailing duty expired, although the anti-dumping duty remained.

On April 25, 2002, U.S. DoC announced it had determined subsidy and anti-dumping rates, of 18.79% and an 8.43% respectively, to give a combined rate of 27.22%, although specific companies were charged varying rates. By February 26, 2003, 15,000 workers had been laid off, primarily in British Columbia, as a result of the duties imposed by the United States.

On May 27, the World Trade Organization issued a non-binding ruling in Canada's favor with regard to U.S. anti-dumping duties. The decision was appealed to a legally binding NAFTA panel. On August 13, the panel ruled that while the Canadian lumber industry could be considered subsidized, the DoC had improperly calculated duties based on U.S. stumpage prices: there was no "world market price" for timber, as the DoC had asserted, and it was therefore improper for DoC to calculate duties based on U.S. timber prices rather than Canadian market conditions. It accordingly ordered DoC to reassess its method of calculating duties.

Two weeks later, a WTO panel similarly concluded that the U.S. had imposed improperly high duties on Canadian lumber. The panel agreed with the DoC's contention that provincial stumpage fees did provide a "financial benefit" to Canadian producers, but ruled that this benefit did not rise to the level that would constitute a subsidy, and could not justify the U.S. duties.

On January 19, 2004, the WTO Appellate Body issued a final ruling with respect to the countervailing duty determination largely in Canada's favor (WTO Dispute 257). On August 11 of that same year, the Appellate Body issued a final ruling with respect to U.S. anti-dumping duties (WTO Dispute 264). In the meantime, because of an adverse WTO decision, the USITC reopened the administrative record, pursuant to a special provision in U.S. law, and issued a new affirmative threat of injury determination in December 2004. This new determination allowed the countervailing and anti-dumping duty tariffs to remain in place.

Between June 7, 2004, and October 5, 2005, DoC submitted five revised estimates of justifiable duties to the NAFTA panel, each successively lower than the last, the last being 1.21%, but each time the NAFTA panel found errors and ordered it to recalculate.

On April 15, 2005, the Canadian Minister of Trade, Jim Peterson, announced that the federal government would provide Canadian softwood lumber associations with $20 million in compensation for their legal expenses stemming from the dispute with the United States. That same year, another NAFTA Chapter 19 panel reviewed a determination made by the USITC that the U.S. lumber industry was under a threat of injury due to Canadian imports. Since the United States ceded jurisdiction to the World Trade Organization, it was necessary for the U.S. government to establish that a domestic industry was suffering injury, or faced a threat of injury, before countervailing duties can be imposed. The NAFTA panel found the USITC's determination invalid. In addition, the panel made the controversial decision to deny the USITC from reopening the administrative record, ordering the USITC to issue a negative determination based on the existing record. Unlike the panel during the Lumber III stage, this panel's decision was unanimous. However, the U.S. government challenged its decision before an extraordinary challenge committee, which, on August 10, 2005, issued a unanimous decision against the United States, finding that the NAFTA panel's determination was not sufficiently invalid to require vacatur or remand, under the standards of NAFTA.

On August 15, 2005, the United States said it would not abide by the NAFTA decision, because the Section 129 determination superseded the decision which was reviewed by the NAFTA panel. Two weeks later, on August 30, the WTO, which had previously ruled against the ITC, this time upheld their new Section 129 "threat of injury" ruling. In September 2005, a U.S. lumber industry associate filed suit in the U.S. Court of Appeals for the District of Columbia Circuit, challenging the constitutionality of the NAFTA Chapter 19 dispute settlement system. On November 24, 2005, the U.S. Commerce Department announced it would comply with a separate NAFTA panel's order to cut a 16 percent duty on Canadian softwood lumber imports for now. The following month, the DoC announced recalculated countervailing and anti-dumping duties on softwood, totaling 10.8 percent.

In March 2006, a NAFTA panel ruled in Canada's favor, finding that the subsidy to the Canadian lumber industry was de minimis, i.e., a subsidy of less than one percent. Under U.S. trade remedy law, countervailing duty tariffs are not imposed for de minimis subsidies. A tentative deal was reached in July 2006, in which Canada got $4 billion of the $5.3 billion it lost because of the penalties with no additional tariffs to be imposed. After initial opposition from several large Canadian lumber concerns, the Harper government, without specifying how many companies endorsed it, was confident that there would be enough support to culminate the deal. In August 2006, Prime Minister Stephen Harper brought the new deal to Parliament for discussion and a possible confidence vote. If the House of Commons had voted against the deal, it would have automatically forced a general election and annulled the deal. The Conservatives were in favor of the deal, while the New Democratic Party and the Liberal Party were against, leaving the Bloc Québécois as the deciding party.

On September 7, Bloc Québécois Leader Gilles Duceppe endorsed the softwood lumber deal, effectively neutralizing any chance of an election coming out of a non-confidence vote. Five days later, Canadian International Trade Minister David Emerson, along with U.S. counterpart Susan Schwab, officially signed the deal in Ottawa. Despite supporters' claims that it was the best deal possible, Elliott Feldman, an international and economic law specialist from the firm Baker & Hostetler in Washington, D.C. and a former director of the Canadian–American Business Council, criticized the deal as "one-sided" and a "bad deal for Canada". On September 19, 2006, the deal passed its first reading in the Canadian House of Commons with a 172–116 majority. On September 27, the Canadian Press reported that Canada did not meet an October 1 deadline imposed by itself to implement the agreement. Withdrawal of some of the 30 issues regarding the deal was the main reason for the delay on complying to the deal.

On March 30, 2007, the United States requested formal consultations with Canada to resolve concerns regarding Canada's lack of implementation of the export measures. The following month, on April 19, formal consultations took place between the two governments. On August 7, the United States, pursuant to a settlement mechanism established in the 2006 Softwood Lumber Agreement (SLA), initiated arbitration in the London Court of International Arbitration (LCIA, a private body). The official request for arbitration took place on August 13. Canada responded to this request for arbitration on September 12. The next year, on January 18, the U.S. government filed a second arbitration request, this one focused on the provincial implementation programs of Ontario and Québec. Canada responded on February 18, 2008. On March 4, the LCIA ruled (in the first arbitration) that Canada was in violation of the 2006 SLA in its eastern provinces, but not in its western provinces. The panel had been made up of a Belgian arbitrator nominated by Canada, a British arbitrator named by the United States, and a panel president from Germany. On February 26, 2009, the LCIA announced its ruling in the second arbitration case: Canada was in breach of the softwood lumber agreement as a result of its failure to properly calculate quotas from January to June in 2007. The arbitration body ordered that sawmills in the provinces of Ontario, Quebec, Manitoba, and Saskatchewan pay an additional ten percent export charge (up to $68.26 million). The tribunal imposed a 30-day deadline to rectify the breach.

== Post agreement ==
The Softwood Lumber Agreement expired on October 12, 2015. Canadian producers of softwood lumber now have unfettered access to the US softwood lumber market.

There are several impediments that have kept Canada and the US from negotiating a new agreement to replace the SLA. One key factor is that Canada held a federal election campaign through the late summer and fall of 2015, and any decisions of considerable magnitude had to wait until after the election. Given the acrimonious history of the US–Canada lumber trade prior to the SLA, the negotiation process will likely be lengthy.

Some in Western Canada have expressed a desire to renew the SLA as it currently stands, while other are demanding revisions. Some officials in Quebec believe that the province has made the necessary changes to their forestry practices to make them exempt from any future agreement, much the same as the Maritime provinces. And some producers in Saskatchewan have expressed a desire to switch to the Option A system used in BC and Alberta, which assesses a larger tax but has no quota restrictions.

Canadian ownership of US sawmills continues to climb with the count now reaching 40 mills, up from just two a decade earlier. West Fraser now owns more sawmills in the US South (16) than in Canada (13), Canfor Corp owns 11 sawmills in the South, one less than its Canadian total. Interfor owns 13 sawmills in the US – nine in the South and four in the Northwest. It owns five sawmills in Canada. The growing trend of Canadian ownership of US mills is driven by the potential for a lumber trade conflict, by timber availability and lower labour costs in the US. Amid the Mountain Pine Beetle infestation in Western Canada, these firms' ability to grow is severely diminished without looking outside of Canada.

Major industry organizations in the United States, on the other hand, do not want to renew the contract. Executive director of the U.S. Lumber Coalition Zoltan Van Heyningen has expressed his disapproval for the ongoing format of the agreement. One of the reasons for this is changing timber costs, which the U.S. believes has not been incorporated in B.C. lumber costs. The US Lumber Coalition is emphatic that, should negotiations fail, its legal standing to petition the US Commerce Department to file a new case is secure.

In early March 2016, Canadian Prime Minister Justin Trudeau and U.S. President Obama instructed their respective cabinet members responsible for international trade to explore all options for resolving the trade dispute. Canada's international trade minister, Chrystia Freeland, said that "what we have committed to is to make significant, meaningful progress towards a deal—to have the structure, the key elements there a 100 days from now".

On 12 October 2016, a one-year moratorium on trade actions since the expiration of the deal ended. As of November 2016, Freeland had formally met with U.S. Trade Representative Michael Froman twelve times in the past year. During these talks, Canada sent ten proposals and papers to the United States, which sent four to Canada.

In November 2016, CNN obtained a leaked memo from the Donald Trump transition team showing that Trump was being advised to include the softwood lumber dispute during any renegotiations of the North American Free Trade Agreement and to get more favourable terms for the United States.

On April 24, 2017, U.S. Commerce Secretary Wilbur Ross said his agency will impose new anti-subsidy tariffs averaging 20 percent on Canadian softwood lumber imports, a move that escalates a long-running trade dispute between the two countries. A Commerce Department fact sheet on the pending announcement seen by Reuters shows that West Fraser Mills will pay the highest duties at 24.12 percent, followed by Canfor Corp at 20.26 percent. Resolute FP Canada Ltd will pay a 12.82 percent duty, while Tolko Marketing and Sales and Tolko Industries will pay a 19.50 percent duty and J. D. Irving Ltd, will pay 3.02 percent. All other Canadian producers face a 19.88 percent duty, according to the document.

On April 25, 2017, the Trump administration announced plans to impose duties of up to 24% on most Canadian lumber, charging that lumber companies are subsidized by the government. The duties are on the five firms: West Fraser Mills, Tolko Marketing and Sales, J. D. Irving, Canfor Corporation, and Resolute FP Canada. West Fraser Mills will pay the highest duty of 24%.

The preliminary determination directs U.S. Customs and Border Protection to require cash deposits for the duties on all new imports as well as softwood products imported over the past 90 days. To remain in effect, however, the duties need to be finalized by Commerce and then confirmed by the U.S. International Trade Commission after an investigation that includes testimony from both sides. In response, the Canadian federal government indicated that it was exploring the possibility of banning United States coal from being exported through Canadian ports and imposing a retaliatory tariff on lumber exports from Oregon. By November 2017, the U.S. International Trade Commission decided to levy heavy countervailing and anti-dumping duties on lumber imports, citing that the U.S. industry has been harmed by unfair practices.

The decision was unanimous for the four-member trade panel, which ruled on the petition filed by the U.S. Lumber Coalition. Canada immediately lodged a legal challenge to the decision under NAFTA's Chapter 19 dispute settlement mechanism, with an official statement declaring that it was "unfair, unwarranted, and troubling." Canada has previously won several NAFTA challenges involving softwood issues in the past. In March 2018, Canada escalated the dispute to the WTO, asking the international trade body to set up an adjudication panel to judge its dispute with the United States. Canadian representatives argued that talks with the U.S. have failed.

On April 1, 2019, the U.S. Department of Commerce initiated the First Administrative Review (AR1) of antidumping duty and countervailing duty investigations of imports of certain softwood lumber products from Canada. The Department of Commerce its preliminary determination for the First Administrative Review on February 7, 2020. The preliminary determination included an assessment rate to be applied to exports during the period of review (April 28, 2017 through December 31, 2018) and a new cash deposit rate to be applied to new shipments upon completion of the review. The rates will only be applicable to companies covered by the First Administrative Review.

On January 2, 2020, the U.S. Department of Commerce announced the Second Administrative Review (AR2) of antidumping duty and countervailing duty investigations of imports of certain softwood lumber products from Canada. The Second Administrative Review was initiated on March 10, 2020. An administrative review will be conducted each year, unless the case is settled, to recalculate the countervailing and antidumping duty rates for shipments during the period of review and to establish a new cash deposit rate for future shipments. A company will be subject to the review if there has been a specific request for a review of that company filed by interested parties with the Department of Commerce.

On August 24, 2020, the WTO issued its report, which the U.S. subsequently appealed on September 28. However, there was no one at the WTO to appeal to, since the U.S. had blocked appellate vacancies.

On March 4, 2021, the U.S. Department of Commerce announced the notice of initiation of its Third Administrative Review (AR3) of the softwood lumber countervailing and anti-dumping duty orders.

On 9 November 2021, the US implemented a double tariff on Canadian softwood, which in turn increased lumber prices in the US even further. As a result, the shortage and higher prices for lumber in 2021/2022 have increased inflationary pressures for American consumers.

On August 19, 2024, the US raised tariff rates on imports of Canadian softwood lumber products from 8.05% to 14.54%.

== See also ==
- Economy of Canada
- Economy of the United States
- Byrd Amendment
