= Stumpage =

Payment for the right to harvest timber

Stumpage is the price a private firm pays for the right to harvest timber from a given land base. It is paid to the current owner of the land. Historically, the price was determined on a basis of the number of trees harvested, or "per stump". Currently it is dictated by more standard measurements such as cubic metres, board feet, or tons. To determine stumpage, any stand that will be harvested by the firm is first assessed and appraised through processes aimed at finding the volume of timber that is to be harvested. A given stumpage rate, measured in $/volume, is then applied to the amount of timber to be harvested. The firm will then pay this price to the landowner.

== Stumpage in Canada ==
Canadian forests exist mainly on what is considered to be crown land, under the provincial governments' control. On Canadian crown land, stumpage is known as the market value of standing trees that must be paid by firms for the right to harvest timber, currently measured in $/cubic meter. In Canada, legislation dictates the method by which stumpage fees are calculated according to market conditions. Each Canadian province has its own calculation method based on market-based benchmark prices. Long-term agreements are reached regarding the management and harvesting performed on each province's crown land. These long term agreements, are "rolling renewable" provisions, whereby the firm has fulfilled all the obligations associated to it.

== Stumpage in the United States ==
In the United States, much of the land used for harvesting timber is private wherein, "stumpage prices are determined by the market". Competitive auctions determine the stumpage fees to be paid. The difference between the cost of acquisition of harvested timber between the United States and Canada is the cause of the ongoing Canada-United States softwood lumber dispute. The United States' representatives claim the Canadian system of determining stumpage fees amounts to a subsidy. Canadian representatives deny this.

== Methods of valuing timber ==
The OECD has three methods that can be applied to value standing timber.

Net present value. Valuation method to value stocks of natural resources. It is obtained discounting future flows of economic benefits to the present period.

St = Σ ( At * pT * QT) / (1 + r)T−t

Only receipts from harvesting mature timber are included. To reach the net present value, discounting using a discount rate of r for each of the (T−t) years until harvest must be applied.

Stumpage value method. A simplified net present value method where the value of the stock is obtained by multiplying the current volume of standing timber by its stumpage price, assuming the rate of discount is equal to the natural growth rate.

S = A * p * Q

Value of standing timber = Area * price per m^{3} * Quantity of timber.

Consumption value method. A variant of the stumpage value method. Different prices are used for different ages or diameter classes. The consumption value method measures the value of the stock as if it were all cut now.

S = Σ At * pt * Qt

Value of standing timber = Sum of Areas of different times or ages of timber * price per different time or age class of timber * Quantity of timber of each time or age class.

== See also ==
- Canada-United States softwood lumber dispute
- Faustmann's formula
- Land ownership in Canada
- Royalties
- Severance tax
