= Severance tax legislative history in California =

A severance tax is an article of legislation that imposes a tax on the extraction of natural resources. In the United States, California is the only state that does not impose a significant severance tax. Instead, California imposes a statewide assessment fee, as set by the California Department of Conservation, and individual counties may choose to impose an ad valorem tax on a per county basis. Over the years, several measures have been introduced as ballot initiatives and legislation in an attempt to pass a statewide severance tax, though none has become law.

== Recent history ==
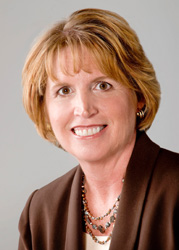
Former State Senator Noreen Evan, sponsor of the latest legislative attempt to pass a severance tax in 2014.

=== 1990s ===
In the 1990s, the California State Assembly proposed two similar bills, Assembly Bills 1693 by Assemblymember Burt Margolin and 336 by Assembly member Antonio Villaraigosa. Both measures imposed a 6% oil severance tax and the revenues to be raised from the measure were to be directed into California's General Fund. Both measures were stalled in their respective committees and thus never became law.

=== 2006 ===
In 2006, Proposition 87 was proposed, which was a combined constitutional amendment and ballot initiative state statute that was defeated with 45.4% of Californians voting in support of the measure, and with 54.7% opposed. If passed, the proposition would have created the California Energy Alternatives Program Authority, a $4 billion program with the goal of reducing California's dependence on petroleum. Businessman Stephen Bing and Nobel Prize–winning climatologist Dr. Daniel Kammen sponsored the initiative. It was the most expensive campaign in initiative history throughout the United States with the Yes on 87 sponsors raising a combined $61,886,129 and with the No on 87 sponsors raising $94,430,014.

=== 2007-2008 ===
During the 2007-2008 legislative session, California Assembly member Fabian Núñez proposed Assembly Bill 9, a 6% oil severance tax, which directed revenues towards educational purposes for the first fiscal year after implementation. The bill subsequently died in the unfinished business file of the Assembly and did not become law.

=== 2009-2010 ===
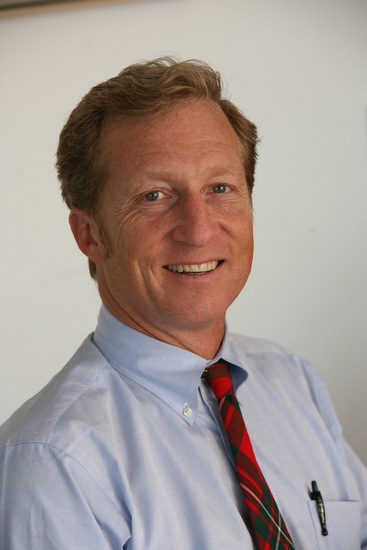
Tom Steyer, a lead advocate for a severance tax in California.

The next legislative session, California State Senator Denise Moreno Ducheny proposed Senate Bill 1, a 9.9% oil severance tax, with revenues directed towards the General Fund, excluding a specified sum to be deposited into the oil, gas, and geothermal administrative fund. Much like the preceding bill, Senate Bill 1 died in the unfinished file. Simultaneously, Professor Peter Matthews of Santa Monica Community College began circulating a proposed ballot measure to impose a severance tax. Professor Matthews successfully rallied hundreds of student volunteers to conduct mass signature gathering drives. However, the effort failed to collect the needed signatures in time. Assemblywoman Noreen Evans proposed Assembly Bill 2, a measure that would have imposed a 9.9% oil severance tax, enacted a state sales tax exemption for gas sales, repealed the 18-cent rate excise tax on gas/diesel, increased the sales tax by one-half cent, and enacted a 2.5% personal income tax surcharge. The measure successfully passed both Houses of the Legislature, reaching the Governor's desk, but was ultimately vetoed by Governor Schwarzenegger.

Assembly member Alberto Torrico introduced Assembly Bill 656, which would have imposed 12.5% severance tax, with revenues directed towards education funding. The measure died in committee.

=== 2013-2014 ===
The most recent attempt to pass a severance tax occurred in 2013, which was authored by now State Senator Noreen Evans, was Senate Bill 241, which would have imposed a 9.5% severance tax for oil and a 3.5% severance tax for natural gas. If it had passed, the revenues would have been directed to funding state parks, higher education and the general fund. Senate Bill 241 is currently on the suspense file in the Senate Appropriations Committee. During the same year, Jack Tibbetts, an undergraduate at UC Berkeley, authored and put forward a proposed ballot initiative titled as the California Modernization and Economic Development Act. Like Senate Bill 241, this initiative would have taxed oil and gas extraction at 9.5% and directed funds to higher education state parks, as well as provide subsidies to businesses to fund localized renewable energy projects. The measure earned the endorsements of many prominent figures including former US Secretary of Labor Robert Reich and Nobel laureate Dr. Daniel Kammen. The proponent of initiative later joined forces with Senator Evans and both switched their focus from gathering signatures to mobilizing students to support Senate Bill 241. Further recent developments for a severance tax in California include the support of asset manager Tom Steyer. Leading up to 2014, Steyer launched an effort to conduct public education and issue awareness, as well as lobby California legislators for the implementation of a severance tax. A poll conducted by Steyer's nonprofit organization, NextGen Climate, found that 64% of 800 likely California voters for the 2016 election support the tax.
