= Royalty payment =

Form of payment for use of artistic works or other assets

A royalty payment is a payment made by one party to another that owns a particular asset, for the right to ongoing use of that asset. Royalties are typically agreed upon as a percentage of gross or net revenues derived from the use of an asset or a fixed price per unit sold of an item of such, but there are also other modes and metrics of compensation. (Note: Attributed to multiple references:) A royalty interest is the right to collect a stream of future royalty payments.

A license agreement defines the terms under which a resource or property are licensed by one party to another, either without restriction or subject to a limitation on term, business or geographic territory, type of product, etc. License agreements can be regulated, particularly where a government is the resource owner, or they can be private contracts that follow a general structure. However, certain types of franchise agreements have comparable provisions.

== Natural resources ==
=== Subsoil minerals ===
Almost every country vests the ownership of all subsoil resources within its jurisdiction in the state. The most notable exception to this rule is the United States, where private landowners hold a right of ownership to the resources located under their properties by default (known as mineral rights). The United Nations General Assembly and the United Nations Convention on the Law of the Sea have recognized states' general and permanent right of sovereignty over natural resources within their jurisdiction.

In the United States, because landowners hold fee simple ownership of minerals located under property by default, when a firm wishes to extract these resources they must contract with individual landowners to lease access to the mineral rights owned by the landowner. These agreements are simply referred to as (e.g. oil, gas, or coal) leases and typically include a royalty to be paid to the landowners on the value of the extracted product which is then sold or used. Some states set a minimum legal royalty rate for leases. Because mineral rights are often severed from surface rights and can be split and sold at will, it is not uncommon for many individuals to be entitled to small fractional shares of royalty payments from one lease. Many states impose a severance tax whenever the minerals are extracted (severed) from the subsoil. Lands owned by the states or federal government directly can also be leased in a manner similar to other countries, and are known as state or federal leases respectively. The state or federal government would then be owed a royalty by the extracting party under the same principle as an ordinary landowner. Federally-recognized Indian tribes have been granted the right to exploit or lease mineral rights within their territory by the federal government. Offshore US federal government leasing is administered by the U.S. Secretary of the Interior pursuant to the Outer Continental Shelf Lands Act, and specifically as of July 2026, by the Marine Minerals Administration.

An example from Canada's northern territories is the federal Frontier Lands Petroleum Royalty Regulations. The royalty rate starts at 1% of gross revenues of the first 18 months of commercial production and increases by 1% every 18 months to a maximum of 5% until initial costs have been recovered, at which point the royalty rate is set at 5% of gross revenues or 30% of net revenues. In this manner risks and profits are shared between the government of Canada (as resource owner) and the petroleum developer. This attractive royalty rate is intended to encourage oil and gas exploration in the remote Canadian frontier lands where costs and risks are higher than other locations.

In many jurisdictions in North America, oil and gas royalty interests are considered real property under the NAICS classification code and qualify for a 1031 like-kind exchange.

Oil and gas royalties are paid as a set percentage on all revenue, less any deductions that may be taken by the well operator as specifically noted in the lease agreement. The revenue decimal, or royalty interest that a mineral owner receives, is calculated as a function of the percentage of the total drilling unit to which a specific owner holds the mineral interest, the royalty rate defined in that owner's mineral lease, and any tract participation factors applied to the specific tracts owned.

As a standard example, for every $100 bbl of oil sold on a U.S. federal well with a 25% royalty, the U.S. government receives $25. The U.S. government does not pay and will only collect revenues. All risk and liability lie upon the operator of the well.

=== Surface resources ===
Royalties in the lumber industry are called "stumpage".

=== Wind royalties ===
Landowners who host wind turbines are often paid wind royalties, and those nearby may be paid nuisance payments to compensate for noise and flicker effects (which refers to shadows cast by rotating turbine blades). Wind royalties are usually paid quarterly, semi-annually, or annually, and the royalty can be a flat rate or variable payment based on production or a combination of both.

Unlike oil and gas royalties, which typically decline over time, wind royalties often have an escalation clause, making them more valuable over time. Because there is not yet a robust body of law regarding wind royalties, the legal implications of severing wind rights are still unknown. Several states, including Colorado, Kansas, Oklahoma, North Dakota, South Dakota, Nebraska, Montana, and Wyoming, have enacted anti-severance statutes, preventing the wind estate from being severed from the surface. Regardless, the ownership of wind royalties and compensation payments can be transferred from the landowner to another party. Over time, wind royalties will be fractioned similarly to oil and gas royalties.

== Patents ==
An intangible asset such as a patent right gives the owner an exclusive right to prevent others from practicing the patented technology in the country issuing the patent for the term of the patent. The right may be enforced in a lawsuit for monetary damages and/or imprisonment for violation on the patent. In accordance with a patent license, royalties are paid to the patent owner in exchange for the right to practice one or more of the basic patent rights: to manufacture, to use, to sell, to offer for sale, or to import a patented product, or to perform a patented method.

Patent rights may be divided and licensed out in various ways, on an exclusive or non-exclusive basis. The license may be subject to limitations as to time or territory. A license may encompass an entire technology or it may involve a mere component or improvement on a technology.

=== United States ===
In the United States, "reasonable" royalties may be imposed, both after-the-fact and prospectively, by a court as a remedy for patent infringement. In patent infringement lawsuits, where the court determines an injunction to be inappropriate in light of the case's circumstances, the court may award "ongoing" royalties, or royalties based on the infringer's prospective use of the patented technology, as an alternative remedy. In the old days, US courts often used so-called "entire market rule" or "25% of the profits" rule. However, this practice was rejected by a federal appeals court in 1971. Instead, the courts are required now to use a holistic approach according to Georgia-Pacific Corp. v. United States Plywood Corp. decision. The decision established 15 Georgia-Pacific factors, to be considered, when determining reasonable royalty as a civil remedy (monetary compensation) for patent infringement, in the following order of importance:

1. The royalties received by the patentee for the licensing of the patent in suit, proving or tending to prove an established royalty.
2. The rates paid by the licensee for the use of other patents comparable to the patent in suit.
3. The nature and scope of the license, as exclusive or non-exclusive; or as restricted or non-restricted in terms of territory or with respect to whom the manufactured product may be sold.
4. The licensor’s established policy and marketing program to maintain his patent monopoly by not licensing others to use the invention or by granting licenses under special conditions designed to preserve that monopoly.
5. The commercial relationship between the licensor and licensee, such as, whether they are competitors in the same territory in the same line of business; or whether they are inventor and promoter.
6. The effect of selling the patented specialty in promoting sales of other products of the licensee; the existing value of the invention to the licensor as a generator of sales of his non-patented items; and the extent of such derivative or convoyed sales.
7. The duration of the patent and the term of the license.
8. The established profitability of the product made under the patent; its commercial success; and its current popularity.
9. The utility and advantages of the patent property over the old modes or devices, if any, that had been used for working out similar results.
10. The nature of the patented invention, the character of the commercial embodiment of it as owned and produced by the licensor; and the benefits to those who have used the invention.
11. The extent to which the infringer has made use of the invention; and any evidence probative of the value of that use.
12. The portion of the profit or of the selling price that may be customary in the particular business or in comparable businesses to allow for the use of the invention or analogous inventions.
13. The portion of the realizable profit that should be credited to the invention as distinguished from non-patented elements, the manufacturing process, business risks, or significant features or improvements added by the infringer.
14. The opinion testimony of qualified experts.
15. The amount that a licensor (such as the patentee) and a licensee (such as the infringer) would have agreed upon (at the time the infringement began) if both had been reasonably and voluntarily trying to reach an agreement; that is, the amount which a prudent licensee—who desired, as a business proposition, to obtain a license to manufacture and sell a particular article embodying the patented invention—would have been willing to pay as a royalty and yet be able to make a reasonable profit and which amount would have been acceptable by a prudent patentee who was willing to grant a license.

At least one study analyzing a sample of 35 cases in which a court awarded an ongoing royalty has found that ongoing royalty awards "exceed by a statistically significant amount the jury-determined reasonable royalty damages".

In 2007, patent rates within the United States were:

- a pending patent on a strong business plan, royalties of the order of 1%
- issued patent, 1%+ to 2%
- the pharmaceutical with pre-clinical testing, 2–3%

In 2002, the Licensing Economics Review found in a review of 458 licence agreements over a 16-year period an average royalty rate of 7% with a range from 0% to 50%. Not all of these agreements may have been at "arm's length". In license negotiation, firms might derive royalties for the use of a patented technology from the retail price of the downstream licensed product.

=== Muslim countries ===
In Muslim (Arab) countries, a royalty as a percentage of sales may not be appropriate, because of the prohibition of usury (see riba), and a flat fee may be preferred instead.

== Trademark ==
Trademarks are words, logos, slogans, sounds, or other distinctive expressions that distinguish the source, origin, or sponsorship of a good or service (in which they are generally known as service marks). Trade marks offer the public a means of identifying and assuring themselves of the quality of the good or service. They may bring consumers a sense of security, integrity, belonging, and a variety of intangible appeals. The value that inures to a trade mark in terms of public recognition and acceptance is known as goodwill.

A trade mark right is an exclusive right to sell or market under that mark within a geographic territory. The rights may be licensed to allow a company other than the owner to sell goods or services under the mark. A company may seek to license a trade mark it did not create to achieve instant name recognition rather than accepting the cost and risk of entering the market under its own brand that the public does not necessarily know or accept. Licensing a trade mark allows the company to take advantage of already-established goodwill and brand identification.

Like patent royalties, trade mark royalties may be assessed and divided in a variety of different ways, and are expressed as a percentage of sales volume or income, or a fixed fee per unit sold. When negotiating rates, one way companies value a trade mark is to assess the additional profit they will make from increased sales and higher prices (sometimes known as the "relief from royalty") method.

Trade mark rights and royalties are often tied up in a variety of other arrangements. Trade marks are often applied to an entire brand of products and not just a single one. Because trade mark law has as a public interest goal of the protection of a consumer, in terms of getting what they are paying for, trade mark licences are only effective if the company owning the trade mark also obtains some assurance in return that the goods will meet its quality standards. When the rights of trade mark are licensed along with a know-how, supplies, pooled advertising, etc., the result is often a franchise relationship. Franchise relationships may not specifically assign royalty payments to the trade mark licence, but may involve monthly fees and percentages of sales, among other payments.

In a long-running dispute in the United States involving the valuation of the DHL trade mark of DHL, it was reported that experts employed by the IRS surveyed a wide range of businesses and found a broad range of royalties for trade mark use from a low of 0.1% to a high of 15%.

=== Franchises ===
While a payment to employ a trade mark licence is a royalty, it is accompanied by a "guided usage manual", the use of which may be audited from time to time. However, this becomes a supervisory task when the mark is used in a franchise agreement for the sale of goods or services carrying the reputation of the mark. For a franchise, it is said, a fee is paid, even though it comprises a royalty element.

To be a franchise, the agreement must be a composite of the items:

- the right to use a trade mark to offer, sell or distribute goods or services (the trademark element)
- payment of a required royalty or fee (the fee element)
- significant assistance or control with respect to the franchisee's business (the supervisory element)

One of the above three items must not apply for the franchise agreement to be considered a trade mark agreement (and its laws and conventions). In a franchise, for which there is no convention, laws apply concerning training, brand support, operating systems/support and technical support in a written format ("Disclosure").

== Copyright ==
Copyright law gives the owner the right to prevent others from copying, creating derivative works, or using their works. Copyrights, like patent rights, can be divided in many different ways, by the right implicated, by specific geographic or market territories, or by more specific criteria. Each may be the subject of a separate license and royalty arrangements.

Copyright royalties are often very specific to the nature of work and field of endeavor. With respect to music, royalties for performance rights in the United States are set by the Library of Congress' Copyright Royalty Board. Performance rights to recordings of a performance are usually managed by one of several performance rights organizations. Payments from these organizations to performing artists are known as residuals and performance royalties. Royalty-free music provides more direct compensation to the artists. In 1999, recording artists formed the Recording Artists' Coalition to repeal supposedly "technical revisions" to American copyright statutes which would have classified all "sound recordings" as "works for hire", effectively assigning artists' copyrights to record labels.

Book authors may sell their copyright to the publisher. Alternatively, they might receive as a royalty a certain amount per book sold. It is common in the UK for example, for authors to receive a 10% royalty on book sales.

Some photographers and musicians may choose to publish their works for a one-time payment. This is known as a royalty-free license.

== Book publishing ==
All book-publishing royalties are paid by the publisher, who determines an author's royalty rate, except in rare cases in which the author can demand high advances and royalties.

For most cases, the publishers advance an amount (part of the royalty) which can constitute the bulk of the author's total income plus whatever little flows from the "running royalty" stream. Some costs may be attributed to the advance paid, which depletes further advances to be paid or from the running royalty paid. The author and the publisher can independently draw up the agreement that binds them or alongside an agent representing the author. There are many risks for the author—definition of cover price, the retail price, "net price", the discounts on the sale, the bulk sales on the POD (publish on demand) platform, the term of the agreement, audit of the publisher's accounts in case of impropriety, etc. which an agent can provide.

The following illustrates the income to an author on the basis chosen for royalty, particularly in POD, which minimizes losses from inventory and is based on computer technologies.

Book-publishing Royalties – "Net" and "Retail" Compared
	Retail Basis	Net Basis
Cover Price, $	15.00	15.00
Discount to Booksellers	50%	50%
Wholesale Price, $	7.50	7.50
Printing Cost, $ (200 pp Book)	3.50	3.50
Net Income, $	4.00	4.00
Royalty Rate	20%	20%
Royalty Calcn.	0.20x15	0.20x4
Royalty, $	3.00	0.80

Hardback royalties on the published price of trade books usually range from 10% to 12.5%, with 15% for more important authors. On paperback it is usually 7.5% to 10%, going up to 12.5% only in exceptional cases. All the royalties displayed below are on the "cover price". Paying 15% to the author can mean that the other 85% of the cost pays for editing and proof-reading, printing and binding, overheads, and the profits (if any) to the publisher.

The publishing company pays no royalty on bulk purchases of books since the buying price may be a third of the cover price sold on a singles basis.

Unlike the UK, the United States does not specify a "maximum retail price" for books that serves as base for calculation.

=== Based on net receipts ===
Methods of calculating royalties changed during the 1980s, due to the rise of retail chain booksellers, which demanded increasing discounts from publishers. As a result, rather than paying royalties based on a percentage of a book's cover price, publishers preferred to pay royalties based on their net receipts. According to The Writers' and Artists' Yearbook of 1984, under the new arrangement, "appropriate [upward] adjustments are of course made to the royalty figure and the arrangement is of no disadvantage to the author."

Despite this assurance, in 1991, Frederick Nolan, author and former publishing executive, explained that "net receipts" royalties are often more in the interest of publishers than authors:

It makes sense for the publisher to pay the author on the basis of what he receives, but it by no means makes it a good deal for the author. Example: 10,000 copies of a $20 book with a 10 percent cover-price royalty will earn him $20,000. The same number sold but discounted at 55 percent will net the publisher $90,000; the author's ten percent of that figure yields him $9,000. Which is one reason why publishers prefer "net receipts" contracts....Among the many other advantages (to the publisher) of such contracts is the fact that they make possible what is called a 'sheet deal'. In this, the (multinational) publisher of that same 10,000 copy print run, can substantially reduce his printing cost by 'running on' a further 10,000 copies (that is to say, printing but not binding them), and then further profit by selling these 'sheets' at cost-price or even lower if he so chooses to subsidiaries or overseas branches, then paying the author 10 percent of 'net receipts' from that deal. The overseas subsidiaries bind up the sheets into book form and sell at full price for a nice profit to the Group as a whole. The only one who loses is the author.

In 2003, two American authors Ken Englade and Patricia Simpson sued HarperCollins (USA) successfully for selling their work to its foreign affiliates at improperly high discounts ("Harper Collins is essentially selling books to itself, at discounted rates, upon which it then calculates the author's royalty, and then Harper Collins shares in the extra profit when the book is resold to the consumer by the foreign affiliates, without paying the author any further royalty.")

This forced a "class action" readjustment for thousands of authors contracted by HarperCollins between November 1993 and June 1999.

== Music ==
Unlike other forms of intellectual property, music royalties have a strong linkage to individuals – composers (score), songwriters (lyrics) and writers of musical plays – in that they can own the exclusive copyright to created music and can license it for performance independent of corporates. Recording companies and the performing artists that create a "sound recording" of the music enjoy a separate set of copyrights and royalties from the sale of recordings and from their digital transmission (depending on national laws).

With the advent of pop music and major innovations in technology in the communication and presentations of media, the subject of music royalties has become complex.

== Art royalties ==
=== Resale royalty or droit de suite ===
Art Resale Royalty is a right to a royalty payment upon resales of art works, that applies in some jurisdictions. Whilst there are currently approximately 60 countries that have some sort of Resale Royalty on their statute books, evidence of resale schemes that can be said to be actually operating schemes is restricted to Europe, Australia and the American state of California. For example, in May 2011 the European commissions ec.europa webpage on Resale royalty stated that, under the heading 'Indicative list of third countries (Article 7.2)' : 'A letter was sent to Member States on 1 March 2006 requesting that they provide a list of third countries which meet these requirements and that they also provide evidence of application. To date the commission has not been supplied with evidence for any third country which demonstrates that they qualify for inclusion on this list.' [The emphasis is from the European commission web page.]

Apart from placing a levy on the resale of some art-like objects, there are few common facets to the various national schemes. Most schemes prescribe a minimum amount that the artwork must receive before the artist can invoke resale rights (usually the hammer price or price). Some countries prescribe and others such as Australia, do not prescribe, the maximum royalty that can be received. Most do prescribe the calculation basis of the royalty. Some country's make the usage of the royalty compulsory. Some country's prescribe a sole monopoly collection service agency, while others like the UK and France, allow multiple agencies. Some schemes involve varying degrees of retrospective application and other schemes such as Australia's are not retrospective at all. In some cases, for example Germany, an openly tax-like use is made of the "royalties"; Half of the money collected is redistributed to fund public programs.

The New Zealand and Canadian governments have not proceeded with any sort of artist resale scheme. The Australian scheme does not apply to the first resale of artworks purchased prior to the schemes enactment( June 2010) and individual usage of the right (by Australian artists) is not compulsory. In Australia artists have a case by case right (under clause 22/23 of the Act) to refuse consent to the usage of the right by the appointed collection society and/or make their own collection arrangements. Details of the Australian scheme can be gotten from the website of the sole appointed Australian agency; The "Copyright Agency Limited".

The UK scheme is in the context of common-law countries an oddity; No other common-law country has mandated an individual economic right where actual usage of the right is compulsory for the individual right holder. Whether the common law conception of an individual economic right as an "individual right of control of usage" is compatible with the Code Civil origins of droit de suite is open to question.

The UK is the largest art resale market where a form of ARR is operating, details of how the royalty is calculated as a portion of sale price in the UK can be accessed here DACS In the UK, the scheme was, in early 2012, extended to all artists still in copyright. In most European jurisdictions the right has the same duration as the term of copyright. In California law, heirs receive royalty for 20 years.

The royalty applies to any work of graphic or plastic art such as a ceramic, collage, drawing, engraving, glassware, lithograph, painting, photograph, picture, print, sculpture, tapestry. However, a copy of a work is not to be regarded as a work unless the copy is one of a limited number made by the artist or under the artist's authority. In the UK the resale of a work bought directly from the artist and then resold within 3 years for a value of €10,000 or less is not affected by the royalty.

The situation as to how ARR applies in situations where an art work is physically made by a person or persons who are not the 'name artist' who first exhibits and sells the work is not clear. In particular whilst ARR is inalienable it seems conceivable that in cases where the copyright on an artwork is transferred/sold, prior to the first sale of an artwork, the inalienable ARR right is also effectively sold transferred.

Whether resale royalties are of net economic benefit to artists is a highly contested area. Many economic studies have seriously questioned the assumptions underlying the argument that resale royalties have net benefits to artists. Many modelings have suggested that resale royalties could be actually harmful to living artists' economic positions. Australia's chief advocate for the adoption of artist resale royalties the collection society, Viscopy, commissioned in 2004 a report from Access Economics to model the likely impact of their scheme. In the resulting report, Access Economics warned that the claim of net benefit to artists was: "based upon extremely unrealistic assumptions, in particular the assumption that seller and buyer behaviour would be completely unaffected by the introduction of RRR [ARR]" and that, "Access Economics considers that the results of this analysis are both unhelpful and potentially misleading."

== Software royalties ==
There is simply too much computer software to consider the royalties applicable to each. The following is a guide to royalty rates:

- Computer Software: 10.5% (average), 6.8% (median)
- Internet: 11.7% (average), 7.5% (median)

For the development of customer-specific software one will have to consider:

- Total software development cost
- Break-even cost (if the software can be sold to many agencies)
- Ownership of code (if the client's, they bear the development cost)
- Life of the software (usually short or requiring maintenance)
- Risk in development (high, commanding a high price)

== Other royalty arrangements ==
The term "royalty" also covers areas outside of IP and technology licensing, such as oil, gas, and mineral royalties paid to the owner of a property by a resources development company in exchange for the right to exploit the resource. In a business project the promoter, financier, LHS enabled the transaction but are no longer actively interested may have a royalty right to a portion of the income, or profits, of the business. This sort of royalty is often expressed as a contract right to receive money based on a royalty formula, rather than an actual ownership interest in the business. In some businesses this sort of royalty is sometimes called an override.

=== Alliances and partnerships ===
Royalties may exist in technological alliances and partnerships. The latter is more than mere access to secret technical or a trade right to accomplish an objective. It is, in the last decade of the past century, and the first of this one of the major means of technology transfer. Its importance for the licensor and the licensee lies in its access to markets and raw materials, and labor, when the international trend is towards globalization.

There are three main groups when it comes to technological alliances. They are Joint-ventures (sometimes abbreviated JV), the Franchises and Strategic Alliances (SA).

- Joint-ventures are usually between companies long in contact with a purpose. JVs are very formal forms of association, and depending on the country where they are situated, subject to a rigid code of rules, in which the public may or may not have an opportunity to participate in capital; partly depending on the size of capital required, and partly on Governmental regulations. They usually revolve around products and normally involve an inventive step.
- Franchises revolve around services and they are closely connected with trademarks, an example of which is McDonald's. Although franchises have no convention like trademarks or copyrights they can be mistaken as a trademark-copyright in agreements. The franchisor has close control over the franchisee, which, in legal terms cannot be tie-ins such as frachisee located in an areas owned by the franchisor.
- Strategic Alliances can involve a project (such as bridge building). a product or a service. As the name implies, is more a matter of 'marriage of convenience' when two parties want to associate to take up a particular (but modest) short-term task but generally are uncomfortable with the other. But the strategic alliance could be a test of compatibility for the forming of a joint venture company and a precedent step.

Note that all of these ventures s could be in a third county. JVs and franchises are rarely found formed within a county. They largely involve third countries.

On occasion, a JV or SA may be wholly oriented to research and development, typically involving multiple organizations working on an agreed form of engagement. The Airbus is an example of such.

==== Technical assistance and service in technology transfer ====
Firms in developing countries often are asked by the supplier of know-how or patent licensing to consider technical service (TS) and technical assistance (TA) as elements of the technology transfer process and to pay "royalty" on them. TS and TA are associated with the IP (intellectual property) transferred – and, sometimes, dependent on its acquisition – but they are, by no means, IP. TA and TS may also be the sole part of the transfer or the transferor of the IP, their concurrent supplier. They are seldom met with in the developed countries, which sometimes view even know-how as similar to TS.

TS comprises services which are the specialized knowledge of firms or acquired by them for operating a special process. It is often a "bundle" of services which can by itself meet an objective or help in meeting it. It is delivered over time, at end of which the acquirer becomes proficient to be independent of the service. In this process, no consideration is given on whether the transfer of the proprietary element has been concluded or not.

On the other hand, technical assistance is a package of assistance given on a short timetable. It can range variously from procurement of equipment for a project, inspection services on behalf of the buyer, the training of buyer's personnel and the supply technical or managerial staff. Again, TA is independent of IP services.

The payment for these services is a fee, not a royalty. The TS fee is dependent on how many of the specialized staff of its supplier are required and over what period of time. Sometimes, the "learning" capacity to whom the TS is supplied is involved. In any case, the cost per service-hour should be calculated and evaluated. Note that in selecting a TS supplier (often the IP supplier), experience and dependency are critical.

In the case of TA there is usually a plurality of firms and choice is feasible.

== Approaches to royalty rate ==
=== Intellectual property ===
The rate of royalty applied in a given case is determined by various factors, the most notable of which are:

- Market drivers and demand structure
- Territorial extent of rights
- Exclusivity of rights
- Level of innovation and stage of development (see The Technology Life Cycle)
- Sustainability of the technology
- Degree and competitive availability of other technologies
- Inherent risk
- Strategic need
- The portfolio of rights negotiated
- Fundability
- Deal-reward structure (negotiation strength)

To correctly gauge royalty rates, the following criteria must be taken into consideration:

- The transaction is at "arm's length"
- There is a willing buyer and a willing seller
- The transaction is not under compulsion

=== Rate determination and illustrative royalties ===
There are three general approaches to assess the applicable royalty rate in the licensing of intellectual property. They are

1. The Cost Approach
2. The Comparable Market Approach
3. The Income Approach

For a fair evaluation of the royalty rate, the relationship of the parties to the contract should:

– be at "arm's length" (related parties such as the subsidiary and the parent company need to transact as though they were independent parties)
– be viewed as acting free and without compulsion

==== Cost approach ====
The Cost Approach considers the several elements of cost that may have been entered to create the intellectual property and to seek a royalty rate that will recapture the expense of its development and obtain a return that is commensurate with its expected life. Costs considered could include R&D expenditures, pilot-plant and test-marketing costs, technology upgrading expenses, patent application expenditure and the like.

The method has limited utility since the technology is not priced competitively on "what the market can bear" principles or in the context of the price of similar technologies. More importantly, by lacking optimization (through additional expense), it may earn benefits below its potential.

However, the method may be appropriate when a technology is licensed out during its R&D phase as happens with venture capital investments or it is licensed out during one of the stages of clinical trials of a pharmaceutical.

In the former case, the venture capitalist obtains an equity position in the company (developing the technology) in exchange for financing a part of the development cost (recovering it, and obtaining an appropriate margin, when the company gets acquired or it goes public through the IPO route).

Recovery of costs, with opportunity of gain, is also feasible when development can be followed stage-wise as shown below for a pharmaceutical undergoing clinical trials (the licensee pays higher royalties for the product as it moves through the normal stages of its development):

Success State of development	Royalty rates (%)	Nature
Pre-clinical success	0–5	in-vitro
Phase I (safety)	5–10	100 healthy people
Phase II (efficacy)	8–15	300 subjects
Phase III (effectiveness)	10–20	several thousand patients
Launched product	20+	regulatory body approval

A similar approach is used when custom software is licensed (an in-license, i.e. an incoming license). The product is accepted on a royalty schedule depending on the software meeting set stage-wise specifications with acceptable error levels in performance tests.

==== Comparable market approach ====
Here the cost and the risk of development are disregarded. The royalty rate is determined from comparing competing or similar technologies in an industry, modified by considerations of useful "remaining life" of the technology in that industry and contracting elements such as exclusivity provisions, front-end royalties, field of use restrictions, geographic limitations and the "technology bundle" (the mix of patents, know-how, trade-mark rights, etc.) accompanying it. Economist J. Gregory Sidak explains that comparable licenses, when selected correctly, "reveal what the licensor and the licensee consider to be fair compensation for the use of the patented technology" and thus "will most accurately depict the price that a licensee would willingly pay for that technology." The Federal Circuit has on numerous occasions confirmed that the comparable market approach is a reliable methodology to calculate a reasonable royalty.

Although widely used, the prime difficulty with this method is obtaining access to data on comparable technologies and the terms of the agreements that incorporate them. Fortunately, there are several recognized organizations (see "Royalty Rate Websites" listed at the end of this article) who have comprehensive information on both royalty rates and the principal terms of the agreements of which they are a part. There are also IP-related organizations, such as the Licensing Executives Society, which enable its members to access and share privately assembled data.

The two tables shown below are drawn, selectively, from information that is available with an IP-related organization and on-line. The first depicts the range and distribution of royalty rates in agreements. The second shows the royalty rate ranges in select technology sectors (latter data sourced from: Dan McGavock of IPC Group, Chicago, USA).

Royalty Distribution Analysis in Industry
Industry	Licenses (nos.)	Min. Royalty,%	Max. Royalty,%	Average,%	Median,%
Automotive	35	1.0	15.0	4.7	4.0
Computers	68	0.2	15.0	5.2	4.0
Consumer Gds	90	0.0	17.0	5.5	5.0
Electronics	132	0.5	15.0	4.3	4.0
Healthcare	280	0.1	77.0	5.8	4.8
Internet	47	0.3	40.0	11.7	7.5
Mach.Tools.	84	0.5	26	5.2	4.6
Pharma/Bio	328	0.1	40.0	7.0	5.1
Software	119	0.0	70.0	10.5	6.8

Royalty Rate Segmentation in Some Technology Sectors
Industry	0–2%	2–5%	5–10%	10–15%	15–20%	20–25%
Aerospace	50%	50%				
Chemical	16.5%	58.1%	24.3%	0.8%	0.4%	
Computer	62.5%	31.3%	6.3%			
Electronics		50.0%	25.0%	25.0%		
Healthcare	3.3%	51.7%	45.0%			
Pharmaceuticals	23.6%	32.1%	29.3%	12.5%	1.1%	0.7%
Telecom	40.0%	37.3%	23.6%			

Commercial sources also provide information that is invaluable for making comparisons. The following table provides typical information that is obtainable, for instance, from Royaltystat:

Sample License Parameters

Reference: 7787    Effective Date: 1 October 1998
SIC Code: 2870   SEC Filed Date: 26 July 2005
SEC Filer: Eden Bioscience Corp    Royalty Rate: 2.000 (%)
SEC Filing: 10-Q    Royalty Base: Net Sales
Agreement Type: Patent   Exclusive: Yes
Licensor: Cornell Research Foundation, Inc.
Licensee: Eden Bioscience Corp.
Lump-Sum Pay: Research support is $150,000 for 1 year.
Duration: 17-year(s)
Territory: Worldwide

Coverage : Exclusive patent license to make, have made, use and sell products incorporating biological materials, including genes, proteins and peptide fragments, expression systems, cells, and antibodies, for the field of plant disease

The comparability between transactions requires a comparison of the significant economic conditions that may affect the contracting parties:

- Similarity of geographies
- Relevant date
- Same industry
- Market size and its economic development;
- Contracting or expanding markets
- Market activity: whether wholesale, retail, other
- Relative market shares of contracting entities
- Location-specific costs of production and distribution
- Competitive environment in each geography
- Fair alternatives to contracting parties

==== Income approach ====
The Income approach focuses on the licensor estimating the profits generated by the licensee and obtaining an appropriate share of the generated profit. It is unrelated to costs of technology development or the costs of competing technologies.

The approach requires the licensee (or licensor): (a) to generate a cash-flow projection of incomes and expenses over the life-span of the license under an agreed scenario of incomes and costs (b) determining the Net Present Value, NPV of the profit stream, based on a selected discount factor, and c) negotiating the division of such profit between the licensor and the licensee.

The NPV of a future income is always lower than its current value because an income in the future is attended by risk. In other words, an income in the future needs to be discounted, in some manner, to obtain its present equivalent. The factor by which a future income is reduced is known as the 'discount rate'. Thus, $1.00 received a year from now is worth $0.9091 at a 10% discount rate, and its discounted value will be still lower two years down the line.

The actual discount factor used depends on the risk assumed by the principal gainer in the transaction. For instance, a mature technology worked in different geographies, will carry a lower risk of non-performance (thus, a lower discount rate) than a technology being applied for the first time. A similar situation arises when there is the option of working the technology in one of two different regions; the risk elements in each region would be different.

The method is treated in greater detail, using illustrative data, in Royalty Assessment.

The licensor's share of the income is usually set by the "25% rule of thumb", which is said to be even used by tax authorities in the US and Europe for arm's-length transactions. The share is on the operating profit of the licensee firm. Even where such division is held contentious, the rule can still be the starting point of negotiations.

Following are three aspects that are important for the profit:

(a) the profit that accrues to the licensee may not arise solely through the engine of the technology. There are returns from the mix of assets it employs such as fixed and working capital and the returns from intangible assets such as distribution systems, trained workforce, etc. Allowances need to be made for them.

(b) profits are also generated by thrusts in the general economy, gains from infrastructure, and the basket of licensed rights – patents, trademark, know-how. A lower royalty rate may apply in an advanced country where large market volumes can be commanded, or where protection to the technology is more secure than in an emerging economy (or perhaps, for other reasons, the inverse).

(c) the royalty rate is only one aspect of the negotiation. Contractual provisions such as an exclusive license, rights to sub-license, warranties on the performance of technology etc. may enhance the advantages to the licensee, which is not compensated by the 25% metric.

The basic advantage of this approach, which is perhaps the most widely applied, is that the royalty rate can be negotiated without comparative data on how other agreements have been transacted. In fact, it is almost ideal for a case where precedent does not exist.

It is, perhaps, relevant to note that the IRS also uses these three methods, in modified form, to assess the attributable income, or division of income, from a royalty-based transaction between a US company and its foreign subsidiary (since US law requires that a foreign subsidiary pay an appropriate royalty to the parent company).

=== Other compensation modes ===
Royalties are only one among many ways of compensating owners for use of an asset. Others include:

- buying the asset outright, possibly with a leaseback arrangement
- offering the licensor an equity position in the licensee company
- staged milestone payments (as in drug development and commissioned software arrangements)
- lump sum payment made to the licensor in one or more installments
- cross-licensing agreements with or without cash payments, and
- entering into a strategic alliance or Joint Venture.

In discussing the licensing of Intellectual Property, the terms valuation and evaluation need to be understood in their rigorous terms. Evaluation is the process of assessing a license in terms of the specific metrics of a particular negotiation, which may include its circumstances, the geographical spread of licensed rights, product range, market width, licensee competitiveness, growth prospects, etc.

On the other hand, valuation is the fair market value (FMV) of the asset – trademark, patent or know-how – at which it can be sold between a willing buyer and willing seller in the context of best awareness of circumstances. The FMV of the IP, where assessable, may itself be a metric for evaluation.

If an emerging company is listed on the stock market, the market value of its intellectual property can be estimated from the data of the balance sheet using the equivalence:

Market Capitalization = Net Working capital + Net Fixed assets + Routine Intangible assets + IP

where the IP is the residual after deducting the other components from the market valuation of the stock. One of the most significant intangibles may be the work-force.

The method may be quite useful for valuing trademarks of a listed company if it is mainly or the only IP in play (franchising companies).

=== Royalty Rate Assessment ===
Royalty rate assessment is a practical tool to gauge the impact of a royalty commitment in a technology contract on the business interests of the contracting parties. In this coverage, the terms 'royalty', 'royalty rate' and 'royalties' are used interchangeably.

A firm with valuable Intellectual Property IP by having spent sums of money to develop manufacturing know-how, patents, or a trademark, can be expected to not only employ it for gain but to seek, by licensing it out: (a) to recoup part of the expenditure incurred on development (b) achieve such in the shortest period and (c) attempt to obtain a profit from each of the markets in which the IP will be employed to the gain of the licensee.

A licensee under the IP, on the other hand, risks (a) the potential loss of capital that would be invested for working the license (b) the adequacy and protection of the rights licensed and (c) the uncertainties of any marketplace. The licensee's objective would, thus, be to minimize exposure to the costs and the performance of the technology.

This contest in objectives will normally be settled by a compromise of expectations. One of the key elements of this process is the royalty applied, amplified here. The royalty is not a single separate element but is a composite of the rate, the length of time over which it applies, the unit base of its calculation, the 'remaining life' of the licensed right (for instance, the balance life of a patent), supportive assistance and other contractual obligations. Other license metrics, such as exclusionary rights modify the rate.

But fundamental to this exercise, to both the parties do a contract, is the competitiveness of the product, process, service or like entity. If there are rival products or services available to the licensee, or if there are more favorable markets for the licensor, the compromising equation changes in context.

The cost to the licensor in developing a technology, the cost of building the value of a trademark or the normal market risks of the licensee in the choice of product, and concomitant capital costs, are not generally part of the compromise equation, significant as these factors may be to each of the negotiating parties. However, such costs do become pertinent when a technology is licensed out before its maturity (see The Technology Life Cycle).

==== Typical Royalty Rates ====
'Typical royalties' are historically applied royalty rates. To understand the concept of 'typical royalties' one must infer that the term 'royalty' originally applied to the 'share of the proceeds' that the Crown demanded of its subjects for any exploitation of the assets owned by the Crown, for instance, mines, shipping lanes, geographic territories and the like. Besides the implication of sharing the proceeds of an operation, the payment of royalty was expressly an acknowledgment that the exploited property remained in the hands of the Crown; in other words, any exploitation was by a way of lease or franchise and not through sharing or transfer of ownership. Today this concept carries over to the absolute ownership of property in Intellectual Property rights (IPR), whether that resides in a product, process or system by a government, corporation or like entity.

Where there is a lack of knowledge of the analytical concepts in royalty, the general tendency is to use mineral mining royalties as a base reference. Historically, royalties in the region of 1.0 to 3.0% have prevailed, the unit-base being 'sales value' of the exploited product. Little consideration is given to the character of the product or process being licensed, the nature and profitability of the marketplace or the 'remaining life' of the licensed entity. In a slightly modified form, typical rates applied in the industry to which the product belongs are used; for instance, in the textiles, chemicals or auto-component industries.

As will be seen shortly, such arbitrary negotiation of royalty rates holds danger for both the proprietor/licensor of technology and its user/licensee. In a poorly profitable market, the licensee stands to lose disproportionately, and in a very profitable market, the licensor.

==== Royalty rate as profit share ====
To start with, a very simple illustration is provided to describe the profit-sharing concept, which will be expanded upon subsequently. (See Guidelines for Evaluation of Transfer of Technology Agreements, United Nations, New York, 1979, pp 40).

Any enterprise marketing a product would expect to obtain a profit which is some percentage of its sales price. If the product arises from working a license, then its licensor would want to share a part of that profit. (The licensed product can be expected to command a higher price in the marketplace than its competitor by virtue of higher yield, lower cost, better quality, convenience or other factors). In the discussion below, the royalty term that is illustrated is 'royalty on sales' with the sale involving one unit of product. (Other forms of royalty are discussed later).

Arithmetically, royalty (on sales) can be expressed as:

Royalty = Payment-to-licensor/Product-sales-price

or re-expressed as

Royalty = Licensor-profit/Product-sales-price

or as

Royalty = Licensor-profit/Enterprise-profit x Enterprise-profit/Product-sales-price

or more formally as

  ROS = LSEP x POS    (A)

where:

ROS = Royalty on Sales price
LSEP = Licensor's Share of Enterprise Profit
POS = Profit on Sales (price)

Thus, if a licensor wants to receive a 30% share of the enterprise's (licensee's) profit (LSEP) on a product that sells for $5, and on which the licensor estimates the licensee's profit on sale (POS) would be $1.50 or 30% (POS=$1.5/$5.0=30%), the licensor would negotiate to apply a royalty rate (ROS) of 9% on the sales price (LSEP=30% of $1.50 or $0.45; $0.45/$5=9%).

(The terms 'price' and 'profit' as used here are undefined; they will receive greater precision in later discussion).

Expression (A) above can be re-expressed as:

     LSEP = ROS/POS      (B) or in the example: 30% = 9%/30%

It exhibits an important facet of the royalty rate concept. For a given royalty rate (i.e. ROS), the licensor obtains a greater percentage of the profit on the product the lower the profitability of the product (and, vice versa, the enterprise gives away a smaller share of the profit to the licensor for a product of high profitability).

It is important to differentiate between the percentage share of the licensor in the profit from the percentage royalty rate which is its most common form of statement.

==== Royalty rate and the technology turnover concept ====
A more elegant - and algebraic - way of looking at royalty payments is to attempt some form of consolidation of the quantitative variables in a licensing proposal (See Manual on Technology Transfer Negotiation, United Nations Industrial Development Organization, Vienna, Austria, 1996 pp.256, 1996).

Table A demonstrates one form of consolidation.

It takes the case of a technology license where the royalty rate is 4% on sales value over 5 years, with rights to the licensee to continue operations beyond that period without further payment obligations. For purposes of illustration, it is assumed that the annual sales volume and production cost are constant (later discussion allows for year-to-year changes):

Table A. Schematic of Incomes and Cost Flows
Unit:'$000
Year	1	2	3-5	6
Sales	100	100	100	100
Cost of Production	40	40	40	40
Royalty Due,R	4	4	4	0
Total Cost	44	44	44	40
Operating Profit OP_{R}	56	56	56	60 OP

It is evident that in the 6th year, the Operating Profit of the enterprise increases by $4000.

The higher value of the Operating Profit in the 6th year would not be apparent if assessment was limited to the first 5 years of royalty commitment.

Algebraically,

 LSEP = R/(OPR+R)   - C

where:
LSEP is the licensor's share of licensee's profit (see Expression A above)
R is the absolute amount of royalty paid
OP_{R} is the profit-before-tax during the royalty-applicable period

Expression C can be rewritten as:

 LSEP = 1/ (1 + OPR/R) - D

or as

 LSEP = 1 / (1+TTF)     - E

where TTF is defined as the Technology Turnover Factor. It is a measure of the profit or return that the enterprise obtains for a unit of royalty payment - the profit accelerator. A high TTF implies a lower share of enterprise profit flows to the licensor (and conversely, a higher share to the licensor when the TTF is small). The evaluation of Expression E and that of TTF provide estimates of commitments to the technology-offering party in accepting a license at a particular royalty rate (and a base for negotiations).

Expression C also defines the term 'profit' for this analysis; it is the profit before tax during the royalty-bearing period and not that of the post-royalty period. Thus, taxation rates do not come into play and it is possible to evaluate the impact of royalties independent of territory.

Of course, in normal business practice, royalty rates take on different forms, while sales, costs and profits vary from year to year. Unless they can be consolidated to single numbers, the practical use of Expressions (D) and (E) would not be feasible. This can be done by converting all cash flows to their 'Present Value'.

===== The 'Present Value' method of capitalizing flows =====
The concept of Present Value is routinely used in financial analysis of projects to make a selection where there are alternative financing modalities or to assess incomes/expenditures in the context of different risk projections. Its objective is to capitalize variously distributed incomes and costs by 'discounting' them to their 'present value' (PV). That is, an income at a future date has a lower certainty than an immediate income by its assumed rate of risk.

If $0.9091 is banked today at an interest rate of 10%, its value at the end of a year would be $1.00. Conversely, $1.00 received (or spent) one year from now is equivalent to its Present Value of $0.9091. It is said that the discounted value of $1.00 one year from now is equal to $0.9091 at a discount rate of 10%. Similarly, $0.8264 is the PV of $1.00 receivable two years from today at the 10% rate.

The term 'interest rate' used above is an approximation for the economist's discount rate (see below). It is not the inflation rate or the bank rate but the latter are parts of it.

The discount factors (DF) of 0.9091,0.8264, etc. are generated from the 'compound interest' formula:

DF = 1/ (1+ r)^{n}

where

r is the discount rate
n is the forward year from current day = 0

It then becomes possible to reformulate a stream of profits and royalties to their PVs. The sum of PVs results in the Net Present Value (NPV).

Only OP_{R} and R for each year are needed to obtain LSEP and TTF.

Table B illustrates this methodology for evaluating the projected LSEP of an enterprise, where royalty has been made applicable for a period of 5 years. The discount rate applied is 10%.

Table B. Illustrative Projected Flows of OP and Royalty of an Enterprise [Unit:$000]
Year	1	2	3	4	5
Sales	700	900	1200	1600	2200
OP_{R}	75	105	130	200	280
Royalty	60	36	48	64	88
Discount Factor,10%	0.9091	0.8264	0.7531	0.6830	0.6209
Discounted OP_{R}	68.2	86.8	97.7	136.6	173.9
Discounted R	54.5	29.8	36.1	43.7	54.6

The NPVs of OP_{R} and R are $563,100 and $218,700, respectively, and thus, the projected LSEP is 0.28 i.e. the licensee shares 28% of the profits of the enterprise with the licensor over the five-year period. Profit projection data is made by the licensee and would not be generally known to the licensor, and thus, the asking royalty of 4% on sales becomes the licensor's bench-mark for negotiation.

The sales value data shown in the table is not relevant to the calculation of LSEP. It is, however, an estimation the licensor would need to know or make to evolve a suitable royalty rate. A 4% royalty on sales value for a 5-year period of the license, together with a lump-sum payment of $32000 (risk-free income) on execution of the license is then the 'asking price' in the example.

The TTF of this projection is 2.6, implying that for every dollar of royalty paid, the OP to the licensee enterprise is multiplied by this factor.

Normal project calculations look beyond the royalty-bearing period evaluating both the NPV and the <IRR> Internal rate of return of the enterprise.

===== The discount rate =====
The 'discount rate' used in capitalization of flows estimates the element of accepting risk in the projection of costs and incomes. Without risk, the future income is a certainty. In a live environment, risks arise from unexpected competition, infringement, invalidation and loss of trade secrets, political and economic risks, etc. This affects both parties to the contract. In the presence of such risks, discount rates are higher than the bank interest rate and are based on the expected Beta coefficient - the dependence of a risk in one aspect to the risk in another. With high discount rates, sales that occur far in the future have little effect on the expected incomes.

Typically, risk is assumed at 10%. Whether the actual risk is higher or lower than this figure becomes a factor of the negotiation process; for instance, the seller of a technology may consider the risk of obsolescence low whereas the opposite party may consider it high.

==== Royalty rate expressions ====
Royalty in license agreements is always in consideration of something that is provided by the licensor to the licensee in the agreement, such as the right to use a trademark, patent, know-how, designs, drawings or a combination of them.

Royalty payments take three basic forms:

- 'running' royalties
- 'lumpsum' royalty
- running royalties together with lump-sum royalties

Any payment should be related to:

- the specific entity of the license that bears the royalty
- the unit-base on which the royalty is applicable (e.g. per kilogram of product)
- the period over which payments are due
- when the payments have to be made, currency and transaction mode
- the mutual obligations of the licensor and licensee in relation to the entity.

For instance in a product licensing agreement, the licensee may be called upon to pay a lumpsum royalty of $100,000 on execution of agreement together with royalty of 4% of the 'net sales value' for all licensed products for a period of 6 years, commencing 2 years from the date of starting production.

The selection of the royalty base should not be arbitrary. Each form of compensation has advantages and disadvantages to the contracting parties. What follows is a just an introduction.

Running Royalties

Running royalties are predominantly used in patent, trademark and franchise licensing since they can theoretically be exploited without any other inputs from the licensor once the license has been executed.

Where there is only one product, the royalty base can be either the number of units produced or sold (the distinction is significant) or the 'sales value' (sales realization) of the product. Where the term 'sales value' is the base unit, it has to be very strictly defined; whether it is the 'gross sales value' or 'net sales value' (NSV), and if the latter, what components of the price need to be subtracted (for instance, packing cost, sales taxes, transportation costs, etc.). NSV is predominantly used when there are a multiplicity of products made or processed in some way (say, various thicknesses of plate glass in a glass-manufacturing license).

In some circumstances there may be minimum and maximum (cut-off) royalty stipulations. Minimum royalties are used when there is a possibility that the licensee may not work the license to its full benefit or is incorporated as an incentive to work the technology to the full. The maximum or cut-off royalty can be negotiated when the licensor agrees that a cumulative amount will satisfy the objectives of license; once the limit is reached, no further royalties become due. An alternative is the incorporation of reducing royalties if large volumes are expected in the future.

Lumpsum Royalties

Lumpsum royalties are most often encountered when the principal contribution of the licensor is providing formulae, documentation, designs and the like. That is, once the transmission of the latter is completed, the licensor has no involvement with the licensee so long as the caveats and rights of the license are respected. In some cases, the lumpsum merely represents the 'capitalization' (PV) of a part of the running royalties.

Combined Lumpsum and Running Royalties

This combination of royalties is met with in 'technology contracts' where more than one form of intellectual property is licensed out combined, possibly, with a know-how license, and in many cases, with a straight know-how license alone.

Where the transfer of know-how is solely the province of contract, the lumpsum often works as 'insurance' against misuse of know-how by the licensee, since there is no protective statute for it (unlike with patents and trademarks), while the 'running royalty' can be insurance for the licensee in that the licensor would provide inputs so as to maximize income (thus to the benefit of both). Alternatively, the running payments may be to spread an otherwise lumpsum component.

==== Technical assistance fees ====
In many contracts involving the use of know-how (and associated IP), 'technical assistance' may be encountered as a part of the contractual process, particularly in developing country contracts. The assistance comprises services which are not in the nature of IP but are needed by the licensee to accomplish its objectives. They are of a specialized nature linked to the know-how, for instance, procurement of equipment, the setup of a production facility or training of licensee personnel, on-site and off-site. These costs would bear no relationship to the royalties, although they are most often provided by the licensor. (See *Licensing Guide For Developing Countries', World Intellectual Property Organization (WIPO), 1977, Section H).

The cost of such services arises from delineating the skill-mix and 'man'-hours of effort involved (domestic and expatriate personnel) and providing for supervision overhead. The costs of different skills is in the public domain and can be readily estimated. The overhead percentage, however, is a negotiated element.

== See also ==
- AuthorShare a system for charging royalties for the second hand sale of books and other media.
- Celebrity bond
- Copyright transfer agreement
- Payola
- Revenue based financing
- Royalty-free
- United States energy law
