= Severance tax =

Taxes imposed on removal of natural resources

Severance taxes are taxes imposed on the removal of natural resources within a taxing jurisdiction. Severance taxes are most commonly imposed in oil producing states within the United States. Resources that typically incur severance taxes when extracted include oil, natural gas, coal, uranium, and timber. Some jurisdictions use other terms like gross production tax.

Note that severance taxes are used in jurisdictions where most resource extraction occurs on privately owned land and/or where sub-surface minerals are privately owned (for example, the United States). Where the resources are publicly owned to begin with (for example, in most Commonwealth and European Union countries), it is not a tax but rather a resource royalty that is paid. In the case of the forestry industry, this royalty is called "stumpage".

== Oil and natural gas ==
Severance taxes are set and collected at the state level. States usually calculate the tax based on the value and/or volume produced; sometimes the method differs for oil, natural gas, and condensates. Production from certain wells may be exempt from severance tax based on the amount of production (i.e. "stripper" wells) or the type of well (i.e. horizontal, tertiary, deep, etc). As of 2021, 34 states collect a severance tax on oil and gas extraction.

As of September 2022, the Colorado severance tax was 1% of the gross income from oil and gas owed.

== Incentives ==
Severance tax incentives may be given in the form of credits or lower tax rates in order to encourage the production and expansion of oil and gas operations.

== Endowments ==
Several U.S. states, including New Mexico, Wyoming, Colorado, Alaska and Montana, have created severance endowments. These range in size from about $800 million in Montana to more than $37 billion in Alaska. In theory, income from these permanent endowments remains available in perpetuity after resources are no longer being extracted, and is generally used to support public education and other public programs.

== See also ==
- Natural resources consumption tax
- Severance tax legislative history in California
- Stumpage
