= U.S. Coalition for Fair Lumber Imports =

The U.S. Coalition for Fair Lumber Imports is a lobby group in the United States that has protested against alleged subsidies the Government of Canada has given members of its pulp and paper industry.
