= Land ownership in Canada =

Land is owned in Canada by governments, Indigenous groups, corporations, and individuals. Canada is the second-largest country in the world by total area, covering 9,984,670 km^{2} (3,855,100 sq mi), of which 9,093,507 km^{2} (3,511,023 sq mi) is land and 891,163 km^{2} (344,080 sq mi) is freshwater.

== Crown lands ==
The majority of all lands in Canada are held by governments as public land and are known as Crown lands. About 89% of Canada's land area (8,886,356 km^{2}) is Crown land, which may either be federal (41%) or provincial (48%); the remaining 11% is privately owned. Most federally administered land is in the Canadian territories (Northwest Territories, Nunavut and Yukon), and is administered on behalf of Aboriginal Affairs and Northern Development Canada; only 4% of land in the provinces is federally controlled, largely in the form of National Parks, Indian reserves, or Canadian Forces bases. In contrast, provinces hold much of their territory as provincial Crown land, which may be held as Provincial Parks or wilderness.

The largest class of landowners are the provincial governments, who hold all unclaimed land in their jurisdiction. Over 90% of the sprawling boreal forest of Canada is provincial Crown land. Provincial lands account for 60% of the area of the province of Alberta, 94% of the land in British Columbia, 95% of Newfoundland and Labrador, and 48% of New Brunswick.

The largest single landowner in Canada by far, and by extension one of the world's largest, is the Government of Canada. The bulk of the federal government's lands are in the vast northern territories where Crown lands are vested in the federal, rather than territorial, government. These lands, including offshore areas, are also known as "frontier lands", where the federal government holds the right to dispose of or exploit the natural resources. In addition the federal government owns national parks, First Nations reserves and national defence installations.

Until the Natural Resources Acts of 1930 the prairie provinces of Alberta, Saskatchewan, and Manitoba, and to a limited extent British Columbia, did not control Crown lands or subsoil rights within their boundaries, which instead rested with the federal government. This deprived them of the benefits of royalties from mining, oil and gas, or forestry (stumpage) within their boundaries. This was a major source of Western alienation at the time.

== History of land distribution ==
In New France land was settled according to the seigneurial system, which was similar to the type of late feudalism practised in France at the time, and land was divided into long strip lots running back from the riverfront. This land pattern was also used in certain areas of Western Canada by French and Métis settlers.

In contrast, areas of British settlement used square block patterns of land distribution. Those in Eastern Canada contoured around geographical features and consisted of smaller lots. In Western Canada, where the American-influenced Dominion Land Survey was used, geographical features were largely ignored in favour of geometric standardization, with larger lots.

In Canadian law all lands are subject to the Crown, and this has been true since Britain acquired much of Eastern Canada from France by the Treaty of Paris (1763). However, the British and Canadian authorities recognized that indigenous peoples already on the lands had a prior claim, aboriginal title, which was not extinguished by the arrival of the Europeans. This is in direct contrast to the situation in Australia where the continent was declared terra nullius, or vacant land, and was seized from Aboriginal peoples without compensation. In consequence, all of Canada, save a section of southern Quebec exempted by the Royal Proclamation of 1763, is subject to Aboriginal title. Native groups historically negotiated treaties in which they traded tenure to the land for annuities and certain legal exemptions and privileges. Most of Western Canada was secured in this way by the government via the Numbered Treaties of 1871 to 1921, though not all groups signed treaties. In particular, in most of British Columbia Aboriginal title has never been transferred to the Crown. Many native groups, both those that have never signed treaties or those that are dissatisfied with the execution of treaties have made formal Aboriginal land claims against the government.

The English Crown also gave tenure to much of Canada to a private company, the Hudson's Bay Company (HBC) which from 1670 to 1870 had a legal and economic monopoly on all land in the Rupert's Land territory (identical to the drainage basin of Hudson Bay), and later the Columbia District and the North-Western Territory (now British Columbia, the Yukon, the Northwest Territories, and Nunavut) were added to the HBC's lands, making it one of the largest private landowners in world history. In 1868 the Imperial Parliament passed the Rupert's Land Act that saw most of its land ownership transferred to the Dominion of Canada.

After Canada acquired the HBC's land in 1870, the federal government used the land as an economic tool to promote settlement and development. Under the Dominion Lands Act system of 1872, 25,000,000 acres were given to the Canadian Pacific Railway to fund its transcontinental line, other areas were reserved for school boards to be sold to fund education, and the rest was distributed to settlers for agriculture. Settlers paid a $10 fee and agreed to make some improvements within a specified time for 160 acres (65 ha), commonly known as a quarter section, of land. This was at a time of extreme land shortage in many agricultural areas of Europe, and aided in the rapid settlement of Western Canada. In areas where ranching was preferred to field agriculture (e.g. southern Alberta), large areas were leased to cattle barons at a nominal rate, allowing the development of an industrial-scale beef export industry centred on the city of Calgary.

At the same time, major land reforms were underway in Prince Edward Island to end the practice of absentee landlordism, which locals felt exploited them. The Government of Canada agreed to provide the Island with an $800,000 fund to purchase the remaining absentee landlord's estates as part of negotiations that brought PEI into Confederation.

== Subsurface rights ==
At common law, the owner of the land owned both the surface and the sub-surface, namely minerals. The only exception to this was that the Crown held the precious minerals (gold and silver), and any treasure-trove. That was the pattern of land ownership in the earliest British settlements in what is now eastern Canada. When the Crown granted land to settlers, the land grant normally included all minerals, other than precious minerals. The result is that in Ontario, Quebec, and the four Atlantic provinces, much of the mineral rights are privately owned.

The situation changed as settlement progressed westwards. The federal government initially retained all lands in Rupert's Land and the North-Western Territory, unlike the situation in eastern Canada, where the provinces held Crown lands and could make land grants. The federal Crown's ownership of the land in western Canada included the power to grant land titles, and also the power to determine if minerals would be included in the land grants.

In the grants to the first two major corporations in the west, the Hudson's Bay Company and the Canadian Pacific Railway Company, the federal government generally included minerals in the land grants. As settlement progressed, the federal government came to realise the value of the mineral rights, and began to reserve classes of minerals in subsequent land grants: first, just precious minerals; then reservations of coal; and finally land grants would reserve "all minerals unto the Crown." When the federal government finally transferred the natural resources to the three Prairie provinces in 1930, the provincial governments received the benefits of those mineral reservations.

Even when the land grant included minerals, as was the case with the land grants to the Canadian Pacific Railway Company and the Hudson's Bay Company, those land-holders could sell the surface rights to agricultural settlers, while retaining the mineral rights themselves. Like the federal government, the Canadian Pacific Railway Company initially sold the land with minerals to farm settlers, but then gradually came to realise the value of the minerals, and began to retain minerals, only selling the surface to settlers.

The result, particularly in western Canada, is that the Crown, corporations, First Nations, or individuals may be the owner of the mineral rights for a particular plot of land, separate from the owner of the surface rights. Careful examination of the title is therefore necessary to determine who owns the mineral rights to a particular piece of land. For example, in the leading petroleum-producing province of Alberta, 81% of the subsurface mineral rights are owned by the provincial Crown. The remaining 19% are owned by the federal Crown, individuals, or corporations.

When the ownership of the surface and the minerals are split between two different owners, the owners of the minerals cannot extract them in a way that damages the surface, for example by undercutting support of the surface. At the same time, the surface holder cannot prevent the owner of the minerals from accessing their minerals. Most provinces, such as Alberta, have passed legislation to govern these competing rights. Disputes between owners of the surface and owners of the mineral rights are adjudicated by the Land and Property Rights Tribunal.

== Characteristics of modern distribution ==
Canada may be considered distinct from the few large landed estates and masses of tenant farmers typical of Old World and Latin American countries that have not enacted land reforms, the communal and state ownership typical of Communist countries, or the small-holdings in those parts of Europe and Latin America where the estates were broken up.

== Recent trends ==
In the last century, the trend in Canada has been for a smaller percentage of people to own land, as more urbanization has turned people into renters. Still Canada has one of the world's highest rates of home ownership, which actually increased during the economic boom of the mid 2000s. In 2006, of Canada's 12.4 million households, more than 8.5 million (68.4%) owned their homes, the highest homeownership rate recorded since 1971. Much of the recent increases were in the form of condominiums, however, which are not land ownership in the traditional sense. In 1981, less than 4% of owner households owned condominiums. By 2001, this proportion had more than doubled to 9%, and by 2006, it had reached 10.9%. Again, this reflects the impact of urbanization which has changed land holding patterns substantially.

In rural areas, the trend has been towards commercial farming operations. The number of farms has continually decreased since the end of the pioneering era in Western Canada (as recently as the 1930s in some regions, but more generally 1914), and at the same time, farm sizes have increased. This along with the phasing out of national passenger rail on the lines that serviced the Canadian Prairies, threatened established transportation links and the economic activities that depended on them. A recent trend toward greenbelt housing, cottages, acreages, and hobby farms has been fueled by an abundance of jobs in the oil & gas sector, speculation due to a rise of agricultural GDP in recent years and the cost of urban real estate that may in cases justify daily commuting to nearby cities particularly with the reintroduction of passenger rail as well as other modes of public transit.

== See also ==
- Landholder
- Patterns of landholding: Feudalism / Smallholding / Commune / Sharecropping
