= 1944 New Year Honours =

British royal recognitions

The 1944 New Year Honours were appointments by many of the Commonwealth realms of King George VI to various orders and honours to reward and highlight good works by citizens of those countries. They were announced on 31 December 1943.

The recipients of honours are displayed here as they were styled before their new honour.

== Baron ==
- Charles George Ammon, Esq., J.P., D.L., M.P., Member of Parliament for North Camberwell, February, 1922, to October, 1931, and since November, 1935. Parliamentary Secretary to the Admiralty, 1924, and 1929–1931. For political and public services.
- Colonel The Right Honourable John Gretton, C.B.E., J.P., D.L., Member of Parliament for South Derbyshire, 1895–1906; for Rutland, 1907–1918; and for the Burton Division of Staffordshire, 1918–1943. For political and public services.
- Sir Thomas Royden, Bt., C.H., J.P., D.L., Chairman, London, Midland and Scottish Railway Company. For public services.
- Colonel Sir Courtauld Thomson, K.B.E., C.B. For philanthropic and public services.
- William Westwood, Esq., O.B.E., F.R.S.A., J.P., President of the Engineering and Shipbuilding Trades Federation, 1933–1936; President of the Confederation of Shipbuilding and Engineering Unions, 1936–1939. Chief Industrial Adviser to the Admiralty.

== Privy Council ==
- Ralph Assheton, Esq., M.P., Financial Secretary to the Treasury. Parliamentary Secretary, Ministry of Labour and National Service, 1939–1942; Parliamentary Secretary, Ministry of Supply, 1942–1943. Member of Parliament for the Rushcliffe Division of Nottingham since 1934.
- Sir Archibald John Kerr Clark Kerr, G.C.M.G., H.M. Ambassador Extraordinary and Plenipotentiary at Moscow.
- William Mabane, Esq., M.P., Parliamentary Secretary, Ministry of Food since 1942. Assistant Postmaster General, June, 1939; Parliamentary Secretary, Ministry of Home Security, October, 1939. Member of Parliament for Huddersfield since 1931.
- Wilfred Paling, Esq., M.P., Parliamentary Secretary, Ministry of Pensions since 1941. A Lord Commissioner of H.M. Treasury, 1929–1931 and 1940–1941. Member of Parliament for Wentworth since 1933.
- Captain Charles Waterhouse, M.C., D.L., M.P., Parliamentary Secretary, Board of Trade since 1941. A Lord Commissioner of H.M. Treasury, 1937; Comptroller of H.M. Household, 1937–1939; Treasurer of H.M. Household, 1939–1941. Member of Parliament for South Leicester since 1924.

== Baronet ==
- Sir (Sydney) Richard Wells, D.L., M.P., Member of Parliament for Bedford since 1922. For political and public services.

== Knight Bachelor ==
- George Edwin Bailey, Esq., C.B.E., Works Director, Metropolitan-Vickers Electrical Company Ltd.
- Ernest Barker, Esq., Litt.D., D.Litt., LL.D., Emeritus Professor of Political Science, Cambridge University.
- Robert Barlow, Esq., Chairman of the Industrial Panel, Ministry of Production.
- Charles John Bartlett, Esq., Managing Director, Vauxhall Motors Limited.
- Eric Vansittart Bowater, Esq., Deputy Controller of Repair Equipment and Overseas Supplies, Ministry of Aircraft Production.
- Ernest Herbert Cooper, Esq., lately Industrial Adviser to the Ministry of Commerce and Production, Northern Ireland.
- Patrick Ashley Cooper, Esq., lately Director-General of Finance, Ministry of Supply.
- Marshall Millar Craig, Esq., C.B., K.C., Legal Secretary and Chief Parliamentary Draftsman, Lord Advocate's Department.
- Colonel Arthur Charles Davis, J.P., D.L., Alderman, lately Sheriff of the City of London.
- Geoffrey de Havilland, Esq., C.B.E., A.F.C., F.R.Ae.S., Director, de Havilland Aircraft Company, Ltd.
- Charles Lee des Forges, Esq., C.B.E., Town Clerk, Rotherham.
- Professor Jack Cecil Drummond, D.Sc., F.I.C., Scientific Adviser to the Ministry of Food.
- John Montague Eddy, Esq., C.B.E., Deputy Chairman, Prisoners of War Department, Joint War Organisation of the British Red Cross Society and Order of St John.
- Captain George Sampson Elliston, M.C., J.P., D.L., M.P., Member of Parliament for Blackburn since October, 1931. For political and public services.
- Professor Frank Leonard Engledow, C.M.G., M.A., Professor of Agriculture, Cambridge University.
- John Jacob Fox, Esq., C.B., O.B.E., D.Sc., F.R.S., Government Chemist.
- Professor Francis Richard Fraser, M.D., F.R.C.P., Director-General, Emergency Medical Service.
- Ronald Thornbury Garrett, Esq., Chairman, National Dock Labour Corporation Limited.
- Captain Henry Robert Gordon, D.S.C., Commodore Captain, Shaw Savill and Albion Company Ltd.
- William Thomson Halcrow, Esq., M.Inst.C.E., M.I.Mech.E., Engineering Consultant to the War Office.
- His Honour Judge Gerald de la Pryme Hargreaves, County Court Judge.
- Major Archibald Isidore Harris, Timber Controller, Ministry of Supply.
- Walter Haward, Esq., O.B.E., M.B., B.S., M.R.C.S., L.R.C.P., Director-General of Medical Services, Ministry of Pensions.
- Herbert Holdsworth, Esq., M.P., Member of Parliament for Bradford South since 1931. For political and public services.
- Thomas Hunter, Esq., J.P., M.P., Member of Parliament for Perth since November, 1935. For political and public services.
- Alderman Thomas Jones, M.R.C.S., L.R.C.P., J.P., Chairman of the Anglesey Education Committee.
- George Knight, Esq. For services in the cause of religion.
- Air Vice-Marshal Norman Duckworth Kerr MacEwen, C.B., C.M.G., D.S.O., R.A.F. (Retired), Chairman, Soldiers', Sailors' and Airmen's Families Association.
- Thomas Ralph Merton, Esq., D.Sc., F.R.S., Scientific Adviser, Ministry of Production.
- John Gibb Nicholson, Esq., Deputy Chairman, Imperial Chemical Industries Limited.
- Robert Nimmo, Esq., Lord Provost of Perth.
- Major Goronwy Owen, D.S.O., D.L., M.P., Member of Parliament for Caernarvon since December, 1923. For political and public services.
- William Paterson, Esq., M.I.Mech.E., Chairman of the Paterson Engineering Company Ltd.
- Robert Barclay Pearson, Esq., Chairman of the Stock Exchange.
- Adolph Harry Railing, Esq., D.Eng., M.I.E.E., Chairman and General Manager, General Electric Company Ltd.
- Harry Ralph Selley, Esq., J.P., M.P., Member of Parliament for South Battersea since 1931. For political and public services.
- Oliver Edwin Simmonds, Esq., F.R.Ae.S., M.P., lately Chairman of a Committee on the Brick Industry.
- Leon Simon, Esq., C.B., Director of Savings, General Post Office.
- Thomas Somerset, Esq., D.L., M.P. For public services in Northern Ireland.
- Frederick Charles Stewart, Esq., M.I.N.A., Chairman of Thermotank Ltd.
- Charles Sheriton Swan, Esq., Chairman, Swan Hunter and Wigham Richardson, Limited.
- Philip Allan Warter, Esq., Controller-General of Factory and Storage Premises, Board of Trade.
- Thomas George Wilson, Esq., Chairman, Scottish Milk Marketing Board.

Dominions:

- The Honourable John Cowan, Member of the Legislative Council of the State of South Australia for many years. For public services.
- Lewis Edward Emerson, Esq., a Member of the Commission of Government, Newfoundland, since 1937, Commissioner for Justice, Attorney-General and Commissioner for Defence, Newfoundland.

India:

- The Honourable Mr Justice James Harvey Monroe, Puisne Judge of the High Court of Judicature at Lahore, Punjab.
- The Honourable Mr Justice Navroji Jahangir Wadia, Indian Civil Service, Puisne Judge of the High Court of Judicature at Bombay.
- The Honourable Mr Justice Archibald John King, Indian Civil Service, Puisne Judge of the High Court of Judicature at Fort St George, Madras.
- The Honourable Mr Justice Harold James Collister, Indian Civil Service, Puisne Judge of the High Court of Judicature at Allahabad, United Provinces.
- Archie William Ibbotson, Esq., C.I.E., M.B.E., M.C., Indian Civil Service, Adviser to His Excellency the Governor of the United Provinces and lately Secretary to the Government of India in the Civil Defence Department.
- Charles MacIver Grant Ogilvie, Esq., C.S.I., C.B.E., Indian Civil Service, Secretary to the Government of India in the Defence Department.
- Denys Pilditch, Esq., C.I.E., Indian Police, Director, Intelligence Bureau, Home Department, Government of India.
- Kenneth John Nicolson, Esq., M.C., Chief Controller of Purchase (Munitions), Department of Supply, Government of India.
- Lionel Bell Gasson, Esq., Indian Police, Inspector-General of Police, Madras.
- Khan Bahadur Nawab Makhdum Murid Hussain Qureshi, Member of the Central Legislative Assembly, Honorary Extra Assistant Commissioner and Sub-Registrar, Multan, Punjab.
- Edward Matheson Souter, Esq., C.I.E., Controller of Supplies, United Provinces Circle, Cawnpore.
- Sayyid Mehdi Husain Bilgrami, Nawab Mahdi Yar Jang Bahadur, Judicial and Education Member, His Exalted Highness the Nizam's Executive Council, Hyderabad (Deccan).
- Chintaman Dwarkanath Deshmukh, Esq., C.I.E., Indian Civil Service, Governor, Reserve Bank of India.
- Usha Nath Sen, Esq., C.B.E., Director and Managing Editor, Associated Press of India, New Delhi.

Burma:

- Lieutenant-Colonel Alexander Campbell, M.C., Indian Educational Service, Director of Public Instruction, Burma.

Colonies, Protectorates, etc.:

- Robert Harry Drayton, Esq., C.M.G., Colonial Administrative Service, Chief Secretary, Ceylon.
- John Milner Gray, Esq., Colonial Legal Service, Chief Justice, Zanzibar.
- Colonel George Wykeham Heron, C.M.G., C.B.E., D.S.O., M.R.C.S., L.R.C.P., Colonial Medical Service, Director of Medical Services, Palestine.
- Charles Ramsdale Lockhart, Esq., C.B.E., Colonial Administrative Service, Chairman, East African Production and Supply Council.

== Order of the Companions of Honour (CH) ==
- The Right Honourable Richard Gardiner Casey, D.S.O., M.C., Minister of State Resident in the Middle East.
- The Reverend Edmund Horace Fellowes, M.V.O., M.A., Mus.Doc. For services to the history of English music.
- The Right Honourable Robert Spear Hudson, M.P., Minister of Agriculture and Fisheries.

== Order of the Bath ==
=== Knight Grand Cross of the Order of the Bath (GCB) ===
- Admiral Sir William Milbourne James, K.C.B., M.P. (Retired).
- General Sir George James Giffard, K.C.B., D.S.O., late The Queen's Royal Regiment (West Surrey), Aide-de-Camp General to The King.
- Sir Edward Ettingdene Bridges, K.C.B., M.C., Secretary of the War Cabinet.

=== Knight Commander of the Order of the Bath (KCB) ===
- Vice-Admiral Arthur John Power, C.B., C.V.O.
- Paymaster Rear-Admiral William Evelyn Hatten Jolly, C.B.
- Lieutenant-General Thomas Lionel Hunton, C.B., M.V.O., O.B.E., Royal Marines.
- Lieutenant-General Francis Poitier Nosworthy, C.B., D.S.O., M.C., Colonel Commandant, Royal Engineers.
- Lieutenant-General Edwin Logie Morris, C.B., O.B.E., M.C., late Royal Engineers.
- Colonel Edwin James King, C.B., C.M.G., T.D., D.L., Chairman, Territorial Army and Air Force Association of the County of Middlesex.
- Acting Air Marshal David Grahame Donald, C.B., D.F.C., A.F.C., Royal Air Force.
- Acting Air Marshal Roderic Maxwell Hill, C.B., M.C., A.F.C., Royal Air Force.
- Sir Reader William Bullard, K.C.M.G., C.I.E., His Majesty's Minister at Tehran.
- Sir Cornelius Joseph Gregg, K.B.E., C.B., LL.D., Chairman, Board of Inland Revenue.
- Frederick Percival Robinson, Esq., C.B., Secretary, Ministry of Works.
- Sir Harold Richard Scott, K.B.E., C.B., Permanent Secretary, Ministry of Aircraft Production. Lately Secretary, Ministry of Home Security.

=== Companion of the Order of the Bath (CB) ===
Military Division

- Vice-Admiral Thomas Bernard Drew, O.B.E. (Retired).
- Rear-Admiral Harold Thomas Coulthard Walker.
- Rear-Admiral Clement Moody.
- Rear-Admiral Rhoderick Robert McGrigor.
- Major-General Archibald Maxwell Craig, O.B.E., Royal Marines.
- Captain Charles Edward Larribe, C.V.O., Royal Navy.
- Major-General Edward Montagu Campbell Clarke, C.B.E., late Royal Artillery.
- Major-General Langley Browning, O.B.E., M.C., late Royal Artillery.
- Major-General Gwilym Ivor Thomas, D.S.O., M.C., late Royal Artillery.
- Major-General Alexander Gordon Biggam, O.B.E., M.D., F.R.C.P., late Royal Army Medical Corps, Honorary Physician to The King.
- Major-General Evelyn Hugh Barker, C.B.E., D.S.O., M.C., late The King's Royal Rifle Corps.
- Major-General Eric Bertram Rowcroft, C.B.E., M.I.Mech.E., M.I.E.E., late Royal Army Service Corps.
- Colonel (acting Lieutenant-General) Neil Methuen Ritchie, C.B.E., D.S.O., M.C., late The Black Watch (Royal Highland Regiment).
- Colonel (temporary Major-General) Douglas Henry Pratt, D.S.O., M.C., late Royal Tank Corps.
- Colonel (acting Major-General) Russell Gurney, late The Suffolk Regiment.
- Colonel (temporary Major-General) William John Eldridge, C.B.E., D.S.O., M.C., late Royal Artillery.
- Major-General (temporary Lieutenant-General) William Duthie Morgan, D.S.O., M.C., late Royal Artillery.
- Colonel (temporary Major-General) John Drummond Inglis, O.B.E., M.C., late Royal Engineers.
- Colonel (temporary Brigadier) (acting Major-General) Frank Ernest Wallace Simpson, D.S.O., late Royal Engineers.
- Colonel (temporary Major-General) Robert Clive, Viscount Bridgeman, D.S.O., M.C., late The Rifle Brigade (Prince Consort's Own).
- Colonel (temporary Major-General) Erroll Arthur Edwin Tremlett, late Royal Artillery, Territorial Army.
- Lieutenant-Colonel (temporary Colonel) (acting Major-General) Charles Max Page, D.S.O., M.B., F:R.C.S., Royal Army Medical Corps.
- Lieutenant-Colonel (temporary Brigadier) (local Major-General) Herbert Covington Cole, C.B.E., F.S.I., General List.
- Major-General Rob McGregor Macdonald Lockhart, C.I.E., M.C., Indian Army.
- Colonel (temporary Major-General) James Bruce Scott, D.S.O., M.C., Indian Army.
- Colonel (temporary Major-General) Reginald Arthur Savory, D.S.O., M.C., Indian Army.
- Colonel (acting Lieutenant-General) William Joseph Slim, C.B.E., D.S.O., M.C., Indian Army.
- Air Vice-Marshal William Boston Cushion=, C.B.E., Royal Air Force.
- Acting Air Vice-Marshal John Denis Breakey, D.F.C., Royal Air Force.
- Acting Air Vice-Marshal George Eric Brookes, O.B.E., A.D.C., Royal Canadian Air Force.
- Acting Air Vice-Marshal Aubrey Beauclerk Ellwood, D.S.C., Royal Air Force.
- Acting Air Vice-Marshal Robert Owen Jones, A.F.C., Royal Air Force.
- Acting Air Vice-Marshal Edward Arthur Beckton Rice, C.B.E., M.C., Royal Air Force.
- Acting Air Vice-Marshal Charles Ronald Steele, D.F.C., Royal Air Force.
- Acting Air Vice-Marshal Thomas Melling Williams, O.B.E., M.C., D.F.C., Royal Air Eorce.
- Air Commodore William Elliot, C.B.E., D.F.C., Royal Air Force.
- Air Commodore Alick Charles Stevens, Royal Air Force.
- Air Commodore James Ambrose Stone, Royal Air Force.
- Acting Air Commodore Charles Putnam Symonds, M.D., F.R.C.P., Royal Air Force Volunteer Reserve.

Australia:

- Colonel (temporary Major-General) Francis Plumley Derham, D.S.O., V.D., Australian Military Forces.

New Zealand:

- Major-General Peter Harvey Bell, D.S.O., New Zealand Military Forces.

Civil Division

- Charles Swift Lillicrap, Esq., M.B.E.
- Colonel Frederick Gustavus Danielsen, D.S.O., T.D., D.L., Chairman, Territorial Army and Air Force Association of the County of Warwick.
- Lieutenant-Colonel (Brevet Colonel) William Henry Wiggin, D.S.O., T.D., D.L., Chairman, Territorial Army Association of the County of Worcester.
- Clement Guy Caines, Esq., O.B.E., Assistant Under-Secretary of State, Air Ministry.
- Charles Travis Clay, Esq., Librarian, House of Lords.
- Oliver Charles Harvey, Esq., C.M.G., Assistant Under-Secretary of State, Foreign Office; until recently Principal Private Secretary to the Secretary of State.
- Percy Norman Harvey, Esq., Director of Statistics and Intelligence, Ministry of War Transport. Deputy Government Actuary.
- Charles Nathan, Esq., Principal Assistant Secretary, Ministry of Agriculture and Fisheries.
- Courtenay Denis Carew Robinson, Esq., Assistant Under-Secretary of State, Home Office.
- George David Roseway, Esq., C.B.E., Director of Finance, War Office.
- George Lawrence Watkinson, Esq., M.C., Under Secretary, Board of Trade.
- Robert William Wharhirst, Esq., C.B.E., Director of the Armament Supply Department, Admiralty.
- Harold Herbert Wiles, Esq., M.B.E., Under-Secretary, Ministry of Labour and National Service.

== Order of the Star of India ==
=== Companion of the Order of the Star of India (CSI) ===
- Lieutenant-Colonel Denholm de Montalte Stuart Fraser, C.I.E., Indian Political Service, Resident in Mysore.
- Christopher Hughes Masterman, Esq., C.I.E., Indian Civil Service, Member, Board of Revenue, Land Revenue and Irrigation, Madras.
- Frederick Chalmers Bourne, Esq., C.I.E., Indian Civil Service, Chief Secretary to the Government of the Punjab.

== Order of St Michael and St George ==
=== Knight Grand Cross of the Order of St Michael and St George (GCMG) ===
- Sir George Henry Gater, K.C.B., C.M.G., D.S.O., Permanent Under-Secretary of State, Colonial Office.

=== Knight Commander of the Order of St Michael and St George (KCMG) ===
- Hilary Rudolph Robert Blood, Esq., C.M.G., Governor and Commander-in-Chief of the Colony of the Gambia.
- Sir Edmund Charles Richards, C.M.G., Governor and Commander-in-Chief of the Nyasaland Protectorate.
- Paul Dalrymple Butler, Esq., C.M.G., one of His Majesty's Consuls-General.
- Victor Alexander Louis Mallet, Esq., C.M.G., C.V.O., His Majesty's Envoy Extraordinary and Minister Plenipotentiary at Stockholm.
- Sir Frederick William Maze, K.B.E., until recently Inspector-General of Chinese Maritime Customs.

=== Companion of the Order of St Michael and St George (CMG) ===
- Major-General Colin McVean Gubbins, D.S.O., M.C., General Staff, War Office.
- Roscoe Herbert, Esq., Chief British Economic Adviser in French North Africa, Ministry of Supply.
- Paymaster-Commander Robert Gillman Allen Jackson, O.B.E., R.A.N., Principal Assistant Secretary, Department of the Minister of State, Cairo.
- Adam Denzil Marris, Esq., Head of the Commodities Section of Ministry of Economic Warfare Staff at His Majesty's Embassy, Washington.
- Professor Dennis Holme Robertson, F.B.A., Economic Adviser, H.M. Treasury.
- Folliott Herbert Sandford, Esq., Head of the Secretariat in the Office of the Minister Resident in West Africa.
- Alec Williamson, Esq., Indian Civil Service, Burma.
- Hugh Thomas Moffitt Angwin, Esq., M.Inst.C.E., Engineer-in-Chief, State of South Australia.
- Norman Ernest Archer, Esq., O.B.E., Assistant Secretary, Dominions Office.
- Eric Kellett Featherstone, Esq., Colonial Administrative Service, Resident Commissioner of Swaziland.
- Herbert Kingsley Paine, Esq., Local Court Judge and Judge in Insolvency, State of South Australia.
- Arthur Leopold Armstrong, Esq., O.B.E., Colonial Administrative Service, formerly Agent and Consul, Tonga, now Commissioner for Reconstruction, Fiji.
- David Callender Campbell, Esq., Colonial Administrative Service, Lieutenant-Governor, Malta.
- Frederick Bernard Carr, Esq., Colonial Administrative Service, Senior Resident, Nigeria.
- Reginald Stuart Champion, Esq., O.B.E., Colonial Administrative Service, Chief Secretary, Aden.
- Bertie Harry Michael Easter, Esq., C.B.E., Colonial Education Service, Director of Education, Jamaica.
- George Howard Gibbs, Esq., M.C., Colonial Administrative Service, Chief Commissioner, Northern Territories, Gold Coast.
- Charles Arthur Hooper, Esq., Colonial Legal Service, Procureur and Advocate-General, Mauritius.
- Ethelbert Bernard Hosking, Esq., O.B.E., Colonial Administrative Service, Chief Native Commissioner, Kenya.
- William Lindsay Murphy, Esq., Colonial Administrative Service, Colonial Secretary, Bermuda.
- Jesse John Paskin, Esq., M.C., Assistant Secretary, Colonial Office.
- Robert Christopher Stafford Stanley, Esq., O.B.E., Colonial Administrative Service, Colonial Secretary, Barbados.
- Cyril Leonard Wickremesinghe, Esq., Colonial Administrative Service, Officer, Class I, Ceylon Civil Service.
- Francis Edward Evans, Esq., His Majesty's Consul at New York.
- Laurence Barton Grafftey-Smith, Esq., O.B.E., His Majesty's Consul-General at Antananarivo.
- Henry Lennox d'Aubigne Hopkinson, Esq., Minister at His Majesty's Embassy at Lisbon.
- William Angus Boyd Iliff, Esq., Financial Counsellor at His Majesty's Legation at Tehran.
- John Garnett Lomax, Esq., M.B.E., M.C., Commercial Counsellor at His Majesty's Embassy at Angora.
- Roger Mellor Makins, Esq., attached to the staff of the British Representative to the French Committee of National Liberation, Algiers.
- Captain Hilary Dorsett Owen, R.N., Naval Attaché at His Majesty's Embassy at Lisbon.
- John Victor Thomas Woolrych Tait Perowne, Esq., Head of the South American Department of the Foreign Office.
- Laurence Milner Robinson, Esq., His Majesty's Consul-General at Philadelphia.
- Paymaster-Commander Percy Stanley Sykes, O.B.E., R.D., R.N.R., attached to a Department of the Foreign Office.

== Order of the Indian Empire ==
=== Knight Grand Commander of the Order of the Indian Empire (GCIE) ===
- Sir Reginald Maitland Maxwell, K.C.S.I., C.I.E., Indian Civil Service, Member of the Governor-General's Executive Council.
- General Sir Alan Fleming Hartley, K.C.S.I., C.B., D.S.O., A.D.C., lately Deputy Commander-in-Chief in India.

=== Knight Commander of the Order of the Indian Empire (KCIE) ===
- David Norman Strathie, Esq., C.I.E., Indian Civil Service, Adviser to His Excellency the Governor of Madras.
- Sir Alexander Cameron Badenoch, C.S.I., C.I.E., Indian Civil Service, Auditor-General of India.
- Olaf Kirkpatrick Caroe, Esq., C.S.I., C.I.E., Indian Political Service, Secretary to the Government of India in the External Affairs Department.
- Evan Meredith Jenkins, Esq., C.S.I., C.I.E., Indian Civil Service, Secretary to the Governor-General (Personal), and Private Secretary to His Excellency the Viceroy, and lately Secretary to the Government of India in the Department of Supply.

=== Companion of the Order of the Indian Empire (CIE) ===
- Swaminatha Adutthurai Venkataraman, Esq., Indian Civil Service, Joint Secretary to the Government of India in the Department of Supply.
- Saiyid Rashid-uz-Zamari, Indian Civil Service, Joint Secretary to the Government of India in the Department of Commerce.
- Binay Ranjan Sen, Esq., Indian Civil Service, Direetor-General of Food, Government of India, and lately Secretary to the Government of Bengal, Revenue Department.
- Colonel (Acting Major-General) Frederick Whitmore Burch, M.C., Indian Army, Director of Staff Duties, General Headquarters, India.
- Graham Linsell Vivian, Esq., Indian Civil Service, Officiating Chief Secretary to the Government of the United Provinces, and lately Commissioner, Allahabad Division, United Provinces.
- Alfred Sloane Larkin, Esq., Indian Civil Service, Commissioner, Dacca Division, Bengal.
- Donald Stewart, Esq., O.B.E., Indian Forest Service, Deputy Director-General, Directorate-General of Supply, New Delhi.
- Herbert John Todd, Esq., Indian Political Service, Resident for the Madras States.
- Philip George Braye, Esq., Indian Civil Service, Officiating Commissioner, Berar Division, Central Provinces and Berar.
- Jasper Fellowes Crofts Reynolds, Esq., M.C., Agent and General Manager, South Indian Railway, Trichinopoly.
- Hubert George Salmond, Esq., A.M.I.C.E., A.C.G.I., Chief Government Inspector of Railways.
- Norman Percival Arthur Smith, Esq., O.B.E., Indian Police, Inspector-General of Police, Bombay.
- Commodore John Talbot Savignac Hall, Royal Indian Navy, Chief Staff Officer, Naval Headquarters, India.
- Colonel (Temporary Brigadier) Arthur Henry Williams, M.C., Indian Army, Commandant, Infantry Schools, Saugor.
- Lieutenant-Colonel (Temporary Brigadier) James Ingram Muirhead, M.C., Indian Army, Commander, Delhi Area.
- Colonel (Temporary Brigadier) Andrew Hugh Mackie, Indian Army, Director of Remounts, General Headquarters, India.
- Colonel (Temporary Brigadier) Edgar William Rogers, Indian Army, Director of Armaments, General Headquarters, India.
- Walter Watson Dalziel, Esq., Indian Civil Service, Secretary to the Government of Orissa in the Law, Commerce and Labour Departments.
- Kunwar Hajee Ismaiel Alikhan, O.B.E., Member of the Central Legislative Assembly, Rais of Asrauli Estate, Bulandshahr District, United Provinces.
- William George Dench, Esq., Indian Service of Engineers, Chief Engineer and Secretary to the Government, Public Works Department, Irrigation Branch, Punjab.
- Astad Dinshaw Gorwala, Esq., Indian Civil Service, Secretary to the Government of Bombay, Finance Department, and Director of Civil Supplies and Supply Commissioner, Bombay.
- Colonel Reginald Henry Phillimore, D.S.O. (late R.E.), Superintendent, Survey of India.
- Murtough Carbery, Esq., D.S.O., M.C., Indian Agricultural Service, Director of Agriculture, Bengal.
- Sri Pattipati Hanimireddigari Rama Reddi, Indian Agricultural Service, Director of Agriculture, Madras.
- Kenneth Eustace Lee Pennell, Esq., M.C., Indian Service of Engineers, Chief Engineer (North), Assam.
- Colonel Thomas Crawford Boyd, Indian Medical Service, Inspector-General of Civil Hospitals, United Provinces.
- Popatial Govindalal Shah, Esq., Indian Audit and Accounts Service, Accountant-General, Bombay.
- Rai Bahadur Shyamnandan Sahay, Member of the Bihar Legislative Council, Zamindar, Baghi, Muzaffarpur, Bihar.
- Alexander MacLeod Robertson, Esq., M.C., Chief Mechanical Engineer, Bengal Nagpur Railway.
- Lieutenant-Colonel Augustine Sargood Fry, Indian Medical Service, Professor of Operative Surgery, King Edward Medical College, Lahore, Punjab.
- David Arnold Howell, Esq., O.B.E., Chief Engineer, Civil Defence and Public Health Department, Punjab.
- Donald Bevan Sothers, Esq., Indian Forest Service, Chief Conservator of Forests, Bombay.
- Robert William Fitzmaurice Butterfield, Esq., J.P., Financial Adviser and Chief Accounts Officer, Bombay, Baroda and Central India Railway, Bombay.
- Lieutenant-Colonel Wilfred Francis Webb, Indian Political Service, Dewah, Cutch State.
- Hugh Trevor Lambrick, Esq., Indian Civil Service, lately Civil Adviser to the Chief Administrator of the Martial Law in Sind.
- Major Tom Hickinbotham, O.B.E., Indian Political Service, Political Agent, Kuwait, Persian Gulf.
- Herbert Eric St George McClenaghan, Esq., Indian Civil Service, Collector of Central Excises and Salt Revenue, Bombay.
- James Beckett, Esq., Indian Police, Deputy Inspector-General of Police, Madras.
- Lieutenant-Colonel Arthur Denham White, F.R.C.S., Indian Medical Service (retired), Bengal.
- Thomas Lawrence Hart Smith-Pearse, Esq., Indian Educational Service, Principal, Rajkumar College, Raipur.
- Syed Ahmed-el-Edroos Bahadur, O.B.I., Major-General and Commander, His Exalted Highness the Nizam's Regular Forces.

== Royal Victorian Order ==
=== Knight Grand Cross of the Royal Victorian Order (GCVO) ===
- The Honourable Sir Arthur Stanley, G.B.E., C.B., M.V.O., LL.D.

=== Knight Commander of the Royal Victorian Order (KCVO) ===
- Brigadier-General Sir Harold Hartley, C.B.E., F.R.S., M.C., M.A.
- Sir Ernest Henry Pooley, M.A.

=== Commander of the Royal Victorian Order (CVO) ===
- Colonel Edward William Sturgis Balfour, D.S.O., O.B.E., M.C., Scots Guards (dated 30 November 1943).
- Lieutenant-Colonel Frederick Robert Stephen Balfour, F.L.S., J.P., D.L.
- Lieutenant-Colonel John Bowden, O.B.E.
- Lieutenant-Colonel Sir Edward Boscawen Frederick, Bt.
- Reginald Morier Yorke Gleadowe, Esq. (dated 4 October 1943).
- George Ravensworth Hughes, Esq. (dated 4 October 1943).
- Francis Hugo Teale, Esq., M.D., F.R.C.P.

=== Member of the Royal Victorian Order (MVO) ===
- Leslie Gordon James Durbin, Esq. (dated 4 October 1943).
- Gilbert Sidney Herlihy, Esq., M.V.O.
- Harry Ireland, Esq. (dated 30 July 1943).
- Miss Winifred Logan.
- Arthur Cecil Mann, Esq.

== Order of the British Empire ==
=== Knight Grand Cross of the Order of the British Empire (GBE) ===
- Admiral Sir Percy Lockhart Noble, K.C.B., C.V.O.
- Sir (George) Allan Powell, C.B.E., Chairman of the British Broadcasting Corporation.
- The Right Honourable Sir (James) Arthur Salter, K.C.B., M.P., lately Joint Parliamentary Secretary, Ministry of War Transport.
- Sir Cowasjee Jehangir, Bt., K.C.I.E., O.B.E., Member of the Central Legislative Assembly, and Member, National Defence Council.

=== Dame Commander of the Order of the British Empire (DBE) ===
- Air Chief Commandant Katherine Jane Trefusis Forbes, C.B.E., Women's Auxiliary Air Force.

=== Knight Commander of the Order of the British Empire (KBE) ===
- Vice-Admiral St Aubyn Baldwin Wake, C.B. (Retired).
- Vice-Admiral Richard Hayden Owen Lane-Poole, C.B., O.B.E. (Retired).
- Rear-Admiral (Commodore 2nd Class, R.N.R.) Cecil Nugent Reyne (Retired).
- Rear-Admiral (Commodore 2nd Class, R.N.R.) Oswald Henry Dawson (Retired).
- Major-General Henry Guy Riley, C.B., Colonel Commandant, Royal Army Pay Corps.
- Major-General James Syme Drew, C.B., D.S.O., M.C., Colonel, The Queen's Own Cameron Highlanders.
- Colonel (temporary Major-General) Robert Ferguson Lock, C.B., late Royal Artillery.
- Air Vice-Marshal Robert Henry Magnus Spencer Saundby, C.B., M.C., D.F.C., A.F.C., Royal Air Force.
- William Robert Fraser, Esq., C.B., Secretary, War Damage Commission.
- Cyril John Radcliffe, Esq., K.C., Director-General, Ministry of Information.
- George Wilfred Turner, Esq., C.B., Joint Second Secretary, Ministry of Supply.
- John Crompton Wrigley, Esq., C.B., Joint Deputy Secretary, Ministry of Health.
- Douglas Newbold, Esq., C.B.E., Civil Secretary, Sudan Government.
- Colonel Edward Townley Peel, D.S.O., M.C., a British subject resident in Egypt.
- Colonel the Honourable Ernest Lucas Guest, O.B.E., Minister of Mines, Public Works and Air, Southern Rhodesia. For public services, especially in connection with the inauguration of the Empire Air Training Scheme in the Colony.
- Oliver Ernest Goonetilleke, Esq., C.M.G., Civil Defence Commissioner, Ceylon.

=== Commander of the Most Excellent Order of the British Empire (CBE) ===
- Engineer Rear Admiral Thomas Elliott Aitkenhead, Royal Navy (Retired).
- Major General Norman Kempe Jolley, O.B.E., Royal Marines.
- Captain (Commodore First Class) Michael Maynard Denny, C.B., Royal Navy.
- Captain (Commodore Second Class) Benjamin Charles Stanley Martin, D.S.O., Royal Navy.
- Captain Ronald William Blacklock, D.S.C., Royal Navy (Retired).
- Captain Angus Edward Malise Bontine Cunninghame-Graham, Royal Navy (Dumbarton).
- Captain John Schomberg Hammill, Royal Navy (Retired).
- Captain John Montagu Howson, Royal Navy (Wickham).
- Captain Roy Neville Suter, D.S.O., Royal Navy (Retired).
- Acting Captain Robert Gordon Hood Linzee, O.B.E., Royal Navy (Retired).
- Acting Captain Gilbert Howland Roberts, Royal Navy.
- Engineer Captain George Douglas Campbell, D.S.O., Royal Navy (Retired) (Birdham, Sussex).
- Captain (E) Cyril Arthur Shaw, Royal Navy.
- Surgeon Captain Henry Brice Parker, D.S.C., M.B., B.S., M.R.C.S., L.R.C.P., Royal Navy (Retired).
- Paymaster Captain Archibald Frederick Cooper, O.B.E., Royal Navy (Retired).
- Paymaster Captain Percy D'Evelyn Marks, C.M.G., Royal Navy (Retired).
- Paymaster Captain Lewis Anselm Ritchie, C.V.O., Royal Nåvy.
- Instructor Captain Algernon Frederick Akhurst, M.A., Royal Navy.
- Mrs Euphemia Violet Welby, Superintendent, W.R.N.S.
- Colonel (temporary brigadier) Charles Scott Napier, Royal Engineers.
- Colonel (temporary Brigadier) Basil Cedric Ashton, M.B., Ch.B., Edin., Indian Medical Service, Honorary Surgeon to The King.
- Lieutenant-Colonel (temporary Colonel) (acting Brigadier) James Francis Benoy, The South Staffordshire Regiment.
- Colonel (temporary Brigadier) Edward Norton Clifton, late Royal Engineers.
- Lieutenant-Colonel (temporary Colonel) (temporary Brigadier) Brian Bingay Edwards, O.B.E., M.C., Royal Engineers.
- Lieutenant-Colonel (temporary Brigadier) Edward Sebastian Burke Gaffney, Royal Artillery.
- Lieutenant-Colonel (temporary Colonel) Frederick Harris, M.C., M.B., Royal Army Medical Corps.
- Colonel Patrick Vyvian Harris, late 17th/21st Lancers.
- Colonel Howard George Fitzgerald Hay, Devon Home Guard.
- Lieutenant-Colonel (temporary Colonel) Harry Cecil Honeybourne, M.A., Army Educational Corps.
- Colonel (honorary Brigadier) Archibald Cecil Hughes, T.D., late The Royal Berkshire Regiment (Princess Charlotte of Wales's), Territorial Army.
- Lieutenant-Colonel (temporary Colonel) (temporary Brigadier) Basil Perronet Hughes, Royal Artillery.
- Colonel (temporary Brigadier) Christian West Bayne-Jardine, D.S.O., M.C., late Royal Artillery.
- Lieutenant-Colonel (temporary Colonel) Alexander Herbert Killick, D.S.O., M.C., The East Yorkshire Regiment (The Duke of York's Own).
- Lieutenant-Colonel (temporary Brigadier) John Mather Kirkman, Royal Artillery.
- Colonel Edward Prince Lloyd, D.S.O., late The Royal Northumberland Fusiliers.
- Colonel (temporary Brigadier) Charles Falkland Loewen, late Royal Artillery.
- Colonel John Plunkett Magrane, E.D., Fiji Military Forces.
- Lieutenant-Colonel (temporary Brigadier) Morgan Cyril Morgan, M.C., The South Wales Borderers.
- Colonel (temporary Brigadier) Charles Scott Napier, O.B.E., late Royal Engineers.
- Lieutenant-Colonel (temporary Brigadier) John Lenox Clavering Napier, Royal Tank Regiment, Royal Armoured Corps.
- Colonel (temporary Brigadier) Alfred Geoffrey Neville, M.C., late Royal Artillery.
- Colonel Joseph Clive Piggott, M.C., Warwickshire Home Guard.
- Colonel George James Paul St. Clair, D.S.O., late Royal Artillery.
- Colonel Cecil Llewellyn Samuelson, O.B.E., Buckinghamshire Home Guard.
- Colonel (temporary Brigadier) Gilbert John Victor Shepherd, D.S.O., late Royal Engineers.
- Colonel Harold Charles Smith, London Home Guard.
- Lieutenant-Colonel (temporary Brigadier) William Revell Revell-Smith, D.S.O., M.C., A.M., Royal Artillery.
- Colonel (temporary Brigadier) William Arthur Macdonald Stawell, M.C., late Royal Engineers.
- Lieutenant-Colonel (temporary Brigadier) Cecil Stanway Sugden, O.B.E., Royal Engineers.
- Colonel (temporary Major-General) Ralph Ernest Vyvyan, M.B.E., M.C., late Royal Corps of Signals.
- Chief Commander (temporary Controller) Margaret Frances Wagstaff, Auxiliary Territorial Service.
- Colonel (temporary Brigadier) Aubrey Ellis Williams, D.S.O., M.C., late The South Wales Borderers.
- Colonel (temporary Major-General) Edward Ambrose Woods, M.C., late Royal Artillery.
- Acting Air Vice Marshal Robert Allingham George, M.C., Royal Air Force.
- Air Commodore John Reginald Cassidy, Royal Air Force.
- Air Commodore John Patrick Coleman, A.F.C., Royal Air Force.
- Air Commodore Sydney Ernest Storrar, Royal Air Force.
- Air Commodore William Edward Theak, Royal Air Force.
- Acting Air Commodore Geoffrey Hill Ambler, O.B.E., A.F.C., A.D.C., Auxiliary Air Force.
- Acting Air Commodore William Arthur Darville Brook, Royal Air Force.
- Acting Air Commodore Richard Gregory Gardner, D.S.C., Royal Air Force.
- Acting Air Commodore Allan Hesketh, O.B.E., D.F.C., Royal Air Force.
- Acting Air Commodore Andrew Mckee, D.S.O., D.F.C., A.F.C., Royal Air Force.
- Acting Air Commodore Alan Patrick Ritchie, A.F.C., Royal Air Force.
- Acting Air Commodore Harold Vivian Satterly, D.F.C., Royal Air Force.
- Group Captain Robert Arthur Alexander Cole, O.B.E., Royal Air Force.
- Group Captain Alban Spenser Ellerton, O.B.E., Royal Air Force.
- Group Captain Neville Ross Fuller, Royal Air Force.
- Group Captain Alan David Gillmore, Royal Air Force.
- Group Captain Stephen Haistwell Hardy, Royal Air Force.
- Group Captain John Phelp Hitchings, Auxiliary Air Force.
- Group Captain Hugh Nelson, M.B.E., Royal Air Force.
- Group Captain Leonard Thomas Pankhurst, Royal Air Force.
- Group Captain Herbert Macdonald Pearson, Royal Air Force.
- Group Captain Paul Douglas Robertson, A.M., Royal Air Force.
- Group Captain Alfred Douglas Rogers, A.F.C., Royal Air Force.
- Group Captain Douglas William Robert Ryley, Royal Air Force.
- Group Captain Frank Whittle, Royal Air Force.
- Acting Group Captain John Greville Argles, Royal Air Force Volunteer Reserve.
- Acting Group Captain Lancelot Miller Corbet, M.B., B.S., Reserve of Air Force Officers.
- Acting Group Captain Clarence Rupert Dunlap, A.F.C., Royal Canadian Air Force.
- Acting Group Captain Donald Randell Evans, D.F.C., Royal Air Force.
- Acting Group Captain Charles George Lott, D.S.O., D.F.C., Royal Air Force.
- Acting Group Captain Sidney Lugg, Royal Air Force.
- Acting Group Captain Walter Caradine Wilson, D.S.O., O.B.E., M.C., Royal Air Force Volunteer Reserve.
- Colonel William Henry Hingeston, South African Air Force.

Australia:

- Captain (Commodore Second Class) George Dunbar Moore, Royal Australian Navy.
- Colonel (temporary Brigadier) Austin Claude Selwyn Holland, V.D., Australian Military Forces.

Civil Division

- Wallace Alan Akers, Esq., a Director of Research, Department of Scientific and Industrial Research.
- Charles Christopher Arnell, Esq., Adviser to the Ministry of War Transport in matters relating to the purchase of ships.
- George Ernest Ashforth, Esq., County Surveyor, Cheshire.
- Colonel Sydney Williams Louis Ashwanden, D.S.O., T.D., D.L., National Chairman of the British Legion, 1939–43:
- William Henry Baines, Esq., Town Clerk and Air Raid Precautions Controller, Liverpool.
- Anthony Bevir, Esq., Private Secretary to the Prime Minister.
- Walter Frederick Bishop, Esq., Director, W. T. Henley's Telegraph Works Company, Ltd.
- Major Robert Frederick Brebner, Chairman of Directors, the Highland and Agricultural Society.
- Lieutenant-Colonel Ernest Briggs, D.S.O., M.Inst.C.E., President, Soap and Candle Trades Employers' Federation.
- Frank Walter Brundle, Esq., Chairman, Civil Defence Emergency Committee, City of London.
- William Leslie Burgess, Esq., M.D., Ch.B., F.R.C.P.(Ed.), D.T.M., D.P.H., Medical Officer of Health, Dundee.
- William Tom Butterwick, Esq., M.I.N.A., Deputy Director of Merchant Shipbuilding, Admiralty.
- Edward Hazlehurst Cherry, Esq., M.B.E., Deputy General Manager, Navy, Army and Air Force Institutes.
- Captain Ewart Martin Coates, Master, Merchant Navy.
- George Lissant Cox, Esq., M.D., Chief Tuberculosis Officer, Lancashire County Council.
- George Charles Cunningham, Esq., Registrar of Death Duties, Scotland, Board of Inland Revenue.
- Arthur Edis Dean, Esq., M.A., M.Litt., Warden of Goldsmiths' College.
- Alan Nigel Drury, Esq., M.D., F.R.S., lately Member of the Scientific Staff, Medical Research Council.
- John Mawdsley Furniss, Esq., J.P., Honorary Treasurer, Liverpool Savings Committee.
- Clement William Osmund Gibson, Esq., Chief Inspector of Audits, Ministry of Health
- William Henry Glanville, Esq., D.Sc., Ph.D., M.Inst.C.E., a Director of Research, Department of Scientific and Industrial Research.
- Edwin George Gooch, Esq., President, National Union of Agricultural Workers.
- Walter William Hackett, Esq., J.P., Managing Director, Accles and Pollock Limited.
- Ernest Harry Hart, Esq., Assistant Secretary. Board of Customs and Excise.
- John Williams Hasselkus, Esq., Chairman and Managing Director, Ross Limited.
- Max Landauer, Esq., Hemp Controller, Ministry of Supply.
- Edward John Hayward, Esq., O.B.E., Clerk to the Justices, Cardiff, and President of the Incorporated Justices' Clerks' Society.
- Miss Cicely Howland, M.V.O., O.B.E., Clerk in the Office of the Private Secretary to His Majesty the King.
- Harold Slaney Kershaw, Esq., Chairman of the North-West Regional Price Regulation Committee, Board of Trade.
- Paul Kimberley, Esq., O.B.E., A.R.P.S., Director of Army Cinematography, War Office.
- Ronald George Leach, Esq., Deputy Financial Secretary, Ministry of Food.
- Captain Guy Maynard Liddell, M.C., Civil Assistant, War Office.
- Hugh Scott Lindsay, Esq., Associated with the Parliamentary Labour Party since 1906; Secretary since 1919. For political services.
- William Ewart Clarke McIlroy, Esq., J.P., Mayor of Reading. For services to Civil Defence.
- Professor John Duncan Mackie, M.C., Professor of Scottish History, and Chairman of the Joint Recruiting Board, Glasgow University.
- Percy Harold Maggs, Esq., O.B.E., lately Assistant Secretary, Air Ministry.
- Henry William Meikle, Esq., D.Litt., H.M. Historiographer in Scotland and Librarian of the National Library in Scotland.
- Arthur Cecil Lockwood Morrison, Esq., Senior Chief Clerk of the Metropolitan Police Courts.
- William Nairn, Esq., President, Royal College of Veterinary Surgeons.
- Major Geoffrey Nicholson, M.C., Chief Constable of Surrey.
- Burrell Page, Esq., Director of Special Supplies, Admiralty.
- Leonard Cecil Paton, Esq., M.C., Joint Managing Director, United Kingdom Commercial Corporation, Limited.
- Norbert Edward Rowe, Esq., F.R.Ae.S., Director of Technical Development, Ministry of Aircraft Production.
- Colonel Harold Bantock Sankey, M.C., T.D., Regional Controller, Midlands Region, Ministry of Production.
- Professor Sydney Alfred Smith, M.D., F.R.C.P.(Ed.), Chairman of the Scottish Central Medical War Committee. For services to Civil Defence.
- John Henry George Stewart, Esq., M.B.E., Assistant Secretary, General Post Office.
- William Sutcliffe, Esq., Chief Engineer Officer, Merchant Navy.
- Samuel Tagg, Esq., J.P., Member of the Public Utility Undertakings Coal Committee.
- Claude Edward Tangye, Esq., M.D., M.R.C.S., L.R.C.P., D.P.H., County Medical Officer of Health, Wiltshire. For, services to Civil Defence.
- Colonel John Hessell Tiltman, O.B.E., M.C., employed in a Department of the Foreign Office,
- William Wallace, Esq., Managing Director, Brown Brothers Limited. President of the Engineering and Allied Employers' East of Scotland Association.
- Reginald Everard Lindsay Wellington, Esq., North American Director, British Broadcasting Corporation.
- Herbert Cecil Whitehead, Esq., M.Inst.C.E., Chief Engineer, Birmingham, Tame and Rea District Drainage Board.
- Alan Campbell Wilson, Esq., Assistant Solicitor, Department of H.M. Procurator General and Treasury Solicitor.
- Captain Robert Jeffery Wilson, Master, Merchant Navy.
- Herbert Martin Woodhams, Esq., Director and General Manager, Sir W. G. Armstrong Whitworth Aircraft Limited.
- Lieutenant-Colonel Charles Cuthbert Aston, O.B.E., Political Officer, Central and Southern Area, Iraq..
- Arthur Herbert Birse, Esq., M.B.E., employed in His Majesty's Embassy at Moscow.
- Alfred John Gardener, Esq., His Majesty's Consul at Shiraz.
- Samuel McAlister, Esq., a British subject resident in Brazil.
- Martin Willoughby Parr, Esq., O.B.E., Governor of Equatoria Province, Sudan.
- John Welsh, Esq., a British subject resident in the Argentine Republic.
- Frederick Young, Esq., C.I.E., Indian Police, lately Commissioner of Police, Martial Law Area, Sind.
- Anthony Jeseph Elkins, Esq., Controller of Supplies, Bengal Circle, Department of Supply, Government of India.
- George McIntosh, Esq., Chairman, Dooars Planters' Association, Bengal.
- James Richmond Northridge Pryde, Esq., General Manager, The Poonmudi Tea and Rubber Company, Limited, Kullakamby, The Nilgiris, Madras.
- Maharaj Shri Virbhadra Singh, Musahib Ala, Dungarpur State, Rajputana.
- Colonel Maurice Lawrence Treston, F.R.C.S., L.R.C.P., F.R.C.O.G., Indian Medical Service, Inspector-General of Civil Hospitals, Burma.
- George Harry Adams, Esq., A.S.A.A., Colonial Administrative Service, Financial Secretary, Nyasaland.
- Albert Allan, Esq., General Manager, Sierra Leone Railway.
- The Most Reverend Arthur Henry Anstey, D.D., Archbishop of the British West Indies.
- Maurice Joseph Flanagan, Esq., Price Controller, Palestine.
- Hubert Kennett Purcell, Esq., O.B.E., Chief Clerk, Crown Agents for the Colonies.
- Frederick Jacob Seaford, Esq., O.B.E. For public services in British Guiana.
- The Right Reverend Bishop Leo Hale Taylor, Vicar Apostolic of the Bight of Benin, Nigeria. For services to education.
- George Frederick Wilson, Esq., O.B.E., Treasurer, Cyprus.

Honorary:

- Yahaya, Emir of Gwandu, Nigeria.

=== Officer of the Most Excellent Order of the British Empire (OBE) ===
- Commander John Hext Lewes, Royal Navy.
- Commander John Shirley Sandys Litchfield Speer, Royal Navy (Overton, Basingstoke).
- Commander Ralph Adam Nicholson, Royal Navy (Retired).
- Commander Edward Owen Figuls Price, Royal Navy (Haverfordwest).
- Commander Hugh Smith Pugh, Royal Navy (Retired) (Banstead, Surrey).
- Commander Ernest Henry Shattock, Royal Navy (Cowdon, Kent).
- Commander Stanley Lloyd Medlicott Vereker, Royal Navy (Retired).
- Acting Commander Henry Leslie Spofforth Baker, Royal Navy.
- Acting Commander Harold Mitchell Blake, Royal Navy (Retired).
- Acting Commander Walter James Melrose, D.S.C., Royal Navy (Tasmania).
- Major Horatio McCullough Slater, Royal Marines.
- Acting Major William John Stuart, Royal Marines (Retired).
- Commander Frederick Cuthbert Hartley, R.D., R.N.R. (Retired).
- Commander John Swift Sharp, R.D., R.N.R. (Hereford).
- Temporary Acting Commander (A) John Bernard Walter Pugh, R.N.V.R.
- Acting Temporary Commander William Thomas Marsh.
- Commander (A) Robert Hedley Selborne Rodger, Royal Navy.
- Engineer Commander Ernest Bernard Collins, Royal Navy (Dorking).
- Engineer Commander John Reginald Davis, Royal Navy (Retired) (Nailsworth, Gloucestershire).
- Commander (E) John Garnett Cranston Given, Royal Navy.
- Commander (E) Eric Leo Jack Howell, Royal Navy (Milford on Sea, Hants.).
- Senior Commander (temporary Chief Commander) Beatrice Ethel Lithiby, M.B.E., Auxiliary Territorial Service.
- Major Roger Mead, Assistant Political Officer, Central and Southern Area, Iraq.
- Commander (E) Iain Gilleasburg MacLean, Royal Navy (Edinburgh).
- Commander (E) Arnold Rudolf Newman, Royal Navy (Cotterstock, Peterborough).
- Commander (E) Henry Rawlinson Laycock, R.D., R.N.R.
- Temporary Commander (E) Hugh McMaster, R.N.R.
- Surgeon Commander Robert William Higgins, Royal Navy.
- Paymaster Commander Alan Melville Ackery, Royal Navy.
- Paymaster Commander Hugh Thomas Isaac, Royal Navy.
- Lieutenant-Commander Edward Walter Moncton, Royal Navy (Umberleigh, North Devon).
- Lieutenant-Commander William Henry Wakelin Mathews, R.D., R.N.R.
- Acting Lieutenant-Commander Robert Alexander Allan, R.N.V.R.
- Paymaster Lieutenant-Commander Alfred Charles Waugh, M.B.E., Royal Navy (Retired) (Sanderstead, Surrey).
- Paymaster Lieutenant-Commander Thomas Patrick White, Royal Navy (Retired) (Kirk Ella, Hull).
- The Reverend John Henry Ogilvie, Chaplain, Royal Navy.
- Miss Ella Faith Stubbs, Chief Officer, W.R.N.S.
- Captain Richard D. Williams, Master, R.F.A. (Commander, R.N.R., Retired).
- Mr Clifford Neville Ansell, Chief Engineer Officer, R.F.A.
- Major (temporary Lieutenant-Colonel) James Edgar Adamson, D.S.O., Pioneer Corps.
- Major (temporary Lieutenant-Colonel) Kenneth Charles Baglehole, T.D., Royal Artillery, Territorial Army.
- Major (temporary Lieutenant-Colonel) Oswald Herbert Campbell Balfour, C.M.G., The King's Royal Rifle Corps.
- Major (temporary Lieutenant-Colonel) Hilaro Nelson Barlow, Parachute Regiment, Army Air Corps.
- Lieutenant-Colonel William Joseph Barwell, Gloucestershire Home Guard.
- Lieutenant-Colonel (temporary Colonel) William Horace Gladstone Beard, 2nd Punjab Regiment, Indian Army.
- Lieutenant-Colonel Bhajjan Singh, Indian States Forces.
- Major (Staff Paymaster 2nd Class) (temporary Lieutenant-Colonel, Staff Paymaster 1st Class) Malcolm Blair, Royal Army Pay Corps.
- Lieutenant-Colonel Jeffrey Armstrong Blood, 12th Frontier Force Regiment, Indian Army.
- Major (temporary Lieutenant-Colonel) Reginald Alexander Bicks, Indian Army Ordnance Corps.
- Major (temporary Lieutenant-Colonel) Milner Hall Board, Royal Engineers, Territorial Army.
- Major (temporary Lieutenant-Colonel) Henry Boardman, D.S.O., M.C., The King's Regiment (Liverpool).
- Lieutenant-Colonel (Staff Paymaster 1st Class) (temporary Colonel, Chief Paymaster) Benjamin Luke Burgess, Royal Army Pay Corps.
- Major (temporary Lieutenant-Colonel) Arthur Trevor Thompson Card, The King's Own Royal Regiment (Lancaster).
- Major (temporary Lieutenant-Colonel) Cyril Frederick Charles Coleman, The Welch Regiment.
- Colonel John Gordon Crabbe, M.C., Territorial Army.
- Lieutenant-Colonel (temporary Brigadier) Gerald Philip Crampton, M.C., Indian Army.
- Lieutenant-Colonel Guy Pascoe Crowden, T.D., M.R.C.P., Royal Army Medical Corps, Territorial Army.
- Major (temporary Lieutenant-Colonel) Cyril William Daborn, M.C., Royal Engineers.
- Lieutenant-Colonel Frederick Schlater Dapp, Cheshire Home Guard.
- Major Basil Darbyshire, M.C., T.D., Royal Artillery, Territorial Army.
- Senior Commander (temporary Chief Commander) Constance Pamela Alice, Baroness Digby, Auxiliary Territorial Service.
- Colonel Edgar John Humphreys Douch, late Royal Artillery.
- Major (temporary Lieutenant-Colonel) (acting Colonel) Andrew Henry Earley, Royal Engineers.
- Major (temporary Lieutenant-Colonel) Philip Mawbey Edgell, Royal Army Service Corps.
- Lieutenant-Colonel John Francis Edwards, The South Wales Borderers.
- Major (temporary Lieutenant-Colonel) Richard Everard Augustine Elwes, Northamptonshire Yeomanry, Royal Armoured Corps.
- Major (temporary Lieutenant-Colonel) George Drew Fanshawe, Royal Artillery.
- Major (temporary Lieutenant-Colonel) Geoffrey William Ferrand, Royal Artillery, Territorial Army.
- Colonel Norman Sydney Ferris, E.D., Southern Rhodesia Territorial Forces.
- Lieutenant-Colonel (temporary Brigadier) Richard Gardiner, Royal Engineers.
- Major (Commissary) Thomas Gates, D.C.M., Royal Indian Army Service Corps.
- Senior Commander (temporary Chief Commander) Edith Maud Gell, Auxiliary Territorial Service.
- Lieutenant-Colonel William Edward Gibbons, T.D., The South Staffordshire Regiment, Territorial Army.
- Lieutenant-Colonel Ogilvie Blair Graham, D.S.O., Royal Artillery, Territorial Army.
- Lieutenant-Colonel (temporary Colonel) (temporary Brigadier) Laurence Douglas Grand, M.B.E., Royal Engineers.
- Lieutenant-Colonel John Riddell Musgrave Hanna, 1st Punjab Regiment, Indian Army.
- Lieutenant-Colonel and Brevet Colonel Norman Bassett Hart, T.D., Royal Engineers, Territorial Army.
- Major (temporary Lieutenant-Colonel) Norman Synnot Hart, The Buffs (Royalo East Kent Regiment).
- Captain (temporary Major) (local Lieutenant-Colonel) Arthur Cecil Hoey.
- Lieutenant-Colonel Alwyn Vesey Holt, D.S.O., The Black Watch (Royal Highland Regiment).
- Major (Ordnance Officer 3rd Class) John Lawrence Hume, Royal Army Ordnance Corps.
- Chaplain to the Forces 3rd Class the Reverend Canon Alfred Vincent Hurley, M.A., Royal Army Chaplains Department, Territorial Army.
- Lieutenant-Colonel Christopher Allan Hector Perera Jayawardana, M.B.E., E. D., Ceylon Light Infantry.
- Major (Electrical and Mechanical Engineer 2nd Class) (temporary Lieutenant-Colonel, Electrical and Mechanical Engineer 1st Class) John Carnt Jefferson, A.M.I.E.E., Royal Electrical and Mechanical Engineers.
- Major (temporary Lieutenant-Colonel) Eric Malcolm Davies-Jenkins, The Welch Regiment.
- Lieutenant-Colonel (acting Colonel) Charles Champion Jerome Kellie, 1st Punjab Regiment, Indian Army.
- Major (temporary Lieutenant-Colonel) William Charles Kilvington, Royal Army Ordnance Corps.
- Captain (temporary Major) Victor Knott, Indian Army.
- Lieutenant-Colonel (temporary Brigadier) Eric Wilfred Langlands, Indian Army.
- Lieutenant-Colonel William Herbert Lester, Carnarvonshire Home Guard.
- Major (temporary Lieutenant-Colonel) William Charles Likeman, Army Educational Corps.
- Major (temporary Lieutenant-Colonel) John Hedley Gallier Lillywhite, The Lincolnshire Regiment.
- Major (temporary Lieutenant-Colonel) (local Colonel) William Herbert Horatio Lindquist, M.C., 1st King George V.'s Own Gurkha Rifles, Indian Army.
- Senior Commander (temporary Chief Commander) Beatrice Ethel Lithiby, M.B.E., Auxiliary Territorial Service.
- Lieutenant-Colonel (Ordnance Officer 2nd Class) Walter Edward Lionel Long, C.I.E., Royal Army Ordnance Corps.
- Lieutenant-Colonel (temporary Colonel) Hugh Pelham Mackley, The Cameronians (Scottish Rifles).
- Major (temporary Lieutenant-Colonel) Norman MacLeod, The Royal Scots Fusiliers.
- Lieutenant-Colonel Charles Hulbert Madden, M.C., Sussex Home Guard.
- Major Edward Frederick Maude, Royal Artillery.
- Temporary Major James Hamilton Mitchell, Southern Rhodesia Territorial Forces.
- Major (temporary Lieutenant-Colonel) Robert Edward Moss, Royal Army Ordnance Corps.
- Lieutenant-Colonel (temporary Colonel) Diwan Bahadur Gudapakham Narasimhula Naidu, Indian Army.
- Major (temporary Lieutenant-Colonel) Cosmo Alexander Richard Nevill, The Royal Fusiliers (City of London Regiment).
- Captain (temporary Major) (acting Lieutenant-Colonel) Francis John Noakes, The Manchester Regiment, Territorial Army.
- Major Harry Oppenheimer, Burma Auxiliary Force.
- Lieutenant-Colonel (temporary Colonel) Henry Paterson, Indian Army Ordnance Corps.
- Major (temporary Lieutenant-Colonel) Robert Rawnsley Maxwell Perceval, M.C., Royal Artillery.
- Lieutenant-Colonel Cornelius Theodore Pollard, Middlesex Home Guard.
- Major Dacre Hamilton Powell, M.C., Indian Army.
- Lieutenant-Colonel Bernard Vivian Ramsden, The Green Howards (Alexandra, Princess of Wales's Own Yorkshire Regiment).
- Major (temporary Lieutenant-Colonel) Joseph Harold William Garner Richards, Royal Artillery.
- Major (temporary Lieutenant-Colonel) Abdy Henry Gough Ricketts, The Durham Light Infantry.
- Major (temporary Lieutenant-Colonel) William Lancelot Rolleston, Royal Engineers.
- Major (temporary Lieutenant-Colonel) the Honourable Leopold Oliver Russell, The Bedfordshire and Hertfordshire Regiment, Territorial Army.
- Major (temporary Lieutenant-Colonel) Ronald Davidson Reed Sale, T.D., The Oxfordshire and B4ckinghamshire Light Infantry, Territorial Army.
- Major (temporary Lieutenant-Colonel) William Baines Sallitt, Royal Engineers.
- Colonel Francis Robert Archibald Shiel, D.S.O., T.D., Durham Home Guard.
- Lieutenant-Colonel James MacLure Smellie, M.D., F.R.C.P., Royal Army Medical Corps, Territorial Army.
- Lieutenant-Colonel George Bingham Still, Indian Armoured Corps.
- Colonel Harrington Rivers Stranack, late Royal Artillery.
- Lieutenant-Colonel Reginald Charles Strologo, General List.
- Major (temporary Lieutenant-Colonel) Arthur Leslie Taffs, The Royal Berkshire Regiment (Princess Charlotte of Wales's).
- Major (temporary Lieutenant-Colonel) William Heathcote Tatham, The Royal Fusiliers (City of London Regiment), Territorial Army.
- Lieutenant-Colonel Francis Lewis Tempest, M.C., Suffolk Home Guard.
- Major (temporary Lieutenant-Colonel) Edward Chamberlain Thompson, B.A., Royal Corps of Signals.
- Lieutenant-Colonel Harold Vaughan von Suchin Thorne, Royal Corps of Signals.
- Major (temporary Lieutenant-Colonel) Valentine Michael Vincent Tighe, Royal Armoured Corps.
- Major (temporary Lieutenant-Colonel) (acting Colonel) Donald Charles Essery Tozer, M.C., Royal Indian Army Service Corps.
- Lieutenant-Colonel Mervyn Savile Wheatley, A.M.I.E.E., Royal Corps of Signals.
- Major (temporary Lieutenant-Colonel) Edgar Cuthbert Freemantle Whitehead, M.A., Royal Army Service Corps.
- Lieutenant-Colonel David Murdoch Wilkie, T.D., Ayrshire Home Guard.
- Major (temporary Lieutenant-Colonel) Arthur Robert Owen Williams, Royal Engineers.
- Lieutenant-Colonel Sidney Andrew Wise, M.C., Home Guard.
- Wing Commander Arthur John Brister, Royal Air Force.
- Wing Commander Niel Ballingal Reid Bromley, Royal Air Force.
- Wing Commander Henry William Terrell Chalcraft, Southern Rhodesian Air Force and Royal Air Force Volunteer Reserve.
- Wing Commander (now Acting Group Captain) Harold Edward Dicken, Royal Air Force.
- Wing Commander (now Acting Group Captain) Cecil Wood Flemming, D.M., M.Ch., F.R.C.S., L.R.C.P., Royal Air Force Volunteer Reserve.
- Wing Commander Phillip Walter Howson, Royal Australian Air Force.
- Wing Commander Arthur Gladdish Trevenen James, Reserve of Air Force Officers.
- Wing Commander William Henry King, Royal Air Force.
- Wing Commander (now Acting Group Captain) John Victor Read, M.B.E., Royal Air Force.
- Wing Commander Edwin Seymour Steddy, Royal Air Force Volunteer Reserve.
- Wing Commander Norman Alexander Tait, Royal Air Force.
- Wing Commander (now Acting Group Captain) James Benjamin Tatnall, Reserve of Air Force Officers.
- Wing Commander William Arthur Thompson, Royal Air Force.
- Wing Commander (now Acting Group Captain) Frederick William Todd, Royal Air Force.
- Wing Commander Norman Wood, Royal Air Force Volunteer Reserve.
- Acting Wing Commander Lewis Henry Charles Auys, Royal Air Force.
- Acting Wing Commander Richard Douglas Barlas, Royal Air Force Volunteer Reserve.
- Acting Wing Commander Ernest Trevor Beer, Royal Air Force Volunteer Reserve.
- Acting Wing Commander Harry Frederick Cook, M.B.E., Royal Air Force.
- Acting Wing Commander James Birchby Cottam, Royal Air Force Volunteer Reserve.
- Acting Wing Commander George Calder Cunningham, Royal Air Force Volunteer Reserve.
- Acting Wing Commander Edward Fennessy, Royal Air Force V61unteer Reserve.
- Acting Wing Commander Athol Stanhope Forbes, D.F.C., Reserve of Ail Force Officers.
- Acting Wing Commander Anthony Reay Mackay Geddes, Royal Air Force Volunteer Reserve.
- Acting Wing Commander Kenneth Oliver George Huntley, Royal Air Force Volunteer Reserve.
- Acting Wing Commander Alfred Cotteril Kermode, Royal Air Force Volunteer Reserve.
- Acting Wing Commander Terence Wilson Tyrell McComb, Royal Air Force.
- Acting Wing Commander Geoffrey Springle McDougall, Royal Canadian Air Force.
- Acting Wing Commander Patrick John Meade, Royal Air Force Volunteer Reserve.
- Acting Wing Commander John Burton Newman, M.B.E., Royal Air Force Volunteer Reserve.
- Acting Wing Commander George Nigel Ricks, Royal Air Force Volunteer Reserve.
- Acting Wing Commander James Baguley Schofield, Royal Air Force Volunteer Reserve.
- Acting Wing Commander (now Acting Group Captain) Andrew Alex Dick Sevastopulo, Royal Air Force Volunteer Reserve.
- Acting Wing Commander Harry Sherwood, Auxiliary Air Force.
- Acting Wing Commander Horace John Audley Thewles, Reserve of Air Force Officers.
- Acting Wing Commander Wells Wintermute Coates, Royal Air Force Volunteer Reserve.
- Acting Wing Commander Sinclair Charles Wood, Royal Air Force Volunteer Reserve.
- Lieutenant-Colonel Oscar Galgut, South African Air Force.
- Squadron Leader William John Hendley, M.B.E., Royal Air Force.
- Squadron Leader John Edward George McGibbon, M.B., B.S., D.L.O., Auxiliary Air Force.
- Squadron Leader Harold Jephcott Tanburn, Royal Air Force Volunteer Reserve.
- Acting Squadron Leader William Brenton Boggs, Royal Canadian Air Force.
- Acting Squadron Leader Geoffrey Gillman Cradock-Watson, Royal Air Force Volunteer Reserve.
- Acting Squadron Leader Alexander Cross, Royal Air Force.
- Acting Squadron Leader Francis James Bilian Hammersley, Royal Air Force Volunteer Reserve.
- Acting Squadron Leader Eric Arthur Douglas Heath, Royal Air Force Volunteer Reserve.
- Acting Squadron Leader Oliver Arthur Gildart Jackson, Royal Air Force Volunteer Reserve.
- Acting Squadron Leader John Callistus Kilkenny, Royal Air Force Volunteer Reserve.
- Acting Squadron Leader Herbert Stephen King, Royal .Air Force.
- Acting Squadron Leader James Francis Mehigan, Royal Air Force.
- Acting Squadron Leader Gerald Alan Morris, Royal Air Force Volunteer Reserve.
- Acting Squadron Leader Trenhan Christopher Musgrave, Reserve of Air Force Officers.
- Acting Squadron Leader William Edward Nicholas, D.F.C., Royal Air Force.
- Acting Squadron Leader Edgar Alexander Pask, Royal Air Force Volunteer Reserve.
- Acting Squadron Leader Edward Charles Smith-Ross, Reserve of Air Force Officers.
- Acting Squadron Leader John Duggan Syme, Royal Air Force Volunteer Reserve.
- Acting Squadron Leader Guy Parker Watson, D.F.C., Royal Air Force.
- Acting Squadron Leader William Whittle, Royal Air Force Volunteer Reserve.
- Acting Squadron Officer Marjorie Ryley, Women's Auxiliary Air Force.

Australia:

- Lieutenant-Commander Eric Augustus Feldt, Royal Australian Navy.
- Lieutenant-Colonel Cyril Richard Cole, Australian Military Forces.
- Lieutenant-Colonel Alan Percy Crisp, D.S.O., V.D., Australian Military Forces.
- Wing Commander Donald Holdsworth Brown, Royal Australian Air Force.
- Wing Commander John Owen Parker Dibbs, Royal Australian Air Force.

New Zealand:

- Acting Captain Douglas Alfred Bingley, Royal New Zealand Navy.
- Major Donald Victor Thomas, New Zealand Military Forces.
- Lieutenant-Colonel (temporary Colonel) Claude Spencer White, V.D., New Zealand Military Forces.
- Miss Ida Grace Willis, R.R.C., Matron-in-Chief, New Zealand Army Nursing Service.
- Squadron Leader Reginald James Gibbs, Royal New Zealand Air Force.

Honorary:

- Abdel Qader Pasha el Jundi, Amir Lewa, Arab Legion.

Civil Division

- Captain Robert Chevallier Cooke, M.C. (Retired), District Commissioner, Sudan Political Service.
- Martha Isabel, Mrs. Garvice, M.B.E., Senior Lady Medical Officer, Egyptian Ministry of Education.
- William Cumming Graham, Esq., His Majesty's Consul at Bilbao.
- George Nicholas Jones, Esq., Honorary Representative of the British Council in Chile.
- William Charles Godfrey Mackinnon, a British subject resident in the Argentine Republic.
- Major Roger Mead, Assistant Political Officer, Central and Southern Area, Iraq.
- Francis Brian Anthony Rundall, Esq., one of His Majesty's Vice-Consuls at New York.
- Charles Merrill Schaffter, Esq., M.B., Ch.B., F.R.C.S. (Ed.), Surgeon working in Church Missionary Hospitals in Persia.
- Peter Frank Dalrymple Tennant, Esq., Press Attaché at His Majesty's Legation at Stockholm.
- Maud, Mrs. Tiplady, a British subject resident in Brazil.
- Thomas Wikeley, Esq., His Majesty's Consul at Jedda.
- George Richard Rich Nicholas, Esq. For philanthropic services in the State of Victoria.
- Miss Jane Bell, President, Royal Victorian College of Nursing, State of Victoria.
- Lieutenant-Colonel the Honourable Archibald Clifford Blacklow, D.S.O., V.D., Member of the Legislative Council, State of Tasmania. For public and municipal services.
- William Andrew Burrell, Esq. For social welfare services in the State of Victoria.
- Arthur Gilmour Cowling, Esq., M.C., Chief Education Officer, Southern Rhodesia.
- Theodore Albert Edward Holdengarde, Esq., Chairman of the National Industrial Council for the Iron and Steel Manufacturing and Engineering Industries of Southern Rhodesia.
- Dudley Mathews, Esq. For services in connection with charitable and patriotic movements in the State of South Australia.
- Francis Martin O'Leary, Esq., a Member of the Finance Committee, Newfoundland Patriotic Association.
- Eric Charles Price, Esq., Deputy Food Controller, Newfoundland, and formerly Chairman of the Board of Customs, Newfoundland.
- Lieutenant-Colonel Alick Vernie Stark, E. D., late 15th Oxley Regiment, Official and Private Secretary to the Governor of the State of Queensland.
- Alfred Herman Traeger, Esq., of the State of South Australia. For public services in connection with wireless inventions.
- Augusta Maud, Lady Wallace, M.B.E., Honorary Secretary and Treasurer, Scottish Branch of the Victoria League, and member of the Scottish Committee of the Empire Societies' War Hospitality Committee.
- Margaret Wilkie, Lady Bhore, M.B.E., M.B., Ch.B. (wife of Sir Joseph Bhore, K.C.S.I., K.C.I.E., Economic Adviser to the Government of Bhopal), Central India.
- Pritamdas Bhojraj Advani, Esq., M.I.E., Director of Industries, Bombay.
- Akhter Husain, Esq., Indian Civil Service, Deputy Commissioner, Sialkot, Punjab.
- Ernest Brian Hindley Baker, Esq., Indian Civil Service, Secretary to His Excellency the Governor of Bengal.
- Joseph Charles Brommage, Esq., M.B.E., Joint Financial Adviser (Munitions Production), Government of India.
- Ivor Bull, Esq., Coffee Planter and Member of Coorg Legislative Council.
- Reginald Glanville Burt, Esq., Assistant Controller-General of Inspection (Civil Wing), General Headquarters, India.
- Hadden Hamilton Carleston, Esq., Indian Civil Service, Chief Civil Representative, Indian Infantry Division, and lately Collector and District Magistrate, Civil and Military Station, Bangalore.
- Leonard Alfred Chapman, Esq., Indian Civil Service, Joint Financial Adviser (Supply), Government of India.
- George Alfred Davies Cochrane, Esq., Indian Service of Engineers, Superintendent of Works, Public Works Department, Central Provinces and Berar.
- Major Leopold Henry Conville, Landholder, Deputy Recruiting Officer, Montgomery, Punjab.
- Khan Bahadur Ghulam Faruque, Controller of Coal Distribution and Transport Advisory Officer.
- Ramaswami Ayyangar Gopalaswami, Esq., Indian Civil Service, Deputy Secretary to the Government of India in the Defence Department and Secretary, National Defence Council.
- Herbert Hawley, Esq., F.I.C., Government Analyst, King Institute of Preventive Medicine, Guindy, Madras.
- Kenneth Harvey Henderson, Esq., Indian Civil Service, Deputy Commissioner, Lahore, Punjab.
- Kamta Prashad, Esq., Indian Educational Service, Principal, Science College, Patna, Bihar.
- Wilfred Lawley, Esq., Indian Service of Engineers, Superintending Engineer, Public Works Department, North-West Frontier Province.
- Idris Wyn Lewys-Lloyd, Esq., Indian Civil Service, Deputy Commissioner, Lucknow, United Provinces.
- Alastair Petrie Low, Esq., Indian Political Service, Deputy Commissioner, Bannu, North-West Frontier Province.
- Andrew Francis MacCulloch, Esq., M.B.E., F.I.C., A.M.I.Chem.E., Chief Advisory Chemist, Office of the Director-General, Indian Medical Service.
- John Edwin Mackenzie, Esq., D.Sc., Ph.D., University Adviser to Indian Students, Edinburgh.
- Jaswantsingh Malik, Esq., Indian Service of Engineers, Superintending Engineer, Sind.
- Major Anthony Gilchrist McCall, Indian Civil Service, Deputy Commissioner, Khasi and Jantia Hills and Political Officer, Khasi States, Assam.
- William Malcolm McGregor, Esq., Chief Controller of Stores, North-Western Railway.
- James Dunbar Michael, Esq., Secretary to the Railway Board, Government of India.
- Philip Norton-Jones, Esq., Indian Police, Deputy Commissioner of Police, Calcutta, Bengal.
- U Olim Singh, Siem of the Khyrim State, Assam.
- Pran Krishna Parija, Esq., Indian Educational Service, Principal, Ravenshaw College, Cuttack, Orissa.
- Gordon Peace, Esq., F.I.C., Chief Inspector of Explosives in India and Chief Adviser, Factory A.R.P.
- Cornelius James Pelly, Esq., Indian Political Service, Political Agent and His Majesty's Consul, Muscat, Persian Gulf.
- Major Louis Alexander Gordon Pinhey, Indian Political Service, Political Agent and Deputy Commissioner, Sibi, and lately Wazir-i-Azam, Kalat State, Baluchistan.
- John Erskine Pitcairn, Esq„ V.D., Assistant Manager, Messrs. Peirce Leslie and Company, Cochin.
- Hugh Edward Richardson, Esq., Indian Political Service, Secretary to the Agent-General for India at Chungking.
- Lieutenant-Colonel Claude Innes Shepherd, D.S.O., Indian Army (retired), Honorary Secretary, Indian Comforts Fund, London.
- Hiranand Rupchand Shivdasani, Esq., Indian Civil Service, Collector and District Magistrate, Agra, United Provinces.
- John Gerald Simms, Esq., Indian Civil Service, Collector and District Magistrate, Ahmedabad, Bombay.
- Malcolm Moncrieff Stuart, Esq., Indian Civil Service, District Magistrate, Chittagong, Bengal.
- Alexander Colin Burlington Symon, Esq., Secretary, Indian Purchasing Mission at Washington.
- Sardar Shivrao Bhavanrao Thorat, Jahagirdar of Panodi, and First-Class Sardar of the Deccan, Ahmednagar District, Bombay.
- Frederick Lewis Undenvood, Esq., Indian Police, District Superintendent of Police, Madras.
- Charles Ernest Walze, Esq., District Magistrate and Collector of Gaya, Bihar.

=== Member of the Most Excellent Order of the British Empire (MBE) ===
- Temporary Lieutenant-Commander (E) David Butchart Simpson, R.N.R. (Bebington, Cheshire).
- Acting Lieutenant-Commander Morgan Charles Giles, G.M., Royal Navy.
- Acting Temporary Paymaster Lieutenant Commander William Hector Reed, R.N.R. (Gateshead, Co. Durham).
- Lieutenant Thomas Horsman Bandy, Royal Navy (Portsmouth).
- Lieutenant John Peel Dixon, Royal Navy (Bournemouth).
- Lieutenant William Gordon Meeke, D.S.C., Royal Navy.
- Lieutenant Arthur Robert Phillips, Royal Navy (Retired).
- Lieutenant Charles William Green, R.N.R. (Penarth).
- Lieutenant (Temporary) Asgar Gunnar Hansen, R.N.R.
- Temporary Lieutenant William Barrie, R.N.V.R. (Rhu, Dumbartonshire).
- Temporary Lieutenant John, Norman Edwards, R.N.V.R. (Motherwell, Lancashire).
- Temporary Lieutenant Frank Sydney Petty, R.N.V.R., H.M.S. St. Angelo.
- Lieutenant (E) Gerald Phillip Henwood, Royal Navy (Grange over Sands).
- Lieutenant (E) William Henry Stubbings, Royal Navy.
- Temporary Lieutenant (E) Harold Oswald Brown, R.N.V.R. (Hertford).
- Temporary Lieutenant (E) George Murdoch Wright, R.N.V.R. (Monkseaton, Northumberland).
- Acting Lieutenant (E) Albert James Thomas Wall, Royal Navy (Tumey, Gloucestershire).
- Paymaster Lieutenant Reginald Nevill da Costa Porter, Royal Navy (Merstham, Surrey).
- Paymaster Lieutenant Francis Piedade Rosario Noronha, Royal Indian Navy.
- Temporary Electrical Lieutenant Douglas Julian Cater, R.N.V.R. (London).
- Shipwright Lieutenant George Emmerson, Royal Navy (Retired) (Gosport).
- Wardmaster Lieutenant Maurice Aubrey Ball, Royal Navy (Retired) (Plymouth).
- Lieutenant Douglas Byron Armstrong, R.C.N.V.R. (Toronto).
- Temporary Skipper James William Brown, R.N.R. (Grimsby).
- Staff Sergeant Major (Acting Lieutenant) William Joseph Flanagan, Royal Marines (Barnhurst, Kent) (Retired).
- Mr Daniel Richard Saunders, Temporary Boatswain, Royal Navy (Portland).
- Mr Arthur Dunn, Commissioned Engineer, Royal Navy.
- Mr William Henry Metherell, Warrant Engineer, Royal Navy (Weymouth).
- Mr Thomas William Stibbards, Temporary Warrant Engineer, Royal Navy.
- Mr William Webb, Temporary Warrant Engineer, Royal Navy.
- Mr Patrick Michael Swiney, Warrant Telegraphist, Royal Navy (Dublin).
- Mr Jack Beane, Temporary Warrant Shipwright, Royal Navy.
- Mr Charles Henry Evans, Temporary Warrant Ordnance Officer, Royal Navy (Haverfordwest).
- Superintending Clerk Frederick Baker, Royal Marines (Plymouth).
- Mr Ralph North, Commissioned Writer, Royal Navy (Plymouth).
- Mr John Samuel Mathias, Temporary Warrant Writer, Royal Navy (Wingfield).
- Mr Gcorge Edward Morris, Warrant Supply Officer, Royal Navy.
- Mr Louis Clarence Raymond Keen, Warrant Cook, Royal Navy (Herne Bay).
- Mr John Stuart Godfrey, Gunner, Royal Australian Navy.
- Captain Cecil Leon Vivian Dury, Master, R.F.A.
- Mr Leonard George Hosking, First Radio Officer.
- Miss Helen Elizabeth Archdale, Second Officer, W.R.N.S. (Borough Green, Kent).
- Miss Diana Valerie Chaworth-Musters, Third Officer, W.R.N.S. (Colchester).
- Captain (temporary Major) William Jonathan Aedy, Royal Engineers.
- Major (Commissary) (temporary Lieutenant-Colonel) Joseph Charles Alford, Indian Army Ordnance Corps.
- Captain (Quartermaster) William Alfred Alger, The North Staffordshire Regiment (The Prince of Wales's).
- Lieutenant (temporary Captain) Arthur Southey Allan, The Leicestershire Regiment.
- Lieutenant (temporary Captain) Henry Fernside Anderson, Pioneer Corps.
- Lieutenant (Quartermaster) Charles Davidson Arthur, Royal Armoured Corps.
- Captain Clifford Joseph Thomas Ash, City of London Home Guard.
- Captain (Quartermaster) (acting Major) George Ashton, Royal Army Medical Corps.
- Captain Reginald Edward John Atkins, City of London Home Guard.
- Captain (temporary Major) John Langshaw Austin, Intelligence Corps.
- Lieutenant Edward Frank Baker, General List.
- Captain (Quartermaster) Albert Edward Balchin, Royal Artillery.
- Captain (temporary Major) Albert Henry Ball, Pioneer Corps.
- Lieutenant Anil Behari Saran, The Bihar Regiment, Indian Army.
- Regimental Sergeant-Major George Benfield, Royal Corps of Signals.
- Captain (temporary Major) (acting Colonel) John Hardy Bentley, Pioneer Corps.
- Lieutenant (Quartermaster) William Seward Bessant, Royal Artillery.
- Lieutenant Arthur Reginald Bill, Royal Engineers.
- Lieutenant (temporary Captain) Arnold George Billington, Royal Corps of Signals.
- Lieutenant (Quartermaster) Ernest Boddy, Pioneer Corps.
- Major (Quartermaster) John Reginald Harper Bolingbroke, D.C.M., The Dorsetshire Regiment.
- Lieutenant (acting Captain) Charles Brodie, Burma Army.
- Captain (Quartermaster) Ernest Robin Brown, The Herefordshire Regiment, Territorial Army.
- Captain (Quartermaster) Thomas Charles Richard Bryant, The Herefordshire Regiment, Territorial Army.
- Sergeant-Major Thomas Alfred Bullet, The King's Bodyguard of the Yeomen of the Guard.
- Captain (temporary Major) Edward Bernard Burke, The King's Own Royal Regiment (Lancaster).
- Lieutenant (temporary Captain) (Deputy Commissary) Henry Albert Ernest Burrage, Indian Army Corps of Clerks.
- Captain (acting Major) John Henry Busby, The Bedfordshire and Hertfordshire Regiment.
- Captain Richard James Cairns, Royal Army Medical Corps.
- Captain (temporary Major) Charles Henry Calder, Royal Engineers.
- Major Frank Sydney Harvey-Cant, Essex Home Guard.
- Lieutenant (Quartermaster) (temporary Major) William Henry Carlton, Royal Army Medical Corps.
- Battery Sergeant Major George Catland, Royal Artillery (since transferred to Army Air Corps).
- Lieutenant George Clifford Catt, Royal Engineers.
- Captain (temporary Major) Eric Sackville Wildman Cattley, The Hampshire Regiment.
- Lieutenant (temporary Captain) Leonard Allan Chapman, The King's Own Yorkshire Light Infantry.
- Captain (temporary Major) Charles Herbert Chapple, Royal Engineers.
- Lieutenant (temporary Captain) John Maurice Clark, Royal Engineers.
- Lieutenant George Edward Clarke, Indian Army.
- Lieutenant Edwin Joseph Clother, Buckinghamshire Home Guard.
- Staff Sergeant Major Leonard Harry Cole, Royal Army Service Corps.
- Captain (temporary Major) (Commissary) Walter Coleman, Royal Indian Army Service Corps.
- Staff Sergeant Major William Thomas Cyril Coles, Royal Army Pay Corps.
- Regimental Sergeant-Major Eric Crawley Conner, The Cameronians (Scottish Rifles).
- Sub Conductor Nelson George Cooke, Royal Army Ordnance Corps.
- Captain (Quartermaster) Cyril Harvey Cotes, Extra Regimentally Employed List.
- Captain (temporary Major) John Nicholls Franklin Cotterell, Royal Artillery.
- Lieutenant (Quartermaster) (temporary Captain) Sidney Arthur Cox, The King's Royal Rifle Corps.
- Captain (temporary Major) Alfred Leonard Craddock, M.B. (London), B.S., Burma Army.
- Captain (temporary Major) George Ernest Crouch, Army Educational Corps.
- Junior Commander (temporary Senior Commander) Mabel Flora Mary Davin, Auxiliary Territorial Service.
- Captain (Quartermaster) (temporary Major) Albert Frederick Day, Royal Engineers.
- Major Harry Dean, Nottinghamshire Home Guard.
- Major William George Dent, West Riding Home Guard.
- Captain (Quartermaster) Charles Harry Ditcham, Royal Artillery.
- Chaplain to the Forces 4th Class the Reverend Ronald John Eteson Dix, Royal Army Chaplains Department.
- Regimental Quartermaster Sergeant Harry Percy Noel Dunn, Welsh Guards.
- Regimental Sergeant Major Percy Dunne, Welsh Guards.
- Captain (temporary Major) Maurice Nicholson Durlac, Royal Artillery.
- Captain (temporary Major) (Commissary) Frederick William Dwelly, Indian Engineers, Indian Army.
- 2nd Subaltern (acting Junior Commander) (Mrs.) Mary Alice Dyson, Women's Auxiliary Corps (India).
- Sub Conductor Wallace Samuel Evans, Royal Army Ordnance Corps.
- Captain Donald Norman Albert Fairweather, British Honduras Volunteer Force.
- Captain (Quartermaster) Philip Edmund Felstead, Royal Artillery, Territorial Army.
- Major (temporary Lieutenant-Colonel) Norman Hayward Finch, Royal Army Ordnance Corps.
- Lieutenant-Colonel Francis Thomas Fletcher, Army Cadet Force.
- Chaplain to the Forces 4th Class the Reverend Gerard Bernard Flint, Royal Army Chaplains Department.
- Regimental Sergeant Major Frederick Foley, Scots Guards.
- Lieutenant (temporary Captain) Henry Thomas Hamilton Foley, The Rifle Brigade (Prince Consort's Own).
- Major Frederick John Ford, Cambridgeshire Home Guard.
- Captain (temporary Major) Cecil Frederick Gardner, The South Staffordshire Regiment.
- Lieutenant William Henry Gee, M.M., Kent Home Guard.
- Lieutenant (temporary Captain) (Deputy Commissary) Ronald James Ghey, Indian Army Corps of Clerks.
- Captain (temporary Major) Brian Nothan Gibbs, Welsh Guards.
- Regimental Quartermaster Sergeant Samuel Gibbs, Royal Army Service Corps.
- Lieutenant (temporary Captain) Frederick Walter Gilbert, The Queen's Royal Regiment (West Surrey).
- Staff Sergeant Major Ronald Gilbert, Royal Army Service Corps.
- Lieutenant Thomas William Gill, 14th/20th King's Hussars.
- Junior Commander (temporary Senior Commander) Bella Dalgarno Gillespie, Auxiliary Territorial Service.
- Captain (Quartermaster) Charles Edwin Goodall, Royal Armoured Corps.
- Captain (Quartermaster) Albert Edgar Grant, The Royal Norfolk Regiment, Territorial Army.
- Major James Wadham Grant, Royal Artillery.
- Captain (temporary Major) John Mackenzie Grant, 14th Punjab Regiment, Indian Army.
- Regimental Sergeant-Major William John Gray, Royal Artillery.
- Captain Frederick Charles Greenwood, South Caribbean Forces.
- Chaplain to the Forces 4th Class the Reverend William Reginald Griffths, Royal Army Chaplains Department.
- Captain (temporary Major) George Edward Gunning, M.C., General List.
- Regimental Sergeant-Major Florence Maud Hadley, Auxiliary Territorial Service.
- Captain (Quartermaster) Sidney Hamlett, The Cheshire Regiment, Territorial Army.
- Regimental Quartermaster Sergeant William George Hankin, The Queen's Royal Regiment (West Surrey).
- Lieutenant (temporary Captain) Arthur Richard Hanmer, The Gloucestershire Regiment.
- Lieutenant William Hannah, West Lothian Home Guard.
- Warrant Officer Class I, Robert Hannan, Royal Electrical and Mechanical Engineers.
- Regimental Quartermaster Sergeant Bernard Hanson, Royal Engineers.
- Lieutenant (acting Captain) (Senior Assistant Surgeon) Eric Rudolph Hill, Indian Army Medical Corps.
- Major (Quartermaster) Peter Norman Hitchman, The Black Watch (Royal Highland Regiment).
- Captain (temporary Major) Thomas Edwin Hodgson, General List.
- Major (Quartermaster) John Samuel Hoppin, Royal Army Service Corps.
- Miss Winifred Grace Houlding, Sister, Territorial Army Nursing Service.
- Captain Henry Maurice Howell, Officers Training Corps.
- Regimental Sergeant-Major Albert Henry Ingram, The Royal Welch Fusiliers.
- Lieutenant (temporary Captain) (Deputy Commissary) James Ingram, Indian Army Ordnance Corps.
- Captain (temporary Major) James Moffatt Ireland, Royal Army Ordnance Corps.
- Lieutenant (temporary Captain) (Adjutant) George Douglas Izzett, Royal Army Ordnance Corps.
- Major Jaswant Parmar, Indian States Forces.
- Lieutenant (temporary Captain) Philip Sidney Keen, The Devonshire Regiment.
- Captain Brevet Major (temporary Major) Richard Barrett Talbot Kelly, M.C., Royal Artillery.
- Major (Mrs.) Ino Kennedy, A.R.R.C., Southern Rhodesia Women's Auxiliary Military Service.
- Lieutenant (temporary Captain) John Killey, The Devonshire Regiment.
- Captain (temporary Major) Robert Gordon Kitchen, Royal Corps of Signals.
- Major (Quartermaster) Timothy Lane, T.D., The Manchester Regiment, Territorial Army.
- Regimental Quartermaster Sergeant William Henry Lavers, D.C.M., Grenadier Guards.
- Regimental Sergeant-Major Edmund Philip Lempriere, Royal Tank Regiment, Royal Armoured Corps.
- Major (Quartermaster) Harold Lindsay,, M.M., The King's Own Royal Regiment (Lancaster).
- Lieutenant (temporary Captain) Hugh Norton Lister, Royal Artillery.
- Captain (temporary Major) Ronald Selby Little, Royal Artillery.
- Captain (temporary Major) Douglas Plenderleath Lithgow, 1st The Royal Dragoons, Royal Armoured Corps.
- Lieutenant (temporary Captain) Eric Horton London, Royal Artillery.
- Captain (temporary Major) Duncan MacGregor, The Argyll and Sutherland Highlanders (Princess Louise's).
- Major Alexander Renshaw MacKay, Fifeshire Home Guard.
- Lieutenant (acting Captain) Ian Louis Egerton Macmillan, The Gordon Highlanders.
- Lieutenant-Colonel (Assistant Paymaster) James Michael Macnamara, Royal Army Pay Corps.
- Lieutenant (Quartermaster) Alfred Charles Mogridge, Royal Artillery.
- Captain (temporary Major) Majeed Malik, Indian Army.
- Junior Commander Marion Charlotte Marling, Auxiliary Territorial Service.
- Captain (Quartermaster) Charles King Mason, Royal Artillery.
- Sub-Conductor (temporary Conductor) Frederick Victor Mason, Indian Army Corps of Clerks.
- Captain Robert Claude Matthews, Royal Indian Army Service Corps.
- Captain (temporary Major) Ernest Frederick Tobin Maunsell, Royal Engineers.
- Chaplain to the Forces 4th Class (temporary Chaplain to the Forces 3rd Class) The Reverend Richard John Forrester Mayston, Royal Army Chaplains Department.
- Major Herbert Joseph McCaffery, Royal Engineers.
- Captain (temporary Major) Charles Patrick Home McCall) Royal Army Ordnance Corps.
- Captain (temporary Major) (local Lieutenant-Colonel) Henderson McDiarmid, Royal Engineers.
- Company Sergeant-Major Donald McKay, Royal Engineers.
- Captain (temporary Major) John Morris McKee, The Royal Inniskilling Fusiliers.
- Major Stanley Wayman Milburn, Royal Artillery, Territorial Army.
- Lieutenant (Ouartermaster) Charles Arthur Milner, Royal Army Medical Corps.
- Battery Sergeant-Major (acting Warrant Officer Class l) James McKenna Mitchell, Royal Artillery.
- Lieutenant (temporary Captain) Mohammed Hafiz, Indian Army.
- Chaplain to the Forces 4th Class the Reverend William Wilson Morrell, Royal Army Chaplain's Department.
- Lieutenant (temporary Captain) Henry Whittaker Morton, Royal Engineers.
- Subadar Muhammad Sadiq, 1st Punjab Regiment, Indian Army.
- Captain John James Newbury, Glamorgan Home Guard.
- Captain (Brevet Major) (temporary Major) Reginald Charles Norton, The King's Shropshire Light Infantry.
- Captain (Quartermaster) Frederick William Oakes, Royal Corps of Signals.
- Regimental Sergeant-Major Charles William Douglas O'Gorman, Royal Artillery.
- Captain (Assistant Paymaster) (Temporary Major, Staff Paymaster 2nd Class) William Frederick Oram, Royal Army Pay Corps.
- Honorary Captain William Edward Corbett Owen, E. D., Southern Rhodesia, Territorial Forces.
- Major Frederick Arthur Paling, Southern Rhodesia Forces.
- Lieutenant (temporary Captain) John Blackall Palmer, 13th Frontier Force Rifles, Indian Army.
- Captain (temporary Major) William Gregg Parker, B.Sc., Royal Engineers.
- Captain (temporary Major) Bernard Lancelot Pavey, The Bedfordshire & Hertfordshire Regiment.
- Captain Andrew James Paviour, General List.
- Lieutenant (temporary Captain) the Honourable Peter George Penny, Royal Artillery.
- Regimental Sergeant-Major Petero, East African Forces.
- Captain Harry Clement Pollock, Royal Engineers.
- Captain Francis Leslie Potter, Royal Army Medical Corps.
- Captain (Assistant Paymaster) (temporary Major, Staff Paymaster 2nd Class) William Alfred Potter, Royal Army Pay Corps.
- Captain (temporary Major) Harry Allan Ross Powell, Royal Artillery.
- Instructor Sergeant-Major Patrick Power, Army Physical Training Corps.
- Major (Quartermaster) William England Price, M.C., D.C.M., The East Lancashire Regiment.
- Major (Quartermaster) Charles . George Pyemont, T.D., Royal Artillery.
- Captain (temporary Major) Hugh John Reginald Joseph Radcliffe, Royal Artillery.
- Captain (temporary Major) Philip Eugene Gerard Rathbone, Royal Indian Army Service Corps.
- Subadar Major (Honorary Lieutenant) Ram Sing Rawat, Sardar Bahadur, 18th Royal Garkwal Rifles, Indian Army.
- Regimental Sergeant-Major Sidney James George Regler, Royal Tank Regiment, Royal Armoured Corps.
- Lieutenant Claude Kenneth Revis, Royal Engineers.
- Captain (temporary Major) Alfred James Patrick Ritchie, The North Staffordshire Regiment (The Prince of Wales's).
- Lieutenant (Quartermaster) (temporary Captain) Arthur Roe, Royal Army Service Corps.
- Captain (temporary Major) Daniel Rogers, Royal Artillery.
- Major Augustus Hugh Rootes, 15th Punjab Regiment, Indian Army.
- Captain (temporary Major) Charles Martin Row, Royal Army Medical Corps.
- Staff Quartermaster-Sergeant (acting Staff Sergeant-Major) Geoffrey Lewin Rowe, Royal Army Service Corps.
- Lieutenant Harry Robinson Rowntree, The East Lancashire Regiment.
- Lieutenant (temporary Captain) Frederick Rush, Royal Army Service Corps. Captain Edwin Hill Ryley, General List.
- Captain (temporary Major) Noel Graham Salvesen, Intelligence Corps.
- Major (Quartermaster) Harry Scaife, Royal Engineers.
- Lieutenant (temporary Captain) Felix Xavier Schreyeck, Army Catering Corps.
- Lieutenant (temporary Captain) Arthur Walker Semple, Intelligence Corps.
- Captain (temporary Major) (Commissary) John Charles Sharpe, Indian Army Ordnance Corps.
- Major Donald Archibald Pollock Shields, Worcestershire Home Guard.
- Captain William Henry Simmonds, Gloucestershire Home Guard.
- Captain (temporary Major) Dudley Cautley Stewart-Smith, Extra Regimentally Employed List.
- Lieutenant (temporary Captain) Edward Smith, The Worcestershire Regiment.
- Captain (Quartermaster) Robert Edwin Somes, Coldstream Guards.
- Kaid Gregory Soultanian, Trans-Jordan Frontier Force.
- Captain Reginald Winfrid Stephenson, The Wiltshire Regiment (Duke' of Edinburgh's).
- Captain (temporary Major) Leslie Alfred Emile Stevens, Royal Engineers.
- Junior Commander (temporary Senior Commander) Mary Agatha Storey, Auxiliary Territorial Service.
- Major John Clement Tabor, T.D., Gloucestershire Home Guard.
- Lieutenant (temporary Captain) Herbert Oswald Taylor, Indian Army,
- Staff Sergeant-Major William Leonard Taylor, The King's African Rifles.
- Lieutenant Albert Edward Thompson, The South Staffordshire Regiment.
- Captain (temporary Major) John Bernard Thompson, Royal Army Service Corps.
- Captain Tikka Surindar Sind Bedi, Indian Army.
- Captain (temporary Major) (Quartermaster) George Charles Tompsett, General List.
- Regimental Sergeant-Major Saidu Turay, Sierra Leone Regiment, West African Frontier Force.
- Squadron-Sergeant-Major John Verge, 10th Royal Hussars (Prince of Wales's Own).
- Staff Sergeant-Major Dungey Verran, Royal Army Service Corps.
- Major (Quartermaster) Benjamin Victor James Vigrass, Reconnaissance Corps.
- Major Aubrey Clifford Wadsworth, Army Cadet Force.
- Regimental Quartermaster Sergeant Fred Walker, The King's Own Yorkshire Light Infantry.
- Lieutenant (temporary Captain) Stanley Eric Walker, Royal Artillery.
- Second-Lieutenant John Walsh, Hampshire Home Guard.
- Major Andrew Benjamin Way, British Guiana Home Guard.
- Major (temporary Lieutenant-Colonel) Gilbert Henry Way, Royal Army Ordnance Corps.
- Major Donald Clarence Whitaker, Dorsetshire Home Guard.
- Captain (temporary Major) Stanley Charles White, The Royal Fusiliers (City of London Regiment).
- Major John Willatt, M.C., M.A., Army Educational Corps.
- Company Sergeant-Major Ethel Williams, Auxiliary Territorial Service.
- Captain (temporary Major) (Assistant Ordnance Mechanical Engineer) Norman David Stuart Williams, Indian Electrical and Mechanical Engineers.
- Captain (local Major) Fred Wood, Jamaica Home Guard.
- Captain (Quartermaster) Ernest James Woods, Royal Artillery.
- Captain Edward John Wortley, M.M., Lancashire Home Guard.
- Captain (temporary Major) Frank Rob Wray, Royal Engineers.
- Lieutenant (local Captain) Arthur William. Wright, Indian Army.
- Warrant Officer Class Il John Wright, The Middlesex Regiment (Duke of Cambridge's Own).
- Lieutenant-Colonel Frank Zealley, Army Cadet Force.
- Squadron Leader John Grimwood Earl, Royal Air Force.
- Squadron Leader John Edward Marzorati, Southern Rhodesian Air Force and Royal Air Force Volunteer Reserve.
- Acting Squadron Leader Bertie George Starr Burleigh, Royal Air Force Volunteer Reserve.
- Acting Squadron Leader Donald Edward Gibbs, Royal Air Force.
- Acting Squadron Leader Archibald Harry Leslie Pearce, Royal Air Force.
- The Reverend Herbert Elymor Dickson Ashford, Royal Canadian Air Force.
- Flight Lieutenant (now Acting Squadron Leader) Charles Wilfred Crimmin, Royal Air Force.
- Flight Lieutenant (now Acting Squadron Leader) Eric Vincent Cunliffe, Royal Air Force Volunteer Reserve.
- Flight Lieutenant Arthur Clarke Dunn, Royal Air Force Volunteer Reserve.
- Flight Lieutenant Eric Leonard Fenton, Auxiliary Air Force.
- Flight Lieutenant Richard Aylmer Frost, Royal Air Force Volunteer Reserve.
- Flight Lieutenant William Charles Graham, Royal Air Force Volunteer Reserve.
- Flight Lieutenant George Anderton Grant, Royal Australian Air Force.
- Flight Lieutenant Henry William Hughes, Royal Air Force.
- Flight Lieutenant Reginald Nelson Payne, Royal Air Force.
- Flight Lieutenant John Wyndham Pope-Hennessey, Reserve of Air Force Officers.
- Flight Lieutenant Hilaire Roberge, Royal Canadian Air Force.
- Flight Lieutenant Victor Rodgers, Royal Air Force Volunteer Reserve.
- Flight Lieutenant Ronald Leslie Rossiter, Royal Air Force Volunteer Reserve.
- Flight Lieutenant Thomas Walter Sherratt, Royal Air Force Volunteer Reserve.
- Flight Lieutenant Herbert George Sparks, Royal Air Force.
- Flight Lieutenant (now Acting Squadron Leader) Graham Russell Swanwick, Royal Air Force Volunteer Reserve.
- Flight Lieutenant Ronald George Wilsdon, Royal Air Force Volunteer Reserve.
- Flight Lieutenant, (now Acting Squadron Leader) Frederick William Worley, Royal Air Force.
- Acting Flight Lieutenant William Billington, Royal Air Force Volunteer Reserve.
- Acting Flight Lieutenant (now Acting Squadron Leader) Russell Mackie Bragg, Royal Canadian Air Force.
- Acting Flight Lieutenant Philip Henry Burton, Royal Air Force Volunteer Reserve.
- Acting Flight Lieutenant joseph Montague Caudle, Royal Air Force.
- Acting Flight Lieutenant Arthur Henry Chapman, Royal Air Force Volunteer Reserve.
- Acting Flight Lieutenant Eric Harvey Dickens, Royal Air Force Volunteer Reserve. Acting Flight Lieutenant Dudley Jack Ellery, Royal Air Force.
- Acting Flight Lieutenant (now Acting Squadron Leader) Bert Flannery, Royal Air Force.
- Acting Flight Lieutenant Alexander John Forsyth, Royal Canadian Air Force.
- Acting Flight Lieutenant Charles Robert Gooding, Royal Air Force Volunteer Reserve.
- Acting Flight Lieutenant John Hinchliffe Gould, Royal Air Force Volunteer Reserve.
- Acting Flight Lieutenant Leslie John Hickman, Royal Air Force Volunteer Reserve.
- Acting Flight Lieutenant Douglas Hughes, Royal Air Force Volunteer Reserve. Acting Flight Lieutenant George Henry Lambert, Royal Air Force.
- Acting Flight Lieutenant Percival Lamey, Royal Air Force.
- Acting Flight Lieutenant George Edwin Ridd, Royal Air Force.
- Acting Flight Lieutenant Cecil Raymond Shepherd, Royal Air Force.
- Acting Flight Lieutenant Leslie James Snape, Royal Air Force Volunteer Reserve.
- Acting Flight Lieutenant (now Acting Squadron Leader) David Arnold Solomon, Royal Air Force Volunteer Reserve.
- Acting Flight Lieutenant Robert Dudley King Tallowin, Royal Air Force Volunteer Reserve.
- Acting Flight Lieutenant William Thomas Wakeham, Royal Air Force.
- Acting Flight Lieutenant William Wrightson, Royal Air Force Volunteer Reserve.
- Flying Officer Ernest Trevor Corin Durrant, Royal Air Force Volunteer Reserve.
- Flying Officer Edward William Freeman, Royal Air Force Volunteer Reserve.
- Flying Officer Charles Frederick Gibson, Royal Air Force Volunteer Reserve.
- Flying Officer Ralph Edwin Newman, Royal Air Force Volunteer Reserve.
- Flying Officer David Herbert Slater, Royal Air Force Volunteer Reserve.
- Warrant Officer George Wilson Wood Baker, Royal Air Force.
- Warrant Officer Alfred James Barlow, Royal Air Force Volunteer Reserve.
- Warrant Officer Henry Keith Heller, Royal Australian Air Force.
- Warrant Officer James McCracken Mackie, Royal Air Force.
- Warrant Officer Hugh Lewis Parry, Royal Air Force.
- Warrant Officer Lewis John Peach, Royal Air Force.
- Warrant Officer Edward Gibson Rees, Royal Air Force.
- Warrant Officer Joseph Vernon Thompson, Royal Air Force.
- Warrant Officer Hugh Rodney Watkins, Royal Air Force.
- Warrant Officer Jack Whinnett, Royal Air Force.
- Warrant Officer Joseph Wood, Royal Air Force.
- Acting Warrant Officer Ernest Armstrong, Royal Air Force.
- Acting Warrant Officer William Orice Gilbert, Royal Air Force.
- Acting Warrant Officer Norman Stuart Robinson, Royal Air Force.
- Flight Officer Audrey Louie Rundle, Women's Auxiliary Air Force.
- Flight Officer Margaret Evelyn Kirkham Wherry, Women's Auxiliary Air Force.
- Acting Flight Officer Irene Rose Cryer, Women's Auxiliary Air Force.

Australia:

- Lieutenant Commander Ronald Alexander Denovan, R.A.N.V.R.
- Lieutenant John Charles Elley, Royal Australian Navy.
- Captain James Burnett Carmody, Australian Military Forces.
- Lieutenant (temporary Captain) Stanley Robert Irving Clark, Australian Military Forces.
- Lieutenant John Godfrey Saxton, Australian Military Forces.
- Squadron Leader Alexander Charles Alfred McBride, Royal Australian Air Force.
- Flight Lieutenant William Joseph Symons, Royal Australian Air Force.
- Warrant Officer George Green, Royal Australian Air Force.

New Zealand:

- Captain George Bartrum Baker, D.C.M., M.M., New Zealand Military Forces.
- Captain Arthur Douglas Cooper, New Zealand Territorial Forces.
- Captain James Paumea Ferris, New Zealand Military Forces.
- Captain and Quartermaster James Green Milne, New Zealand Military Forces.
- Warrant Officer Class I Stuart Waters Richardson, New Zealand Military Forces.
- Second Lieutenant Reginald Augustus Thomas, New Zealand Military Forces.
- Captain Keith Owen Tunnicliffe, New Zealand Military Forces.
- Warrant Officer John Edward Keating McConnell, Royal New Zealand Air Force.

Civil Division

- Robert Douglas, Esq., a British subject resident in Turkey.
- Winifred Amy, Mrs. Goodbody, a British subject resident in the Argentine Republic.
- Reginald Arthur Morrison Hughman, Esq., British Vice-Consul at Pernambuco.
- Albert James Johnson, Esq., Archivist at His Majesty's Legation at Caracas.
- Thomas Joseph McGurk, Esq., Clerical Officer at His Majesty's Embassy at Cairo.
- Miss Tercia Decima Meek, a British subject resident in Egypt.
- Joseph Todd Mulvenny, Esq., British Vice-Consul at Baltimore.
- William Percy Taylor Nurse, Esq., British Vice-Consul at New Orleans.
- Miss Kathleen Mary Potts, Shorthand-typist at His Majesty's Embassy at Cairo.
- Cyril Jackson Rogers, Esq., Employed at His Majesty's Consulate-General at Loanda.
- Miss Gladys Rebecca Winifred Routh, Clerk at His Majesty's Consulate-General at Smyrna.
- Joseph David Salamah, Esq., Chief Translator at His Majesty's Embassy at Bagdad.
- John Henry Toovey, Esq., Superintendent of the Central Prison at Port Sudan.
- Maud, Mrs. Whitton, a British subject resident in the Argentine Republic.
- Raymond Charles Wilkins, Esq., a British subject resident in Paraguay.
- Henry Charles Arnold, Esq., Manager of the Government Agricultural Experimental Station at Salisbury, Southern Rhodesia.
- James Arthur Banks, Esq., Vice-Chairman, West of Scotland Branch, Empire Societies' War Hospitality Committee.
- Ernest Warren Blackbeard, Esq., a trader in Serowe, Bechuanaland Protectorate. For public services.
- Anthony Drinkwater Chataway, Esq., Civil Commissioner and Magistrate, Salisbury, Southern Rhodesia.
- Frank Cox, Esq., an officer of the Southern Rhodesia Civil Service attached to the Office of the High Commissioner for Southern Rhodesia in London.
- Joseph Michael Curran, Esq., lately Technical Officer, Newfoundland Oversea Forestry Unit.
- Miss Margaret Rice Davies. For work in connection with the Newfoundland Forces oversea.
- Joyce Meeres, Mrs. Fry. For services in connection with the Dominion and Allied Services' Hospitality Scheme.
- Cornelius Ewen MacLean Greenfield, Esq., Bookkeeper to the Treasury, Southern Rhodesia.
- Miss Frances Lindsay. For services in the care of torpedoed survivors landed at St. John's, Newfoundland.
- David Jaines Masterton Mackenzie, Esq., M.B., Ch.B.(Edin.), Acting Principal Medical Officer, Bechuanaland Protectorate.
- Miss Daisy Muriel Millhouse, Matron of the Home for Incurables, State of South Australia.
- Richard Hugh de Camborne Paynter, Esq., Superintendent, British South Africa Police Reserve, Officer Commanding the Police Reserve Division at Salisbury, Southern Rhodesia.
- The Honourable Leslie Arthur Procter, Member of the Legislative Council, and President of the Municipal Association, State of Tasmania.
- John Rankin, Esq., Station Master, Glasgow Central Station. For services in connection with the movement of oversea troops.
- Norman Frederick Shillingford, Esq., Superintendent, British South Africa Police Reserve, Officer Commanding the Police Reserve Division at Bulawayo, Southern Rhodesia.
- Gladys Mary, Mrs. Woollcombe. For services in connection with hospitality to oversea troops in Aldershot and Glasgow.
- Miss Lilian Godfreida Lutter, Superintendent, American Baptist Mission, Morton Lane Girls' School and Normal School, Moulmein, Burma.
- Frederick William Thompson Bodeker, Esq., Extra Assistant Conservator, Forest Department.
- Oyinkan Morunke, Mrs. Abayomi. For social welfare work in Nigeria.
- Clement Anderson Akrofi, Esq. For services to education in the Gold Coast.
- Eric Hutton Allinson, Esq., Sleeping Sickness Surveyor, Tanganyika Territory.
- Henry John Bolsom, Esq., Chief Storekeeper, Tanganyika Territory Railways.
- The Very Reverend Archpriest Monsignor Emmanuel Brincat. For public services in Malta.
- John Lewis Chapman, Esq., Chief Sanitary Inspector, Health Department, St. Vincent.
- Vera, Mrs. Crompton, President of the Fiji Red Cross and War Appeals Committee.
- Herbert Henderson Fraser, Esq., Private Secretary to the Governor of the Leeward Islands.
- Violet Grace Lilian, Mrs. Gladwell. For services at the Red Cross Depot, Nairobi, Kenya.
- Francis Raban Johnson, Esq., M.Sc., F.I.C., Colonial Chemical Service, Government Chemist, Gold Coast.
- Flora Annie, Mrs. Jones. For social welfare services in Nigeria.
- Glyn Smallwood Jones, Esq., Colonial Administrative Service, District Officer, Northern Rhodesia.
- Walter Stanley Jones, Esq. For public services in the Turks Islands.
- John Kitching, Esq., Divisional Irrigation Engineer, Ceylon.
- George Angel Douglas Lavarello, Esq., Office Superintendent, Colonial Secretariat, Gibraltar.
- Miss Eliza Ann McGill, Colonial Nursing Service, Lady Superintendent of Nurses, Uganda.
- Doris Mary Dean, Mrs. Macqueen, Private Secretary to the Chief Secretary, Palestine.
- Paul Joseph Mercieca, Esq., Engineer, Demolition and Clearance Department, Malta.
- Mary, Mrs. Modera. For social welfare services in Kenya.
- Oscar Paris, Esq., Superintendent of Public Gardens, Malta.
- Mohamed Ali Rana, Esq., M.R.C.S., L.R.C.P. For public services in Kenya.
- Company Sergeant-Major Leonard Sharpe, Senior Instructor and Superintendent, Air Raid Precautions Department, Malta. (Seconded from the Rifle Brigade.)
- Alastair Malcolm Smith, Esq., Pilot, Harbours Department, Kenya and Uganda Railways and Harbours Administration.
- Elizabeth Saltenstall, Mrs. Wright. For social welfare services in Ceylon.
- Captain Seraphim Salvatore Xuereb, Controller of Labour, Malta.

Honorary:

- Muhammudu, Emir of Fika, Nigeria.
- Sheikh Qaddal Said Qaddal, Educational Assistant to the Resident Adviser, Mukalla, Aden Protectorate.
- Samuel Julian Hadawi, Esq., Land Officer, Palestine.
- Gad Levinson, Esq., Inspector, Posts and Telegraphs Department, Palestine.
- Juda Mazow Tocatly, Esq. For public services in Palestine.
- Marjory Mackellar, Mrs. Prendergast (wife of Colonel M. H. Prendergast, D.S.O., M.V.O., Assistant Adjutant-General, General Headquarters, India), Red Cross Commissioner's Office, Simla.
- Khan Bahadur Saiyid Ali Zamin, Vice-President, Council of Administration and Chief Secretary, Benares State.
- Ratnakar Narayan Bhaindarkar, Esq., M.B., B.S., A.R.P. Divisional Warden, Dadar West Division, Bombay.
- Padam Chand Bhandari, Esq., Secretary, Municipal Committee, Amritsar, and Communications Officer, Air Raid Precautions, Amritsar, Punjab.
- Khan Bahadur Byramji Rustomji Bhaya, Honorary Additional District Magistrate and Judge, Mhow, Central India.
- Wilton James Bolst, Esq., Bullion Registrar of His Majesty's Mint, Calcutta.
- Ian Peter MacGillivray Cargill, Esq., Indian Civil Service, lately Deputy Administrator, Martial Law, Sind.
- Abani Bhusan Chatterjee, Esq., Indian Civil Service, Provincial Organiser, National War Front, Bengal.
- Herbert Broomfield Colledge, Esq., Lieutenant-Commissioner, Territorial Commander of Western India, The Salvation Army, Bombay.
- Captain John Richard Cotton, Indian Political Service, Under-Secretary to the Resident at Hyderabad.
- James Thomas Cox, Esq., Officer-in-Charge, Military Farms Group, Kirkee.
- Emile Eugene DeSouza, Esq., Deputy field Controller of Military Accounts.
- Herbert Reginald Lee Emery, Esq., Honorary Assistant Traffic Superintendent and Station Superintendent, Moghalserai.
- Lionel Edgar Farrant, Esq., Deputy Superintendent of Police, Finger Print Bureau, Allahabad, United Provinces.
- Edward Few, Esq., Member, Punjab Legislative Assembly, Lahore, Punjab.
- Patrick Francis Finnigan, Esq., Assistant Commercial Officer, North-Western Railway, Karachi.
- Captain Leslie Alfred Charles Fry, Indian Political Service, Under Secretary to the Government of India in the External Affairs Department.
- Gariesh Pershad, Esq., Insurance Manager, Govan Brothers, Limited, New Delhi.
- Archibald Whitlock Richard Gill, Esq., Magistrate and Collector, Shahjahanpur, United Provinces.
- Thakur Gopal Singh, of Badnore, Udaipur (Mewar) State, Rajputana.
- Pankaj Kumar Gupta, Esq., Indian Football Association, Bengal.
- Major James Gold, I.E., Works Manager, Engineering Workshops, Madras & Southern Mahratta Railway, Arkonam.
- Lieutenant-Colonel Haider Khan, Professor of Chemistry, Aligarh Muslim University and Officer Commanding, 2nd Battalion (United Provinces), U.T.C., I.T.F., United Provinces.
- Major Patrick John Keen, Indian Political Ser vice, lately Assistant Director in the Quetta Branch of the Intelligence Bureau, Government of India.
- Khan Bahadur Seth Kikabhai, General Merchant and Honorary Magistrate, Raipur, Central Provinces and Berar.
- Archibald Solomon Kyte, Esq., Assistant Collector of Salt Revenue, Kharaghoda.
- Elwyn Byron Lewis, Esq., Chief Mining Engineer, Salt Range Division, Central Excises and Salt Department, North-Western India.
- Dugald McAlpine, Esq., Resident Engineer, Oudh and Tirhut Railway, Mansi.
- Thomas McIntyre, Esq., Officiating Deputy Chief Engineer, Bridges, Bengal and Assam Railway, Calcutta.
- George Elphinstone Miller, Esq., Zamindar and Honorary Magistrate, Digha, Patna District, Bihar.
- Muhammad Abdul Hamid Khan, Esq., Assistant Postmaster-General, Madras Circle, Madras.
- Duraiswami Narayanamurti, Esq., A.I.C., F.Inst.P., Wood Preservation Officer, Forest Research Institute.
- Frank Noble, Esq., Superintendent, Dacca Central Jail, Bengal.
- Alfred Henry Nunn, Esq., Officer-in-Charge, A.R.P. Rescue Service, Calcutta, Bengal.
- Rai Bahadur Pandit Lachhmi Dat Pande, Advocate and President, Bar Association, Almora, United Provinces.
- Jagat Ram Pandit, Esq., Barrister-at-Law, Gujrat, Punjab.
- David James Keese Plumley, Esq., State Engineer, Bastar, Eastern States.
- Reginald Kaye Polwhele, Esq., District Traffic Superintendent, Oudh and Tirhut Railway, Sonepore.
- Reginald James Pringle, Esq., Indian Civil Service, Deputy Secretary to the Government of India in the Department of Commerce.
- Khan Sahib Shaikh Nawab Ali Qureshi, Assistant Inspector-General of Prisons, Punjab,
- Raghunath Pershad, Esq., Assistant Secretary, Office of the Chief Administrative Officer, War Department, Government of India.
- Honorary Captain Sardar Bahadur Rattan Chand, O.B.I., Zaildar, Rangar, Tahsil Hamirpur, Kangra District, Punjab,
- James Scott, Esq., Manager, Khardah Jute Mills, Titagarh, 24-Parganas, Bengal.
- Sri Manmatha Kumar Seal, Honorary Magistrate, Jaipur, Cuttack District, Orissa.
- Lieutenant Muhammad Sharif Khan, 10th Baluch Regiment, Indian Army, attached Tochi Scouts, North Waziristan, North-West Frontier Province.
- William Shaw, Esq., Deputy Commissioner, Garo Hills, Assam.
- Khan Bahadur Sher Jan Khan, Malik, Bakka Khel Wazir Tribe, Bannu, North-west Frontier Province.
- George William Tayler, Officer Supervisor, Adjutant-General's Branch, General Headquarters, India.
- Roland Veale, Esq., Manager, Block Signal Workshops, Howrah.
- Arthur Cecil Warren, Esq., Engineer Officer, No. 2 Elementary Flying Training School, Royal Air Force, India.
- The Reverend Edward Wheeler, Missionary, Jeypur, Bhagalpur District, Bihar.
- Major Cyril Charles Farmer Wright, Officer Commanding No. 3 (Special) Auxiliary Pioneer Battalion, and lately Superintendent, Borstal School, Palamcottah Tinnevelly District, Madras.
- Thomas Clarence Wynne, Esq., Assistant Traffic Manager, Nagpur Division, Great Indian Peninsula Railway.
- Sidney John Farmer, Esq., Controller of Military Accounts, Burma.
- Robert Watson, Esq., Indian Agricultural Service, Deputy Director of Agriculture, Burma.
- Sidney John Farmer, Esq., Controller of Military Accounts, Burma.
- Robert Watson, Esq., Indian Agricultural Service, Deputy Director of Agriculture, Burma.
- Robert Arthur Bertram, Esq., M.M., Colliery Engineer, Nigeria.
- George Henry Braithwaite, Esq., Government Printer, Kenya.
- Percy Joe Camozzi, Esq. For public services in Malta.
- Herbert William Ralph Chandler, Esq., M.C., E.D., Colonial Customs Service, Comptroller of Customs, Gold Coast.
- Peter Paul Debono, Esq., M.D., F.R.C.S., Professor of Surgery, Malta University.
- Arthur Emlyn, Esq. For public services in Trinidad.
- James Robbie Farquharson, Esq., A.M.Inst.C.E., Chief Engineer, Tanganyika Territory Railways.
- Arthur Frederick Giles, Esq., Colonial Police Service, Assistant Inspector-General of Police, Palestine.
- Joseph Richard Gregory. Esq., M.D., Director, Kenya Branch, British Red Cross Society.
- Magnus Halcrow, Esq., Colonial Agricultural Service, Agricultural Officer, St. Helena.
- Frederick George Harcourt, Esq., M.B.E., Assistant Administrator, Antigua, Leeward Islands.
- Joseph Paul Henri, Esq., Colonial Education Service, Superintendent of Schools, Mauritius.
- Harold Robert Howie, Esq., Commissioner of Income Tax and Stamp Duties, Jamaica.
- Francis Ernest Irving, Esq., Colonial Customs Service, Senior Customs Officer, Zanzibar.
- David Willoughby Saunders-Jones, Esq., Colonial Administrative Service, Assistant Chief Secretary, Nyasaland.
- John Smith Moffat, Esq., M.B.E., Colonial Administrative Service, District Commissioner, Northern Rhodesia.
- Unwin Jackson Moffat, Esq., Colonial Agricultural Service, Senior Agricultural Officer, Northern Rhodesia.
- Geoffrey Walter Nye, Esq., Colonial Agricultural Service, Deputy Director of Agriculture, Uganda.
- Claude Richard Rowlands, Esq., M.M., Colonial Postal Service, Postmaster-General, Sierra Leone.
- Harold Edward Skeete, Esq., M.D., C.M. For public services in Barbados.
- Leonard Anthony Paul Slinger, Esq., M.B., B.Ch., Colonial Medical Service, Resident Surgeon, Victoria Hospital, St. Lucia.
- Reginald Victor Stone, Esq. For public services in the Tanganyika Territory.
- The Honourable Mabel Strickland. For public services in Malta.
- Commander George William Trinick, R.D., R.N.R., Principal Marine Officer, Nigeria.
- Colonel Justin Gerhard Vandersmagt, V.D., Chief Air Raid Warden and Officer-in-Charge, Wardens' Service, Ceylon.

== Kaisar-i-Hind Gold Medal for public services in India ==
- Muriel Hearson, Lady Twynam (wife of Sir Henry Twynam, K.C.S.I., C.I.E., Governor of the Central Provinces and Berar).
- Grace Steele, Lady Glancy (wife of Sir Bertrand Glancy, K.C.S.I., K.C.I.E., Governor of the Punjab).
- Heather, Mrs. Bourne (wife of Mr. F. C. Bourne, C.I.E., I.C.S., Chief Secretary to Government), Punjab.
- Miss Dora Chadwick, Principal Matron, Surgeon-General's Office, Madras.
- Miss Jean Murray Orkney, M.B., Ch.B., D.P.H., Women's Medical Service, Director, Maternity and Child Welfare Bureau, Indian Red Cross Society, New Delhi.
- Sir Hugh Clayton, C.I.E., Indian Civil service (retired), Chairman, The Hospitality Committee for British and Indian Soldiers, Sailors and Airmen, Bombay.
- Lieutenant-Colonel Basil Franklin Eminson, Indian Medical Service (retired), Civil Surgeon, Karachi, Sind.
- Major Reginald Arthur Haythornthwaite, Indian Medical Service, Civil Surgeon, Khasi and Jantia Hills, Assam.
- John Lowe, Esq., M.D., M.B., Ch.B., Coordinator of Research, School of Tropical Medicine, Calcutta.

== British Empire Medal (BEM) ==
- Chief Petty Officer Clement Arch (Wool, Dorset).
- Chief Petty Officer Erle Alwin Greglach Boyd.
- Chief Petty Officer Sydney John Burles (Penge).
- Chief Petty Officer Arthur Samuel Mafeking Clatworthy.
- Chief Petty Officer James Fenton (Plymouth).
- Chief Petty Officer (O) Alan Green, S.A.N.F.(V).
- Chief Petty Officer Gordon Wilson Humphrey.
- Chief Petty Officer Arthur Frederick Melton.
- Chief Petty Officer Deep Diver Dick Oliver.
- Chief Petty Officer William Stanley Quy (Mistley, Essex).
- Chief Petty Officer Ernest Alfred Rose (Hove).
- Chief Petty Officer John Robert Sadler (Ipswich).
- Chief Petty Officer William Walter Say (London, Ed).
- Acting Chief Petty Officer Charles Richard Coombs.
- Chief Petty Officer Cecil John Wilmot (Waterlooville, Hampshire).
- Acting Chief Petty Officer George Albert Edward Ettie.
- Chief Yeoman of Signals Lawrie James Brown.
- Chief Yeoman of Signals George Walter Clark.
- Chief Yeoman of Signals Elon Clarke (Paignton).
- Chief Yeoman of Signals Percy Edmund Denis.
- Chief Yeoman of Signals David Miles.
- Chief Yeoman of Signals Bernard Rayner (Portsmouth).
- Chief Engine Room Artificer Charles Francis Dean (St. Keverne, Cornwall).
- Chief Engine Room Artificer Cornelius Randolph Lucas.
- Chief Engine Room Artificer Robert Millard (Bath).
- Chief Engine Room Artificer Cyril James Short (Teignmouth).
- Chief Engine Room Artificer Albert Charles Wakeham (Broadhempston, Devon).
- Chief Engine Room Artificer Thomas Charles Williams.
- Acting Chief Motor Mechanic Reginald Arthur Baker Howgego.
- Acting Chief Motor Mechanic Reginald George Lawless (Hornchurch).
- Chief Stoker Lewis William Acott.
- Chief Stoker George Frederick Adams.
- Chief Stoker Lewis Charles Cloke.
- Chief Stoker John Lifton Holway. Chiaf Stoker Harold James Johnson.
- Chief Stoker William Arthur Savage (Oulton Broad, Lowestoft).
- Chief Stoker Ernest George Snell (South Shields).
- Chief Stoker Henry Willoughby (South Harrow).
- Chief Electrical Artificer Ronald Alfred Billing Monk (Peverel, Plymouth).
- Chief Ordnance Artificer Horace Leslie George Jupp (Southsea).
- Chief Shipwright Frederick George Leach (Chatham).
- Chief Shipwright Francis William Shellock (Chatham).
- Sick Berth Chief Petty Officer James Arthur Gordon.
- Sick Berth Chief Petty Officer Charles William Hicks (Finchley).
- Sick Berth Chief Petty Officer Walter Wilkins Payne (Eastbourne).
- Chief Petty Officer Writer Philip Henniker Edgar Bedingfeld (Twickenham).
- Chief Petty Officer Writer Herbert Edward Downing (Devonport).
- 'Chief Petty Officer Writer Henry Stephen Flynn (Southbourne).
- Chief Petty Officer Writer Walter John Haines.
- Chief Petty Officer Writer Sidney Knight.
- Chief Writer George James Thompson.
- Supply Chief Petty Officer William Henry James Barrett.
- Supply Chief Petty Officer Charles Edward George James (Teignmouth).
- Supply Chief Petty Officer Joseph William George Payne (Gillingham).
- Supply Chief Petty Officer Charles Edward Wright.
- Chief Petty Officer Steward Mark Richard Pinfield.
- Quarter Master Sergeant (First Class) Alfred Webb, Royal Marines (South Hayling Island).
- Colour Sergeant Henry Torrens, Royal. Marines (Southsea).
- Chief Petty Officer Telegraphist George Frederick Oliver Bloyce.
- Chief Petty Officer Telegraphist Gerald Frank Clarke.
- Chief Petty Officer Telegraphist William Edmonds (Plymouth).
- Chief Petty Officer Telegraphist Ebnor William Hall (Portsmouth).
- Chief Petty Officer Telegraphist Albert Horace Mundy (Huxtable).
- Chief Petty Officer Telegraphist Herbert James Nobbs.
- Chief Petty Officer Telegraphist George John Redman.
- Acting Chief Petty Officer Telegraphist Ross William Walton.
- Chief Engine Room Artificer Edward William Burgess.
- Chief Engine Room Artificer Arthur Stanley Cortis (Newcastle-on-Tyne).
- Colour Sergeant William Day, Royal Marines (Gillingham, Kent).
- Temporary Sergeant (Acting Temporary Colour Sergeant) James William Woods, Royal Marines (Orpington, Kent).
- Master-at-Arms Frederick Carfrae (Brighton).
- Master-at-Arms John Angel Chapple (Plymouth).
- Master-at-Arms William Henry Giles (Havant, Hampshire).
- Master-at-Arms Ernest John Howard.
- Master-at-Arms Patrick Fleming Lawler (Southsea).
- Master-at-Arms James William Sellar (Reading).
- Master-at-Arms Valentine George Edward Swallow.
- Master-at-Arms John Ernest Sykes (Plymouth).
- Chief Petty Officer Cook (S) Stanley William Holliday (Peverell, Plymouth).
- Chief Petty Officer Cook (S) Gerald Harris Sherriff (Plymouth).
- Chief Petty Officer Cook (S) James Edwin Walker (Rainham, Kent).
- Chief Petty Officer Cook James Chalder (Portsmouth).
- Chief Petty Officer Cook Ernest Arthur Stark.
- Chief Cook (First Class) Albert Yale (Bebington, Cheshire).
- Chief Wren Cook (O) Margaret Evelyn Dasnieres.
- Chief Engineman Lawrence Crawford Hanson, R.N.P.S. (Fulford, Yorkshire).
- Chief Engineman Charles Robert Swanson (Wick).
- Chief Canteen Manager Michael Thomas Ryan (Cheltenham).
- Engine Room Artificer First Class Charles Henry Featherstone.
- Engine Room Artificer Second Class Clifford Lowndes.
- Engine . Room Artificer Third Class Alfred Bourne.
- Engine Room Artificer Third Class Albert Fisken.
- Electrical Artificer First Class Hugh Gardiner (Lovedene, Hampshire).
- Air Artificer Third Class Ralph John Noad Curtis.
- Shipwright First Class Arthur Stanley Copeman (Londonderry).
- Shipwright Second Class Henry Joseph Diaper (Starcross, Devon).
- Chief Steward Willie Harold Feaver, R.F.A. (Redcar, Yorkshire).
- Petty Officer Deep Diver Frank Harry Clements.
- Petty Officer Jack Davies.
- Petty Officer Kit Herbert Deacon (Burnham-on-Crouch).
- Petty Officer Deep Diver Frederick John Dymond.
- Petty Officer Ivor Heslop (Manchester).
- Petty Officer John Francis Lloyd.
- Petty Officer Jack Douglas Mewett.
- Petty Officer William Robert Palmer.
- Petty Officer Ronald Cedric Roots (Ipswich).
- Petty Officer Albert Edward Sutcliffe (Eland, Yorkshire).
- Petty Officer Leonard George Taber.
- Petty Officer Henry John Ward (Gravesend).
- Yeoman of Signals Frank Eric la Rondie (Edinburgh).
- Yeoman of Signals Frank Charles Bloomfield Turner (Plymouth).
- Petty Officer Telegraphist James William Morley.
- Petty Officer Telegraphist James William Moyce Mursell (Newhaven).
- Petty Officer Telegraphist Arthur George Smith (Purbrook, Hampshire).
- Petty Officer Telegraphist Cyril James Sparkes (Chatham).
- Engine Room Artificer Fourth Class John Clarkson (Warrington).
- Engine Room Artificer Fourth Class Kenneth Lewis Norton (Wellingborough).
- Stoker Petty Officer William Alfred Smith (Hereford).
- Stoker Petty Officer Harry Tilson (Waldron, Sussex).
- Petty Officer Motor Mechanic Thomas Henry Leach (Henton, Middlesex).
- Petty Officer Motor Mechanic Elesdon Basil Rafter (Pietermaritzburg, Natal).
- Petty Officer Motor Mechanic James Reid (Bowerham, Lancashire).
- Petty Officer Air Mechanic (A) Alfred Anthony Frederick Janes.
- Petty Officer Radio Mechanic Robert Smith.
- Petty Officer Writer Edward Charles Leslie Hosking.
- Petty Officer Writer Jasper Henry Streeter (Gosport).
- Regulating Petty Officer William Charles Gibbings, R.A.F.R. Melbourne.
- Petty Officer Cook Jack Moyle.
- Petty Officer Wren Mrs. Annie Knowles (Plymouth).
- Petty Officer Wren Edith Pargeter (Dawley, Shropshire).
- Leading Seaman Martin Thomas Butler, R.N.P.S. (Whitfield, Cumberland).
- Temporary Leading Seaman Leonard Henry Marchant (Brentford).
- Temporary Acting Leading Seaman Jack Bernard Tarbun (Brentwood).
- Leading Telegraphist Louis Littlejohn Roberts.
- Temporary Leading Telegraphist Ernest Wesley Robinson (Barrow-in-Furness).
- Leading Signalman Frederick William Charles Macey (Rochester).
- Leading Stoker Arthur Trivett (Bristol).
- Temporary Acting Leading Stoker Joseph Tonge (Morley, Yorkshire).
- Leading Supply Assistant Leslie Tattersfield.
- Able Seaman John Alexander Proctor.
- Able Seaman Thomas Bertram Wait (Portsmouth).
- Able Seaman Edward Robert Ward (Wellington).
- Able Seaman Jack Williamson.
- Telegraphist Ernest Berry (Harrow Weald).
- Telegraphist Frederick James Gregory.
- Marine (Acting Temporary Corporal) Harold Victor Dudman, Royal Marines (Fulham).
- Seaman Hjalmar Ragnar Bjornsson, R.N.P.S.
- Carpenter Samuel Cox.
- Marine Ernest George Martin Chinnock (Hampstead).
- Nursing Member Grade I Heather Maureen Adair, Voluntary Aid Detachment.
- Sergeant John Edward Adams, Royal Army Service Corps.
- Staff-Sergeant George William Henry Aggett, Royal Army Service Corps.
- Sergeant John Reginald Akerman, M.M., Buckinghamshire Home Guard.
- Sergeant Andrew Allan, Stirlingshire Home Guard.
- Colour Sergeant (Company Quartermaster-Sergeant) the Reverend Charles Orford Allan, B.D., Midlothian Home Guard.
- Sergeant Sydney Ashman, The Somerset Light Infantry (Prince Albert's).
- Sergeant Instructor Frederick Austin, Army Physical Training Corps.
- Private Frank Ayres, Army Air Corps.
- Corporal (Lance-Sergeant) Fred Ball, Royal Armoured Corps.
- Sergeant Edgar Barber, Herefordshire Home Guard.
- Staff Sergeant Thomas Robert Barnard, Royal Army Pay Corps.
- Lance-Sergeant Joyce Nix Barnham, Auxiliary Territorial Service.
- Corporal John Tynan Belger, Pioneer Corps.
- Sergeant Edwin Dick Blizard, Gloucestershire Home Guard.
- Corporal Muriel Ada Borehamp Auxiliary Territorial Service.
- Sergeant Norman Bradbury, Royal Electrical and Mechanical Engineers.
- Company Sergeant Major George William Bridge, Royal Army Ordnance Corps.
- Sergeant (Acting Company Sergeant-Major) David Brown, Kent Home Guard.
- Staff Sergeant Florence Dorothy Browne, Women's Auxiliary Corps (India).
- Corporal (Acting Staff-Sergeant) Reginald Gordon James Bryant, Royal Army Service Corps.
- Corporal Thomas Alfred Buck, Intelligence Corps.
- Colour-Sergeant Charles Leslie Bustard, The Durham Light Infantry.
- Battery Quartermaster-Sergeant Alexander Macdonald Cameron, Royal Artillery.
- Gunner Harold Sidney Carey, Royal Artillery.
- Sergeant Walter Charles William Cartwright, Hertfordshire Home Guard.
- Staff-Sergeant William Herbert Charlton, Royal Electrical and Mechanical Engineers.
- Sergeant Walter Leslie Christian, Manx Home Guard.
- Sergeant John Albert Clovis, Royal Artillery.
- Sergeant (Acting Company Sergeant-Major) Alfred Collens, D.C.M., The East Lancashire Regiment.
- Company Quartermaster-Sergeant John Collins, Fifeshire Home Guard.
- Company Quartermaster-Sergeant (acting Regimental Quartermaster-Sergeant) Reginald Edwin Cox, Royal Corps of Signals.
- Sergeant Harry Cuthbert, The Black Watch (Royal Highland Regiment).
- Sergeant (Acting Company Sergeant-Major) Thomas William Dale, Royal Engineers.
- Sergeant John Edward Davies, The Royal Welch Fusiliers.
- Staff-Sergeant (Mechanist) Frederick Dawber, Royal Engineers.
- Sergeant George Dean, Surrey Home Guard.
- Sergeant Alexander Fraser Drummond, Perthshire Home Guard.
- Lance-Corporal James Duhig, Royal Engineers.
- Private Bernard Vaughan Edwards, Orkney . Home Guard.
- Corporal John William Emons, Pioneer Corps.
- Private Richard Alexander Fawcett, M.C., T.D., Yorkshire Home Guard.
- Company Quartermaster-Sergeant Tom James Whitehouse Fielding, Royal Engineers.
- Private Isabel Freeborough, Auxiliary Territorial Service.
- Sergeant Kathleen Mary Gait, Women's Auxiliary Corps (India).
- Sergeant (Acting Battery Sergeant-Major) Albert Edward Glozier, Royal Artillery.
- Sergeant Alan Goodwin, Royal Army Service Corps.
- Sergeant George Griddle, Surrey Home Guard.
- Corporal Son Ernest Gilbert Hall, The Wiltshire Regiment (Duke of Edinburgh's).
- Staff-Sergeant John Hayes, Royal Engineers.
- Sergeant Denis Heald, Royal Corps of Signals.
- Sergeant Ezequeal Frank Hoare, The Buffs (Royal East Kent Regiment).
- Sergeant (acting Company Quartermaster-Sergeant) George William Hope, Royal Corps of Signals.
- Staff-Sergeant (acting Warrant Officer, Class Il) George Henry Howard, Royal Army Medical Corps.
- Sergeant Lawrence Francis Hyam, Royal Army Service Corps.
- Corporal Walter Lawrence Jacobsson, The Middlesex Regiment (Duke of Cambridge's Own).
- Sergeant Norman Jenkin, Royal Corps of Signals.
- Sergeant Albert George Jones, Monmouthshire Home Guard.
- Sergeant (Acting Warrant Officer Class Il) Tudor Stanley Jones, The Welch Regiment.
- Guardsman (Lance-Corporal) William Jones, Welsh Guards.
- Sergeant Frederick James Jordan, Dorsetshire Home Guard.
- Sergeant Eric John Keel, Sussex Home Guard.
- Staff-Sergeant Percival William Keen, Royal Army Pay Corps.
- Company Quartermaster-Sergeant Edward Kenrick, Carnarvonshire Home Guard.
- Colour-Sergeant (acting Quartermaster-Sergeant) John William Kitchen, The Sherwood Foresters (Nottinghamshire and Derbyshire Regiment).
- Sergeant William Frederick Langdon, The Somerset Light Infantry (Prince Albert's).
- Corporal Frederick George Lansley, Royal Army Medical Corps.
- Sergeant (Pipe-Major) Charles Nicol Law, The Black Watch (Royal Highland Regiment).
- Sergeant William Henry Legg, Royal Engineers.
- Sergeant Alfred George Lestrille, Army Catering Corps, attached Royal Artillery.
- Colour-Sergeant Reginald Adsett Lewis, Oxfordshire Home Guard.
- Sergeant Clarence Lilley, The King's Own Yorkshire Light Infantry.
- Lance-Sergeant Frederick Harold Lynwood, Royal Artillery.
- Sergeant John Thomas Maddock, Royal Tank Regiment, Royal Armoured Corps.
- Sergeant Charles Mallalieu, Lancashire Home Guard.
- Corporal Alexander Albert Reuben Marsh, The Royal Berkshire Regiment (Princess Charlotte of Wales's).
- Sergeant Donald James Martison, Royal Artillery.
- Corporal (Lance-Sergeant) James McDowell, Royal Engineers.
- Corporal Donald McNiven, Royal Armoured Corps.
- Private John McVittie, Lancashire Home Guard.
- Sergeant Tom Carden Moore, Royal Engineers.
- Sergeant William Henry Moore, The Royal Ulster Rifles.
- Colour-Sergeant Bernard Ingram Morris, West Lancashire Home Guard.
- Staff-Sergeant (acting Staff Quartermaster-Sergeant) Edward Arthur Morse, Royal Army Ordnance Corps.
- Sergeant (acting Warrant Officer, Class I) Joseph Mulroy, Royal Engineers.
- Sergeant John Murphy, The West Yorkshire Regiment (The Prince of Wales's Own).
- Sergeant Joseph Neary, The South Lancashire Regiment (The Prince of Wales's Volunteers).
- Corporal (acting Sergeant) Cyril Mafeking Painter, Royal Electrical and Mechanical Engineers.
- Warrant Officer Class Il (Artillery Clerk) (acting Warrant Officer, Class I) Percy James Pardon, Royal Artillery.
- Sergeant Patrick Partridge, Army Air Corps.
- Sergeant Henry Albert Edgar Phillips, Royal Engineers.
- Bombardier Percival Edward Pickering, Royal Artillery.
- Havildar Piru Mall, Corps of Military Police.
- Staff-Sergeant (Artillery Clerk) Stanley Raymond Plant, Royal Artillery.
- Colour-Sergeant Richard Henry Rawnson, The Royal Ulster Rifles.
- Colour-Sergeant (Company Quartermaster-Sergeant) Adam Redpath, The King's Own Scottish Borderers.
- Sergeant Thomas Forrest Rennie, The Argyll and Sutherland Highlanders (Princess Louise's).
- Sergeant-instructor Stanley George Rider, Royal Army Service Corps (since transferred to Army Physical Training Corps).
- Sergeant William Roberts, Denbighshire Home Guard.
- Sergeant Vera Estella Rothwell, Auxiliary Territorial Service.
- Sergeant Thomas Ryan, The King's Shropshire Light Infantry.
- Bombardier (Lance-Sergeant) Frederick Saunders, Royal Artillery.
- Sergeant Douglas Owen Scrace, Kent Home Guard.
- Bombardier (Lance-Sergeant) William Henry Arthur Scudder, Royal Artillery.
- Sergeant Ernest Sharpe, The Leicestershire Regiment.
- Corporal Bernard Arthur Shaw, Derbyshire Home Guard.
- Havildar Shyam Datt, Royal Indian Army Service Corps.
- Sergeant Charles Simpson, Army Air Corps.
- Corporal Ernest Sirrell, Royal Army Medical Corps.
- Colour-Sergeant (Orderly Room Sergeant) John Heywood Slater, Irish Guards.
- Sergeant .William Slater, Royal Artillery.
- Sergeant James Smallman, The Buffs (Royal East Ként Regiment).
- Sergeant (acting Staff-Sergeant) Bert Charles Smith, Royal Army Service Corps.
- Sergeant Thomas McColl Smith, Surrey Home Guard.
- Sergeant Joseph Pyne Spear, Cornwall Home Guard.
- Acting Company Sergeant-Major Barbara Gertrude Spicer, Auxiliary Territorial Service.
- Colour-Sergeant John Summerfield, The Manchester Regiment.
- Sergeant Evelyn Taylor, Auxiliary Territorial Service.
- Acting Corporal William Stafford Taylor, Corps of Military Police.
- Acting Company Sergeant-Major Charles Caswal Fitz-Osborne Thompson, South Caribbean Force.
- Staff-Sergeant James Alfred Tierney, Royal Army Medical Corps.
- Lance-Sergeant Raymond Henry Townsend, The Welch Regiment.
- Staff-Sergeant Patrick Joseph Traynor, Royal Artillery.
- Sergeant Winifred Tullis, Auxiliary Territorial Service.
- Company Quartermaster-Sergeant (Foreman of Signals) Augustine Donald Underwood, Royal Corps of Signals.
- Staff-Sergeant John Whalley, Army Catering Corps, attached The Royal Welch Fusiliers.
- Sapper Douglas Stuart Walden, Royal Engineers.
- Private Frank George Walden, Kent Home Guard.
- Staff-Sergeant Albert Warburton, Royal Army Medical Corps.
- Battery Quartermaster-Sergeant Henry Nathan Ward, Royal Artillery.
- Sergeant (acting Company Sergeant-Major) John West, The North Staffordshire Regiment (The Prince of Wales's).
- Sapper Alfred Whitfield, Royal Engineers.
- Private Bernard Wigglesworth, The Lincolnshire Regiment.
- Staff-Sergeant (acting Battery Quartermaster-Sergeant) Edward Joseph Wigley, Royal Artillery.
- Corporal Albert Edward Wolland, The King's Royal Rifle Corps.
- Sergeant Gordon Woods, Warwickshire Home Guard.
- Staff-Sergeant Phyllis Kate Worrow, Auxiliary Territorial Service.
- Flight Sergeant Eric Barber, Royal Australian Air Force.
- Flight Sergeant Claude Banks, Royal Air Force.
- Flight Sergeant Wilfred Boughton, Royal Air Force.
- Flight Sergeant John Main Duggie, Royal Air Force.
- Flight Sergeant Frank Thomas Ethelstone, Royal Air Force.
- Flight Sergeant Joseph Lee Forster, Royal Air Force.
- Flight Sergeant Ian Douglas Fraser, Royal Air Force.
- Flight Sergeant Cecil John Edward Golding, South African Air Force.
- Flight Sergeant John Gray, Royal Air Force.
- Flight Sergeant (now Pilot Officer) Peter Leslie Kelly, Royal Air Force.
- Flight Sergeant Daniel Keyter, South African Air Force.
- Flight Sergeant (now Pilot Officer) Albert Ridley Nash, Royal Air Force.
- Flight Sergeant William Pickup, Royal Air Force.
- Flight Sergeant Albert Arthur Warren, Royal Air Force.
- Acting Flight Sergeant Hugh Adams, Auxiliary Air Force.
- Acting Flight Sergeant Leslie Charles Andrews, Royal Air Force.
- Acting Flight Sergeant William Thomas Bussey, Royal Air Force.
- Acting Flight Sergeant William George Cooper, Royal Air Force.
- Acting Flight Sergeant Reginald Cecil Frank Cottrell, Royal Air Force.
- Acting Flight Sergeant Thomas Archie Evans, Royal Air Force.
- Acting Flight Sergeant Ernest William Hayward, Royal Air Force Volunteer Reserve.
- Acting Flight Sergeant Graham Tucker Hook, Auxiliary Air Force.
- Acting Flight Sergeant Ernest Raymond Jones, Royal Air Force.
- Acting Flight Sergeant Edward Mills, Royal Air Force Volunteer Reserve.
- Sergeant Stanley Charles Mitcheal Ames, Royal Air Force Volunteer Reserve.
- Sergeant Frank Wittwer Barling, Royal Air Force Volunteer Reserve.
- Sergeant George Duffin, Royal Air Force.
- Sergeant Kenneth Walter Penny, Royal Air Force.
- Sergeant Harry George Stewart, Royal Canadian Air Force.
- Sergeant Robert Alexander Maber Thompson, Royal Air Force.
- Sergeant (now Flying Officer) Wilfred George Toogood, Royal Air Force.
- Sergeant Ronald Charles Lewis Williams, Royal Air Force Volunteer Reserve.
- Corporal William Henry Abbs, Royal Air Force Volunteer Reserve.
- Corporal Hugh Barr, Royal Air Force.
- Corporal Frank Davies, Royal Air Force Volunteer Reserve.
- Corporal Ronald Percy William Fairbrother, Royal Air Force Volunteer Reserve.
- Corporal William James Friend, Royal Air Force Volunteer Reserve.
- Corporal Vincent Leonard Maynard, Royal Air Force Volunteer Reserve.
- Corporal Blair Alexander Traill, Royal Air Force Volunteer Reserve.
- Leading Aircraftman Joseph William Hawley, Royal Air Force Volunteer Reserve.
- Leading Aircraftman Walter Leaver, Royal Air Force Volunteer Reserve.
- Leading Aircraftman George Thomas Lucas, Royal Air Force Volunteer Reserve.
- Flight Sergeant Ethel Frances Alberta France, Women's Auxiliary Air Force.
- Flight Sergeant Nancy Mary Shepherd, Women's Auxiliary Air Force.
- Leading Aircraftwoman Pauline Mary Budd, Women's Auxiliary Air Force.

Australia:

- Driver Constantine Aroney, Australian Imperial Force.
- Sergeant Clive Lovell Bailey, Royal Australian Artillery, Australian Imperial Force.
- Sergeant Robert Bastow, Australian Imperial Force.
- Staff-Sergeant Horace Walter Board, Royal Australian Artillery, Australian Imperial Force.
- Sergeant John Robert Christie, Australian Imperial Force.
- Gunner Donald Basil Cross, Royal Australian Artillery, Australian Imperial Force.
- Sergeant Kenneth Hooke Lean, Australian Imperial Force.
- Sapper Alan Victor Findlay McDonald, Royal Australian Engineers, Australian Imperial Force.
- Corporal John Stevens, Australian Imperial Force.
- Sergeant Henry Charles Langton Tanner, Royal Australian Engineers, Australian Imperial Force.
- Corporal Lesley Frances Warne, Australian Imperial Force.
- Sergeant Edward Charles Wellman, Royal Australian Engineers, Australian Imperial Force.

New Zealand:

- Sergeant Leslie Marchant Amos, New Zealand Military Forces.
- Sergeant William George Bailey, New Zealand Engineers, New Zealand Military Forces.
- Staff-Sergeant Francis Joseph Horby Brown, New Zealand Military Forces.
- Staff-Sergeant (temporary Warrant Officer, Class I) Eric Rowland Firth, New Zealand Military Forces.
- Sergeant James Gordon Free, New Zealand Military Forces.
- Sergeant Alick William Nathan, New Zealand Territorial Force.
- Staff-Sergeant Harry Tavendale, New Zealand Military Forces.
- Lance-Sergeant Murray Reginald Waddell, New Zealand Engineers, New Zealand Military Forces.
- Corporal Walter Lloyd Fairweather, Royal New Zealand Air Force.

Civil Division

- Archibald James Hall, Chauffeur to the Premier of Victoria, Commonwealth of Australia.
- Kifayat Mahmood Ali, Officiating Tahsildar and Officer-in-Charge, Labour Depot, Gorakhpur, United Provinces.
- Malik Muhammad Azam, Officer-in-Charge, Meat Dehydration Factory, Nowshera, North-West Frontier Province.
- John Barrett, Foreman, Inspectorate of Military Carriages, Jubbulpore.
- Maulvi Choudhury Fateh Ali Khan, Sergeant-Major, Orissa Police.
- Babu Saroda Charan Mitra, Clerk of Works, Calcutta Improvement Trust, Bengal.
- Gerald William Longman, Superintendent, Special Prison, Sukkur, Sind.
- Sri Botta Appalaswami Nayudu, Officiating Inspector of Excise, Madras.
- James Francis Robson, Foreman, General Repair Shop, Electrical Workshops, Moghalpura, North-Western Railway.
- Prabhakar Manjunath Tuggarse, Range Forest Officer, Kulgi Range, North Kanara Division, Bombay.
- Donald Wade Young, Superintendent, Native Location, Nairobi, Kenya.
- Francis Agius, Inspector, Malta Police.
- Paul Costa, Foreman, Demolition and Clearance Department, Malta.
- Miss Mary Gatt, Secretary, Help the Homeless Fund, Malta.
- Joseph Penza, Protection Officer, Luqa, Malta.
- Edgar Psaila, Protection Officer, Three Villages, Malta.
- Lawrence Vassallo, Sanitary Inspector, Malta. Morgan Davies, Permanent Way Inspector, Palestine Railways.
- Nathan Friedman, Foreman, Palestine Railways.
- Khalil Tabib Hadid, Sanitary Sub-Inspector, Palestine.
- Sheikh Saleh Es Salim, President of the Local Council of Saffuriya, Palestine.

== Imperial Service Medal ==
- Shaikh Bhola Munshi, Transport Munshi, Government House, Calcutta, Bengal.
- Kalyansing Jijibhai, Excise Jamadar, Excise Department, Bombay.
- Likokyangba Ao, Interpreter, Naga Hills District, Assam.
- Krishnaji Laxman Mahagaonkar, Naik, Office of the Mamlatdar, Palghar, Thana District, Bombay.
- Mardan Ali, Head Constable, Rawalpindi District, Punjab.
- Rahim Baksh Shaik, Telegraph Messenger, Bengal and Assam Circle.
- Sobha Ram, Duftri, Military Secretary's Branch, General Headquarters, India.

== Distinguished Service Order (DSO) ==
- Commander Edward Campbell Lacy Day, Royal Navy (Londonderry).

== Bar to the Distinguished Service Cross ==
- Temporary Lieutenant Derek George Harbroe Wright, R.N.V.R. (Hampstead).

== Distinguished Service Cross (DSC) ==
- Commander Stuart Austen Buss, M.V.O., Royal Navy.
- Commander Leonard Chisholm Sinker, Royal Navy (Woking, Surrey).
- Commander John Frances Whitfeld, Royal Navy (Battle, Sussex).
- Acting Commander Reginald Edgar Woodriffe, Royal Navy.
- Commander Harold Edward Reilly, R.D., R.N.R. (Retired) (Westcliff-on-Sea).
- Commander Ismay James Tyson, R.D., R.N.R.
- Commander (E) Trevor Sydney Hayes, Royal Navy (Cosham).
- Lieutenant-Commander Robert Patrick Seafield Grant, Royal Navy (Harleston, Norfolk).
- Lieutenant-Commander Gerald MacClelland, Royal Navy (Scaldwick, Huntingdon).
- Lieutenant-Commander Charles Harington Pollock, Royal Navy.
- Acting Lieutenant-Commander Peter Cecil Chorley, Royal Navy.
- Lieutenant-Commander John Norman Hulse, R.D., R.N.R.
- Lieutenant-Commander Patrick George Alexander King, R.D., R.N.R.
- Lieutenant-Commander Henry Silvester Warren, R.N.R.
- Acting Lieutenant-Commander William George Howe Bolton, R.N.R. (Plymouth).
- Acting Lieutenant-Commander Hugh Parker Crail, R.N.R. (Mill Hill).
- Acting Temporary Lieutenant-Commander John Green, R.N.R. (Southport).
- Acting Temporary Lieutenant-Commander Neil Frederick Israel, R.N.R.
- Acting Temporary Lieutenant-Commander John Carmichael, R.N.V.R. (Reay, Thurso).
- Acting Temporary Lieutenant-Commander James Archibald Ludlow, R.N.V.R. (Hoylake, Cheshire).
- Temporary Acting Lieutenant-Commander John Tatton Ridd, R.N.V.R. (Henley-on-Thames).
- Temporary Acting Lieutenant-Commander Geoffrey Shaw-Brundell, R.N.V.R.
- Temporary Lieutenant-Commander (E) William Bruce Nisbet, R.N.R.
- Acting Lieutenant-Commander (E) John Charles Belfour Anderson, R.N.R. (Bayswater, West Australia).
- Paymaster Lieutenant-Commander Norman Steel Grant, Royal Navy.
- Lieutenant Patrick Graham Satow, Royal Navy (Kettering).
- Lieutenant Anthony Savage Tyers, Royal Navy (Liverpool).
- Lieutenant Thomas Evelyn Fanshawe, R.N.R. (Saffron Walden).
- Temporary Lieutenant Edward Charles Davids, R.N.R.
- Temporary Lieutenant Frederick George Dawson, R.N.R.
- Temporary Lieutenant Thomas Paxton, R.N.R.
- Temporary Lieutenant Ernest Smith, R.N.R. (Goole).
- Temporary Lieutenant William Milne Smith, R.N.R.
- Temporary Lieutenant Ewart Leslie Wathen, R.N.R.
- Temporary Lieutenant Magnus Spence Work, R.N.R. (Londonderry).
- Lieutenant Frederick Douglas Lang, R.N.V.R.
- Lieutenant Geoffrey Herbert Walker, R.N.V.R. (Ryton-on-Tyne).
- Temporary Lieutenant John Reginald Angelbeck, R.N.V.R.
- Temporary Lieutenant Edward George le Gassick Berry, R.N, V.R. (Claygate).
- Temporary Lieutenant Peter Thompson Clothier, R.N.V.R.
- Temporary Lieutenant James Ian Cruikshank, R.N.V.R. (Teddington).
- Temporary Lieutenant Peter Knowles, R.N.V.R. (Sherwood, Nottingham).
- Temporary Lieutenant James Basil Colgate Lumsden, R.N.V.R.
- Temporary Lieutenant Edgley Morris, R.N.V.R. (Manchester).
- Temporary Lieutenant Arthur Leonard Mulcare, R.N.V.R. (Cleethorpes).
- Temporary Lieutenant Norman Maynard Parry, R.N.V.R. (Harrow).
- Temporary Lieutenant Richard Michael Ritchie, R.N.V.R.
- Temporary Lieutenant The Hon. John Francis Arthur St. Aubyn, R.N.V.R.
- Temporary Lieutenant Charles Frederick Unwin, R.N.V.R. (Bournemouth).
- Lieutenant Brian Hegarty, S.A.N.F.
- Lieutenant Frank Robert Collier, S.A.N.F. (V).
- Temporary Lieutenant (A) John Philip Scott, R.N.V.R.
- Temporary Lieutenant (A) Donald Brian Shaw, R.N.V.R. (Albrighton, Shropshire).
- Temporary Lieutenant (E) Kenneth MacAllister MacLeod, R.N.R. (Taynuilt, Argyll).
- Temporary Paymaster Lieutenant James Joseph Louis Henegan, R.N.V.R.
- Temporary Paymaster Lieutenant Eustace John Offord, R.N.V.R. (Torquay).
- Acting Skipper Lieutenant Samuel Leonard Lamer, R.N.R., 2920 W.S. (Milford Haven).
- Acting Temporary Skipper Lieutenant John Russell Watson, R.N.R., 150 T.S. (Glasgow).
- Skipper Robert Baxter, R.N.R., 199 T.S. (Grimsby).
- Temporary Skipper Harold Acum, R.N.R. (Hessle, Yorkshire).
- Temporary Skipper Colin Chandler, R.N.R. 163 T.S. (Cleethorpes).
- Temporary Skipper Ernest Bertie Morley, R.N.R., 319 T.S. (Goriestone, Great Yarmouth).
- Temporary Skipper Angus Harry Watson Pendle, R.N.R., 140 T.S. (Occold, Sussex).
- Temporary Sub-Lieutenant (A) John Arundel Barnes, R.N.V.R.
- Temporary Sub-Lieutenant (A) John Walsh Barnes, R.N.V.R. (Newbury, Berkshire).
- Temporary Sub-Lieutenant (A) James Monteith Threlkeld, R.N.V.R.
- Mr. James Wright Beattie Brisbane, Gunner, Royal Navy.
- Mr. John Charles Stephen Brown, Signal Boatswain, Royal Navy (Stanley, Co. Durham).
- Mr. Stanley Gordon Legge, Commissioned Engineer, Royal Navy (Portsmouth).
- Mr. Kenneth Perowne Clarke, Commissioned Engineer, Royal Navy (Portsmouth).
- Mr. Edward George Gillett, Commissioned Engineer, Royal Navy (Bishop's Stortford).
- Mr. Leslie Harold Norgate, Warrant Engineer, Royal Navy.
- Captain Thomas Elder, Master, R.F.A.
- Mr. Charles Albert Smith, Chief Engineer Officer, R.F.A.

== Distinguished Service Medal (DSM) ==
- Chief Petty Officer George Edwin Barnes (Lewisham).
- Chief Petty Officer Herbert Samuel Bayne (Gillingham, Kent).
- Chief Petty Officer Sidney Arthur Beer.
- Chief Petty Officer William Francis Cornelius Davis (Barnstaple).
- Chief Petty Officer Bertram Francis Dorey (Purbrook, Hampshire).
- Chief Petty Officer John Vincent Goldsmith (Winchester).
- Chief Petty Officer William Cormack Smith Mitchell (Lossiemouth).
- Chief Petty Officer Sydney George Pikesley.
- Chief Petty Officer Frederick Charles Rooke (Portsmouth).
- Chief Petty Officer Frank Reginald Wills (South Molton, Devon).
- Chief Petty Officer Frederick John Wright.
- Acting Chief Petty Officer Giles Frederick Scott.
- Acting Chief Petty Officer Frederick John Studd (Chatham).
- Chief Petty Officer Airman Lewis George Long.
- Chief Yeoman of Signals Noel Glencoe Bowyer.
- Chief Yeoman of Signals John Alfred Cresswell.
- Chief Yeoman of Signals Frank Jones.
- Chief Yeoman of Signals Arthur Willmott.
- Chief Petty Officer Telegraphist James Joseph Kennett (Portsmouth).
- Chief Engine Room Artificer Horace Birkhead (East Audsley, Yorkshire).
- Chief Engine Room Artificer Allerton Bywater (Colmore, Hampshire).
- Chief Engine Room Artificer George William Manby.
- Chief Engine Room Artificer John Tomlin (Gillingham, Kent).
- Chief Engine Room Artificer Edward Atkinson Walker (Rainham, Kent).
- Acting Chief Motor Mechanic Alfred Vincent Thorn (Great Yarmouth).
- Chief Stoker Percy Frederick Back (Faversham).
- Chief Stoker Albert Edney (Portsmouth).
- Second Hand Tom Nixon Harrison (Hull).
- Second Hand Charles John Manthorpe.
- Second Hand Charles Strickland (Hull).
- Chief Engineman William Farquhar, R.N.P.S. (Aberdeen).
- Chief Engineman George Alexander Harrow, R.N.R. (Aberdeen).
- Chief Engineman Charles Frederick Hoodless.
- Chief Engineman John Watt, R.N.R. (Aberdeen).
- Petty Officer Motor Mechanic Ernest George Wishart.
- Temporary Acting Petty Officer Air Mechanic (E) William Peter Moorcroft.
- Petty Officer Engineman Ernest Victor Stone, R.N.P.S.
- Temporary Convoy Yeoman Eric Mintoft.
- Temporary Acting Convoy Yeoman Eric William Dennis.
- Temporary Acting Convoy Yeoman Arthur Maurice John Durrant.
- Yeoman of Signals William James Luxton.
- Yeoman of Signals Richard Parmliey (Plymouth).
- Yeoman of Signals Francis Charles White.
- Temporary Yeoman of Signals Arthur Henry Chilvers Ford (High Wycombe).
- Petty Officer Telegraphist Ernest Brown.
- Petty Officer Motor Mechanic Douglas Charles Steel, (Paddington).
- Petty Officer Motor Mechanic George Ernest Jones, (Chester).
- Petty Officer Canteen Manager James Gordon Hickman, (Darlington).
- Stoker Petty Officer Howard John George Edwards.
- Engine Room Artificer Fourth Class Laurence Michael McDonnell, (Birmingham).
- Marine (Acting Temporary Sergeant) Horace Herbert Edwards, R.M. (Blackpool).
- Acting Temporary Sergeant Kenneth Ernest Cyril Churchill (Gosport).
- Acting Temporary Sergeant Harry William Lovell Goode, R.M. (Bushey, Hertfordshire).
- Corporal Herbert Joseph Cobb, R.M. (Newark).
- Leading Seaman Ernest McDowell (Copnor).
- Leading Seaman Edward Payne, R.N.P.S. (Hull).
- Leading Seaman Cyril George Vincent, R.N.P.S. (Millwall).
- Temporary Leading Seaman Ernest Henry James Steer (Horsham).
- Acting Leading Seaman William Allen, R.N.R.
- Acting Leading Seaman George Scarlett.
- Temporary Acting Leading Seaman Harold John Canty-Forrest.
- Temporary Acting Leading Seaman Frederick Gilbert Hann (Leigh-on-Sea).
- Temporary Acting Leading Seaman James McAllister (Belfast).
- Temporary Acting Leading Seaman Herbert Martin (Plymouth).
- Temporary Acting Leading Seaman Harold George Edward Smith.
- Leading Signalman William Henry Tremere (Hull).
- Acting Leading Signalman William John Irvine (Liverpool).
- Leading Wireman John Richard Nicholls, R.N.P.S. (Tottenham, N.17).
- Able Seaman John Edwin Adcock (Barwell, Leicester).
- Able Seaman John Birchall.
- Able Seaman Clifford Chant.
- Able Seaman George William Guyenette (St. Leonards-on-Sea).
- Able Seaman Wilfred Holt, R.F.R. (Rochdale, Lancashire).
- Able Seaman William John Kirby (Tilmanstone, Sandwich).
- Able Seaman Dennis Albert Owen.
- Able Seaman Samuel Lorimer Stewart (Dudley, Worcestershire).
- Stoker First Class James Roberts, R.N.P.S.
- Seaman Horace Alfred Hook, R.N.P.S. (Chichester).
- Seaman William Taylor McAlpine, R.N.P.S. (Gorebridgen, Midlothian).
- Seaman Thomas McKie, R.N.P.S. (Liverpool).
- Seaman Daniel Roberts, R.N.P.S. (Newton, Newfoundland).
- Seaman Bertram Charles Sturdee Smale, (Tavistock, Devon).
- Seaman Norman Henry Webb, R.N.P.S. (Ilford, Essex).
- Engineman John Owen Garner, R.N.P.S. (Grimsby).
- Engineman William Henry Hearn, R.N.R. (Glimsby).
- Engineman Harold Slade, R.N.P.S. (Hull).
- Telegraphist Robert Phillips (Kingsbridge).
- Telegraphist John Swingler Richardson.
- Ordinary Telegraphist Ronald Boshell (Beeston, Leeds).
- Signalman Victor Charles Robinson, R.N.P.S. (Stourbridge).
- Steward James Cuthbert Gratton, R.N.P.S. (Stoke-on-Trent).
