= 1970 Dissolution Honours =

British government recognitions

The 1970 Dissolution Honours List was issued on 2 June 1970 to mark the dissolution of the United Kingdom parliament prior to the 1970 general election.

The recipients of honours are displayed here as they were styled before their new honour.

== Life Peers ==
=== Baronesses ===
- Rt Hon. Priscilla Jean Fortescue, Baroness Tweedsmuir, Member of Parliament for South Aberdeen, 1946-66. Parliamentary Under-Secretary of State, Scottish Office, 1962-64.

=== Barons ===
- Rt Hon. Evelyn Nigel Chetwode Birch OBE, Member of Parliament for Flintshire, 1945–50 and for West Flintshire, 1950-70. Parliamentary Under-Secretary of State, Air Ministry, 1951–52; Parliamentary Secretary, Ministry of Defence, 1952–54; Minister of Works, 1954-55; Secretary of State for Air, 1955–57; Economic Secretary to the Treasury, 1957-58.
- Rt Hon. Sir Edward Charles Gurney Boyle Bt, Member of Parliament for the Handsworth Division of Birmingham, 1950-70. Parliamentary Secretary, Ministry of Supply, 1954–55; Economic Secretary to the Treasury, 1955–56; Parliamentary Secretary, Ministry of Education, 1957–59; Financial Secretary to the Treasury, 1959–62; Minister of Education, 1962–64; Minister of State, Department of Education and Science, 1964.
- Rt Hon. Sir Eric George Molyneux Fletcher, Member of Parliament for East Islington, 1945-70. Minister without Portfolio, 1964–66; Chairman of Ways and Means and Deputy Speaker, 1966-68.
- Rt Hon. James Hutchison Hoy DL, Member of Parliament for Leith, 1945–50 and for the Leith Division of Edinburgh, 1950-70. Parliamentary Secretary, Ministry of Agriculture, Fisheries and Food since October 1964.
- Sir Barnett Janner, Member of Parliament for West Leicester, 1945–50 and for the North West Division of Leicester, 1950-70.
- Rt Hon. Sir John Kenyon Vaughan-Morgan Bt, Member of Parliament for the Reigate Division of Surrey, 1950-70. Parliamentary Secretary, Ministry of Health, 1957; Minister of State, Board of Trade, 1957-59.
- Rt Hon. Emanuel Shinwell CH, Member of Parliament for Linlithgow, 1922–24 and 1928–31, for the Seaham Division of Durham, 1935–50 and for Easington, 1950-70. Parliamentary Secretary, Department of Mines, 1924 and 1930–31; Financial Secretary, War Office, 1929–30; Minister of Fuel and Power, 1945–47; Secretary of State for War, 1947–50; Minister of Defence, 1950-51.
- Joseph Slater BEM, Member of Parliament for the Sedgefield Division of Durham, 1950-70. Assistant Postmaster General, 1964–69; Parliamentary Secretary, Ministry of Posts and Telecommunications, 1969.
