= Newton Aycliffe and Spennymoor =

UK Parliament constituency (since 2024)

- County constituency for the House of Commons
- Interactive map of boundaries since 2024
- Location within North East England
- County: County Durham
- Electorate: 71,299 (March 2020)
- Major settlements: Newton Aycliffe, Spennymoor, Sedgefield, Ferryhill, Bowburn

Current constituency
- Created: 2024
- Member of Parliament: Alan Strickland (Labour)
- Seats: One
- Created from: Sedgefield; Bishop Auckland (part); City of Durham (part)

Newton Aycliffe and Spennymoor is a constituency of the House of Commons in the UK Parliament. Following the completion of the 2023 review of Westminster constituencies, it was first contested at the 2024 general election. The seat was won by Alan Strickland MP of Labour, with a majority of 8,839 and a vote share of 46.2%.

== Constituency profile ==
Newton Aycliffe and Spennymoor is a constituency in County Durham. It is named after its two largest towns, Newton Aycliffe and Spennymoor, which have populations of around 26,000 and 22,000 respectively. Other settlements include the towns of Chilton, Ferryhill and Sedgefield and the villages of Bowburn, Coxhoe and Trimdon.

Newton Aycliffe is a new town founded and developed after World War II and is the site of a large industrial estate. Spennymoor and most of the other towns and villages in the constituency have a history of coal mining. Like many former coal mining areas in the United Kingdom, they experienced large-scale unemployment in the late 20th century and still have high levels of deprivation. The exception is Sedgefield, which is an affluent market town. House prices across the constituency are generally lower than the rest of North East England and the average price is less than half the national average.

In general, residents of the constituency are older and more likely to be religious compared to the rest of the country. They have low levels of education and average rates of homeownership. Household income is low and the child poverty rate is high. A high proportion of residents work in the manufacturing, transport and construction sectors, and a low percentage claim unemployment benefits. White people made up 98% of the population at the 2021 census.

At the local county council, most of the constituency is represented by Reform UK with some independents elected in Spennymoor and Sedgefield. Voters in the constituency strongly supported leaving the European Union in the 2016 referendum; an estimated 60% voted in favour of Brexit compared to the UK-wide figure of 52%.

== Boundaries ==
Further to the 2023 boundary review, the constituency was defined as composing the following electoral divisions of County Durham from the 2024 general election (as they existed on 1 December 2020):

- Aycliffe East; Aycliffe North and Middridge; Aycliffe West; Bishop Middleham and Cornforth; Chilton; Coxhoe; Ferryhill; Sedgefield; Spennymoor; Trimdon and Thornley (polling districts SKB, SLA, SLB, SMB and SMC); Tudhoe.

The seat was made up of the bulk of the abolished constituency of Sedgefield, expanded to include Spennymoor and Tudhoe from Bishop Auckland, and Coxhoe from City of Durham.

Further to a local government boundary review which came into effect in May 2025, the constituency now comprises the following electoral divisions of County Durham:

- Aycliffe North and Middridge; Aycliffe South; Bowburn and Coxhoe; Chilton; Ferryhill; Sedgefield; Spennymoor (nearly all); Trimdon and Wingate (part - including Trimdon); Tudhoe.

== History ==
The seat is the successor to Sedgefield, most famously represented by former Labour Prime Minister Tony Blair from 1983 to 2007; he led a successful campaign for his party to win the 1997 general election in a landslide and thereafter served for ten years as Prime Minister, resigning as the MP for Sedgefield on the same day as he resigned as prime minister. This triggered a by-election, which was won by Labour's Phil Wilson. In 2019, Sedgefield was gained by the Conservatives for the first time since 1935, a result which would have been replicated if the new seat of Newton Aycliffe and Spennymoor had existed then.

The incumbent MP for Sedgefield, Paul Howell, stood for re-election in the new seat in 2024, but was beaten into third place by Reform UK, with Labour's Alan Strickland winning the seat with a 22.2% majority.

== Members of Parliament ==
Sedgefield prior to 2024

| Election | Member | Party |
|---|---|---|
| 2024 | Alan Strickland | Labour |

== Elections ==
=== Elections in the 2020s ===
Changes in vote share based on national 2019 result

General election 2024: Newton Aycliffe and Spennymoor
| Party | Candidate | Votes | % | ±% |
|---|---|---|---|---|
| Labour | Alan Strickland | 18,394 | 46.2 | +7.9 |
| Reform | John Grant | 9,555 | 24.0 | +16.2 |
| Conservative | Paul Howell | 8,195 | 20.6 | −25.5 |
| Green | Jack Hughes | 1,701 | 4.3 | +2.8 |
| Liberal Democrats | Anne-Marie Curry | 1,491 | 3.7 | −1.7 |
| Transform | Brian Agar | 264 | 0.7 | N/A |
| Workers Party | Minhajul Suhon | 246 | 0.6 | N/A |
| Rejected ballots | | 79 | | |
| Majority | | 8,839 | 22.2 | N/A |
| Turnout | | 39,846 | 55.2 | −5.6 |
| Registered electors | | 72,224 | | |
| Labour win (new seat) | | | | |

- Paul Howell (Conservative) ― Incumbent MP for Sedgefield

2019 Notional Results
| Party | Votes | % |
|---|---|---|
| Conservative | 20,014 | 46.1 |
| Labour | 16,606 | 38.3 |
| Brexit Party | 3,374 | 7.8 |
| Liberal Democrats | 2,340 | 5.4 |
| Green | 644 | 1.5 |
| Independent | 394 | 0.9 |

== See also ==
- List of parliamentary constituencies in County Durham
- List of parliamentary constituencies in North East England (region)
