= Meyer baronets =

Baronetcy in the Baronetage of the United Kingdom

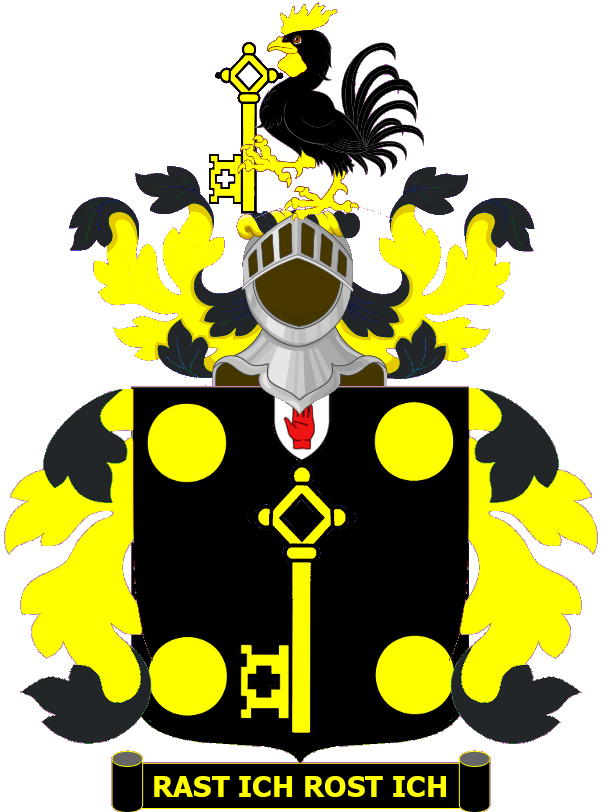
- Crest: A cock sable armed combed and wattled Or holding in the dexter claw a key as in the arms.
- Shield: Sable a key wards downwards Or between four bezants.
- Motto: Rast Ich Rost Ich

The Meyer Baronetcy, of Shortgrove in the parish of Newport in the County of Essex, is a title in the Baronetage of the United Kingdom. It was created on 18 July 1910 for Carl Meyer, financier and director of the National Bank of Egypt.

The 2nd Baronet was Member of Parliament for Great Yarmouth from 1924 to 1929, and the 3rd Baronet for Eton and Slough from 1964 to 1966.

== Meyer baronets, of Shortgrove (1910) ==
- Sir Carl Ferdinand Meyer, 1st Baronet (1851–1922)
- Sir Frank Cecil Meyer, 2nd Baronet (1886–1935)
- Sir Anthony John Charles Meyer, 3rd Baronet (1920–2004)
- Sir Anthony Ashley Frank Meyer, 4th Baronet (born 1944). He is without heir.

== Notes ==
Baronetage of the United Kingdom
Preceded by Lamont baronets	Meyer baronets of Shortgrove; 18 July 1910	Succeeded by Tuck baronets
