= Sir Anthony Meyer, 3rd Baronet =

British politician (1920–2004)

Sir Anthony Meyer Bt
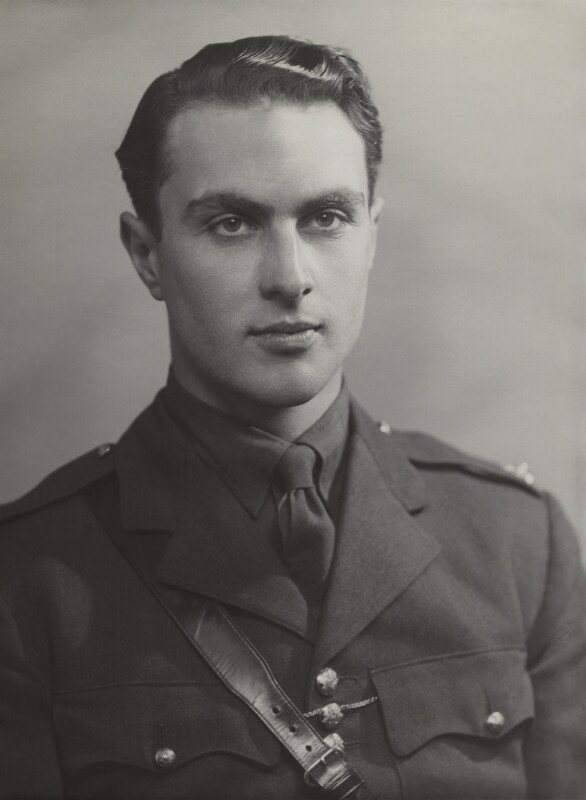
- Meyer in 1941

Member of Parliament
- In office 18 June 1970 – 16 March 1992
- Preceded by: Nigel Birch
- Succeeded by: Rod Richards
- Constituency: West Flintshire (1970–1983); Clwyd North West (1983–1992)
- In office 15 October 1964 – 10 March 1966
- Preceded by: Fenner Brockway
- Succeeded by: Joan Lestor
- Constituency: Eton and Slough

Personal details
- Born: Anthony John Charles Meyer; 27 October 1920 London, England
- Died: 24 December 2004 (aged 84) London, England
- Party: Liberal Democrats (2001-2004)
- Other political affiliations: Conservative (until 1998); Pro-Euro Conservative (1998–2001)
- Spouse: Barbadee Knight (m. 1941)
- Children: 4
- Parent: Sir Frank Meyer (father)
- Relatives: Sir Carl Meyer (grandfather)
- Education: Eton College
- Alma mater: New College, Oxford
- Profession: Diplomat; Soldier; Politician

Military service
- Allegiance: United Kingdom
- Branch/service: British Army
- Unit: Scots Guards

Sir Anthony John Charles Meyer, 3rd Baronet (27 October 1920 – 24 December 2004) was a British soldier, diplomat, and Conservative MP, best known for standing against Margaret Thatcher for the party leadership in 1989. In spite of his staunch conservative views on economic policy, his passionate support of increased British integration into the European Union led to him becoming increasingly marginalised in Thatcher's Conservative Party.

After being deselected as a Conservative parliamentary candidate for the 1992 general election, Meyer became policy director of the European Movement, and in 1998 he joined the Pro-Euro Conservative Party. After that disbanded in 2001, he became a member of the Liberal Democrats.

== Background ==
Meyer was born in London on 27 October 1920, the son of Marjorie Amy Georgina (née Seeley) and Sir Frank Cecil Meyer. His father was vice-chairman of the De Beers diamond company, and from 1924 to 1929 he was Conservative Member of Parliament for Great Yarmouth, Norfolk. His father was from a Jewish family. His grandfather, Sir Carl Meyer, 1st Baronet, was born in Hamburg, Germany; he migrated to Britain in the late 19th century, when he worked for the Rothschilds, and later for De Beers; he eventually became Governor of the National Bank of Egypt and was given a baronetcy for the large donations he made to found a National Theatre in Britain.

=== Education and war service ===
Meyer was educated at Sandroyd School in Surrey before winning a scholarship to Eton College. He inherited the baronetcy when his father died in a hunting accident on 19 October 1935. Like his father, he also attended New College, Oxford, but after one year he joined the Scots Guards in 1941, the same year he married Barbadee Knight; they had one son and three daughters. In 1944, during the battle for Caen, in the break-out from the Normandy invasion beaches he was seriously wounded when the tank he was travelling in was hit, and he spent the next nine months on his back in hospital. During this time he read extensively to make up for his lost years at Oxford, but decided not to return to university. Instead, he joined HM Treasury where he mostly worked on winding up the affairs of the Polish government-in-exile.

=== Diplomatic career ===
In 1946 Meyer passed the Foreign Service examinations, and from 1951 to 1956 he was appointed to the British Embassy in Paris, where he became First Secretary in 1953. The subsequent appointment to the embassy in Moscow was not so enjoyable – he did not speak the language, and confined to the "diplomatic ghetto" through the Soviet government's ban on foreign contacts with its citizens, he said he did not have a job to do. He was rescued by a Soviet attempt to compromise him – he reported an attempt to lure him into a cab by a woman agent to the ambassador, who put Meyer and his family on the next plane home. Between 1958 and 1962, he worked at the Foreign Office on European political problems, at a time when the Office was changing its policy from being against the "Common Market" to in favour of Britain's joining it.

== Political career ==
=== Entry into politics ===
The death of his mother in 1962 provided Meyer with the family's wealth, and he decided to enter politics to support his pro-European views. That year, he resigned from the Foreign Office to work unpaid for the Common Market Campaign led by Liberal peer Gladwyn Jebb. He later said that he was initially undecided whether to stand for the Conservatives or the Liberals, but his admiration for the Conservative prime minister Harold Macmillan swung his choice.

In 1963, Meyer was selected to fight the constituency of Eton and Slough, then held by Labour's leftwing internationalist Fenner Brockway. In the 1964 General Election, Meyer won the seat by 11 votes, gaining respect by ignoring his constituency party's advice to campaign on the race issue, which could have swung a number of votes in that constituency at the time. His was one of only four Conservative gains in that election. Recognising that he would only be in the seat temporarily, Meyer made the most of his time in Parliament, advocating Britain's joining the Common Market and strengthening the United Nations. He also established himself on the liberal wing of the party: voting to abolish capital punishment and for sanctions against Rhodesia. In the 1966 General Election he lost his seat to Labour's Joan Lestor by 4,663 votes.

His liberalism made him almost untouchable in the Conservative Party, and his applications to stand in six constituencies (including Windsor, where he lived) were rejected, but eventually fellow Old Etonian Nigel Birch recommended Meyer to replace him in the constituency of West Flintshire, in north-eastern Wales. He returned to parliament at the 1970 general election.

=== MP for West Flintshire ===
Meyer became a popular MP in his new constituency, gaining a reputation for putting the interests of his constituency ahead of Conservative government policy, for example by voting against the closure of the Shotton steelworks, supporting the Airbus A300B whose wings some of his constituents built, against its all-British rival the BAC 3-11, while insisting on the importance of an effective pan-European technology. After Labour's return to power in 1974, he opposed continued sanctions against the white minority government in Rhodesia, claiming that it was intended to transfer power "forcibly to a violent minority".

When the Conservative party returned to power under Margaret Thatcher in 1979, Meyer's type of pro-Europeanism was at odds with the Euroscepticism of the bulk of the party. When his Flintshire West constituency's boundaries were expanded and redrawn to form the Clwyd North West constituency in 1983, there was an attempt by local party activists to replace him with the more Thatcherite MEP, Beata Brookes, whom Meyer managed to defeat.

=== Leadership challenge ===
On 23 November 1989, at a time of both Thatcher's and the Conservative Party's waning popularity and shortly after Nigel Lawson's resignation as chancellor, 69-year-old Meyer put himself forward as the pro-European stalking horse for the leadership of the Conservative Party. Meyer fully expected that one of the more prominent pro-Europeans such as Ian Gilmour or Michael Heseltine would take over the role; in the event, none of them did so, and Meyer had no illusions that he had any chance of success. He was derided as "Sir Anthony Whats'isname" by the pro-Thatcher Sun newspaper, who reported that he was the only Conservative MP to oppose the use of force to win back the Falkland Islands following the Argentine invasion of 1982 and had backed a number of Labour policies, including votes against Tory-led welfare benefit cuts and immigration issues. He was also slammed by the Daily Express as "Sir Nobody".

In the 1989 leadership election on 5 December, Meyer was defeated by 314 votes to 33, but when spoilt votes and abstentions were added it was discovered that 60 MPs out of 374 had failed to support Thatcher. Meyer said that "people started to think the unthinkable", and Thatcher was ousted in November 1990 to be succeeded by John Major. Michael Heseltine, who would challenge Thatcher the following year, was reported by The Glasgow Herald as being believed to be one of the three MPs who did not vote in the contest. The same newspaper also reported that in the aftermath of the vote Heseltine's supporters argued the result showed that unless Mrs Thatcher changed "her style of leadership", she would "be on her way out next year".

On 19 January 1990, Meyer was deselected as a candidate for the 1992 general election by the Clwyd North West constituency party for his "treachery", by a 2–1 majority. The deselection campaign was enlivened by a tabloid newspaper's revelation that Meyer had for 26 years had an affair with Simone Washington, a former model and blues singer.

== Post-parliamentary career ==
Following his forced career change in 1992 Meyer became policy director for the European Movement, and in 1998 he defected to the Pro-Euro Conservative Party before becoming a member of the Liberal Democrats. In 1999 he stood unsuccessfully, during the European Parliament elections, for the London seat. After 1999 he became a lecturer on European affairs until his death.

== Death ==
Meyer died from colorectal cancer at his home in Chelsea, London, on 24 December 2004, at the age of 84. His son, Anthony Ashley Frank Meyer (born 1944), succeeded him in the baronetcy.

== In popular culture ==
Meyer was portrayed by Geoffrey Wilkinson in the 2002 BBC production of Ian Curteis' controversial The Falklands Play.

== Arms ==
Coat of arms of Sir Anthony Meyer, 3rd Baronet
Crest A cock sable armed combed and wattled Or holding in the dexter claw a key as in the arms. Escutcheon Sable a key wards downwards Or between four bezants. Motto Rast Ich Rost Ich

(German: I rest, I rust)

== Legacy ==
The Papers of Sir Anthony Meyer are housed at the British Library. The papers can be accessed through the British Library catalogue.

Parliament of the United Kingdom
Preceded by Fenner Brockway	Member of Parliament for Eton and Slough; 1964–1966	Succeeded by Joan Lestor
Preceded by Nigel Birch	Member of Parliament for West Flintshire; 1970–1983	Constituency abolished
New constituency	Member of Parliament for Clwyd North West; 1983–1992	Succeeded by Rod Richards
Baronetage of the United Kingdom
Preceded by Frank Meyer	Baronet (of Shortgrove); 1935–2004	Succeeded by Anthony Meyer
