= Chilton, County Durham =

Town in County Durham, England

Coordinates: 54.66°N 1.55°W

Chilton
- Location within County Durham
- Population: 4,695 (2021)
- OS grid reference: NZ285295
- Unitary authority: County Durham
- Ceremonial county: County Durham
- Region: North East
- Country: England
- Sovereign state: United Kingdom
- Post town: FERRYHILL
- Postcode district: DL17
- Dialling code: 01388
- Police: Durham
- Fire: County Durham and Darlington
- Ambulance: North East
- UK Parliament: Newton Aycliffe and Spennymoor

Chilton is a town in County Durham, England. It is situated a few miles to the east of Bishop Auckland and a short distance to the south of Ferryhill, on the A167.

== History ==
Chilton was originally a mining town and called Chilton Buildings. The mine was located on the site of the current primary school, with the miners living in Windlestone Colliery, a series of terraced houses named Albert Street, Arthur Street and Prospect Terrace, locally known as The Five Rows owing to their appearance from the front. Chilton in 1092 was recorded as "Ciltonia". Chilton is derivative of the Anglo-Saxon words "Cild" (Child) and "Tun" (small town, or estate). This does not mean "Children's town" as the word "Child" in Anglo-Saxon means either young monk or young nobleman. Hence Chilton once was "an estate belonging to a young nobleman". Chilton was in the medieval ages noted as two manors, Great Chilton and Little Chilton. Chilton Hall mansion, north-east of Chilton, was once owned by the Heron family in 1351.

The Hall fell into disrepair several times, before being restored on numerous occasion. Agriculture and farming was a major source of employment until the Industrial Revolution in the mid-1800s, where then people living in the village either had to work in the collieries or at the Steel Works at Spennymoor. St. Aiden's Church, at the top of Chilton, at the roundabout, was built as an iron structure in 1877. The church was burned to the ground in 1928 with an estimate damage cost of £4000 and rebuilt with stone in 1930 at the insistence of Vicar Lancelot Wilkinson.

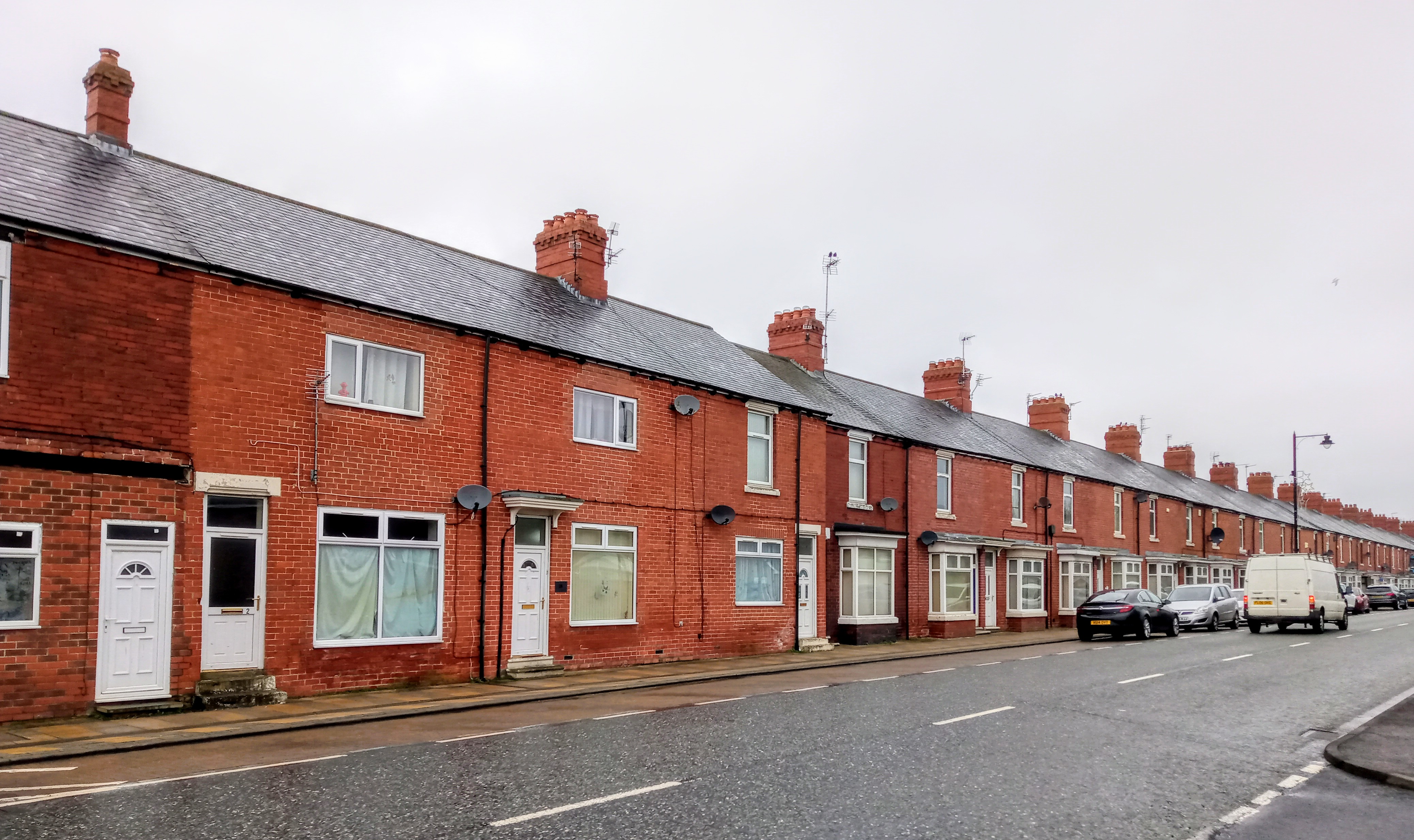
Eden Terrace, Chilton, County Durham.

== Local area ==
Chilton is home to a primary school (Chilton Primary, known as Chilton Junior up until September 2002), for nursery children, to reception, Year 1; right up to Year 6. The school also participates in the Sure Start programme. After leaving Chilton Primary, many pupils go to Ferryhill Business and Enterprise College for secondary education from Year 7 to Year 11.

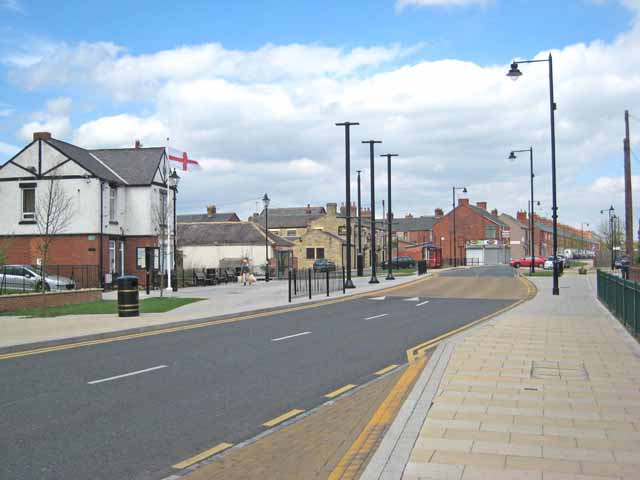
town centre.

There are also two churches, a Catholic church (Sacred Heart) and an Anglican church (St. Aidan's), a post office, a public house, a Sports and Social Club, a Catholic club that serves as a WMC as well as a polling station for the Sedgefield constituency at election times, an NHS healthcare centre, dentist, public library, and two supermarkets. There are three take-away restaurants: a fish and chip shop, a Chinese restaurant, convenience store and a pizzeria.

There is also a football ground and an all-night automatically lit basketball court, as well as recreation areas with swings, slides and climbing apparatus and a skatepark. There are regular bus services to Ferryhill, Spennymoor, Durham, and other towns and cities within the county, such as Hartlepool and Darlington.

The town has a substantial allotment community, serving over 200 allotments.

== Redevelopment and future ==
A road bypass now carries traffic around the town, cutting out around 80% of vehicles travelling through the town itself. The bypass itself was opened in 2005, although the concept was first mooted decades before. To allow the construction of the bypass, West Chilton Terrace was cut in half, as were the allotments behind. A large amount of the social housing in Chilton and all terraces, were to be demolished (a large percentage of Dale Street has already been demolished), but as of April 2010 phase 2 of the plans have been put on hold due to shortage of local government funding.

Chilton gained town status in 2000 (despite lacking common features of a town such as its neighbour, Ferryhill; including a bank, a butcher shop, or even a town hall), along with a town council and mayor.

A new war memorial was built in 2008 to commemorate men from the town who lost their lives in the First and Second World Wars. The names of the fallen are engraved on the marble cenotaph, and each year on Remembrance Sunday there is a ceremony in the morning, when veterans congregate to lay poppy wreaths and civilians can pay their respects to the dead of World War I. In tradition with the day, two minutes of silence are observed at 11.00, to commemorate the armistice on the eleventh hour of the eleventh day of the eleventh month, 1918. If the 11th is not a Sunday, the service is held on the second Sunday in November (nearest to the 11th). The two minutes silence is observed on both days, however. The Sunday ceremony continues to this day.

== Governance ==
An electoral ward in the same name exists. This ward includes Ferryhill with a total population at the 2011 census of 8647.
