= Alan Strickland =

British politician

Alan Strickland MP
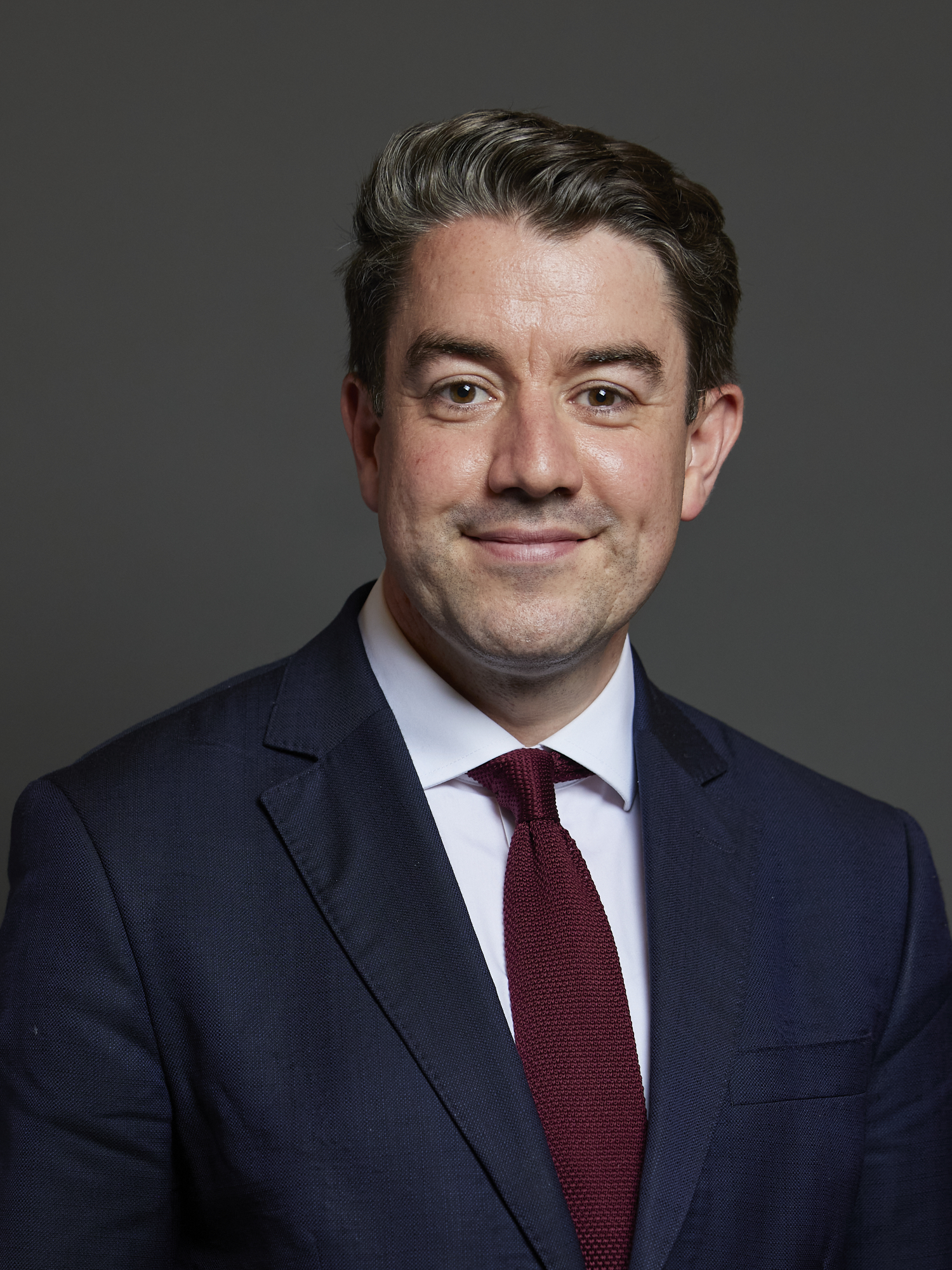
- Official portrait, 2024

Member of Parliament for Newton Aycliffe and Spennymoor
- Incumbent
- Assumed office 4 July 2024
- Preceded by: Constituency established
- Majority: 8,839 (22.2%)

Personal details
- Party: Labour
- Education: Merton College, Oxford (BA) London School of Economics and Political Science (MSc)

Alan David Strickland (born April 1984) is a British Labour Party politician who has been Member of Parliament for Newton Aycliffe and Spennymoor since 2024. The constituency is partially made up of the now-abolished Sedgefield constituency, which was represented by former British Prime Minister, Tony Blair.

== Education ==
Strickland grew up in Newton Aycliffe. He was educated at Stephenson Way Primary School and Woodham Comprehensive School in Newton Aycliffe before going on to study at Queen Elizabeth Sixth Form College in Darlington. He then read Philosophy, politics and economics (PPE) at Merton College, Oxford, where he was President of the Student Union. He studied for a masters degree in social policy at the London School of Economics as a part-time mature student graduating in 2017.

== Early career ==
Strickland began his career at Comic Relief before working for a number of charities including as Senior Policy Manager at Volunteering England and Head of Volunteering Development at the National Council for Voluntary Organisations.

He also served as a trustee of The Conservation Volunteers, vice-chair of Alexandra Park and Palace Charitable Trust and a board member of Sapphire Independent Housing.

He became a director at housing association Optivo in 2018. Following Optivo's merger with Southern Housing Group in 2022, Strickland became Corporate Director for External Affairs and Resident Involvement at Southern Housing.

== Local government ==
He was a councillor for Noel Park ward in Haringey from 2010 to 2018, serving as the cabinet member responsible for housing, regeneration and planning from 2011 to 2018. Following the 2011 riots, Strickland chaired the Tottenham Taskforce, a joint Mayor of London and Haringey Council board responsible for overseeing the regeneration plans for the area.

He led the Tottenham Regeneration Programme, working to secure London's largest housing zone to regenerate the Tottenham Hale area. Strickland oversaw the planning for the new Tottenham Hotspur stadium, including the High Road West development and the rebuilding of White Hart Lane station. Working with the Greater London Authority, Strickland secured funding for the 639 Enterprise Centre and for shopfront improvements in Tottenham High Road and West Green Road.

Strickland secured authority to start Haringey Council's first council house building programme for 25 years and led a number of wider regeneration projects including the restoration of Hornsey Town Hall.

== Parliamentary career ==
Strickland was the Labour parliamentary candidate for the Berwick-upon-Tweed constituency at the General Election in 2010.

Following his election to Parliament, Strickland was appointed Parliamentary Private Secretary to the Secretary of State for Education and Minister for Women and Equalities Bridget Phillipson in July 2024.

Strickland stood down as a Parliamentary Private Secretary in July 2026 in order to run in the election for chair of the Housing, Communities and Local Government Select Committee. He was beaten by former Cabinet Office minister Abena Oppong-Asare, coming second out of six candidates.

He was elected as chair of the Red Wall Caucus in September 2026.

Strickland has also taken part in the Armed Forces Parliamentary Scheme, completing the Royal Air Force programme in 2025 and the Royal Navy strand in 2026.

In 2022 Strickland launched a campaign with the Northern Echo to secure the future of the Hitachi train factory in Aycliffe in his constituency. He hosted Prime Minister Keir Starmer at the factory twice during this campaign. A £500 million order finalised in December 2024 helped safeguard the 700 jobs provided by the plant.

Strickland championed the acquisition of the semi-conductor plant in Aycliffe Business Park by government, to prevent it from closure and maintain sovereign supply of gallium arsenide semiconductors, used in fighter jets. Following work with Defence Secretary John Healey, the facility was purchased by the Ministry of Defence in September 2024 saving 100 jobs. Strickland launched the plant’s apprenticeship programme in 2026.

In his maiden speech, Strickland noted that "Several generations ago, both sides of my family were drawn from mining villages across England to the Durham coalfields because of their reputation for good wages and reliable work."

Parliament of the United Kingdom
New constituency	Member of Parliament for Newton Aycliffe and Spennymoor; 2024-present	Incumbent
