= Leonard Ropner =

English Conservative Party politician

Colonel Sir Leonard Ropner Bt MC TD DL

Member of Parliament for Sedgefield
- In office 6 December 1923 – 10 May 1929
- Preceded by: John Herriotts
- Succeeded by: John Herriotts

Member of Parliament for Barkston Ash
- In office 27 October 1931 – 25 September 1964
- Preceded by: George Lane-Fox
- Succeeded by: Michael Alison

Personal details
- Born: 26 February 1895
- Died: 12 October 1977 (aged 82)
- Party: Conservative

Sir Leonard Ropner, 1st Baronet, MC TD DL (26 February 1895 – 12 October 1977) was a Conservative Party politician in the United Kingdom.

== Background ==
Ropner was the son of William Ropner (1864-1947), of Thorp Perrow, Bedale, Yorkshire, JP, and Sarah Woolacott, daughter of Ebenezer Cory, of West Hartlepool, County Durham. William Ropner was the third son of Sir Robert Ropner, 1st Baronet, who had come from Germany in 1857 and founded a fleet of merchant ships; as MP he represented Stockton-on-Tees. He was educated at Oatlands, Harrogate and Harrow, obtaining a scholarship to Clare College, Cambridge and took a degree in Political Economy. He was a director of the family business of Sir R. Ropner and Co., the shipping company.

== Career ==
He enlisted in 1914 in the Royal Artillery and commanded a battery in France, being awarded the Military Cross in 1919. After the war he commanded the Durham Heavy Brigade of the Royal Garrison Artillery in the Territorial Army in the rank of major, and was later appointed their honorary colonel.

At the 1923 general election, he was elected Member of Parliament (MP) for Sedgefield in County Durham, with a majority of only 6 votes over the sitting Labour MP John Herriotts. Ropner held the seat at the 1924 general election with a more comfortable majority of 1,416, but lost to Herriotts at the 1929 general election.

He returned to the House of Commons at the 1931 general election, for the safe Conservative seat of Barkston Ash in the West Riding of Yorkshire. He represented the constituency until he retired from Parliament at the 1964 general election, although his majority was cut to only 116 votes at the 1945 election. In 1937, he served as High Sheriff of Durham.

In 1952, he was made a baronet of Thorp Perrow in the North Riding of the County of York. The Thorp Perrow estate near Bedale had been bought by his father in 1927. Sir Leonard planted the 85-acre (34 ha) Thorp Perrow Arboretum.

== Sources ==
- Craig, F. W. S. (1983) [1969]. British parliamentary election results 1918-1949 (3rd ed.). Chichester: Parliamentary Research Services. ISBN 0-900178-06-X.
- Leigh Rayment's list of baronets
- Leigh Rayment's Historical List of MPs

Parliament of the United Kingdom
Preceded by John Herriotts	Member of Parliament for Sedgefield; 1923–1929	Succeeded by John Herriotts
Preceded by George Lane-Fox	Member of Parliament for Barkston Ash; 1931–1964	Succeeded by Michael Alison
Baronetage of the United Kingdom
New creation	Baronet (of Thorp Perrow); 1952–1977	Succeeded by John Ropner
