= Adele Meyer =

English socialite, social reformer and philanthropist

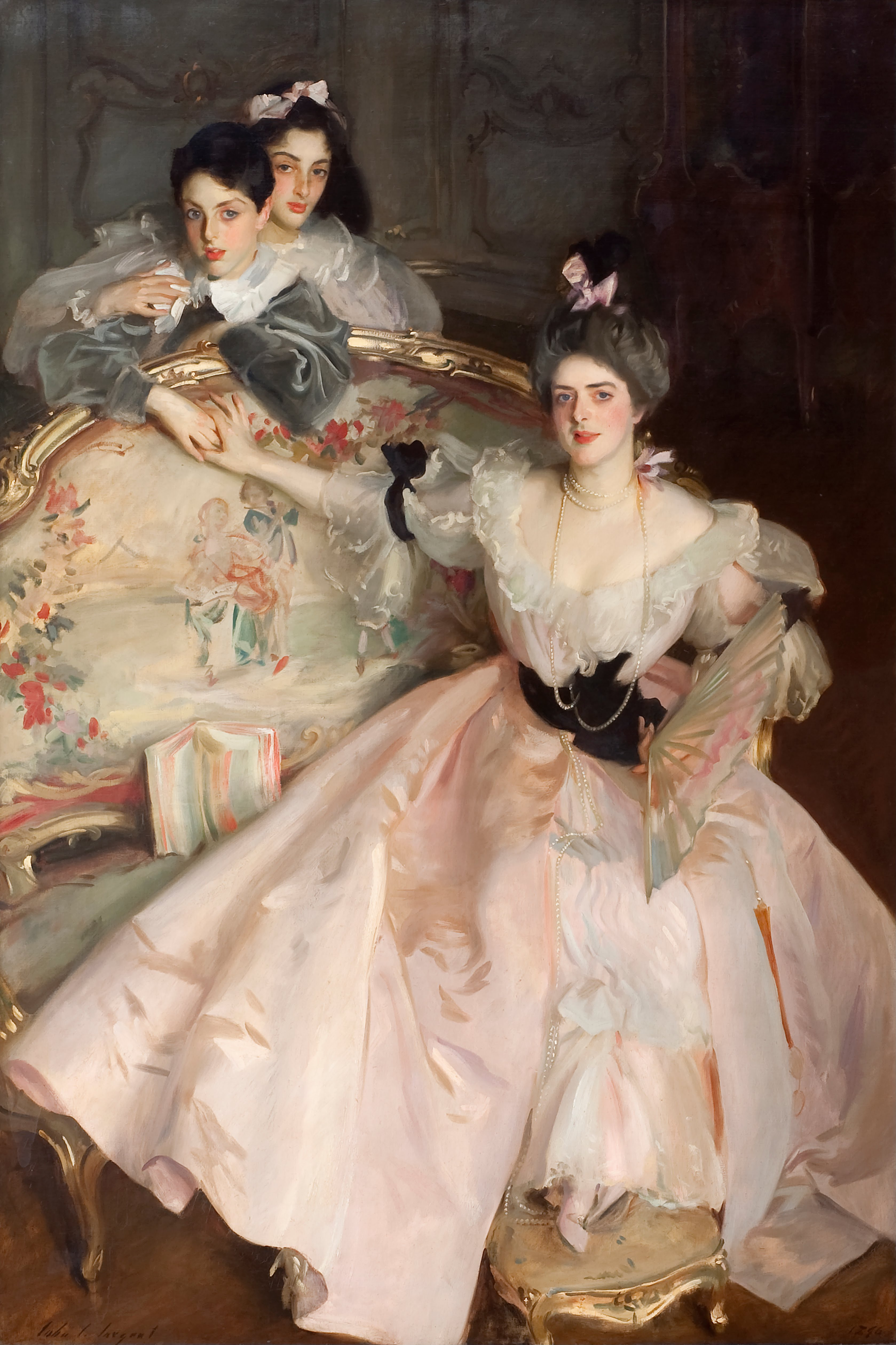
- "Mrs. Carl Meyer and her Children" by John Singer Sargent
- Born: Adele Levis; 1855; London
- Died: 1930 (aged 74–75)
- Spouse: Sir Carl Meyer
- Children: two

Adele Meyer, Lady Meyer (née Levis; 1855–1930) was an English socialite, social reformer and philanthropist. She was a suffragist and active supporter of the Women's Tax Resistance League (WTRL), the members of which protested against the disenfranchisement of women by refusing to pay taxes.

Born in Belsize Park, London, Adele was the eldest daughter of the merchant Julius Levis. Her family was Jewish, but nothing else is known of her life until she married the wealthy banker Carl Ferdinand Meyer (1851–1922) in 1883. Her husband's association with the merchant banking house of Rothschilds brought the couple into contact with the great and the good of the day, but her new life as a social hostess was insufficient for Adele, who became Lady Meyer when her husband was created a baronet in 1910.

Adele and her husband were art collectors and enthusiastic patrons of the opera, but in 1910 she described herself as "a humble social worker".

== Life ==
Adele Meyer was born in Belsize Park in London in 1855 into a Jewish family. She married the wealthy banker Carl Meyer in 1883. She described herself as a social worker and visited the poor; she was a patron of the opera.

Adele Meyer and her two children were models for a portrait by the American painter John Singer Sargent. The painting shows her in luxurious surroundings with her son Frank and daughter Elsie Charlotte. It was exhibited in 1897.

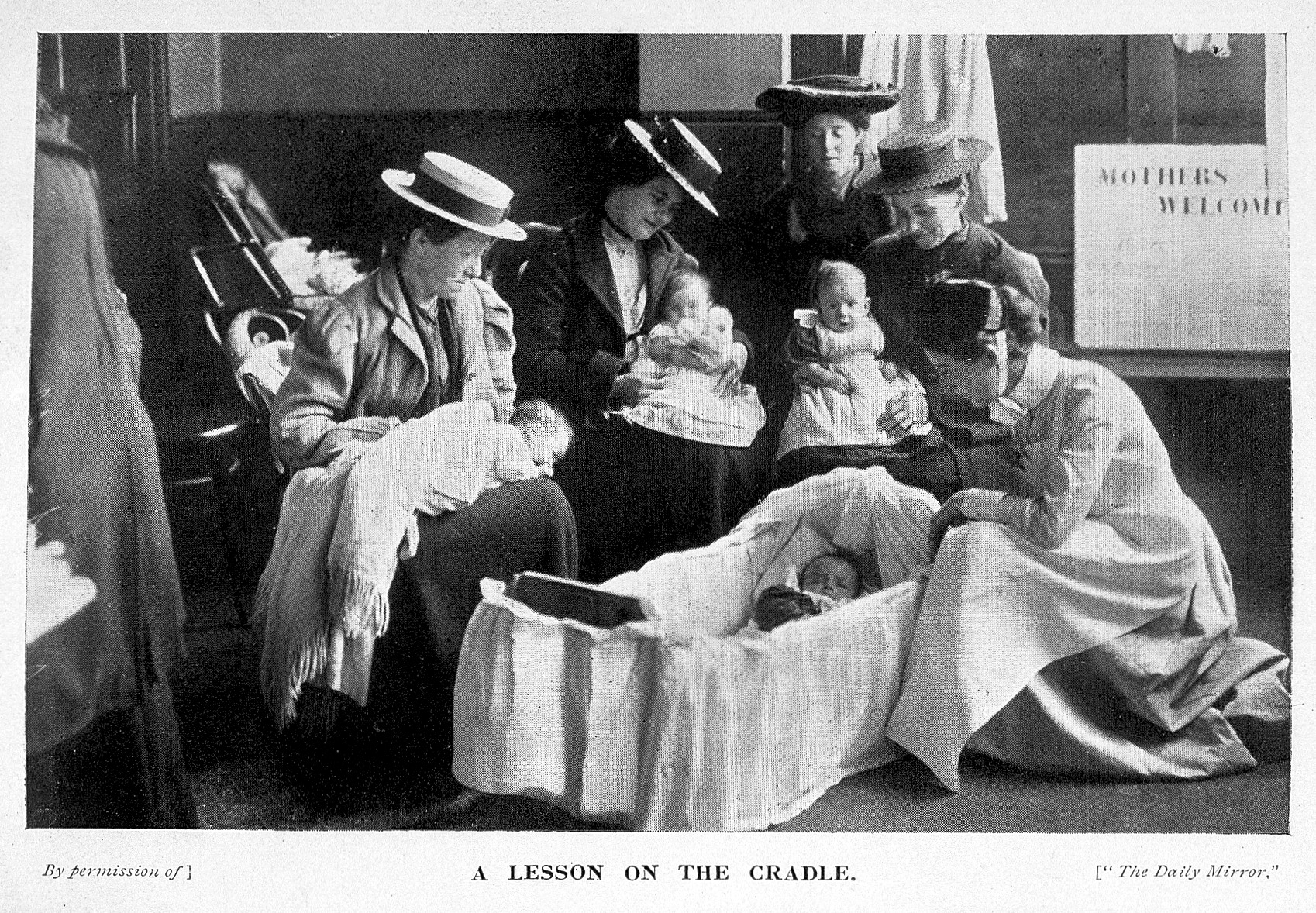
A lesson on the cradle at a School for Mothers

Adele was a benefactor and chair of the St. Pancras School for Mothers, commonly known as the Mothers' and Babies' Welcome. Formed in 1907, its aim was to improve the infant mortality rate, which at the time was about 15 per cent in that part of London by, among other things, providing basic medical advice and cooking lessons for women in their own homes. Meyer served as its vice-chair alongside Alys Pearsall Smith. This provided a model for infant welfare centres, bring together a range of services focused towards reducing infant mortality. In 1910 she founded a similar institution near her estate in Newport, Essex, the Village Medical Centre, the first such rural health centre in the country. She was also one of the founders of Queen Mary's Hostel for Women.

As a member of the Anti-Sweating League, along with fellow member Clementina Black, Adele organised and funded a study into the working conditions of London women employed in the unregulated tailoring and dressmaking industries. Their report, Makers of our Clothes, Being the Results of a Year's Investigation into the Work of Women in London in the Tailoring, Dressmaking and Underclothing Trades, appeared in 1909. It concluded that the rates of pay were so low that women were forced to work almost around the clock, leaving them no time to care for their families "If there is any immediate means by which legislation might diminish the evil of underpayment, it is the highest time that legislation should intervene in aid of a law-abiding, industrious, and greatly oppressed, class of citizens." Regulation was introduced in the Trade Board Act 1909, in which procedures were laid out for setting minimum wages.

== Later life and death ==
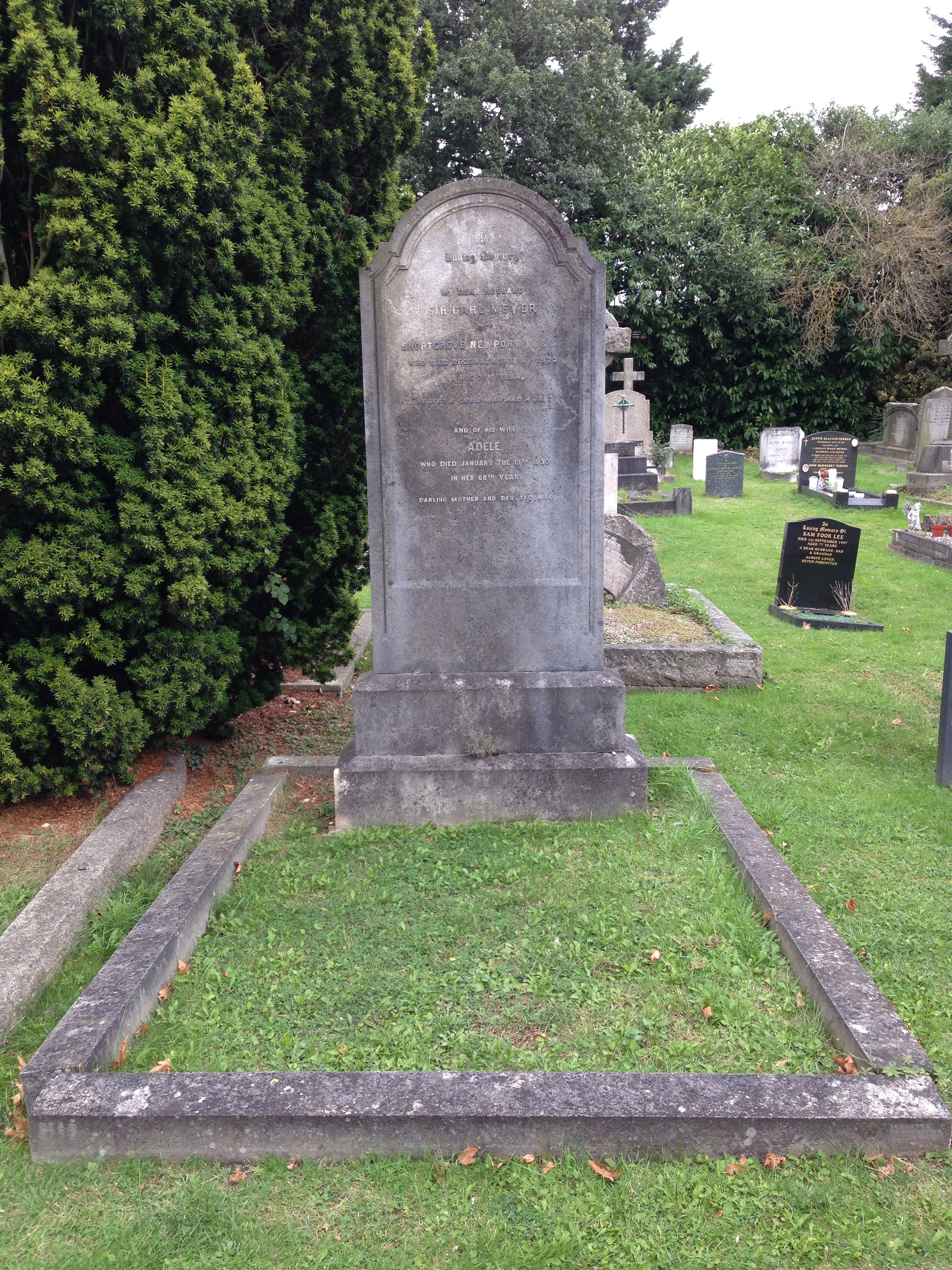
The grave of Adele and Carl Meyer at East Finchley Cemetery in 2016

She was a founder and funder of the Queen Mary's Hostel for Women in London; this became Queen Mary College. After her husband's death in 1922 Adele served on the committee of the Shakespeare Memorial National Theatre, which became the Royal National Theatre, London in 1963. The Meyers "drifted from Judaism", and Adele and her husband were both buried as Christians. She died of heart failure at her home in Kent, Chipstead Place, on 17 January 1930. Her estate at probate was valued at £86,109 13s 6d. £86,109 in 1930 equates to approximately equivalent to £4,866,320 in 2025, according to calculations based on Consumer Price Index measure of inflation.

== Sources ==
- Kelly, Serena (2014). "Meyer [née Levis], Adele, Lady Meyer (1862/3–1930)". Oxford Dictionary of National Biography (online ed.). Oxford University Press. doi:10.1093/ref:odnb/58576. (Subscription, Wikipedia Library access or UK public library membership required.)
- "London's Pulse: Medical Officer of Health reports 1848–1972". Wellcome Library.
- "Mrs Carl Meyer and her Children". JSSGallery. Archived from the original on 3 March 2016.
- Ross, Ellen (2007). Slum Travelers: Ladies and London Poverty, 1860-1920. University of California Press. ISBN 978-0-520-24905-9.
- Rubinstein, William D.; Jolles, Michael; Rubinstein, Hilary L. (2011). The Palgrave Dictionary of Anglo-Jewish History. Basingstoke, Hampshire: Palgrave Macmillan. ISBN 978-1-4039-3910-4.
- Vernon, James (2009). Hunger: A Modern History. Cambridge, MA: Harvard University Press. ISBN 978-0-674-04467-8.
