= Sinclair Charles Wood =

Sinclair Charles Wood OBE (c. 1897 – 26 July 1984), was a British Advertising Director and a Liberal Party politician.

== Background ==
Wood was educated at Cheltenham Grammar School. He married Betty. In the 1944 New Year Honours, he was appointed Officer of the Order of the British Empire (OBE). In 1945 he was awarded the Legion of Merit by the President of USA.

== World War One ==
He served in the British Army from 1914 to 1919.

== Professional career ==
After starting out as a journalist Wood became a city advertising specialist. He was an authority on market research and the marketing problems of industry. He was managing director of the British Export Trade Advertising Corporation. He was managing director of Pritchard Wood and Partners.

== World War Two ==
In 1940 Wood joined the Royal Air Force Volunteer Reserve. He was a radar operator on a close-support radar unit and saw service in Africa, Malta, Sicily and Italy. He was appointed assistant director of Organisation at the Air Ministry, with the rank of acting Wing-Commander.

== Political career ==
He was elected to Wycombe Rural District Council. He was first Treasurer and then Chairman of the Home Counties Liberal Federation. He was a member of the Liberal Party Council and of the party National Executive. He was chairman of the party publicity committee. He was selected by Reading Liberal Association to be their candidate for the 1945 General Election but he withdrew and did not contest the elections. He was Liberal candidate for the Eton and Slough constituency in Buckinghamshire at the 1950 General Election. He came third in a four-way contest;

General Election 1950: Eton and Slough
Party	Candidate	Votes	%	±%
Labour	Archibald Fenner Brockway	19,987	48.5	+3.0
Conservative	Edward Charles Cobb	15,594	37.8	−3.4
Liberal	Sinclair Charles Wood	5,026	12.2	−1.1
Communist	P. L. N. Smith	614	1.5	N/A
Majority		4,393	10.7	+6.4
Turnout		41,221	85.7	+13.8
Labour hold		Swing		

He did not stand for parliament again.
