= West Flintshire =

UK Parliament constituency (1950–1983)

- Former county constituency for the House of Commons
- Preserved county: 1960–1974: Flintshire; 1974–1983: Clwyd

1950–1983
- Seats: One
- Created from: Flintshire
- Replaced by: Delyn and Clwyd North West

West Flintshire was a parliamentary constituency in Flintshire, North Wales. It returned one Member of Parliament (MP) to the House of Commons of the Parliament of the United Kingdom.

The constituency was created for the 1950 general election, and abolished for the 1983 general election.

== Boundaries ==
The Urban Districts of Mold, Prestatyn, and Rhyl, and the Rural Districts of Holywell and St Asaph.

== Members of Parliament ==
Election	Member	Party
1950	Nigel Birch	Conservative
1970	Sir Anthony Meyer	Conservative
1983	constituency abolished	

== Election results ==
=== Elections in the 1950s ===
General election 1950: West Flintshire
Party	Candidate	Votes	%	±%
Conservative	Nigel Birch	19,088	48.3	
Labour	David V Leadbeater	12,369	31.3	
Liberal	William Armon Ellis	8,036	20.4	
Majority		6,719	17.0	
Turnout		39,493	86.7	
Conservative win (new seat)				

General election 1951: West Flintshire
Party	Candidate	Votes	%	±%
Conservative	Nigel Birch	23,433	60.8	+12.5
Labour	David V Leadbeater	15,118	39.2	+7.9
Majority		8,315	21.6	+4.6
Turnout		38,751	83.2	−3.5
Conservative hold		Swing	+2.3	

General election 1955: West Flintshire
Party	Candidate	Votes	%	±%
Conservative	Nigel Birch	20,980	55.7	−5.1
Labour	Hywel J Jones	12,628	33.5	−5.7
Liberal	Gomer Owen	4,060	10.8	New
Majority		8,352	22.2	+0.6
Turnout		37,668	81.0	−2.2
Conservative hold		Swing	+0.3	

General election 1959: West Flintshire
Party	Candidate	Votes	%	±%
Conservative	Nigel Birch	20,446	52.1	−3.6
Labour	Ronald Waterhouse	12,925	32.9	−0.6
Liberal	Llewelyn Emyr Roberts	4,319	11.0	+0.2
Plaid Cymru	Ernest Nefyl C Williams	1,594	4.1	New
Majority		7,521	19.2	−3.0
Turnout		39,284	82.7	+1.7
Conservative hold		Swing	-1.5	

=== Elections in the 1960s ===
General election 1964: West Flintshire
Party	Candidate	Votes	%	±%
Conservative	Nigel Birch	18,515	45.7	−6.4
Labour	William H Edwards	13,298	32.8	−0.1
Liberal	Martin Thomas	7,482	18.5	+7.5
Plaid Cymru	Ernest Nefyl C Williams	1,195	3.0	−1.1
Majority		5,217	12.9	−6.3
Turnout		39,284	80.8	−1.9
Conservative hold		Swing	-3.2	

General election 1966: West Flintshire
Party	Candidate	Votes	%	±%
Conservative	Nigel Birch	18,179	43.2	−2.5
Labour	Tom Ellis	15,137	36.0	+3.2
Liberal	Martin Thomas	7,137	17.0	−1.5
Plaid Cymru	D Alun Lloyd	1,585	3.8	+0.8
Majority		3,042	7.2	−5.7
Turnout		42,038	81.9	+1.1
Conservative hold		Swing	-2.9	

=== Elections in the 1970s ===
General election 1970: West Flintshire
Party	Candidate	Votes	%	±%
Conservative	Anthony Meyer	20,999	46.5	+3.3
Labour	John G. Evans	13,655	30.2	−5.8
Liberal	Martin Thomas	7,437	16.5	−0.5
Plaid Cymru	Alun Ogwen Jones	3,108	6.9	+3.1
Majority		7,344	16.3	+9.1
Turnout		45,199	77.8	−4.1
Conservative hold		Swing		

General election February 1974: West Flintshire
Party	Candidate	Votes	%	±%
Conservative	Anthony Meyer	22,039	42.33	
Labour	NB Harries	14,897	28.61	
Liberal	P Brighton	12,831	24.65	
Plaid Cymru	G Hughes	2,296	4.41	
Majority		7,142	13.72	
Turnout		52,063	81.53	
Conservative hold		Swing		

General election October 1974: West Flintshire
Party	Candidate	Votes	%	±%
Conservative	Anthony Meyer	20,054	41.37	
Labour	NB Harries	15,234	31.43	
Liberal	PJ Brighton	10,881	22.45	
Plaid Cymru	N Taylor	2,306	4.76	
Majority		4,820	9.94	
Turnout		48,475	75.39	
Conservative hold		Swing		

General election 1979: West Flintshire
Party	Candidate	Votes	%	±%
Conservative	Anthony Meyer	26,364	49.0	+7.6
Labour	RM Hughes	16,678	31.0	−0.4
Liberal	John Parry	9,009	16.7	−5.7
Plaid Cymru	BM Edwards	1,720	3.2	−1.6
Majority		9,686	18.0	+8.1
Turnout		53,771	78.6	+3.2
Conservative hold		Swing		
