= Eton and Slough =

Parliamentary constituency in the United Kingdom 1945-1983

- Former borough constituency for the House of Commons
- Boundary of Eton and Slough in Buckinghamshire, boundaries 1974–83
- County: Buckinghamshire

1950–1983
- Seats: One
- Replaced by: Slough, and Windsor and Maidenhead

1945–1950
- Seats: One
- Type of constituency: County constituency
- Created from: Wycombe

Eton and Slough was a parliamentary constituency represented in the House of Commons of the Parliament of the United Kingdom. It elected one Member of Parliament (MP) by the first-past-the-post voting system.

== History ==
The House of Commons (Redistribution of Seats) Act 1944 set up Boundaries Commissions to carry out periodic reviews of the distribution of parliamentary constituencies. It also authorised an initial review to subdivide abnormally large constituencies in time for the 1945 election. This was implemented by the Redistribution of Seats Order 1945 under which Buckinghamshire was allocated an additional seat. As a consequence, the new County Constituency of Eton and Slough was formed from the Wycombe constituency, comprising the Municipal Borough of Slough and the Urban and Rural Districts of Eton.

The constituency had some nationally known MPs: Fenner Brockway was a noted internationalist; Anthony Meyer, who later became MP for a constituency in Flintshire, Wales, challenged Prime Minister Margaret Thatcher as a "stalking horse" leadership candidate in 1989; and Joan Lestor, who later served as MP for Eccles, Greater Manchester, was a government minister and a founder of the anti-fascist newsletter Searchlight. The seat contained a prestigious public school (Eton College), yet had Labour MPs for most of its history, mostly because of the inclusion of the new town of Slough, which mainly voted for Labour. The sole occasion a Conservative MP won the seat, in 1964, it was represented by an Old Etonian, Anthony Meyer.

== Boundaries and boundary changes ==
=== 1945–1950 ===
Eton and Slough was established as a county division of the administrative county of Buckinghamshire. It comprised the southernmost part of that county, consisting of:

- The Municipal Borough of Slough;
- The Urban District of Eton; and
- The Rural District of Eton.

=== 1950–1983 ===
Under the Representation of the People Act 1948, Eton and Slough became a borough constituency. The Municipal Borough of Slough and the Eton Urban District were retained, but Eton Rural District was transferred to the new South Buckinghamshire constituency. There were no changes to the boundaries at the First or Second Periodic Reviews of Westminster constituencies.

There were considerable changes in English local government in 1974 with the areas forming the constituency being transferred from Buckinghamshire to Berkshire. However, there were no changes to parliamentary boundaries until 1983. In that year the constituency was abolished, with Eton becoming part of the Windsor and Maidenhead seat and Slough forming the new Slough constituency.

== Members of Parliament ==
Election	Member	Party
1945	Benn Levy	Labour
1950	Fenner Brockway	Labour
1964	Sir Anthony Meyer	Conservative
1966	Joan Lestor	Labour
1983	constituency abolished	

== Elections ==
=== Elections in the 1940s ===
General election 1945: Eton and Slough
Party	Candidate	Votes	%	±%
Labour	Benn Levy	25,711	45.5	
Conservative	Edward Cobb	23,287	41.2	
Liberal	Aubrey Ward	7,487	13.3	
Majority		2,424	4.3	
Turnout		56,485	71.9	
Registered electors		78,512		
Labour win (new seat)				

=== Elections in the 1950s ===
General election 1950: Eton and Slough
Party	Candidate	Votes	%
Labour	Fenner Brockway	19,987	48.5
Conservative	Edward Cobb	15,594	37.8
Liberal	Sinclair Charles Wood	5,026	12.2
Communist	Peter Smith	614	1.5
Majority		4,393	10.7
Turnout		41,221	85.7
Registered electors		48,401	
Labour hold			

- This constituency underwent boundary changes between the 1945 and 1950 general elections and thus calculation of change in vote share is not meaningful.

General election 1951: Eton and Slough
Party	Candidate	Votes	%	±%
Labour	Fenner Brockway	22,732	55.0	+6.5
Conservative	Victor R Rees	18,648	45.0	+7.2
Majority		4,084	10.0	−0.7
Turnout		41,380	84.3	−1.4
Registered electors		49,071		
Labour hold		Swing		

General election 1955: Eton and Slough
Party	Candidate	Votes	%	±%
Labour	Fenner Brockway	20,567	53.2	−1.8
Conservative	John Grant	18,124	46.8	+1.8
Majority		2,443	6.4	−3.6
Turnout		38,691	79.8	−4.5
Registered electors		48,459		
Labour hold		Swing	-1.8	

General election 1959: Eton and Slough
Party	Candidate	Votes	%	±%
Labour	Fenner Brockway	20,851	50.1	−3.1
Conservative	John Page	20,763	49.9	+3.1
Majority		88	0.21	−6.2
Turnout		41,614	79.9	+0.1
Registered electors		52,114		
Labour hold		Swing	-3.1	

=== Elections in the 1960s ===
General election 1964: Eton and Slough
Party	Candidate	Votes	%	±%
Conservative	Anthony Meyer	22,681	50.1	+0.2
Labour	Fenner Brockway	22,670	49.9	−0.2
Majority		11	0.2	N/A
Turnout		45,351	80.0	+0.1
Registered electors		56,725		
Conservative gain from Labour		Swing	+0.1	

General election 1966: Eton and Slough
Party	Candidate	Votes	%	±%
Labour	Joan Lestor	26,553	54.8	+4.9
Conservative	Anthony Meyer	21,890	45.2	−4.9
Majority		4,663	9.6	N/A
Turnout		48,443	85.3	+5.3
Registered electors		56,795		
Labour gain from Conservative		Swing	+4.9	

=== Elections in the 1970s ===
General election 1970: Eton and Slough
Party	Candidate	Votes	%	±%
Labour	Joan Lestor	24,103	49.2	−5.6
Conservative	Nigel Lawson	21,436	43.8	−1.4
Liberal	Peter G. D. Naylor	3,407	7.0	New
Majority		2,667	5.4	−4.2
Turnout		48,946	77.9	−7.4
Registered electors		62,875		
Labour hold		Swing	-1.5	

General election February 1974: Eton and Slough
Party	Candidate	Votes	%	±%
Labour	Joan Lestor	22,919	45.0	−4.2
Conservative	S. Dolland	16,028	31.5	−12.3
Liberal	Philip Goldenberg	10,051	19.8	+12.8
National Front	A. P. Coniam	1,541	3.0	New
Ind. Conservative	S. H. Crevald	344	0.7	New
Majority		6,891	13.5	+8.1
Turnout		50,883	80.6	+2.7
Registered electors		63,167		
Labour hold		Swing		

General election October 1974: Eton and Slough
Party	Candidate	Votes	%	±%
Labour	Joan Lestor	22,238	47.9	+2.9
Conservative	S. Dolland	14,575	31.4	−0.1
Liberal	Philip Goldenberg	8,213	17.7	−2.1
National Front	A. P. Coniam	1,241	2.7	−0.3
Independent	John E. Renton	120	0.3	New
Majority		7,663	16.5	+3.0
Turnout		46,387	72.7	−7.9
Registered electors		63,794		
Labour hold		Swing		

General election 1979: Eton and Slough
Party	Candidate	Votes	%	±%
Labour	Joan Lestor	20,710	42.6	−5.3
Conservative	Christopher Ward	19,370	39.8	+8.4
Liberal	Philip Goldenberg	5,254	10.8	−6.9
Ind. Conservative	George Brooker	2,359	4.9	New
National Front	D. Jones	943	1.9	−0.8
Majority		1,340	2.8	−13.7
Turnout		48,636	74.9	+2.2
Registered electors		64,916		
Labour hold		Swing		
