= Paul Howell (MP) =

British Conservative politician

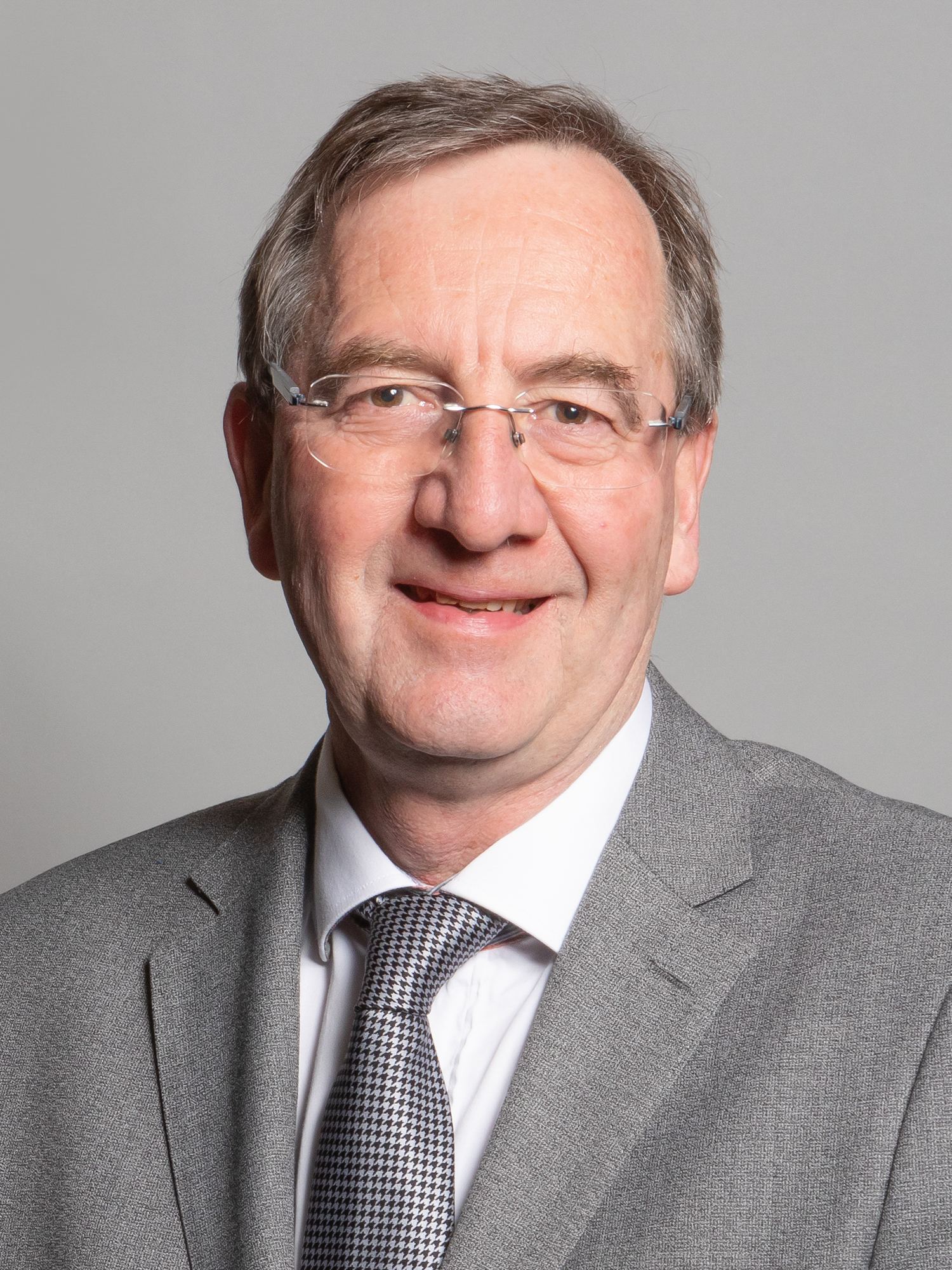
- Official portrait, 2020

Member of Parliament for Sedgefield
- In office 12 December 2019 – 30 May 2024
- Preceded by: Phil Wilson
- Succeeded by: Constituency Abolished

Member of Durham County Council for Aycliffe North and Middridge
- In office 4 May 2017 – 6 May 2021 Serving with Scott Durham; John Clare
- Preceded by: Joan Gray; John Clare; Mike Dixon
- Succeeded by: David Sutton-Lloyd; Michael Stead; Tony Stubbs

Personal details
- Born: 10 January 1960 (age 66) Bishop Auckland, County Durham, England
- Party: Conservative

Paul Howell (born 10 January 1960) is a British Conservative Party politician who was the Member of Parliament (MP) for Sedgefield from 2019 until 2024. Prior to his political career, he was an accountant.

== Early life and career ==
Paul Howell was born on 10 January 1960 in Bishop Auckland Hospital in County Durham. He was raised in Ferryhill and Newton Aycliffe and attended Dean Bank and Sugar Hill primary schools and The Avenue Comprehensive School. His father was a divisional fire officer. He has a Master of Business Administration degree from Durham University. After leaving school, he worked as a chartered accountant for firms such as Darchem, Blue Circle Industries, and Wilsonart.

== Political career ==
Howell joined the Conservative Party in 2010. He was a councillor for Hummersknott ward on the Darlington Borough Council between 2019 and 2021. He was also a councillor for Aycliffe North and Middridge on the Durham County Council between 2017 and 2021.

Howell unsuccessfully contested Houghton and Sunderland South at the 2017 general election, coming second with 29.7% of the vote behind the incumbent Labour MP Bridget Phillipson.

At the 2019 general election, Howell was elected as MP for Sedgefield with 47.2% of the vote and a majority of 4,513 over incumbent Labour MP Phil Wilson. The area of the constituency had been represented by Labour Party MPs since the 1935 general election. Wilson's immediate predecessor in representing the constituency, former Prime Minister Tony Blair, did so between 1983 and 2007.

Howell was a member of the Transport Select Committee from November 2022 and was a member of the Business, Energy and Industrial Strategy Committee between March 2020 and October 2022. On 14 June 2022, Howell became a Parliamentary private secretary in the Department for Environment, Food and Rural Affairs.

In October 2023, he announced he was seeking nomination as the Conservative candidate for the newly created Mayor of the North East. He was unsuccessful in securing the nomination.

== Post-parliamentary career ==
In 2024 he stood unsuccessfully in Newton Aycliffe and Spennymoor, a successor to his Sedgefield seat, and was pushed into third place behind Labour and Reform UK with 20.6% of the vote. Following his defeat at the 2024 UK general election, Howell updated his LinkedIn profile to say he would be "resting" for four months. Howell has subsequently begun working as a freelance public affairs consultant.

In 2025, Howell stood unsuccessfully for election as a Councillor in the Aycliffe South ward in County Durham, achieving fifth place with 589 votes.

== Personal life ==
Howell owns a property portfolio consisting of nine houses in Darlington, five houses in Durham, and two flats in County Durham.

Parliament of the United Kingdom
| Preceded by Phil Wilson | Member of Parliament for Sedgefield; 2019–2024 | Constituency abolished |
