= John Herriotts =

English politician (1874–1935)

John Herriotts MP
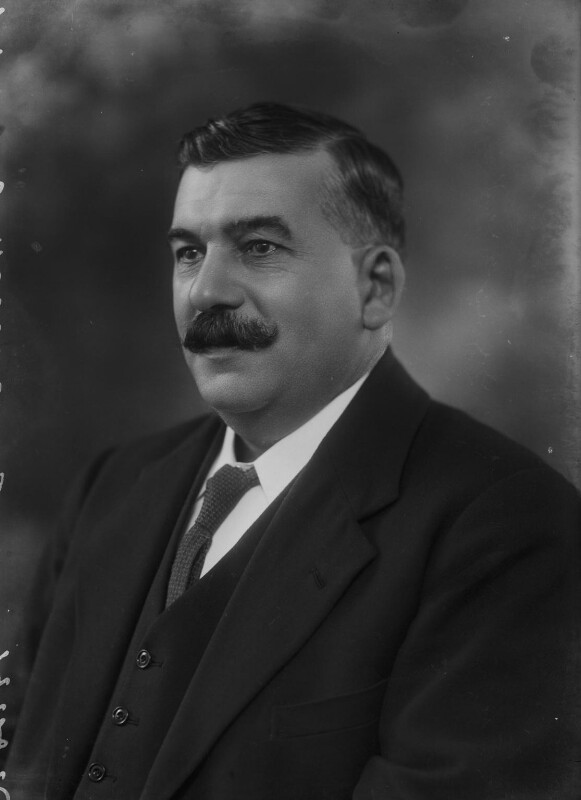
- Herriotts in 1931

Member of Parliament for Sedgefield
- In office 15 November 1922 – 6 December 1923
- Preceded by: Rowland Burdon
- Succeeded by: Leonard Ropner
- Majority: 689 (3.1%)
- In office 30 May 1929 – 27 October 1931
- Preceded by: Leonard Ropner
- Succeeded by: Roland Jennings
- Majority: 2,706 (8.2%)

Personal details
- Born: John Herriotts; 13 September 1874 Tredegar, England
- Died: 27 June 1935 (aged 60)
- Party: Labour

John Herriotts (13 September 1874 – 27 June 1935) was a Labour Party politician in the United Kingdom.

Born in Tredegar, in Monmouthshire, Herriotts moved to County Durham to work at the Windlestone Colliery, and was later elected as checkweighman.

Herriotts was a supporter of the Labour Party, and served on Durham County Council from 1907 to 1918. He was elected as Member of Parliament (MP) for Sedgefield in County Durham at the 1922 general election, with a majority of only 689 votes. He was defeated at the 1923 general election, losing by six votes to the Conservative Party candidate, Leonard Ropner.

Herriots stood again unsuccessfully at the 1924 election, but regained the seat at the 1929 general election. He was ousted again at the 1931 general election, this time by the Conservative Roland Jennings, and did not stand again. However, he did win election to Sedgefield Rural District Council in 1934, serving until his death, the following year.

Parliament of the United Kingdom
Preceded by Rowland Burdon	Member of Parliament for Sedgefield; 1922–1923	Succeeded by Leonard Ropner
Preceded by Leonard Ropner	Member of Parliament for Sedgefield; 1929–1931	Succeeded by Roland Jennings
