= Assistant Postmaster-General =

The Assistant Postmaster General is a defunct junior ministerial position in the United Kingdom Government.

The title of Postmaster General was abolished under the Post Office Act 1969. A new public authority governed by a chairman was established under the name of the "Post Office". The position of "Postmaster General" was replaced with Minister of Posts and Telecommunications and that of Assistant Postmaster General was replaced by a Parliamentary Secretary post.

== Assistant Postmasters General ==
- January 1910: Henry Norman
- 1910: Cecil Norton
- 1915: Herbert Pike Pease
- 1922: vacant
- 1924: Roundell Palmer, Viscount Wolmer
- 1929: Samuel Viant
- 1931: Graham White
- 1932: Sir Ernest Bennett
- 1935: Sir Walter Womersley
- 1939: William Mabane
- 1939: Charles Waterhouse
- 1941: Allan Chapman
- 1942: Robert Grimston
- 1945: William Anstruther-Gray
- 1945: Wilfrid Burke
- 1947: Charles Rider Hobson
- 1951: Leonard David Gammans
- 1955: Cuthbert Alport
- 1957: Kenneth Thompson
- 1959: Mervyn Pike
- 1963: Raymond Llewellyn Mawby
- 1964: Joseph Slater

== Parliamentary Secretaries to the Minister of Posts and Telecommunications ==
- 1969: Joseph Slater
- 1969: Norman Pentland
