= Clwyd North West =

UK Parliament constituency (1983–1997)

- Former county constituency for the House of Commons
- Preserved county: Clwyd
- Major settlements: Abergele, Colwyn Bay, Rhyl

1983–1997
- Seats: One
- Created from: Denbigh and West Flintshire
- Replaced by: Clwyd West and Vale of Clwyd

Clwyd North West (Welsh: Clwyd Gogledd-orllewin) was a parliamentary constituency in Clwyd, North Wales. It returned one Member of Parliament (MP) to the House of Commons of the Parliament of the United Kingdom by the first past the post system.

== History ==
The constituency was created for the 1983 general election, and abolished for the 1997 general election.

From 1983 to 1992, it was represented by Conservative MP Anthony Meyer, who unsuccessfully tried to challenge the leadership of prime minister Margaret Thatcher in late 1989. As a result, he was de-selected by fellow Conservative MPs as the party's candidate for the next general election, which was ultimately held on 9 April 1992 and saw the Tories hold the seat with new MP Rod Richards.

== Boundaries ==
The constituency covered a section of the North Wales coast that stretched between the resort towns of Colwyn Bay and Rhyl.

== Members of Parliament ==
Election	Member	Party
1983	Anthony Meyer	Conservative
1992	Rod Richards	Conservative
1997	constituency abolished: see Clwyd West & Vale of Clwyd	

== Elections ==
=== Elections in the 1980s ===
General election 1983: Clwyd North West
Party	Candidate	Votes	%	±%
Conservative	Anthony Meyer	23,283	51.0	
Liberal	John Lewis	13,294	29.1	
Labour	Colin Campbell	7,433	16.3	
Plaid Cymru	Manon Rhys	1,669	3.6	
Majority		9,989	21.9	
Turnout		45,679	73.1	
Conservative win (new seat)				

General election 1987: Clwyd North West
Party	Candidate	Votes	%	±%
Conservative	Anthony Meyer	24,116	48.5	―2.5
Labour	Thomas Lansdown	12,335	24.8	+8.5
Liberal	Owain Griffiths	11,279	22.7	―6.4
Plaid Cymru	Robert Davies	1,966	4.0	+0.4
Majority		11,781	23.7	+1.8
Turnout		49,696	75.2	+2.1
Conservative hold		Swing	―5.5	

=== Elections in the 1990s ===
General election 1992: Clwyd North West
Party	Candidate	Votes	%	±%
Conservative	Rod Richards	24,488	46.2	―2.3
Labour	Chris Ruane	18,438	34.8	+10.0
Liberal Democrats	Robert Ingham	7,999	15.1	―7.6
Plaid Cymru	Neil Taylor	1,888	3.6	―0.4
Natural Law	Mary Swift	158	0.3	New
Majority		6,050	11.4	―12.3
Turnout		52,971	78.6	+3.4
Conservative hold		Swing	―6.1	

== See also ==
- List of parliamentary constituencies in Clwyd
