= David Reed (Labour politician) =

English politician (1945–2017)

David Reed (24 April 1945 – 12 March 2017) was a Labour politician in the United Kingdom.

In 1970, he was elected at the age of 25 as Member of Parliament (MP) for Sedgefield in County Durham. However, the constituency was abolished for the February 1974 general election, and Reed did not subsequently return to Parliament. In that redistribution Sedgefield itself was transferred to the redrawn Durham constituency, which was held for Labour by Mark Hughes, who had entered parliament alongside Reed at the previous general election in 1970.

Reed subsequently had a career in journalism and public relations. From 1990 to 2005, he was Director of Corporate Communications for Whitbread.

The Sedgefield constituency was re-created in boundary changes for the 1983 general election, when future Prime Minister Tony Blair was elected as its MP.

Parliament of the United Kingdom
Preceded by Joseph Slater	Member of Parliament for Sedgefield; 1970–Feb. 1974	Constituency abolished
