= Sir Frank Meyer, 2nd Baronet =

British politician (1886–1935)

Sir Frank Meyer Bt
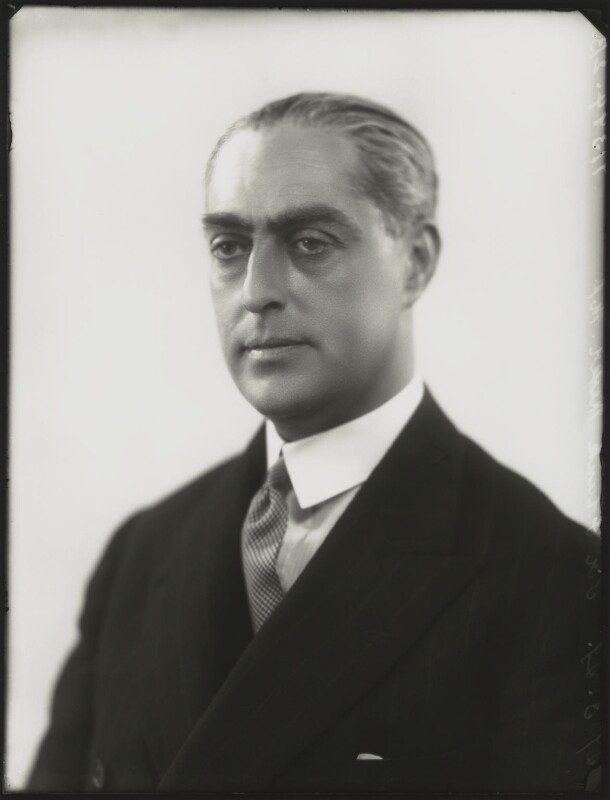
- Meyer in 1929

Member of Parliament for Great Yarmouth
- In office 29 October 1924 – 10 May 1929
- Preceded by: Arthur Harbord
- Succeeded by: Arthur Harbord

Personal details
- Born: Frank Cecil Meyer; 7 May 1886
- Died: 19 October 1935 (aged 49) Ayot St Lawrence, Hertfordshire, England
- Party: Conservative
- Children: Sir Anthony Meyer
- Parents: Sir Carl Meyer (father); Adele Meyer (mother)
- Education: New College, Oxford

Sir Frank Cecil Meyer, 2nd Baronet (7 May 1886 – 19 October 1935) was a British businessman and Conservative Party politician.

== Personal life ==
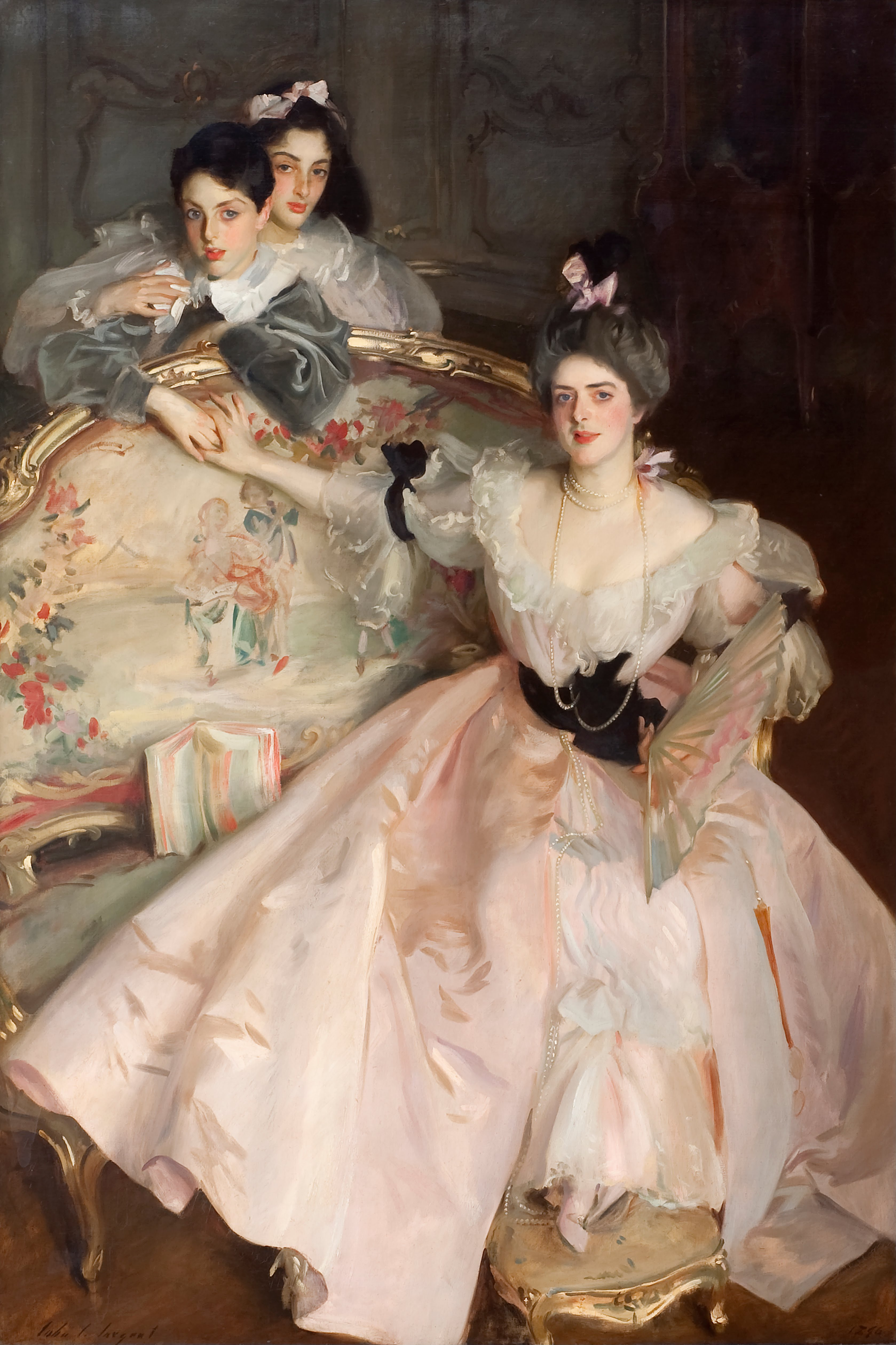
Frank Meyer with his mother and sister, painting by John Singer Sargent, 1896

The son of German-born businessman Sir Carl and Adele Meyer, Meyer was also successful in business, becoming vice-chairman of the De Beers diamond cartel. He was educated at New College, Oxford and served in the First World War with the Essex Yeomanry and the Signal Corps, being mentioned in dispatches. He was elected as MP for Great Yarmouth in 1924, but lost his seat in 1929. His son, Anthony Meyer, was also a Conservative MP. Anthony Meyer inherited his father's title at the age of fifteen when Frank Meyer died in a hunting accident at in Ayot St Lawrence, Hertfordshire.

== Career ==
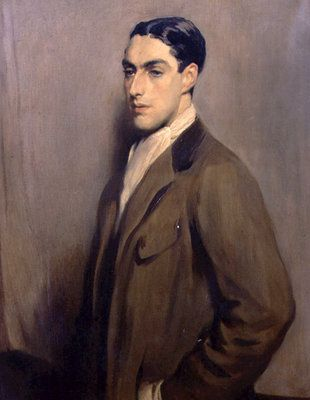
Frank Meyer, ca 1910, by Glyn Philpot

At the 1924 general election, he was elected as Member of Parliament (MP) for Great Yarmouth in Norfolk, defeating the Liberal MP Sir Arthur Harbord. Harbord retook the seat at the 1929 general election, and Meyer never re-entered Parliament.

== Arms ==
Coat of arms of Sir Frank Meyer, 2nd Baronet
Crest A cock sable armed combed and wattled Or holding in the dexter claw a key as in the arms. Escutcheon Sable a key wards downwards Or between four bezants. Motto Rast Ich Rost Ich

Parliament of the United Kingdom
Preceded by Sir Arthur Harbord	Member of Parliament for Great Yarmouth; 1924–1929	Succeeded by Sir Arthur Harbord
Baronetage of the United Kingdom
Preceded by Carl Meyer	Baronet (of Shortgrove); 1922–1935	Succeeded by Anthony Meyer
