= Sir Carl Meyer, 1st Baronet =

British banker and mining magnate

Sir Carl Meyer Bt
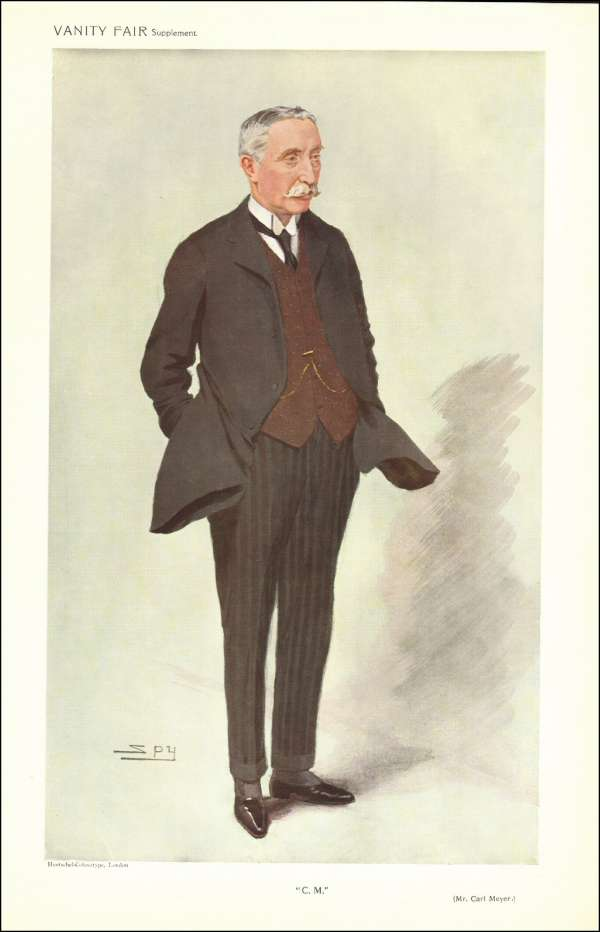
- A caricature of Meyer in Vanity Fair, 1909.
- Born: Carl Ferdinand Meyer; 23 December 1851; Free and Hanseatic City of Hamburg
- Died: 18 December 1922 (aged 70)
- Occupations: Banker, diamond miner
- Known for: Banking, mining

Sir Carl Ferdinand Meyer, 1st Baronet (23 December 1851 – 18 December 1922) was a British banker and mining magnate.

== Personal life ==
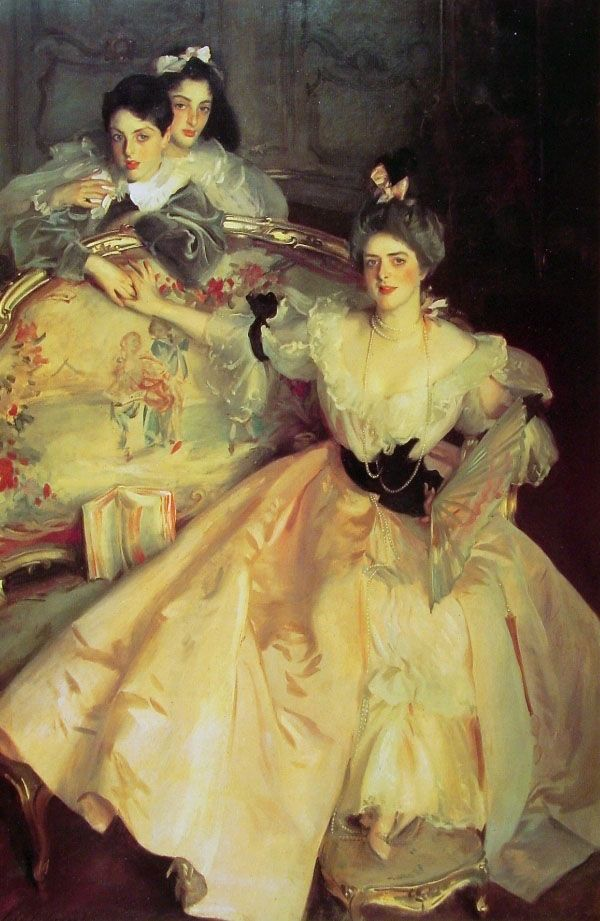
Mrs. Carl Meyer and her Children, John Singer Sargent, 1896

Meyer was born in the Free and Hanseatic City of Hamburg, in a Jewish family, the second son of Siegmund Meyer and Elise Rosa, née Hahn, daughter of Reuben Hahn. He became a naturalised British subject in 1877. In 1883 he married Adèle Levis, daughter of Julius Levis of Hampstead by which he had a son Frank Cecil Meyer and a daughter.

Adèle Levis was the subject of the portrait Mrs. Carl Meyer and her Children, 1896, by John Singer Sargent.

== Career ==
Meyer worked at first for the Rothschild family as their chief clerk and negotiator with the De Beers mining group. He then went on to work for De Beers and became deputy chairman of the company. He was also governor of the National Bank of Egypt, and member of the board of numerous other mining companies. He was also a board member of the Hong Kong and Shanghai Bank (HSBC). He was given the title of baronet in 1910.

Meyer had a great interest in the arts, constantly showing support for opera, music and the theatre. In 1909 he donated 70,000 pounds to the Shakespeare National Memorial Theatre, now rebuilt as the Royal Shakespeare Theatre in Stratford-upon-Avon. During World War I, Meyer wrote to The Times expressing his disapproval of the tactics used by the Germans in the war, including the sinking of the RMS Lusitania, prompted by a suggestion by Sir Arthur Wing Pinero that Britons of German origin should speak out publicly.

== Arms ==
Coat of arms of Sir Carl Meyer, 1st Baronet
Crest A cock sable armed combed and wattled Or holding in the dexter claw a key as in the arms. Escutcheon Sable a key wards downwards Or between four bezants. Motto Rast Ich Rost Ich (German: "If I rest, I rust")

== Notes ==
Baronetage of the United Kingdom
New creation	Baronet (of Shortgrove); 1910–1922	Succeeded by Frank Meyer
