= Phil Wilson, Baron Wilson of Sedgefield =

British politician (born 1959)

The Right Honourable The Lord Wilson of Sedgefield
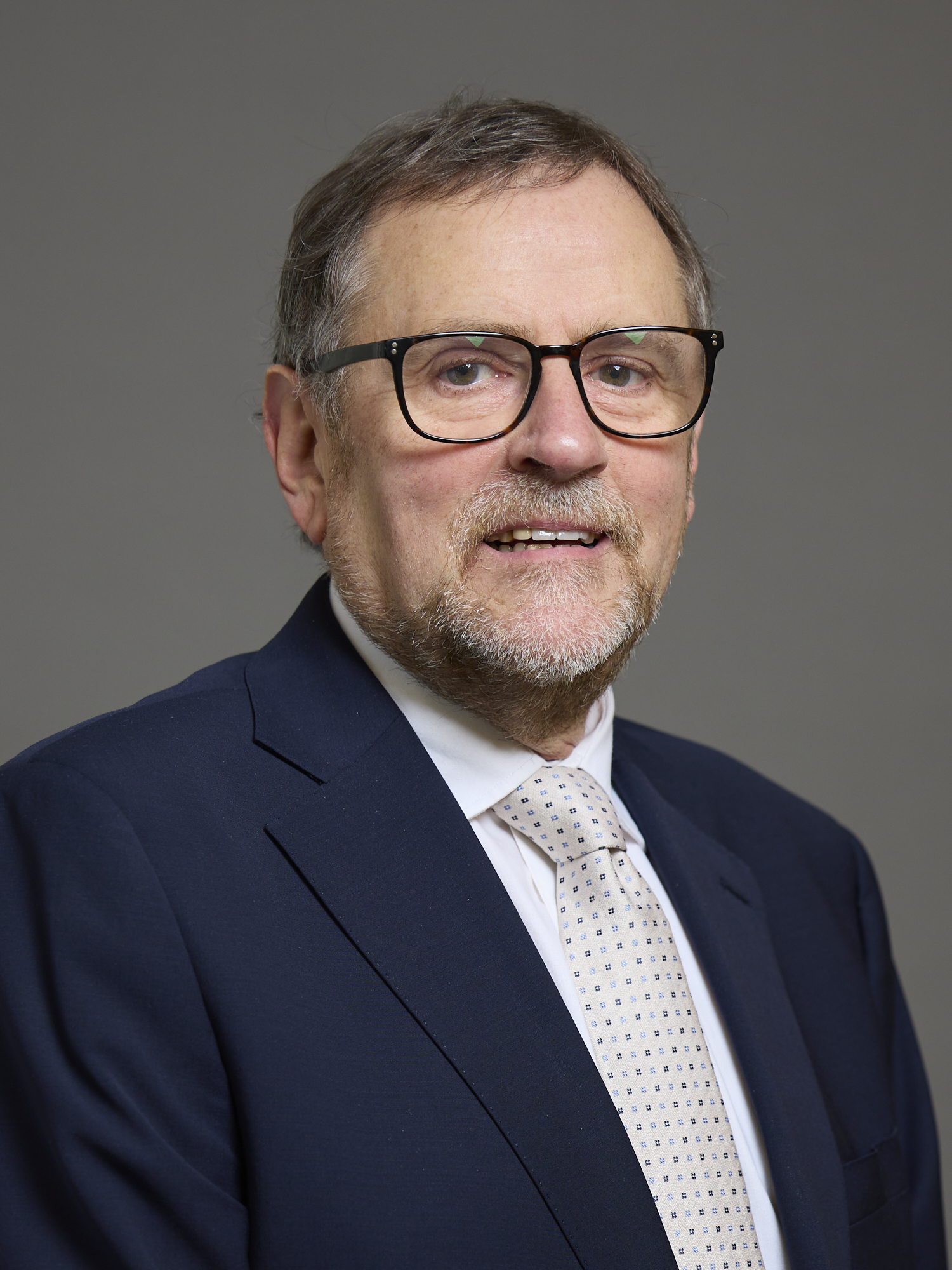
- Official portrait, 2025

Lord-in-waiting Government Whip
- Incumbent
- Assumed office 10 February 2025
- Prime Minister: Keir Starmer; Andy Burnham

Member of the House of Lords
- Lord Temporal
- Life peerage 16 January 2025

Member of Parliament for Sedgefield
- In office 19 July 2007 – 6 November 2019
- Preceded by: Tony Blair
- Succeeded by: Paul Howell

Personal details
- Born: Philip Wilson; 31 May 1959 (age 67) County Durham, England
- Party: Labour

Philip Wilson, Baron Wilson of Sedgefield (born 31 May 1959), is a British politician who served as Member of Parliament (MP) for Sedgefield from a 2007 by-election until 2019. A member of the Labour Party, he was appointed to the House of Lords as a life peer in 2024.

== Early life and career ==
The son of a Fishburn colliery worker, Wilson has lived in the Sedgefield constituency all of his life. After attending Trimdon Secondary Modern and Sedgefield Comprehensive School, Wilson became a shop assistant before moving on to be a clerical worker in the civil service where he was a lay-trade union official. Wilson later worked as a gambling lobbyist for the Gala Coral Group in the lead up to the passing of the 2005 Gambling Act, and as a director at London based public affairs consultancy Fellows' Associates.

Wilson is known for being one of the "Famous Five", a group of local Labour Party members who helped a young Tony Blair get selected as the Labour candidate for Sedgefield for the 1983 general election. He subsequently worked for Blair in his constituency office, the Labour Party and a PR company.

== Parliamentary career ==
=== House of Commons ===
Wilson was a Labour Assistant Whip from 2010 to 2015. In 2012, he was elected to the Progress strategy board. In his work for Progress, he was criticised for a blog post that he was accused of plagiarising.

In 2013, a letter attributed to Conservative MP John Glen accused Wilson of failing to properly declare donations from Hitachi before speaking about the matter in a House of Commons debate. Glen subsequently accepted that Wilson was not at fault and apologised personally to him, saying the letter had been drafted on his behalf and he had not read it before it was issued. In his biography on his personal website, Wilson states that bringing a Hitachi Rail factory project to Newton Aycliffe in his constituency represents his "proudest political achievement so far".

In his 2017 general election voter leaflet, Wilson stated he was not a supporter of Labour leader Jeremy Corbyn, and suggested Labour would not win the election. He had supported Owen Smith in the failed attempt to replace Corbyn in the 2016 Labour leadership election.

In 2018, Wilson called for a second referendum on Brexit. He said: "Before we retreat to the past, people should be given another chance to decide whether that is where they want to end up". Later he supported the proposal to join the European Economic Area to mitigate the perceived disadvantages of Brexit. 59.4% of those who voted in Wilson's constituency of Sedgefield voted to Leave the European Union.

=== House of Lords ===
Wilson was nominated for a life peerage by Prime Minister Keir Starmer in late 2024. He was created Baron Wilson of Sedgefield, of Trimdon in the County of Durham, on 16 January 2025, and was introduced to the House of Lords on 20 January. On 10 February 2025, Wilson was appointed as a lord-in-waiting government whip.

Parliament of the United Kingdom
Preceded by Tony Blair	Member of Parliament for Sedgefield; 2007–2019	Succeeded by Paul Howell
