= Nigel Birch, Baron Rhyl =

British politician (1906-1981)

The Right Honourable The Lord Rhyl OBE PC

Secretary of State for Air
- In office 20 December 1955 – 16 January 1957
- Monarch: Elizabeth II
- Prime Minister: Anthony Eden; Harold Macmillan
- Preceded by: The Lord De L'Isle and Dudley
- Succeeded by: George Ward

Member of Parliament for West Flintshire Flintshire (1945–1950)
- In office 1945–1970
- Preceded by: Gwilym Rowlands
- Succeeded by: Anthony Meyer

Personal details
- Born: 18 November 1906
- Died: 8 March 1981 (aged 74)
- Education: Eton

Evelyn Nigel Chetwode Birch, Baron Rhyl OBE PC (18 November 1906 – 8 March 1981) was a British Conservative politician.

The son of General Sir Noel Birch and his wife Florence Chetwode, Nigel Birch was educated at Eton. He was a partner in Cohen Laming Hoare until May 1939 when he retired to study politics. He served in World War II in the King's Royal Rifle Corps and on General Staff, being promoted to the rank of lieutenant-colonel in 1944. He was appointed an Officer of the Order of the British Empire (OBE) in 1945.

He was Conservative Member of Parliament for Flintshire from 1945 to 1950 and for West Flintshire from 1950 to 1970. He served in government as Parliamentary Under-Secretary of State for Air from 1951 to 1952, Parliamentary Secretary to the Ministry of Defence from 1952 to 1954, Minister of Works from October 1954 to December 1955, Secretary of State for Air from December 1955 to January 1957 and Economic Secretary to the Treasury from 1957 to 1958.

His resignation in 1958, along with that of the Chancellor of the Exchequer Peter Thorneycroft and fellow Treasury Minister Enoch Powell, was described by Harold Macmillan as "little local difficulties".

In 1950 he married Esmé Glyn, the daughter of the 4th Baron Wolverton.

In 1955, he was appointed a privy counsellor, and on 7 July 1970, he was created a life peer as Baron Rhyl, of Holywell in the parish of Swanmore in the County of Southampton.

== Sources ==
- Who Was Who

Parliament of the United Kingdom
Preceded by Gwilym Rowlands	Member of Parliament for Flintshire; 1945 – 1950	Constituency abolished
New constituency	Member of Parliament for West Flintshire; 1950 – 1970	Succeeded by Sir Anthony Meyer
Political offices
Preceded by William Sidney, 1st Viscount De L'Isle	Secretary of State for Air; 1955–1957	Succeeded by The Hon. George Ward
Preceded by Derek Walker-Smith	Economic Secretary to the Treasury; 1957 – 1958	Succeeded by Frederick Erroll
