= 1989 Conservative Party leadership election =

British leadership election to challenge Margaret Thatcher

- 5 December 1989
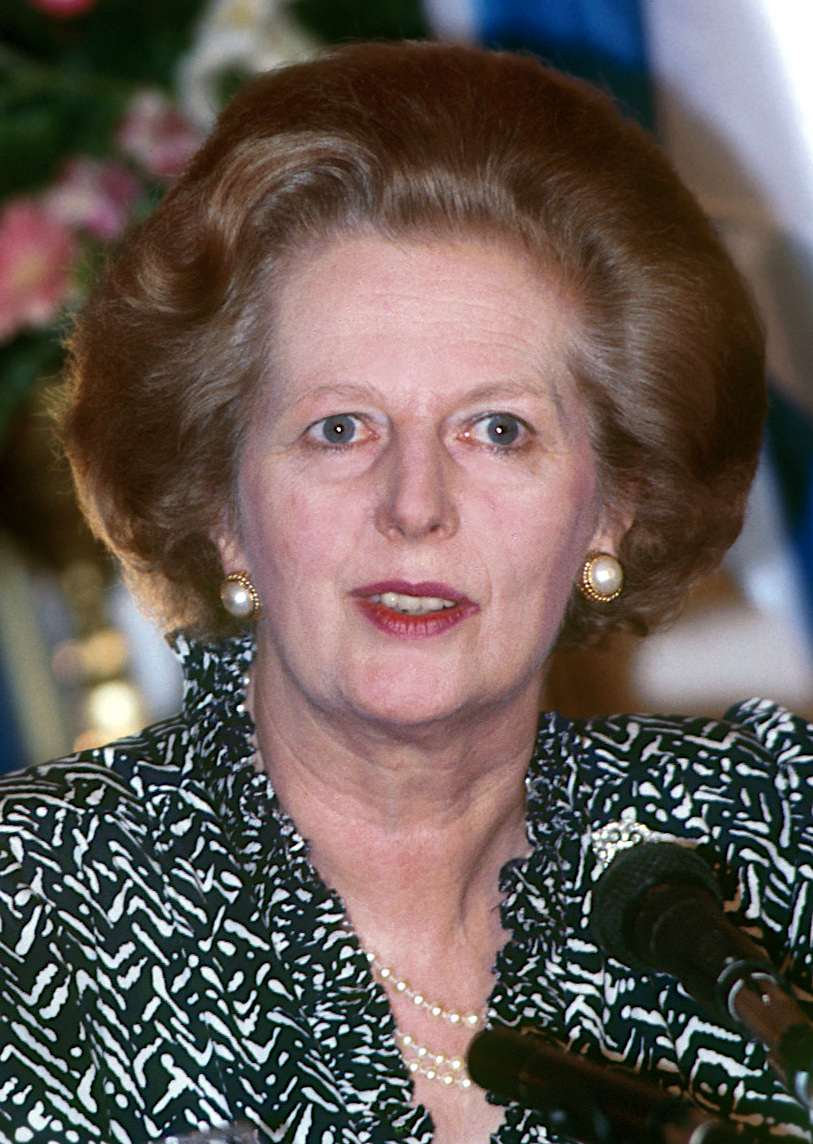

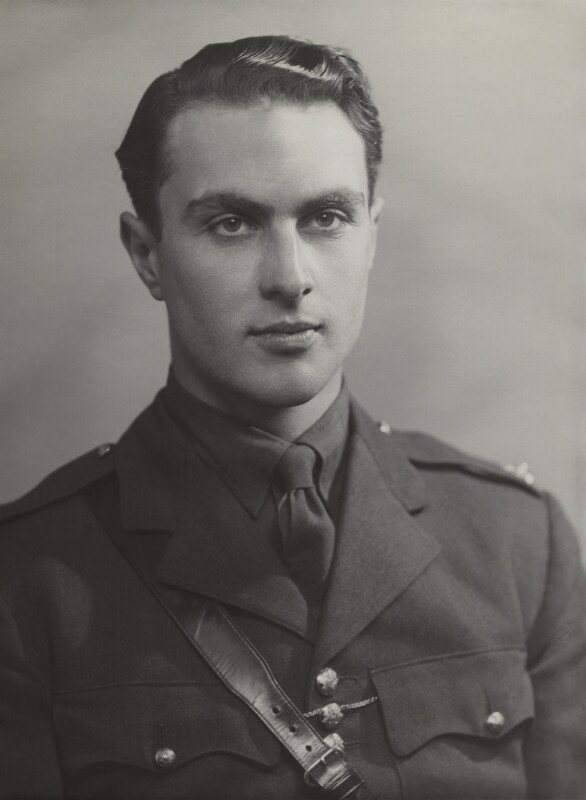
Candidate	Margaret Thatcher	Sir Anthony Meyer
Percentage	90.5%	9.5%
First ballot	314	33
Leader before election
Margaret Thatcher
Elected Leader
Margaret Thatcher

The 1989 Conservative Party leadership election took place on 5 December 1989. The incumbent Margaret Thatcher was opposed by the little-known 69-year-old backbencher MP Sir Anthony Meyer. It was the Conservative Party's first leadership election for nearly 15 years, when Thatcher had taken the party leadership.

Whilst Thatcher comfortably won with 90% of the vote, the vote showed 60 MPs who didn't vote for her either by choosing Meyer, spoiling the ballots or abstaining. This can be attributed to her increasingly Eurosceptic views on European integration in the late 1980s, despite the Conservatives still being primarily pro-Europe at the time. The outcome would ultimately undermine Thatcher as her leadership started to come into question. The following year would see Thatcher once again challenged and eventually resigning following public unrest and discontent within her party.

== Background ==
During 1989 the Conservative government led by Thatcher had run into difficulties. In June Labour won their first national electoral victory since 1974 in the elections to the European Parliament, beating the Conservatives. The Chancellor of the Exchequer, Nigel Lawson, had resigned in October over Thatcher's determination to follow the advice of her advisers, specifically Sir Alan Walters. Opinion polls were also starting to show a widening Labour lead, which had opened up since the Community Charge (or "poll tax") was phased in the previous April; public anger at this community charge mounted over the subsequent months. Thatcher had long considered, as her husband Denis desired, to stand down in May 1989 following 10 years as prime minister. However, having won a 102-seat majority at the general election two years previously, and having led the party for 14 years without a hint of a leadership challenge, Thatcher opted to carry on for a full third term.

As a result, Thatcher faced mounting internal party criticism, which culminated in the decision of Meyer to offer a stalking horse candidacy for the party leadership.

Sir Anthony Meyer was critical of the recently introduced Community Charge (which was seen by many as the key factor in the government's declining popularity), Thatcher's leadership style and her Euroscepticism. She had now led the party for nearly 15 years and had been prime minister for over 10 of those years.

Thatcher's European views came under attack from other Conservatives during the campaign. On 3 December, two days before the ballot, the BBC broadcast a programme on Jacques Delors in which Thatcher's predecessor as Conservative leader, Edward Heath, had labelled Thatcher as a "narrow little nationalist" who was "unable to move with the whole movement of history in creating the greater Europe." Meanwhile European Commissioner and former member of her cabinet Leon Brittan had said on television that membership of the European Exchange Rate Mechanism had benefited the countries which had joined it, which was seen as being at odds with Mrs Thatcher's own views.

== Results ==
Only ballot: 5 December 1989
Candidate	Votes	%
Margaret Thatcher	314	84.0
Sir Anthony Meyer	33	8.8
Abstentions	3	0.8
Spoilt	24	6.4
Majority	281	75.1
Turnout	374	N/A
Margaret Thatcher re-elected

== Reactions ==
Thatcher, whose campaign was organised by former Cabinet minister George Younger, won the contest overwhelmingly and said afterwards:

I would like to say how very pleased I am with this result and how very pleased I am to have had the overwhelming support of my colleagues in the House and the people from the party in the country.

However, a total of 60 Conservative MPs did not support Thatcher by either voting for Meyer, spoiling their ballot papers, or abstaining. Michael Heseltine was reported the next day as being believed to be one of the three MPs who did not vote, along with the absent Bob McCrindle who was seriously ill. Another ill MP, Alick Buchanan-Smith, was also absent, but voted by proxy, reportedly for Meyer.

Following the ballot Meyer said:

I was quite surprised to get so many votes, I thought I'd be beaten by the abstentions. The total result I think is rather better than I'd expected and not quite as good as some of my friends were hoping for.

According to the next day's Glasgow Herald Heseltine's supporters predicted that unless the Prime Minister changed "her style of leadership", she would "be on her way out next year".

== Aftermath ==
A month later Meyer was deselected as a candidate for the next general election by his local constituency Conservative party.

Within a year, as the Community Charge (poll tax) sparked riots, the economy slid towards recession, and the Labour lead in the opinion polls mounted into double digits, Thatcher resigned as party leader and prime minister following a further contest in November 1990.
