= Sedgefield (constituency) =

UK Parliament constituency (1918–1974, 1983–2024)

- Former county constituency for the House of Commons
- 2010–2024 boundary of Sedgefield in County Durham

- Location of County Durham within England
- County: County Durham
- Electorate: 67,386 (December 2010)
- Major settlements: Sedgefield, Newton Aycliffe, Ferryhill

1983–2024
- Seats: One
- Created from: Durham, North West Durham, Easington and Bishop Auckland
- Replaced by: Newton Aycliffe and Spennymoor; Stockton West (minor part); Easington (minor part); Darlington (minor part)

1918–1974
- Seats: One
- Type of constituency: County constituency
- Created from: South East Durham, The Hartlepools and Mid Durham
- Replaced by: Bishop Auckland, Durham, Easington

Sedgefield was a constituency in County Durham represented in the House of Commons of the UK Parliament from 1918 to 1974 and again from 1983 to 2024. (Note: As with all current constituencies, the constituency elected one Member of Parliament (MP) by the first past the post system of election at least every five years.) Its final Member of Parliament (MP) was Paul Howell of the Conservative Party, who held the seat from 2019 until its abolition for the 2024 general election.

From 1983 to 2007, its MP was Tony Blair, who served as Prime Minister from 1997 to 2007.

Under the 2023 review of Westminster constituencies, the seat was abolished. Subject to major boundary changes, though retaining the town of Sedgefield, the constituency was reformed as Newton Aycliffe and Spennymoor to reflect the two largest communities in the revised seat.

== History ==
=== 1918–1974 ===
Sedgefield was first created under the Representation of the People Act 1918 for the 1918 general election, comprising primarily southern parts of the abolished South Eastern Division of Durham, including the communities of Segefield and Billingham. It also included parts of the former Mid Durham seat (Ferryhill) and a small area transferred from Bishop Auckland (Chilton).

It was abolished for the February 1974 general election, when its contents were distributed to the neighbouring seats of Bishop Auckland (Darlington RD), Durham (Sedgefield RD), Easington (Stockton RD) and Teesside, Stockton (Billingham UD).

=== 1983–2024 ===
The constituency was recreated at the next redistribution, which came into effect at the 1983 general election, with similar boundaries, but excluding Billingham and Newton Aycliffe and including Spennymoor.

== Boundaries ==
=== 1918–1950 ===
- The Rural Districts of Darlington, Hartlepool, Sedgefield, and Stockton

=== 1950–1974 ===
- The Urban District of Billingham; and
- the Rural Districts of Darlington, Sedgefield and Stockton.

Minor changes – the Rural District of Stockton had been altered, absorbing the Rural District of Hartlepool, but losing Billingham to a new urban district.

From 1955, the boundaries of the Rural Districts of Darlington, Sedgefield and Stockton were altered in line with changes to local authority boundaries.

=== 1983–1997 ===
- The District of Sedgefield wards of Bishop Middleham, Broom, Chilton, Cornforth, Ferryhill, Fishburn, Low Spennymoor and Tudhoe Grange, Middlestone, New Trimdon and Trimdon Grange, Old Trimdon, Sedgefield, Spennymoor, and Tudhoe;
- the District of Easington wards of Deaf Hill, Hutton Henry, Thornley, Wheatley Hill, and Wingate; and
- the Borough of Darlington wards of Heighington, Hurworth, Middleton St George, Sadberge, and Whessoe.

Spennymoor and Tudhoe transferred from North West Durham; remainder of District of Sedgefield wards from Durham; District of Easington wards from Easington; and Borough of Darlington wards from Bishop Auckland.

=== 1997–2010 ===
- The District of Sedgefield wards of Bishop Middleham, Broom, Chilton, Cornforth, Ferryhill, Fishburn, Middridge, Neville, New Trimdon and Trimdon Grange, Old Trimdon, Sedgefield, Shafto, Simpasture, West, and Woodham;
- the District of Easington wards of Deaf Hill, Hutton Henry, Thornley, Wheatley Hill, and Wingate; and
- the Borough of Darlington wards of Heighington, Hurworth, Middleton St George, Sadberge, and Whessoe.

Newton Aycliffe transferred in from Bishop Auckland in exchange for Spennymoor and Tudhoe.

=== 2010–2024 ===
Map of 2010–2024 boundaries
- The Borough of Sedgefield wards of Bishop Middleham and Cornforth, Broom, Chilton, Ferryhill, Fishburn and Old Trimdon, Greenfield Middridge, Neville and Simpasture, New Trimdon and Trimdon Grange, Sedgefield, Shafto St Mary's, West, and Woodham;
- the District of Easington wards of Thornley and Wheatley Hill, and Wingate; and
- the Borough of Darlington wards of Heighington and Coniscliffe, Hurworth, Middleton St George, Sadberge, and Whessoe.

Minor changes only to reflect redrawing of local authority ward boundaries.

In the 2009 structural changes to local government in England, the local authority districts in Durham were abolished and replaced with a single unitary authority; however, this did affected the boundaries of the constituency.

=== Constituency changes ===
The 2023 review of Westminster constituencies recommended that all wards in the Borough of Darlington should be removed from the seat, with Shildon moving in from Bishop Auckland and Coxhoe from City of Durham. The reconfigured seat would be renamed "Newton Aycliffe and Sedgefield".

== Political history ==
From its recreation in 1983 until 27 June 2007, the Member of Parliament was Tony Blair, who led a successful campaign for his party to win the 1997 general election in a landslide and thereafter served for ten years as prime minister, leading the campaigns at two subsequent general elections. Blair was the first Prime Minister to lead the Labour Party to three consecutive victories. He resigned as the Member of Parliament for Sedgefield on the same day as he resigned as prime minister, which triggered a by-election.

At the by-election on 19 July 2007, the official Labour Party candidate Phil Wilson was elected on a reduced majority which in national terms is safe instead of marginal. While Wilson had never came close to the enormous majorities held by Blair during his tenure as MP and only secured an absolute majority of the vote for the first time at the 2017 general election, he consistently had majorities of over 6,000 votes in every election at which he had stood.

At the 2019 election, the Conservatives' candidate Paul Howell defeated Wilson with a majority of 4,513 and a swing of 12.8%. Sedgefield was one of the net gain of 48 seats in England by the Conservatives, as well as being considered part of the so-called "Red Wall".

== Constituency profile ==
Sedgefield has a long mining history (extracting coal, fluorspar and iron ore) and once had a very strong affiliation to the Labour Party, with nearly monolithic support in parts of the constituency. The area contains a mixture of former coal country in the area around Trimdon and more industrial areas around the new town of Newton Aycliffe. The construction of a new Hitachi factory created 730 jobs in the town. There are also more prosperous parts of the constituency that form the bulk of the Conservative vote – for example, the ancient market town of Sedgefield itself, with a charter dating back to 1312. The outer suburbs of Darlington are also relatively wealthy, as well as Hurworth-on-Tees, where unemployment stands at just 1.0%.

In statistics

The constituency consists of Census Output Areas of two local government districts with similar characteristics: a working population whose average income is lower than the national average and close-to-average reliance upon social housing. At the end of 2012 the unemployment rate in the constituency stood as 5.0% of the population claiming Jobseekers' Allowance, compared to the regional average of 5.5%.

The local authority contributing to the bulk of the seat has a middling 27.2% of its population without a car, a high 27.5% of the population without qualifications and a medium 21.5% with level 4 qualifications or above. Darlington has 28% of its population without a car, 24.8% of the population without qualifications and a medium 23.7% with level 4 qualifications or above.

In terms of tenure 65.8% of County Durham homes and 64.9% of Darlington homes are owned outright or on a mortgage as at the 2011 census.

== Members of Parliament ==
=== MPs 1918–1974 ===
| Election | Member | Party |
|---|---|---|
| 1918 | Rowland Burdon | Coalition Conservative |
| 1922 | John Herriotts | Labour |
| 1923 | Leonard Ropner | Conservative |
| 1929 | John Herriotts | Labour |
| 1931 | Roland Jennings | Conservative |
| 1935 | John Leslie | Labour |
| 1950 | Joe Slater | Labour |
| 1970 | David Reed | Labour |
| 1974 | Constituency abolished | |

=== MPs 1983–2024 ===
| Election | Member | Party |
|---|---|---|
| 1983 | Tony Blair | Labour |
| 2007 by-election | Phil Wilson | Labour |
| 2019 | Paul Howell | Conservative |
| 2024 | Constituency abolished | |

== Election results 1983–2024 ==
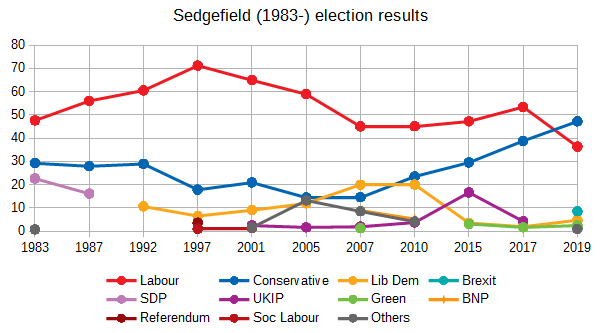
Election results in constituency

=== Elections in the 1980s ===
General election 1983: Sedgefield
| Party | Candidate | Votes | % | ±% |
|---|---|---|---|---|
| Labour | Tony Blair | 21,401 | 47.6 | |
| Conservative | Toby Horton | 13,120 | 29.2 | |
| SDP | David Shand | 10,183 | 22.6 | |
| Independent | Maurice Logan-Salton | 298 | 0.7 | |
| Majority | | 8,281 | 18.4 | |
| Turnout | | 45,002 | 72.9 | |
| Labour win (new seat) | | | | |

General election 1987: Sedgefield
| Party | Candidate | Votes | % | ±% |
|---|---|---|---|---|
| Labour | Tony Blair | 25,965 | 56.0 | +8.4 |
| Conservative | Nigel Hawkins | 12,907 | 27.9 | −1.3 |
| SDP | Ralph Andrew | 7,477 | 16.1 | −6.5 |
| Majority | | 13,058 | 28.1 | +9.7 |
| Turnout | | 46,349 | 76.2 | +3.3 |
| Labour hold | | Swing | +4.9 | |

=== Elections in the 1990s ===
General election 1992: Sedgefield
| Party | Candidate | Votes | % | ±% |
|---|---|---|---|---|
| Labour | Tony Blair | 28,453 | 60.5 | +4.5 |
| Conservative | Nicholas Jopling | 13,594 | 28.9 | +1.0 |
| Liberal Democrats | Gary Huntington | 4,982 | 10.6 | −5.5 |
| Majority | | 14,859 | 31.6 | +3.5 |
| Turnout | | 47,029 | 77.1 | +0.9 |
| Labour hold | | Swing | +1.8 | |

General election 1997: Sedgefield
| Party | Candidate | Votes | % | ±% |
|---|---|---|---|---|
| Labour | Tony Blair | 33,526 | 71.2 | +10.7 |
| Conservative | Elizabeth Pitman | 8,383 | 17.8 | −11.1 |
| Liberal Democrats | Ronald Beadle | 3,050 | 6.5 | −4.1 |
| Referendum | Miriam Hall | 1,683 | 3.6 | New |
| Socialist Labour | Brian Gibson | 474 | 1.0 | New |
| Majority | | 25,143 | 53.4 | +21.8 |
| Turnout | | 47,116 | 72.6 | −4.5 |
| Labour hold | | Swing | +11.3 | |

=== Elections in the 2000s ===
General election 2001: Sedgefield
| Party | Candidate | Votes | % | ±% |
|---|---|---|---|---|
| Labour | Tony Blair | 26,110 | 64.9 | −6.3 |
| Conservative | Douglas Carswell | 8,397 | 20.9 | +3.1 |
| Liberal Democrats | Andrew Duffield | 3,624 | 9.0 | +2.5 |
| UKIP | Andrew Spence | 974 | 2.4 | New |
| Socialist Labour | Brian Gibson | 518 | 1.3 | +0.3 |
| Rock 'n' Roll Loony | Christopher Driver | 375 | 0.9 | New |
| Independent | Helen John | 260 | 0.6 | New |
| Majority | | 17,713 | 44.0 | −9.4 |
| Turnout | | 40,258 | 62.0 | −10.6 |
| Labour hold | | Swing | −4.7 | |

General election 2005: Sedgefield
| Party | Candidate | Votes | % | ±% |
|---|---|---|---|---|
| Labour | Tony Blair | 24,421 | 58.9 | −6.0 |
| Conservative | Al Lockwood | 5,972 | 14.4 | −6.5 |
| Liberal Democrats | Robert Woodthorpe Browne | 4,935 | 11.9 | +2.9 |
| Independent | Reg Keys | 4,252 | 10.3 | New |
| UKIP | William Brown | 646 | 1.6 | −0.8 |
| National Front | Mark Farrell | 253 | 0.6 | New |
| Veritas | Fiona Luckhurst-Matthews | 218 | 0.5 | New |
| Independent | Berony Abraham | 209 | 0.5 | New |
| Monster Raving Loony | Melodie Staniforth | 157 | 0.4 | New |
| Blair Must Go Party | Jonathan Cockburn | 103 | 0.2 | New |
| Senior Citizens | Terence Pattinson | 97 | 0.2 | New |
| Pensioners | Cherri Gilham | 82 | 0.2 | New |
| Independent | Helen John | 68 | 0.2 | −0.4 |
| Independent | John Barker | 45 | 0.1 | New |
| Independent | Julian Brennan | 17 | 0.0 | New |
| Majority | | 18,449 | 44.5 | +0.5 |
| Turnout | | 41,475 | 62.2 | +0.2 |
| Labour hold | | Swing | +0.25 | |

By-election 2007: Sedgefield
| Party | Candidate | Votes | % | ±% |
|---|---|---|---|---|
| Labour | Phil Wilson | 12,528 | 44.8 | −14.1 |
| Liberal Democrats | Gregory Stone | 5,572 | 19.9 | +8.0 |
| Conservative | Graham Robb | 4,082 | 14.6 | +0.2 |
| BNP | Andrew Spence | 2,494 | 8.9 | New |
| Independent | Paul Gittins | 1,885 | 6.7 | New |
| UKIP | Gavin Horton | 536 | 1.9 | +0.3 |
| Green | Christopher Haine | 348 | 1.2 | New |
| English Democrat | Stephen Gash | 177 | 0.6 | New |
| Christian Vote | Tim Grainger | 177 | 0.6 | New |
| Monster Raving Loony | Alan Hope | 129 | 0.5 | +0.1 |
| Anti Crime | Norman Scarth | 34 | 0.1 | New |
| Majority | | 6,956 | 24.9 | −19.6 |
| Turnout | | 27,962 | 43.0 | −19.2 |
| Labour hold | | Swing | −11.0 | |

=== Elections in the 2010s ===
General election 2010: Sedgefield
| Party | Candidate | Votes | % | ±% |
|---|---|---|---|---|
| Labour | Phil Wilson | 18,141 | 45.1 | −13.9 |
| Conservative | Neil Mahapatra | 9,445 | 23.5 | +9.3 |
| Liberal Democrats | Alan Thompson | 8,033 | 20.0 | +8.2 |
| BNP | Mark Walker | 2,075 | 5.2 | N/A |
| UKIP | Brian Gregory | 1,479 | 3.7 | +2.1 |
| Independent | Paul Gittins | 1,049 | 2.6 | N/A |
| Majority | | 8,696 | 21.6 | −3.3 |
| Turnout | | 40,222 | 62.1 | −0.2 |
| Labour hold | | Swing | −11.6 | |

General election 2015: Sedgefield
| Party | Candidate | Votes | % | ±% |
|---|---|---|---|---|
| Labour | Phil Wilson | 18,275 | 47.2 | +2.1 |
| Conservative | Scott Wood | 11,432 | 29.5 | +6.0 |
| UKIP | John Leathley | 6,426 | 16.6 | +12.9 |
| Liberal Democrats | Stephen Glenn | 1,370 | 3.5 | −16.5 |
| Green | Greg Robinson | 1,213 | 3.1 | New |
| Majority | | 6,843 | 17.7 | −3.9 |
| Turnout | | 38,716 | 61.6 | −0.5 |
| Labour hold | | Swing | −2.0 | |

General election 2017: Sedgefield
| Party | Candidate | Votes | % | ±% |
|---|---|---|---|---|
| Labour | Phil Wilson | 22,202 | 53.4 | +6.2 |
| Conservative | Dehenna Davison | 16,143 | 38.8 | +9.3 |
| UKIP | John Grant | 1,763 | 4.2 | −12.4 |
| Liberal Democrats | Stephen Psallidas | 797 | 1.9 | −1.6 |
| Green | Melissa Wilson | 686 | 1.6 | −1.5 |
| Majority | | 6,059 | 14.6 | −3.1 |
| Turnout | | 41,591 | 65.1 | +3.5 |
| Labour hold | | Swing | −1.6 | |

General election 2019: Sedgefield
| Party | Candidate | Votes | % | ±% |
|---|---|---|---|---|
| Conservative | Paul Howell | 19,609 | 47.2 | +8.4 |
| Labour | Phil Wilson | 15,096 | 36.3 | −17.1 |
| Brexit Party | David Bull | 3,518 | 8.5 | New |
| Liberal Democrats | Dawn Welsh | 1,955 | 4.7 | +2.8 |
| Green | John Furness | 994 | 2.4 | +0.8 |
| Independent | Michael Joyce | 394 | 0.9 | New |
| Majority | | 4,513 | 10.9 | N/A |
| Turnout | | 41,566 | 64.6 | −0.5 |
| Registered electors | | 64,325 | | |
| Conservative gain from Labour | | Swing | +12.8 | |

== Election results 1918–1974 ==
=== Elections in the 1910s ===
Charles Starmer, candidate for the seat in 1918

General election 1918: Sedgefield
| Party | | Candidate | Votes | % | ±% |
|---|---|---|---|---|---|
| C | Unionist | Rowland Burdon | 6,627 | 42.1 | |
| | Labour | John Herriotts | 5,801 | 36.8 | |
| | Liberal | Charles Starmer | 3,333 | 21.1 | |
| Majority | | | 826 | 5.3 | |
| Turnout | | | 15,761 | 63.4 | |
| | Unionist win (new seat) | | | | |
C indicates candidate endorsed by the coalition government.

=== Elections in the 1920s ===
General election 1922: Sedgefield
| Party | Candidate | Votes | % | ±% |
|---|---|---|---|---|
| Labour | John Herriotts | 9,756 | 43.6 | +6.8 |
| Unionist | Eli Waddington | 9,067 | 40.5 | −1.6 |
| Liberal | Charles Henry Brown | 3,561 | 15.9 | −5.2 |
| Majority | | 689 | 3.1 | N/A |
| Turnout | | 22,384 | 76.1 | +12.7 |
| Labour gain from Unionist | | Swing | +4.2 | |

General election 1923: Sedgefield
| Party | Candidate | Votes | % | ±% |
|---|---|---|---|---|
| Unionist | Leonard Ropner | 11,093 | 50.0 | +9.5 |
| Labour | John Herriotts | 11,087 | 50.0 | +6.4 |
| Majority | | 6 | 0.0 | N/A |
| Turnout | | 22,180 | 74.5 | −1.6 |
| Unionist gain from Labour | | Swing | +1.6 | |

General election 1924: Sedgefield
| Party | Candidate | Votes | % | ±% |
|---|---|---|---|---|
| Unionist | Leonard Ropner | 13,968 | 52.7 | +2.7 |
| Labour | John Herriotts | 12,552 | 47.3 | −2.7 |
| Majority | | 1,416 | 5.4 | +5.4 |
| Turnout | | 26,520 | 85.4 | +10.9 |
| Unionist hold | | Swing | +2.7 | |

General election 1929: Sedgefield
| Party | Candidate | Votes | % | ±% |
|---|---|---|---|---|
| Labour | John Herriotts | 15,749 | 47.7 | +0.4 |
| Unionist | Leonard Ropner | 13,043 | 39.5 | −13.2 |
| Liberal | William Leeson | 4,236 | 12.8 | New |
| Majority | | 2,706 | 8.2 | N/A |
| Turnout | | 33,028 | 83.0 | −2.4 |
| Labour gain from Unionist | | Swing | +6.8 | |

=== Elections in the 1930s ===
General election 1931: Sedgefield
| Party | Candidate | Votes | % | ±% |
|---|---|---|---|---|
| Conservative | Roland Jennings | 21,956 | 58.8 | +19.3 |
| Labour | John Herriotts | 15,404 | 41.2 | −6.5 |
| Majority | | 6,552 | 17.6 | N/A |
| Turnout | | 37,360 | 84.4 | +1.4 |
| Conservative gain from Labour | | Swing | +12.9 | |

General election 1935: Sedgefield
| Party | Candidate | Votes | % | ±% |
|---|---|---|---|---|
| Labour | John Leslie | 20,375 | 52.3 | +11.1 |
| Conservative | Roland Jennings | 18,604 | 47.7 | −11.1 |
| Majority | | 1,771 | 4.6 | N/A |
| Turnout | | 38,979 | 81.4 | −3.0 |
| Labour gain from Conservative | | Swing | +11.1 | |

=== Elections in the 1940s ===
General election 1945: Sedgefield
| Party | Candidate | Votes | % | ±% |
|---|---|---|---|---|
| Labour | John Leslie | 27,051 | 63.8 | +11.5 |
| Conservative | John Walford | 15,360 | 36.2 | −11.5 |
| Majority | | 11,691 | 27.6 | +23.0 |
| Turnout | | 42,411 | 77.5 | −3.9 |
| Labour hold | | Swing | +11.5 | |

=== Elections in the 1950s ===
General election 1950: Sedgefield
| Party | Candidate | Votes | % | ±% |
|---|---|---|---|---|
| Labour | Joseph Slater | 27,946 | 62.5 | −1.3 |
| Conservative | John Walford | 16,782 | 37.5 | +1.3 |
| Majority | | 11,164 | 25.0 | −2.6 |
| Turnout | | 44,728 | 87.0 | +9.5 |
| Labour hold | | Swing | -1.3 | |

General election 1951: Sedgefield
| Party | Candidate | Votes | % | ±% |
|---|---|---|---|---|
| Labour | Joseph Slater | 28,219 | 62.3 | −0.2 |
| Conservative | Eric H Harrison | 17,095 | 37.7 | +0.2 |
| Majority | | 11,124 | 24.6 | −0.4 |
| Turnout | | 45,314 | 86.4 | −0.6 |
| Labour hold | | Swing | -0.2 | |

General election 1955: Sedgefield
| Party | Candidate | Votes | % | ±% |
|---|---|---|---|---|
| Labour | Joseph Slater | 27,221 | 59.7 | −2.6 |
| Conservative | Dudley Fitz Mowbray Appleby | 18,368 | 40.3 | +2.6 |
| Majority | | 8,853 | 19.4 | −5.2 |
| Turnout | | 45,589 | 79.9 | −6.5 |
| Labour hold | | Swing | -2.6 | |

General election 1959: Sedgefield
| Party | Candidate | Votes | % | ±% |
|---|---|---|---|---|
| Labour | Joseph Slater | 30,642 | 58.5 | −1.2 |
| Conservative | Dudley Fitz Mowbray Appleby | 21,771 | 41.5 | +1.2 |
| Majority | | 8,871 | 17.0 | −2.6 |
| Turnout | | 52,413 | 82.5 | +2.6 |
| Labour hold | | Swing | -1.2 | |

=== Elections in the 1960s ===
General election 1964: Sedgefield
| Party | Candidate | Votes | % | ±% |
|---|---|---|---|---|
| Labour | Joseph Slater | 32,273 | 60.7 | +2.2 |
| Conservative | Cyril Frank Thring | 20,931 | 39.3 | −2.2 |
| Majority | | 11,342 | 21.4 | +4.4 |
| Turnout | | 53,204 | 79.5 | −3.0 |
| Labour hold | | Swing | +2.2 | |

General election 1966: Sedgefield
| Party | Candidate | Votes | % | ±% |
|---|---|---|---|---|
| Labour | Joseph Slater | 34,058 | 64.7 | +4.0 |
| Conservative | Cyril Frank Thring | 18,620 | 35.4 | −4.1 |
| Majority | | 15,438 | 29.3 | +7.9 |
| Turnout | | 52,678 | 76.0 | −3.5 |
| Labour hold | | Swing | +4.1 | |

=== Elections in the 1970s ===
General election 1970: Sedgefield
| Party | Candidate | Votes | % | ±% |
|---|---|---|---|---|
| Labour | David Reed | 36,867 | 60.5 | −4.2 |
| Conservative | Arthur Albert Beck | 24,036 | 39.5 | +4.1 |
| Majority | | 12,831 | 21.0 | −8.3 |
| Turnout | | 60,903 | 72.7 | −3.3 |
| Labour hold | | Swing | -4.2 | |

== See also ==
- Parliamentary constituencies in County Durham
- History of parliamentary constituencies and boundaries in Durham

== Notes ==
Parliament of the United Kingdom
| Preceded by Derby South | Constituency represented by the leader of the opposition 1994–1997 | Succeeded by Huntingdon |
| Preceded by Huntingdon | Constituency represented by the prime minister 1997–2007 | Succeeded by Kirkcaldy and Cowdenbeath |
