= Ferryhill Business and Enterprise College =

Coordinates: 54.68411°N 1.5754°W

Ferryhill School

Location
- Merrington Road; Ferryhill, County Durham, DL17 8RW; England

Information
- Type: Academy
- Local authority: Durham County Council
- Trust: Eden Learning Trust
- Department for Education URN: 145253 Tables
- Ofsted: Reports
- Headteacher: K Brennan
- Gender: Coeducational
- Age: 11 to 16
- Colours: black and white
- Website: https://ferryhill.school/

Ferryhill School (formerly Ferryhill Business And Enterprise College and before that Ferryhill Comprehensive School) is a coeducational secondary school located in Ferryhill, County Durham, England. The school specialises in Business and Enterprise.

Previously a community school administered by Durham County Council, in May 2018 Ferryhill Business And Enterprise College converted to academy status. The school is now sponsored by, and hosts, the Eden Learning Trust.
