= 2007 Sedgefield by-election =

2007 UK Parliamentary by-election

- 19 July 2007

Sedgefield constituency
- Turnout: 41.6% ▼13.23pp
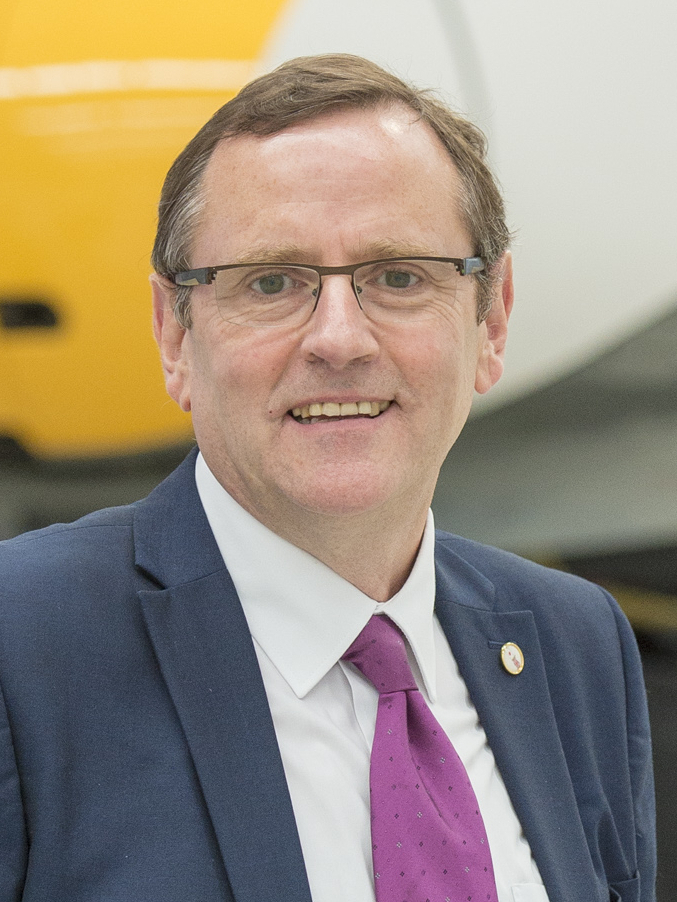
	First party	Second party	Third party
		Lib	Con
Candidate	Phil Wilson	Greg Stone	Graham Robb
Party	Labour	Liberal Democrats	Conservative
Popular vote	12,528	5,572	4,082
Percentage	44.8%	19.9%	14.6%
Swing	▼14.1%	▲8.0%	▲0.2%
	Fourth party	Fifth party
Candidate	Andrew Spence	Paul Gittins
Party	BNP	Independent
Popular vote	2,494	1,885
Percentage	8.9%	6.7%
MP before election
Tony Blair
Labour
Subsequent MP
Phil Wilson
Labour

Map of Sedgefield

A by-election for the United Kingdom parliamentary constituency of Sedgefield was held on 19 July 2007, triggered by the resignation of incumbent Labour Party Member of Parliament (MP) and Prime Minister Tony Blair. It was won by Phil Wilson, who held the seat for Labour.

The by-election was initiated when Blair resigned both of his parliamentary offices in order to become envoy for the international diplomatic Quartet on the Middle East. He had held the constituency since its creation in 1983, and Labour had held the seat and its predecessors since 1935.

The Ealing Southall by-election was held on the same day, also resulting in a Labour hold.

== Background and candidates ==
Tony Blair, Labour Party Member of Parliament (MP) for Sedgefield and Prime Minister, resigned both offices on 27 June 2007. Blair also resigned as an MP to become envoy for the international diplomatic Quartet on the Middle East; he accepted the office of Steward and Bailiff of the Three Hundreds of Chiltern, thereby disqualifying himself from Parliament and causing the by-election.

The Labour Party selected Phil Wilson, a public relations consultant, local party member and one of the "Famous Five" who had promoted Tony Blair's first candidacy in 1983. He was chosen from a shortlist of five candidates, including former Minister Melanie Johnson. The Liberal Democrats chose North East regeneration expert Greg Stone, a councillor in Newcastle-upon-Tyne and former candidate in the Vale of York in the 2001 election and Newcastle-upon-Tyne Central in the 2005 election. The Conservatives stood Graham Robb, a public relations consultant and former radio presenter, who stood for the party in 1992 in Hartlepool, losing to Peter Mandelson.

Several other candidates contested the election. The UK Independence Party (UKIP) selected Toby Horton, who formerly contested the seat for the Conservatives in 1983, and in 1992 stood in Rother Valley. The Green Party of England and Wales chose Chris Haine, and the British National Party chose Andrew Spence, who was involved in the 2000 fuel protests and stood for UKIP in the seat in 2001. The leader of the Official Monster Raving Loony Party, Alan Hope, also stood, having previously contested a long list of seats in both general and by-elections. The English Democrats chose Stephen Gash, and Operation Christian Vote fielded barrister Tim Grainger. Norman Scarth stood as an independent "anti crime" candidate, having previously contested Chesterfield in 1997 as an "independent old age pensioner". Local independent councillor Paul Gittins stood on a platform calling for the regeneration of the centre of Newton Aycliffe.

== Result ==
Wilson held the seat for Labour with a majority reduced by over 11,000. The Liberal Democrats overtook the Conservatives for second place, with an 11% swing. The British National Party and independent local campaigner Paul Gittins both retained their deposits. The turnout for the by-election was down by 13.23 percentage points in comparison with 2005.

2007 Sedgefield by-election
Party	Candidate	Votes	%	±%
Labour	Phil Wilson	12,528	44.8	–14.1
Liberal Democrats	Greg Stone	5,572	19.9	+8.0
Conservative	Graham Robb	4,082	14.6	+0.2
BNP	Andrew Spence	2,494	8.9	New
Independent	Paul Gittins	1,885	6.7	New
UKIP	Toby Horton	536	1.9	+0.3
Green	Chris Haine	348	1.2	New
English Democrat	Stephen Gash	177	0.6	New
Christian	Tim Grainger	177	0.6	New
Monster Raving Loony	Alan Hope	129	0.5	+0.1
Anti Crime	Norman Scarth	34	0.1	New
Majority		6,956	24.9	–19.6
Turnout		27,962	41.6	–20.6
Labour hold		Swing		

== General Election 2005 result ==
General election 2005: Sedgefield
Party	Candidate	Votes	%	±%
Labour	Tony Blair	24,421	58.9	–6.0
Conservative	Al Lockwood	5,972	14.4	–6.5
Liberal Democrats	Robert Browne	4,935	11.9	+2.9
Independent	Reg Keys	4,252	10.3	New
UKIP	William Brown	646	1.6	–0.8
National Front	Mark Farrell	253	0.6	New
Veritas	Fiona Luckhurst-Matthews	218	0.5	New
Independent	Berony Abraham	205	0.5	New
Monster Raving Loony	Melodie Staniforth	157	0.4	New
Blair Must Go Party	Jonathan Cockburn	103	0.2	New
Senior Citizens	Terry Pattinson	97	0.2	New
UK Pensioners Party	Cherri Gilham	82	0.2	New
Independent	Helen John	68	0.2	–0.4
Independent	John Barker	45	0.1	New
Independent	Julian Brennan	17	0.0	New
Majority		18,449	44.5	+0.5
Turnout		41,475	62.2	+0.2
Labour hold		Swing	–0.2	
