= Joseph Slater, Baron Slater =

Joseph Slater, Baron Slater, BEM (13 June 1904 – 21 April 1977) was a Labour Party politician in the United Kingdom.

He was elected as member of parliament (MP) for Sedgefield in County Durham at the 1950 general election, following the retirement of John Leslie. Slater held the seat until he retired from the House of Commons at the 1970 general election. In Harold Wilson's Labour government, 1964–1970, he served as Assistant Postmaster-General from 1964 to 1969, serving under four Postmasters-General: Tony Benn, Edward Short, Roy Mason and John Stonehouse.

On 8 July 1970 he was created a life peer as Baron Slater, of Ferryhill in the County of Durham.

Parliament of the United Kingdom
Preceded by John Leslie	Member of Parliament for Sedgefield; 1950–1970	Succeeded by David Reed
Political offices
Preceded by Ray Mawby	Assistant Postmaster-General; 1964–1969	Succeeded by (position abolished)
Preceded by (new position)	Parliamentary Secretary to the Minister of Posts and Telecommunications; 1969	Succeeded by Norman Pentland
