= Tony Blair (disambiguation) =

Tony Blair (born 1953) was Prime Minister of the United Kingdom from 1997 to 2007.

Tony Blair may also refer to:

- Tony Blair Faith Foundation, an organisation founded by Tony Blair aimed at countering religious extremism
- The Trial of Tony Blair, a 2007 television film
- The Hunt for Tony Blair, a 2011 episode of The Comic Strip Presents...
- The Prisoner or: How I Planned to Kill Tony Blair, a 2007 documentary by American filmmaker Michael Tucker
- Tony Blair, the principal character from the 1980 BBC television series Buccaneer played by Bryan Marshall
- "Tony Blair" (song), by Chumbawamba

== See also ==
- Anthony Blair (disambiguation)
- Tonibler, a male given name in Kosovo
