= Trimdon Labour Club =

Former bar and Labour Club

- Location within County Durham
- Former names: Trimdon Working Men's Club

General information
- Status: Closed
- Type: Constituency Labour Club
- Location: 22 Front Street South; Trimdon; County Durham; TS29 6LZ
- Coordinates: 54.7015°N 1.4296°W
- Opened: 1993
- Closed: 2010

Trimdon Labour Club was a bar and local branch of Sedgefield Labour Party in the village of Trimdon, County Durham in England. It opened in 1993, as a conversion of a former working men's club. It was the local Labour Club of former British Prime Minister Tony Blair, who lived in nearby Trimdon Colliery.

== History ==
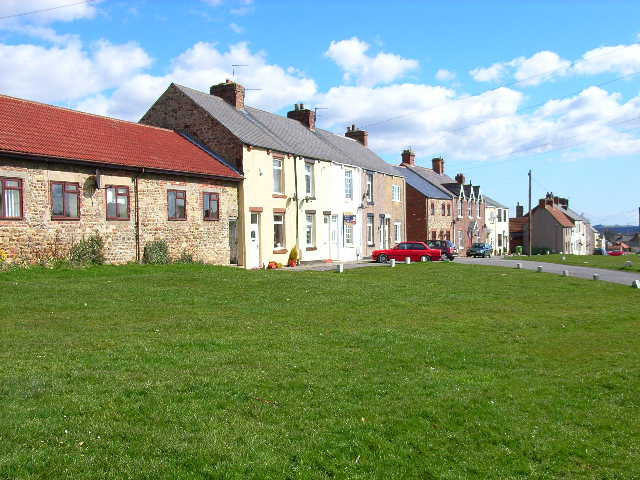
The village green in Trimdon; the Labour Club is nearby

Trimdon Labour Club opened in its former state as a working men's club in 1919, serving beer to mineworkers from a barrel in a farmer's cottage. It fell into disrepair in the 1980s, before the local Constituency Labour Party took on the running of the club.

It was opened in its repurposed state in 1993 by former Labour Leader Neil Kinnock, with the help of a £350 loan from Sedgefield Labour Party. A year later, in 1994, then-Shadow Home Secretary and MP for Sedgefield Tony Blair announced that he would stand to be Leader of the Labour Party. He succeeded, replacing John Smith, who had died suddenly of a heart attack.

== Rise to fame ==
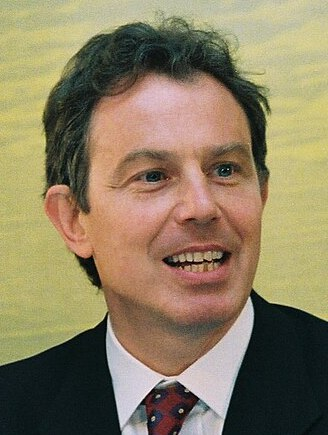
Tony Blair in 1997

In 1997, Tony Blair became Prime Minister following a landslide election, ending 18 years of Conservative rule. His victory speech came from the stage inside the club, sweeping the Labour Party into power and Blair into Number 10 Downing Street. The next year, Blair accompanied French Prime Minister Lionel Jospin for a pint of beer in the bar, and in 1999 a phone call was received from US President Bill Clinton, to which the barmaid asked customers: "Is Tony Blair in?" Blair's agent, John Burton asked who it was, and the barmaid replied that it was "someone called Clinton".

Five years later, Clinton's successor George W. Bush and First Lady Laura Bush called into the club on a visit to the UK with Blair and his wife Cherie. In June 2007, Blair announced his resignation from the same stage as his election victory speech 10 years earlier, to a crowd of local Labour supporters and anti-war protesters. He returned the next year to make a speech in support of Gordon Brown, who was elected Prime Minister after Blair's resignation.

== Demise ==
In 2010, three years after Blair gave up his Sedgefield seat, Trimdon Labour Club closed, citing reasons including the increase in satellite television, the smoking ban and cheap supermarket alcohol, all of which reduced custom to the club. The decision was confirmed after the new Conservative Chancellor of the Exchequer George Osborne announced a hike in the rate of VAT in that year's budget, making staying open unrealistic. The £350 loan from Sedgefield Labour Party was repaid, and the club's secretary Paul Trippet announced that the club would close on 22 July 2010. The former club is now a carpet shop.
