= Anthony Blair (disambiguation) =

Anthony Blair or Tony Blair (born 1953) is a former prime minister of the United Kingdom.

Anthony Blair may also refer to:

- J. Anthony Blair (1941–2024), Canadian philosopher

== See also ==
- Blair (surname)
- Tony Blair (disambiguation)
