= Fatjon Bushati =

Kosovan footballer

Personal information
- Date of birth: 6 May 1998 (age 28)
- Place of birth: Prizren, FR Yugoslavia
- Position: Defensive midfielder

Team information
- Current team: Ahrweiler BC
- Number: 24

Youth career
- –2017: Shkëndija Tiranë

Senior career*
Years	Team	Apps	(Gls)
2017–2018	Ballkani		
2018	Besa Kavajë	5	(0)
2018–2019	Ballkani	0	(0)
2019	Besa Pejë	0	(0)
2019–	Ahrweiler BC	83	(4)
- * Club domestic league appearances and goals as of 11 October 2024

Fatjon Bushati (born 6 May 1998) is a Kosovan footballer who plays as a defensive midfielder for German club Ahrweiler BC.

== Club career ==
Bushati joined Albanian side Besa Kavajë in January 2018 from KF Ballkani alongside compatriot Bler Thaçi, who joined from KF KEK.

== Career statistics ==
=== Club ===
As of 22 July 2018.

Club	Season	League			Cup		Continental		Other		Total	
Club	Season	Division	Apps	Goals	Apps	Goals	Apps	Goals	Apps	Goals	Apps	Goals
Besa Kavajë	2017–18	Albanian First Division	5	0	0	0	–		0	0	5	0
Career total			5	0	0	0	0	0	0	0	5	0
