= Thaçi (surname) =

Thaçi is a surname. Notable people with the surname include:

- Adelina Thaçi, Kosovar singer and teacher
- Bler Thaçi (born 1999), Kosovar football midfielder
- Hashim Thaçi (born 1969), Kosovar politician and war criminal
- Ilirjan Thaçi (1995–2012), football defender
- Menduh Thaçi, North Macedonian politician
- Muhamed Thaçi (born 1981), North Macedonian-born basketball coach and former player
