= Bler Thaçi =

Kosovar footballer

Personal information
- Date of birth: 4 August 1999 (age 27)
- Place of birth: Obilić, Kosovo under UN administration
- Position: Midfielder

Team information
- Current team: 2 Korriku

Youth career
- 2005–2015: KF KEK

Senior career*
Years	Team	Apps	(Gls)
2015–2018	KEK		
2018–2019	Besa Kavajë	32	(5)
2020-2021	KEK		
2021-	FC 2 Korriku		
- * Club domestic league appearances and goals as of 11:00, 22 July 2018 (UTC)

Bler Thaçi (Note: Also transliterated as Thaqi) (born 4 August 1999) is a Kosovar professional footballer who plays as a midfielder for KEK.

== Club career ==
Thaçi gained recognition in 2013 as the "best under-15 player in Kosovo". He began training with Galatasaray S.K in January 2014. He defected from KF KEK to KF Besa Kavajë in January 2018 alongside compatriot Fatjon Bushati, who joined from KF Ballkani. He returned to KEK in December 2019.

== Personal life ==
Thaçi is named after former British prime minister Tony Blair.

== Career statistics ==
=== Club ===
As of 22 July 2018.

Club	Season	League			Cup		Continental		Other		Total	
Club	Season	Division	Apps	Goals	Apps	Goals	Apps	Goals	Apps	Goals	Apps	Goals
Besa Kavajë	2017–18	Albanian First Division	9	3	0	0	–		0	0	9	3
Besa Kavajë	2018–19	Albanian First Division	0	0	0	0	–		0	0	0	0
Career total			9	3	0	0	0	0	0	0	9	3
