= 1974–75 Rheinlandliga =

1. Amateurliga Rheinland
- Season: 1974–75
- Champions: Eintracht Trier
- Relegated: Ahrweiler BC, SpVgg Bendorf, SG Eintracht Lahnstein, SC Sinzig

The 1974–75 Rheinlandliga was the 23rd season of the highest amateur class of the Rhineland Football Association under the name of 1. Amateurliga Rheinland. It was a predecessor of today's Rheinlandliga.

== Results ==
Eintracht Trier became Rheinland Champion, who finished second in the relegation round of the 2. Bundesliga south, South-West Group, and therefore had to play in the Amateur league in the coming season. VfL Neuwied represented Rhineland in the 1975 German Football Amateur Championship 1975 and lost in the first round to SpVgg Ludwigsburg (Württemberg). Ahrweiler BC, SpVgg Bendorf, SG Eintracht Lahnstein and SC Sinzig moved down to the 2. Amateur league. For the following 1975–76 season, Alemannia Plaidt, SpVgg EGC Wirges and SV Speicher moved up from the 2. Amateur league.

| Rank | Clubs | Games | Goals | Points |
|---|---|---|---|---|
| 1. | Eintracht Trier | 32 | 63:29 | 44:20 |
| 2. | VfL Neuwied | 32 | 82:43 | 43:21 |
| 3. | SV Leiwen | 32 | 65:40 | 42:22 |
| 4. | Sportfreunde Eisbachtal | 32 | 76:39 | 41:23 |
| 5. | TuS Neuendorf | 32 | 47:32 | 39:25 |
| 6. | FC Bitburg | 32 | 55:46 | 36:28 |
| 7. | TuS Mayen | 32 | 44:45 | 34:30 |
| 8. | SV Remagen | 32 | 50:68 | 30:34 |
| 9. | SV Ellingen | 32 | 50:58 | 29:35 |
| 10. | SpVgg Andernach | 32 | 41:59 | 29:35 |
| 11. | SC 07 Bad Neuenahr | 32 | 48:52 | 28:36 |
| 12. | VfB Wissen | 32 | 59:63 | 27:37 |
| 13. | TuS Bad Marienburg | 32 | 44:61 | 27:37 |
| 14. | Ahrweiler BC | 32 | 54:72 | 24:40 |
| 15. | SpVgg Bendorf | 32 | 54:75 | 24:40 |
| 16. | SG Eintracht Lahnstein | 32 | 38:60 | 24:40 |
| 17. | SC Sinzig | 32 | 47:75 | 23:41 |

| | Division Champion |
| | Relegation to 2. Amateur League |
| (M) | Previous year's champions |
| (A) | Previous year's descendants from the 2nd Division |
| (N) | Previous year's climbers from the 2. Amateur League |
