= On Leadership =

2024 book by Tony Blair

On Leadership: Lessons for the 21st Century is a 2024 book by Tony Blair. His first book since 2010, it focuses on his advice for political leaders - based on his experiences as the Prime Minister of the United Kingdom between 1997 and 2007. As well as covering direct political leadership, it touches on the personal burdens of senior officials, from dealing with the pressures of social media to creating work-life balance in a demanding career.

== Reception ==
The book was generally well-received, with politicians from Labour and other political parties praising its valuable lessons and messages, and suggesting that it would be helpful for aspiring politicians, while also remarking on how it failed to fully cover his own experiences.

George Osborne wrote "what this book captures about Blair is not just his mastery of the political arts, but his infectious optimism about politics itself."

Nicola Sturgeon wrote "On Leadership would have been enriched immeasurably had he included a couple of case studies from his time in office, occasions when he struggled to follow his own advice, with some insight into how he managed – or failed – to get back on track."
