= John Burton (political agent) =

British political agent and local politician (1940–2026)

John Burton (8 September 1940 – 6 February 2026) was a British political agent and local politician who was a Labour Party councillor in County Durham, England. He was a member of Sedgefield Borough Council, representing the ward of Fishburn and Old Trimdon. He was the constituency agent of former British Prime Minister Tony Blair, who represented the Sedgefield constituency from 1983 until standing down as prime minister in 2007.

== Relationship with Tony Blair ==
Burton was one of the first to spot the potential of the young Tony Blair. When the new Sedgefield constituency was created for the 1983 general election, which included Burton's home of Trimdon, the local Labour Party found themselves needing to appoint a candidate for the forthcoming election at short notice. Blair, then a London-based barrister, identified Burton as a branch secretary willing to consider his candidature and travelled to Trimdon (Burton's power base) to put his case. Blair secured the nomination, was elected an MP and began his political rise.

The Sunday newspaper The Observer reported in December 2007 that Burton planned to write a book about Tony Blair, focusing on his faith. However, to date, this has not materialised.

== Later career ==
Burton was suspended by Sedgefield Borough Council for one month in 2007 after threatening the former Deputy Leader of the Council that he would be deselected if he voted against a planning application. Burton was a strong critic of Jeremy Corbyn's leadership of the Labour Party, saying before the 2017 general election that he couldn't see Labour forming a Government for 30 years. Following the Labour Party's historic loss at the 2019 general election, he blamed Corbyn for the loss of Blair's former Sedgefield seat, citing Brexit and the public's mistrust of the leadership, confessing that, even though he had voted Labour, he did not wish to see a Corbyn-led government. He also encouraged centrist Labour MPs to split from the left-leaning leadership to form a new party.

== Personal life and death ==
Burton was born in Trimdon on 8 September 1940. According to Sedgefield Council's Register of Members' Interests, Burton was a member of the Transport and General Workers' Union, a church warden, and a governor of Trimdon College. Prior to politics, he was a physical education teacher. John Burton's biography is called The Grit in the Oyster.

Burton died at his home on 6 February 2026, at the age of 85.
