= Trimdon Colliery =

Village in County Durham, England

Coordinates: 54.718239°N 1.413386°W

- Location within County Durham
- OS grid reference: NZ 379 361
- Unitary authority: County Durham
- Ceremonial county: County Durham
- Region: North East
- Country: England
- Sovereign state: United Kingdom
- Post town: TRIMDON STATION
- Postcode district: TS29
- Police: Durham
- Fire: County Durham and Darlington
- Ambulance: North East
- UK Parliament: Sedgefield

Trimdon Colliery is a village in County Durham, in England. It is situated a few miles to the west of Hartlepool, and a short distance to the north of Trimdon. Its most famous resident was the former Prime Minister, Tony Blair.
