= Trimdon =

Village in County Durham, England

Coordinates: 54.7017°N 1.4284°W

- Location within County Durham
- Population: 2,958 (2011)
- OS grid reference: NZ369342
- Civil parish: Trimdon
- Unitary authority: County Durham
- Ceremonial county: County Durham
- Region: North East
- Country: England
- Sovereign state: United Kingdom
- Post town: TRIMDON STATION
- Postcode district: TS29
- Dialling code: 01429
- Police: Durham
- Fire: County Durham and Darlington
- Ambulance: North East
- UK Parliament: Newton Aycliffe and Spennymoor

Trimdon is a village in County Durham, in England.

== Name and etymology ==
The name Trimdon is recorded in the forms Tremeldon (1196) and Tremedon (1262) during the Medieval era. It appears to be of Old English origin, with the a meaning of "cross on the hill" or "wooden cross hill", derived from the elements trēow ("tree, wood") + mael ("a cross") + dūn ("a hill"). The term trēow (> "tree") appears in reference to a cross in some place names (e.g. Oswestry, Shropshire).

== Details ==
It is 9 miles west of Hartlepool, and adjacent to Trimdon Colliery, Trimdon Grange and Deaf Hill (also known as Trimdon Station). Locally, to distinguish it from these, it is known as Trimdon Village, or simply "The Village".

The main focal point of "The Village" is Saint Mary Magdalene church, which was constructed during the Norman period (approximately 1145 CE).

Trimdon Labour Club (now closed) was the setting for some of the former prime minister and constituency MP Tony Blair's constituency speeches. Blair's constituency home was in nearby Trimdon Colliery.
