= Apollinarisstadion =

Football ground in Rhineland-Palatinate, Germany

Coordinates: 50.5436°N 7.1514°E

- Apo
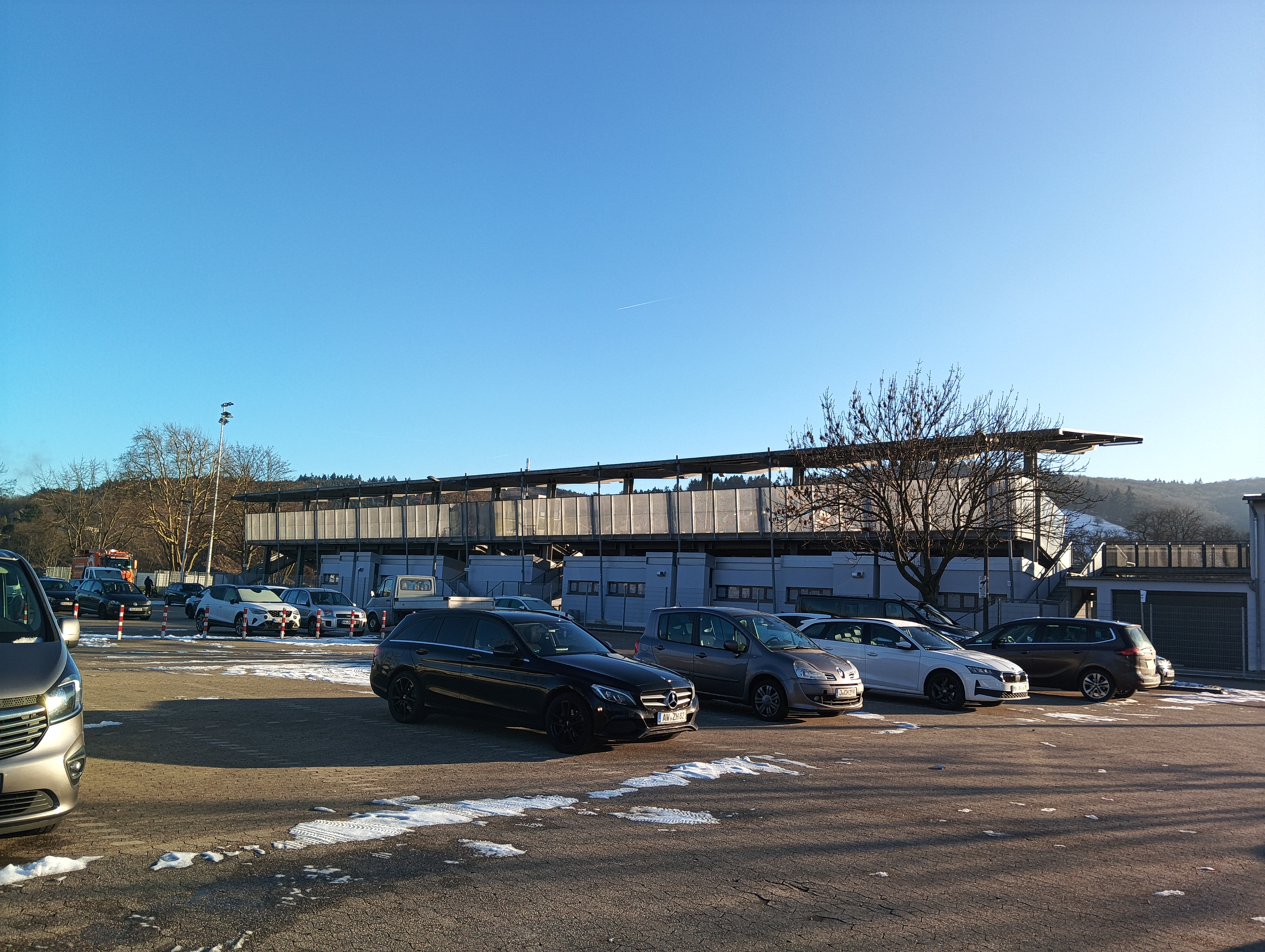
- Location: Kreuzstraße 110; Neuenahr; Bad Neuenahr-Ahrweiler; 53474
- Owner: City of Bad Neuenahr-Ahrweiler
- Capacity: 4,558

Tenants
- SC 13 Bad Neuenahr (2013–present); SC 07 Bad Neuenahr (until 2013); Ahrweiler BC; TuS Ahrweiler

The Apollinarisstadion is a football ground located in the city of Bad Neuenahr-Ahrweiler, Rhineland-Palatinate.

It was the homeground of former Women's Bundesliga team SC 07 Bad Neuenahr until the dissolvement of the club in 2013. Since then, the ground is used by its successor club SC 13 Bad Neuenahr which is playing in the Regionalliga Südwest, the third-tier league in German women's football.

The Apollinarisstadion serves as the homeground for the men's football team Ahrweiler BC and the track team TuS Ahrweiler.

== Specifications ==
The capacity of the Apollinarisstadion is at 4,558. The stadium includes a running track with six tracks. The playing area is natural lawn. The ground features under-soil heating. Next to the Apollinarisstadion is a second playing ground.

== During the flood 2021 ==
The Apollinarisstadion was severely damaged as a result of the Ahr flooding between July 14–17, 2021. In April 2022 it was announced that the Apollinarisstadion will be reconstructed. The Dr. Matthias & Moors Planungsgesellschaft from Taunusstein was tasked for the reconstruction of the football ground which will be realized using the reconstruction funds. The initial re-opening was slated to be in early of 2023. In February 2024, the total reconstruction costs was estimated with more than 5 million EUR.

The middle playing ground was re-opened on June 11, 2023. During the first weeks after the floods the ground was used as rubble place. During the re-opening of the middle playing ground the main ground was still in reconstruction. On the western playing ground a provisional container village consisting out of 48 (out of 64) tiny houses was constructed for more than 4 million EUR for the people who lost their homes after the floods. At was announced that the container village will be deconstructed in 2024 so the Western playing-ground can be reconstructed.

About two years after the flood, the Regionalliga football team SC 13 Bad Neuenahr was still unable to play their home matches at Apollinarisstadion and had to play their competition matches at Nettetalstadion in Mayen. The team played their home matches in Mayen until the end of 2024. Their first match at Apollinarisstadion after the floods took place on November 3, 2024 against TuS Issel.

== Notable matches ==
The Germany women's national football team played a friendly match against the Netherlands on April 1, 1987, which ended in a 3–1 win for Germany.

On June 26, 2007, a friendly match between Germany women's national under-23 football team and Norway women's national under-23 football team was held at the Apollinarisstadion which was won by Germany (1–0).

== Links ==
- sc13badneuenahr.de: Stadion auf der Website des SC 13 Bad Neuenahr
- europlan-online.de: Apollinaris-Stadion – Bad Neuenahr-Ahrweiler
- stadionwelt.de; Bildergalerie
