= Tonibler =

Male given name

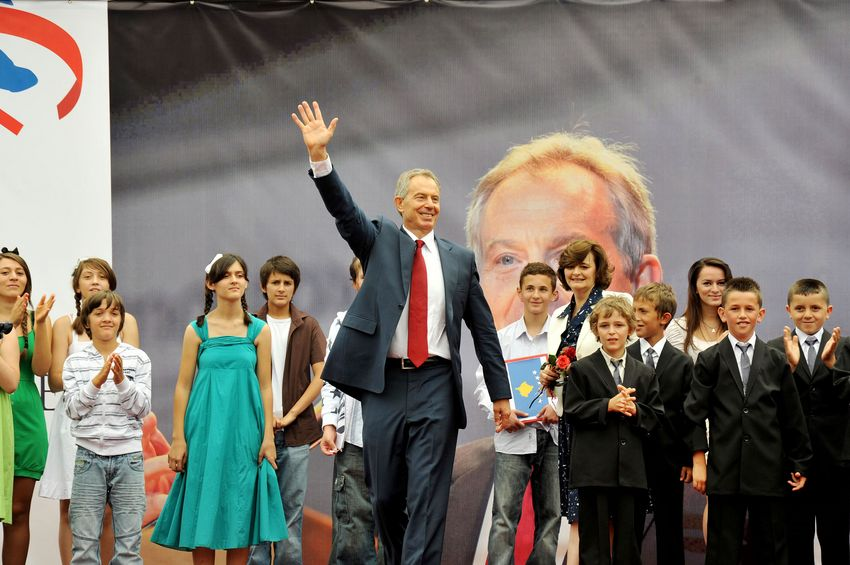
- Tony Blair in Kosovo, 9 July 2010, meeting children named after him
- Gender: Male

Origin
- Origin: Former British prime minister Tony Blair
- Region of origin: Kosovo

Other names
- Variant forms: Toni, Bler

Tonibler is a male given name in Kosovo, given in honour of Tony Blair, the former British prime minister, following his role in the 1999 NATO air campaign against the Federal Republic of Yugoslavia during the Kosovo War. Blair was considered instrumental in removing Slobodan Milošević from power, and boys born following the war were sometimes given the name Toni or Tonibler.

In 2010, Blair made a visit to Kosovo where he met several boys bearing the name. He returned to the country in June 2024, where he met five adult men with the name alongside Kosovan president Vjosa Osmani.

Other names such as Klinton and Madeleine, from U.S. President Bill Clinton and U.S. Secretary of State Madeleine Albright respectively, are also popular in Kosovo for similar reasons.

== People ==
- Bler Thaçi, Kosovar football player

== See also ==
- 1999 NATO bombing of Yugoslavia
