= Ahrweiler BC =

German football club

- Full name: Ahrweiler Ballspiel-Club 1920 e.V.
- Founded: 1920
- Ground: Apollinarisstadion
- Capacity: 4.558
- Manager: Markus Pazurek
- League: Oberliga Rheinland-Pfalz/Saar (V)
- 2025–26: Rheinlandliga (VI), 1st (champions and promoted)
Home colours	Away colours

Ahrweiler BC is a German football club from the city of Bad Neuenahr-Ahrweiler, Rheinland-Pfalz. The club was established in January 1920 as Fußballverein Ahrweiler and adopted the name Ahrweiler Ballspiel-Club on 10 March 1925.

== History ==
Following World War II BC merged with gymnastics and sports club Turn- und Sport 1898 Ahrweiler to form Rasen-Vereinigung 98 Ahrweiler. That union lasted until 23 March 1949 when the two clubs again went their separate ways. BC has remained an unheralded local side for most of its existence having made just two single season appearances in the Amateurliga Rheinland (III) in 1972–73 and 1974–75. Tied for 13th place with VfB Lützel and Eintracht Höhr-Grenzhausen at the end of the 1973 season Ahrweil lost a relegation play-off and was sent down. Their 1974–75 campaign was also unsuccessful and it too ended in relegation.

The club became a founding member of the Verbandsliga Rheinland (IV) in 1978 and stayed in this league until 1986, a fourth place in 1981–82 being its best result. It earned promotion back to this league in 1987, finishing runners-up to VfB Wissen in its first season back. In 1995–96, the club finished third in the league but in 1999, it suffered another relegation, back to the Bezirksliga.

In 2006, BC joined SC 07 Bad Neuenahr in a sports co-operative known as SG Ahrweiler/Bad Neuenahr which fields combined first and second teams. The club played in the tier seven Bezirksliga Rheinland-Mitte until consecutively being relegated in 2013 and 2014 but recovered with a league championship in the Kreisliga B Ahr in 2015–16. In 2018 the club played in Bezirksliga Mitte and became the League's winning team, getting promoted to the Rheinlandliga. In their first season 2018/19 Ahrweiler BC ranked second place being qualified to the Qualification matches against FV Dudenhofen and SF Köllerbach.

In 2022, Ahrweiler advanced to the Rheinlandpokal quarter finals where the team was defeated 4-1 against FC Karbach. The same season, Ahrweiler managed to become champions of the Rheinlandliga. Ahrweiler was promoted to play in the Fußball-Oberliga Rheinland-Pfalz/Saar for the first time in the teams' history. Due to the COVID-19 outbreak in Germany in 2020, the season was cancelled with no teams relegated which resulted in a reconstruction of the championship's format which was still in use when Ahrweiler joined the Oberliga. The team ranked 8th out of 11 teams in the North Division after the first part of the season which led Ahrweiler to play in the relegation group. At the end of the season, Ahrweiler ranked 18th of 22 teams and was relegated to Rheinlandliga.

In 2026, Ahrweiler managed to become champions of the Rheinlandliga for the second time after the team won 5-0 against SG Hochwald. In 2025, Mike Wunderlich signed a contract to become the teams' head coach. Despite having signed a contract until 2027, Wunderlich and Ahrweiler announced on 31 December 2025 that he and his assistant coach Kevin Rodrigues Pires left the club to join Wuppertaler SV as new coaches in Regionalliga West. Wunderlich was succeeded by Markus Pazurek who became a player-coach. In March 2026, Pazurek announced that he would leave Ahrweiler at the end of the season to join Solingen 03. In April 2026, Ahrweiler announced the signing of former professional football player Christopher Theisen as new head coach.
