= Marbles Reunited =

- Marbles Reunited Logo
- Abbreviation: MR
- Formation: Founded in 2001 by Richard Allan
- Purpose: To raise awareness for the reunification of the Parthenon Marbles
- Headquarters: London, UK
- Location(s): London, UK and Athens, Greece
- Official language: English
- Honorary President: Eddie O'Hara
- Chair: Andrew George MP
- Vice Chair: Rea Hajifanis
- Treasurer: Matthew Taylor
- Affiliations: British Committee for the Reunification of the Parthenon Marbles (BCRPM)
- Website: marblesreunited.org.uk
- Formerly called: Parthenon 2004

Marbles Reunited: Friends of the British Committee for the Reunification of the Parthenon Marbles is a campaign group, governed by charter and funded by donations from members and supporters, which lobbies and raises awareness about the case for the return of the Parthenon (Elgin) Marbles to Athens, Greece.

== History ==
The organization was set up in 2001 by Richard Allan, Liberal Democrats Member of Parliament for Sheffield Hallam and Archaeologist. Initially the campaign was called Parthenon 2004. The members of the committee hoped that the 2004 Olympic Games in Athens would act as a catalyst to renew interest and raise awareness about the reunification of the Parthenon Marbles. In 2005 the organization changed its name to Marbles Reunited to reflect the ongoing aspirations of the campaign, while not being tied to a specific date.

== Organisation ==
The current executive committee members are:

- Honorary President Eddie O’Hara
- Chair Andrew George
- Vice Chair Rea Hajifanis
- Treasurer Matthew Taylor
- Secretary Angelo Economou

Other members of the organisation include:

- David Hill, Australians for the Reunification of the Parthenon Sculptures and Chair of the International Association for the Reunification of the Parthenon Sculptures
- Christopher Miles, film director
- Geoffrey White, barrister
- Andrew Dismore Former British Labour Politician and London Assembly member
- Christopher Stockdale
- Apostolos Polyzoides
- Jean Polyzoides
- Maria Koutsikou, Campaign Manager for Marbles Reunited

The original members of the Committee were:

- Nicky Artemi, campaign manager
- Peter Derow, ancient historian
- David Hill, Australians for the Reunification of the Parthenon Sculptures
- Clare Makepeace, Parliamentary researcher
- Christopher Miles, film director
- Jerome Monahan, educationalist and journalist
- Edward O'Hara, Labour member of Parliament for Knowsley South
- William G. Stewart, broadcaster
- Matthew Taylor, architect
- Geoffrey White, barrister
- Malcolm Wright, internet consultant

== Activities ==
The members of Marbles Reunited have organised and/or had significant involvement in a large number of events throughout the United Kingdom and abroad.

- In 2009 Edward O'Hara set out an EDM (Early Day Motion) to lobby members of Parliament:

"That this House notes the forthcoming opening of the new Acropolis Museum in Athens in the spring of 2009; congratulates the Greek government on the completion of a truly world-class new home for the treasures of the Acropolis hill; recognises the unique beauty of the top floor gallery of the museum, built to the same size and orientation as the Parthenon itself and designed specifically for the display of the surviving Parthenon sculptures as an artistic unit and in the best possible location and light with the Parthenon itself in full simultaneous view; regrets the fact that for as long as the surviving Parthenon sculptures are kept separately in the British Museum and in Greece they cannot be viewed in this optimum context; and calls on the Government to encourage and facilitate the opening of discussions between the British Museum and the Greek authorities with the purpose of the reunification of the Parthenon sculptures in Athens with responsibility for their display, curation and study being shared between the British Museum and the new Acropolis Museum in accordance with the best contemporary museum practice."

- In July 2012 Chair Andrew George MP argued in favour of reunification of the Parthenon Marbles alongside Stephen Fry at the Intelligence Squared debate that took place at Cadogan Hall.
- Marbles Reunited is involved in ongoing meetings with the Greek Minister of culture.

== Affiliations ==
Marbles Reunited works closely with the British Committee for the Reunification of the Parthenon Marbles, another organisation that supports the return of the Parthenon (Elgin) Marbles to Athens, Greece. In 2008, Marbles Reunited was accepted as a member of the International Association for the Reunification of the Parthenon Sculptures.
