= Peter Derow =

American historian

Peter Sidney Derow (11 April 1944 – 9 December 2006) was Hody Fellow and Tutor in Ancient History at Wadham College, Oxford and University Lecturer in Ancient History from 1977 to 2006. As a scholar he was most noted for his work on Hellenistic and Roman Republican history and epigraphy, particularly on the histories of Polybius.

== Biography ==
Born in Newport, Rhode Island, Derow obtained his secondary education at the Roxbury Latin School in West Roxbury, Massachusetts. After an A.B. degree at Amherst (with Peter K. Marshall), he read for Greats as a second B.A. degree at Oxford in 1965–1967, achieving a First. At Oxford he was taught by, among others, W. G. (George) Forrest, who was a lasting influence. He completed a Ph.D. at Princeton on 'Rome and the Greek world from the earliest contacts to the end of the first Illyrian war', for which Professor J. V. A. Fine was his Advisor; in the preface to that work, he acknowledges the additional inspiration he had drawn from T. J. Luce and the historian and epigrapher C. Bradford Welles. After a spell of teaching at the University of Toronto, he returned to succeed Forrest at Wadham in 1977 when the latter was elected to the Wykeham Professorship of Ancient History at New College. In 2002–2005 Derow was also Director of Graduate Studies in ancient history for the Oxford Faculty of Classics.

He was a contributor to the Oxford Classical Dictionary in matters relating to the Hellenistic world and the Roman republic, and wrote the chapter on ‘Rome, the fall of Macedon and the sack of Corinth’ for the 2nd edition of the Cambridge Ancient History (volume 8; 1989). In this chapter, he expounded his view of Roman imperialism in the Greek East as harsh, a view he had earlier proposed in an article on Polybius and Roman imperialism; a more accessible version of these views can be found in his chapter in the Blackwell Companion to the Hellenistic world. These (and other papers) represent a sustained argument about the impact of Rome on the Hellenistic world, contesting the previously accepted views of Maurice Holleaux on the nature of Roman expansion and of Polybius' narrative of it. Later he co-edited (with Robert Parker) a memorial volume for George Forrest, Herodotus and his World (Oxford University Press, 2003). Many of his papers were published posthumously as Rome, Polybius, and the East, edited by Andrew Erskine and Josephine Crawley Quinn.

Probably his most accessible work is a volume of translated sources for Hellenistic history, co-edited with Roger S. Bagnall. First issued in 1981 as Greek Historical Documents: The Hellenistic Period (Chico, Calif.: Scholars Press), it was somewhat overshadowed by M. M. Austin’s comparable (and excellent) collection of sources, The Hellenistic World from Alexander to the Roman Conquest (Cambridge University Press, 1980). But ‘Bagnall & Derow’ had a distinctive tone, with its greater emphasis on inscriptions and papyrus texts, and it found favour with many students and teachers who used the two volumes together. Long unavailable, it was reissued (and updated) in a second edition in 2004, as The Hellenistic Period: Historical Sources in Translation (Oxford: Blackwell). It was typical of Derow to combine scholarly research with a passion for communicating his learning to the widest audience.

Derow was a strong supporter of the campaign to return the Parthenon (Elgin) marbles to Athens, Greece and was one of the original members of the Marbles Reunited campaign.

Derow died unexpectedly on 9 December 2006 in Oxford, England from a heart attack, after collapsing in Wadham College. His funeral, attended by a great many colleagues and former students, was held in Wadham College Chapel on 16 December 2006, followed by a memorial service in the Sheldonian Theatre on 28 April 2007.

A conference devoted to his memory, entitled 'Rome and the Mediterranean', was held at Wadham College from 2 to 4 April 2009.

== Selected works ==
- Rome, Polybius and the East, edited by A. Erskine and J. Crawley Quinn (Oxford: OUP, 2015)
- "The Arrival of Rome: From the Illyrian Wars to the Fall of Macedon", in A. Erskine (ed.), A Companion to the Hellenistic World (Oxford: Blackwell, 2003), pp. 51–70.
- (with R.S. Bagnall) Greek Historical Documents. The Hellenistic Period (Chico, Calif.: Scholars Press, 1981).
- (with R.S. Bagnall) The Hellenistic Period. Historical Sources in Translation (Oxford: Blackwell, 2004). ISBN 1-4051-0133-4
- (ed. with R. C. T. Parker) Herodotus and His World: Essays from a Conference in Memory of George Forrest (Oxford: OUP, 2003). ISBN 0-19-925374-9
- "Herodotus Readings", Classics Ireland, Vol. 2 (1995), pp. 29–51.
- "Historical Explanation: Polybius and His Predecessors", in S. Hornblower (ed.), Greek Historiography (New York: OUP, 1994), pp. 73–90.
- (with W.G. Forrest) "An inscription from Chios", Annual of the British School at Athens, Vol. 77 (1982), pp. 79–92.
- "Kleemporos", Phoenix, Vol. 27 (1973), pp. 118–134.
- "A New Inscription from Chios", in G. E. Malouchou and A. P. Matthaiou (eds.), Χιακον Συμποσιον. Εις μνημην W. G. Forrest (Athens, 2006), pp. 95–102.
- "Perseus", in S. Hornblower and A. J. Spawforth (eds.), Oxford Classical Dictionary, 3rd ed. (Oxford: OUP, 1996), pp. 1143–1144.
- "Pharos and Rome", Zeitschrift für Papyrologie und Epigraphik, Vol. 88 (1991), pp. 261–270.
- "Philip V", in S. Hornblower and A. J. Spawforth (eds.), Oxford Classical Dictionary, 3rd ed. (Oxford: OUP, 1996), p. 1162.
- "Polybios and the Embassy of Callicrates", Essays Presented to C. M. Bowra (Oxford: Alden Press, for Wadham College Junior and Middle Common Rooms, 1970), pp. 12–23.
- "Polybius", in T. J. Luce (ed.), Ancient Writers: Greece and Rome, Vol. 1 (New York: Charles Scribner's Sons, 1982), pp. 525–539.
- "Polybius", in S. Hornblower and A. J. Spawforth (eds.), Oxford Classical Dictionary, 3rd ed. (Oxford: OUP, 1996), pp. 1209–1211.
- "Polybius, Rome, and the East", Journal of Roman Studies, Vol. 69 (1979), pp. 1–15.
- "Pyrrhus", in S. Hornblower and A. J. Spawforth (eds.), Oxford Classical Dictionary, 3rd ed. (Oxford: OUP, 1996), p. 1283.
- (with J.T. Ma and A. Meadows) "RC 38 (Amyzon) reconsidered", Zeitschrift für Papyrologie und Epigraphik, Vol. 109 (1995), pp. 71–80.
- "The Roman Calendar, 190–168 B.C.", Phoenix, Vol. 27 (1973), pp. 345–356.
- "The Roman Calendar, 218–191 B.C.", Phoenix, Vol. 30 (1976), pp. 265–281.
- "Rome, the Fall of Macedon, and the Sack of Corinth", Cambridge Ancient History, 2nd edition, vol. 8 (Cambridge, 1989), pp. 290–323.
