= Matthew Taylor (architect) =

Matthew Taylor (born 18 July 1975 in Epsom) is an architect and campaigner for the return of the Elgin Marbles from the British Museum to Athens, Greece.

He is currently a member of the executive committee of Marbles Reunited and the International Association for the Reunification of the Parthenon Sculptures and has made television and radio appearances speaking on behalf of these organisations. He maintains a blog known as "elginism" about the return of disputed items of cultural property to their country of origin.
