= Sheffield Hallam =

Sheffield Hallam can refer to:

- Sheffield Hallam University, a university in Yorkshire, England
- Sheffield Hallam (UK Parliament constituency), a parliamentary constituency in Sheffield, England
