= Robert Parker (historian) =

British ancient historian (born 1950)

Robert Parker FBA
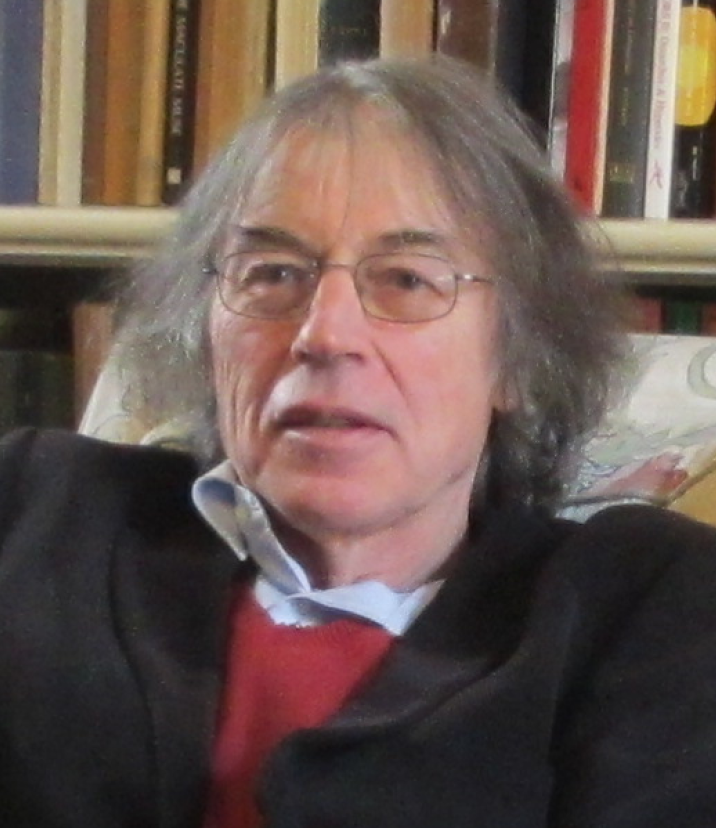
- Parker in 2013
- Born: Robert Christopher Towneley Parker; 19 October 1950 (age 76)
- Citizenship: United Kingdom

Academic background
- Education: New College, Oxford

Academic work
- Discipline: Classics
- Sub-discipline: Ancient history; Ancient Greece; ancient Greek religion; Greek epigraphy
- Institutions: Oriel College, Oxford; New College, Oxford; Faculty of Classics, University of Oxford

Robert Christopher Towneley Parker, FBA (born 19 October 1950) is a British historian of ancient Greece, specialising in ancient Greek religion and Greek epigraphy.

== Biography ==
Robert Parker was educated at St Paul's School, London and at New College, Oxford under Geoffrey de Ste Croix. From 1996 until his retirement in 2016 he was the Wykeham Professor of Ancient History at New College, Oxford University. Before that, from 1976–96, he was Tutor in Greek and Latin Languages and Literature at Oriel College, Oxford.

He was elected a Fellow of the British Academy in 1998. He is also a Foreign Member of the Royal Danish Academy of Sciences and Letters, an Officier of the Ordre des Palmes Académiques in France, and a Member of the Academia Europaea. In 2013 he was the 99th Sather Professor at the University of California, Berkeley.

== Select works ==
=== Books ===
- Miasma: Pollution and Purification in Early Greek religion. Oxford, 1983. ISBN 9780198147428
- Athenian Religion: A History. Oxford (Clarendon Press), 1996. ISBN 0-19-814979-4
- Polytheism and Society at Athens. Oxford, 2005. ISBN 9780199216116
- On Greek Religion. Ithaca, NY, 2011. ISBN 0801477352.
- Greek Gods Abroad : Names, Natures, and Transformations. Berkely, CA, 2017. ISBN 9780520293946

=== Edited works ===
- (ed. with Peter Derow) Herodotus and His World: Essays from a Conference in Memory of George Forrest. Oxford: 2003. ISBN 9780199253746
- (ed. with J. Ma and N. Papazarkadas) Interpreting the Athenian empire. London, 2009. ISBN 9780715637845
- (ed. with Christiane Sourvinou-Inwood) Athenian myths and festivals: aglauros, erechtheus, plynteria, panathenaia, dionysia. New York, NY, 2011. ISBN 9780199592074
- (ed.) Personal Names in Ancient Anatolia Oxford University Press 2013. ISBN 9780197265635

=== Articles and chapters ===
- 'The Origins of Pronoia: A Mystery' in Apodosis: essays presented to Dr W.W. Cruickshank to mark his 80th birthday, 1992.
- ‘Early Orphism’ in A. Powell ed., The Greek World. London, 1995: 483-510.
- ‘Pleasing Thighs: Reciprocity in Greek Religion’ in Gill, C., N. Postlethwaite, & R. Seaford eds., Reciprocity in Ancient Greece. Oxford, 1998: 105-25.
- ‘Greek states and Greek oracles’ in Cartledge, P.A. & F.D. Harvey eds., Crux : essays presented to G. E. M. de Ste. Croix on his 75th birthday. History of Political Thought 6. Exeter, 1985. Republished in R.G.A. Buxton ed., Oxford Readings in Greek Religion. Oxford, 2000: 76-108.
- 'The Problem of the Greek Cult Epithet' in Opuscula Atheniensia 28 (2003).
- 'New 'Panhellenic' Festivals in Hellenistic Greece', in Schlesier, R. & U. Zellman (eds), Mobility and Travel in the Mediterranean from Antiquity to the Middle Ages, Münster 2004.
- 'What are Sacred Laws?' in Harris, E.M. & L. Rubinstein (eds) The Law and the Courts in Ancient Greece, Duckworth 2004.
- 'A New Funerary Gold Leaf from Pherae', Archeologiki Efimeris, 2004.
- 'Sale of a Priesthood on Chios' in Chiakon Simposion is mnimin W.G. Forrest, Eliniki Epigrafiki Eteria, Athens, 2006.
- 'Patroioi theoi: The Cults of Sub-groups and Identity in the Greek World' in Rasmussen, A.H. & S.W. (eds), Religion and Society: Rituals, Resources and Identity in the Ancient Graeco-Roman World, Rome 2008.
- 'Tis ho thuon?' in Lydie Bodiou, Véronique Mehl, Jacques Oulhen, Francis Prost et Jérôme Wilgaux (eds.) Chemin faisant. Mythes, cultes et société en Grèce ancienne. Mélanges en l’honneur de Pierre Brulé, 2009.
- 'Subjection, Synoecism, and Religious Life', in Funke, P & N. Luraghi (eds), The Politics of Ethnicity and the Crisis of the Peloponnesian League, Harvard University Press 2009.
- ‘A Funerary Foundation from Hellenistic Lycia’, Chiron, 40 (2010): 103-120.
- 'Epigraphy and Greek Religion' in Epigraphy and the Historical Sciences. British Academy, 2012.
- 'Commentary on Journal of Cognitive Historiography, Issue 1', JCH 1.2 (2014) 186-192.
- 'The Lot Oracle at Dodona' Zeitschrift für Papyrologie und Epigraphik, 194 (2015), 111-114.
