= Richard Allan, Baron Allan of Hallam =

British politician and life peer (born 1966)

The Right Honourable The Lord Allan of Hallam
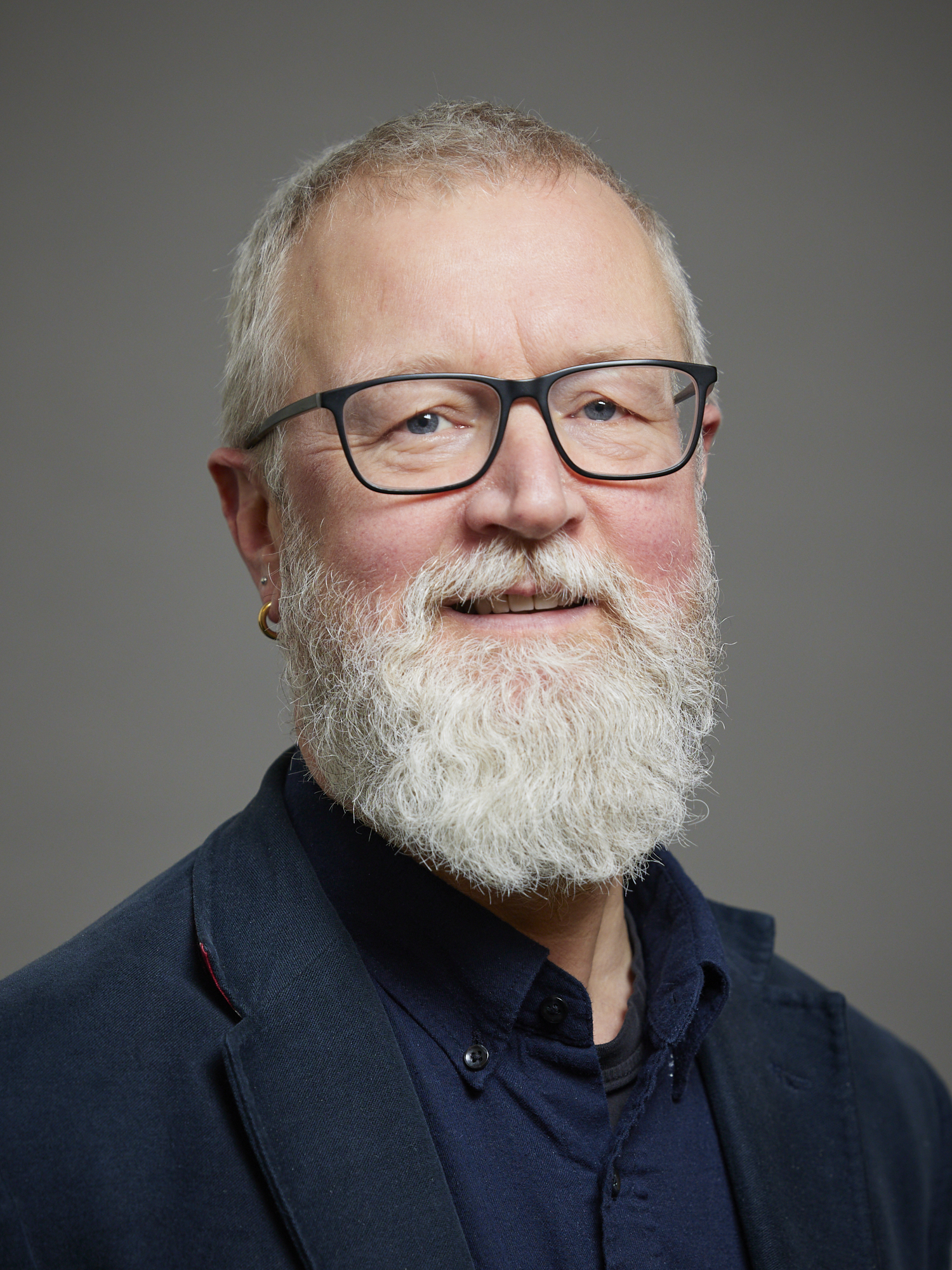
- Official portrait, 2023

Member of the House of Lords
- Lord Temporal
- Life peerage 22 July 2010

Member of Parliament for Sheffield Hallam
- In office 1 May 1997 – 11 April 2005
- Preceded by: Irvine Patnick
- Succeeded by: Nick Clegg

Personal details
- Born: Richard Beecroft Allan; 11 February 1966 (age 60) Sheffield, England
- Party: Non-affiliated (since October 2024)
- Other political affiliations: Liberal Democrats (until October 2024)
- Spouse: Louise Netley (separated)
- Education: Oundle School; Pembroke College, Cambridge; Bristol Polytechnic

Richard Beecroft Allan, Baron Allan of Hallam (born 11 February 1966), is a British politician. He was the Liberal Democrat Member of Parliament (MP) for Sheffield Hallam from 1997 to 2005. He was made a life peer in the 2010 Dissolution Honours; he joined the non-affiliated members of the House of Lords in 2024.

== Early life ==
Allan was born in Sheffield. He went to the independent Oundle School in north-east Northamptonshire. He studied at Pembroke College, Cambridge, and gained a BA in Archaeology and Anthropology in 1988. From Bristol Polytechnic, he gained an MSc in Information Technology in 1990. He was a field archaeologist in Britain, France and the Netherlands in 1984–1985, and in Ecuador in 1988–1989. He was a computer manager at Avon FHSA in 1991–1997.

== Parliamentary career ==
In 1997, Allan unseated Irvine Patnick of the Conservative Party achieving a majority of 8,221 with a swing of 15.3%. He was only the second non-Conservative to win Sheffield Hallam, and the first since 1918. In 2001, he was re-elected with an increased majority of 9,347. During his tenure, Allan held various committee seats, including the Chair of the House of Commons Information Select Committee and a seat on the House of Commons Liaison Select Committee. Richard Allan was the founding chairman of the Parthenon 2004 campaign for the return of the Parthenon Marbles.

Allan did not seek reelection at the 2005 general election. He was succeeded by future Lib Dem leader and Deputy Prime Minister Nick Clegg, for whom he acted as campaign manager.

On 22 July 2010, he was created a life peer as Baron Allan of Hallam, of Ecclesall in the county of South Yorkshire, and was introduced in the House of Lords on 26 July 2010, where he sat as a Liberal Democrat peer until October 2024, when he became non-affiliated.

== Post political career ==
From June 2009 to September 2019 Allan was employed by Facebook as Director of Policy in Europe, responsible for representing the company and lobbying EU governments on matters of concern to it. He was previously Head of Government Affairs for Cisco Systems UK. Allan has given various interviews responding to media concerns about Facebook, and in January 2012 he gave evidence to the Leveson Inquiry on Facebook's attitude to malicious posting and to privacy.

He is a visiting fellow of the Oxford Internet Institute and deputy chairman of the British Committee for the Reunification of the Parthenon Marbles.

== Personal life ==
Allan married Louise Netley on 25 May 1991 in Bath, Somerset. They have since separated. Allan has three daughters. Rosie Mae Allan, born on 30 September 1988, and twin daughters with his current partner.

Parliament of the United Kingdom
Preceded by Irvine Patnick	Member of Parliament for Sheffield Hallam; 1997–2005	Succeeded by Nick Clegg
Orders of precedence in the United Kingdom
Preceded by The Lord Faulks	Gentlemen; Baron Allan of Hallam	Followed by The Lord Browne of Ladyton
