= David Hill (businessman) =

English-born Australian businessman and historian

- Born: 1946 (age 79–80); Eastbourne, East Sussex, England
- Occupations: Businessman and author
- Political party: Australian Labor Party

David Hill (born 1946) is an English-born Australian business leader and author. He is best known for his role as chairman and managing director of the Australian Broadcasting Corporation (ABC) from 1987 to 1995. He has also been head of Soccer Australia and chair of Sydney Water. He stood as a Labor candidate in the 1998 federal election, but was not elected.

== Early life and education ==
Born out of wedlock in Eastbourne in 1946, into an impoverished family of four boys, David Hill and his twin brother spent time in Barnardo's children's home in Barkingside.

I can only remember it as traumatic. The idea of nurturing and care and affection and love just didn't enter the equation back in those days. I can remember Mum gave us some coloured writing paper so we could write to her. I remember the other kids stealing our paper, humiliating us, tearing it up and running away. It was only much later I realised a lot of this cruelty was that most of them didn't have anybody to write to.

— David Hill, interviewed in 2008.

Hill's early years of schooling were at Bourne Junior Primary School. He migrated to Australia together with his elder brother and twin brother in April 1959, aboard the SS Strathaird. His mother arrived in Australia a few years later. Prior to departing England, Hill and his brothers had enrolled to attend Fairbridge Farm School in Molong in the Central West region of New South Wales.

Hill has since written a book about the experiences of the child migrants. The documentary The Long Journey Home was aired on ABC TV on 17 November 2009, detailing some of the history associated with Fairbridge Farm School and other orphanages of that time. He also became a passionate and effective advocate for British and Australian Government recognition that child migrants had been poorly treated.

== Career ==
Prior to his rise to prominence in business circles, Hill was variously a hardware shop assistant, a sandwich cutter, a labourer on building sites, a refuse collector and gardener; he sold tennis coaching courses, worked as a barman, waiter, pub bouncer, delivery agent, tutor at the University of Sydney, journalist, investment bank worker, an accountant, and was in charge of the NSW Government Ministerial Advisory Unit.

Having in 1978 been appointed an associate commissioner of the Public Transport Commission in 1982, at 36 years of age, Hill was appointed as the chief executive of the State Rail Authority, serving until 1987. He remained as a director of the State Rail Authority until 1997.

Hill served as chairman and managing director of the Australian Broadcasting Corporation from 1987 to 1995, head of Soccer Australia, chairman of Sydney Water, director of the Australian National Airlines Commission and Chairman of CREATE, a national organisation responsible for representing the interests of young people and children in institutional care. A former North Sydney rugby league junior, Hill was president of the North Sydney Bears Rugby League Football Club between 1989 and 1992. He was instrumental in the eventual ban on cigarette sponsorship of the game.

Hill is strongly in favour of the return of the Elgin Marbles to Greece. As well as being a member of the British Marbles Reunited campaign, he is the founder and current chairman of the International Association for the Reunification of the Parthenon Sculptures.

He was an unsuccessful political candidate representing Labor for the Division of Hughes at the 1998 federal election.

Hill has written a number of non-fiction books on Australian history, including histories of the First Fleet, early colonial New South Wales, and the Australian gold rushes.

== Personal life ==
Hill married Stergitsa Zamagias in 1998, and together they have a son.

== Selected published works ==
- Hill, David (2007). The Forgotten Children: Fairbridge Farm School and Its Betrayal of Britain's Child Migrants to Australia. Australia: Random House. ISBN 978-1-74166-614-4.
- Hill, David (2008). 1788: The Brutal Truth of the First Fleet. Australia: Random House. ISBN 978-1-74166-797-4.
- Hill, David (2010). Gold - The fever that forever changed Australia. Australia: Random House. ISBN 978-1-74166-925-1.
- Hill, David (2013). The Great Race: The Race Between the English and the French to Complete the Map of Australia. Australia: Random House. ISBN 9781742751108.
- Hill, David (2014). The Making of Australia. Australia: William Heinemann. ISBN 9781742757667.
- Hill, David (2015). First Fleet Surgeon : The Voyage of Arthur Bowes Smyth. Canberra, ACT: National Library of Australia. ISBN 9780642278623.
- Hill, David (2015). Australia and The Monarchy. Australia: William Heinemann. ISBN 9780857987549.
- Hill, David (2017). The Fair and the Foul : Inside Our Sporting Nation. North Sydney: Penguin Random House Australia. ISBN 9780857987570.
- Hill, David (2019). Convict Colony: The Remarkable Story of the Fledgling Settlement That Survived Against the Odds. Australia: Allen & Unwin. ISBN 9781760528669.
- Hill, David (2022). Reckoning : The forgotten children and their quest for justice. Australia: William Heinemann Australia. ISBN 978-1-76104-552-3.

Media offices
Preceded by Ken Myer	Chair of the Australian Broadcasting Corporation; 1986–1987	Succeeded by Bob Somervaille
Preceded by Geoffrey Whitehead	Managing Director of the Australian Broadcasting Corporation; 1987–1995	Succeeded by Brian Johns
Government offices
Preceded by John McMurtrie	Chairman of Sydney Water Corporation; 1997–1998	Succeeded by Gabrielle Kibble
