= 1939 Sheffield Hallam by-election =

UK parliamentary by-election

The 1939 Sheffield Hallam by-election was a parliamentary by-election held in the United Kingdom on 10 May 1939 for the House of Commons constituency of Sheffield Hallam in Yorkshire. The Conservative Party held the seat.

== Previous result ==
General election, 14 November 1935: Sheffield Hallam
Party	Candidate	Votes	%	±%
Conservative	Louis Smith	21,298	67.3	−10.2
Labour	Grace Colman	10,346	32.7	+10.2
Majority		10,952	34.6	−20.4
Turnout		31,644	71.7	−8.6
Conservative hold		Swing	+10.2	

== Result ==
Sheffield Hallam by-election, 1939
Party	Candidate	Votes	%	±%
Conservative	Roland Jennings	16,033	61.7	−5.6
Labour	C. S. Darvill	9,939	38.3	+5.6
Majority		6,094	23.4	−11.2
Turnout		25,972	57.8	−13.9
Conservative hold		Swing	+5.6	

== Aftermath ==
In the 1945 general election,

General election 1945: Sheffield Hallam
Party	Candidate	Votes	%	±%
Conservative	Roland Jennings	15,874	47.1	−20.2
Labour	John Frederick Drabble	13,009	38.5	+5.8
Liberal	Gerald Abrahams	2,614	7.7	N/A
Communist	Gordon Cree	2,253	6.7	N/A
Majority		2,865	8.6	−26.0
Turnout		33,750	75.7	+4.0
Conservative hold		Swing	-13.0	
