= Irvine Patnick =

British politician (1929–2012)

Sir Irvine Patnick OBE

Lord Commissioner of the Treasury
- In office 25 July 1990 – 20 July 1994
- Prime Minister: Margaret Thatcher; John Major
- Preceded by: David Lightbown
- Succeeded by: Andrew Mitchell

Member of Parliament for Sheffield Hallam
- In office 11 June 1987 – 8 April 1997
- Preceded by: John Osborn
- Succeeded by: Richard Allan

Personal details
- Born: 11 October 1929 Sheffield, West Riding of Yorkshire, England
- Died: 30 December 2012 (aged 83) Sheffield, South Yorkshire, England
- Party: Conservative

Sir Cyril Irvine Patnick OBE (11 October 1929 – 30 December 2012) was a British businessman and Conservative Party politician.

He was knighted in 1994.

== Early life ==
The second of four sons born to Aaron Michael Patnick and Bessie (née Levin) Patnick in Sheffield, he was educated in Sheffield at the Central Technical School followed by Sheffield Polytechnic. A building contractor, Patnick entered politics as a member of Sheffield City Council in 1967 and later of South Yorkshire County Council.

== Parliamentary career ==
After unsuccessfully contesting Sheffield Hillsborough at the 1970 and 1979 general elections, he was elected as Member of Parliament for Sheffield Hallam in 1987. During his time as an MP he was a Lord Commissioner of Her Majesty's Treasury and deputy Chairman of the Channel Tunnel Rail Link Select committee. He left politics after he lost his seat in the 1997 general election to the Liberal Democrat Richard Allan.

Patnick was on the right wing of the Conservative Party. He was against sanctions on the apartheid regime in South Africa, voted to reintroduce the death penalty, strongly supported the anti-homosexual Section 28 of the Local Government Act and, in a similar vein, opposed reducing the age of consent for homosexuals. He coined the phrase 'People's Republic of South Yorkshire' in reference to the policies of the Sheffield City Council under the direction of David Blunkett.

He was the vice-president of Sheffield's Kingfield Synagogue, life president of Sheffield Jewish Representative Council, and a former national vice-chairman of the British Maccabi sports and youth organisation. Patnick was also the chairman of trustees of The Trust for Research into Freemasonry, a charity established to support the Centre for Research into Freemasonry and Fraternalism at the University of Sheffield.

=== Hillsborough controversy ===
Patnick was one of the sources for The Sun newspaper's inaccurate coverage of the Hillsborough disaster in April 1989. In September 2012, the publication of the report by the independent panel investigating the disaster confirmed that "the source for these despicable untruths was a Sheffield news agency reporting conversations with South Yorkshire Police and Irvine Patnick, the then MP for Sheffield Hallam". Earlier, Sun editor Kelvin MacKenzie had said of his coverage: "It was a fundamental mistake. The mistake was I believed what an MP said". The Daily Express also carried the story, under the headline "Police Accuse Drunken Fans" and giving Patnick's views, saying he had told Margaret Thatcher, who was being escorted by him on a tour of the grounds after the tragedy, of the "mayhem caused by drunks" and that policemen had told him that they were "hampered, harassed, punched and kicked".

Following the disclosure of Patnick's role in creating what Prime Minister David Cameron called an "unjust and untrue narrative that sought to blame the fans", Labour MP John Mann wrote to Cameron asking that Patnick be stripped of his knighthood for his "shameful and disgusting behaviour". Patnick was also heavily criticised by the families of the dead, with the Hillsborough Justice Campaign stating that "It needs to be remembered that this man vilified Liverpool and was part of a lying machine which shamefully damaged the reputation of those fans."

In a statement issued through the Conservative Party on 13 September 2012, Patnick accepted "responsibility for passing such information on without asking further questions. So, many years after this tragic event, I am deeply and sincerely sorry for the part I played in adding to the pain and suffering of the victims' families".

== Honours ==
Patnick was appointed Officer of the Order of the British Empire (OBE) in the 1981 New Year Honours, and knighted in 1994.

== Death ==
Patnick died on 30 December 2012 in Sheffield with his funeral taking place the following day.

Parliament of the United Kingdom
Preceded by John Osborn	Member of Parliament for Sheffield Hallam; 1987–1997	Succeeded by Richard Allan
