= Roland Jennings =

British politician (1894-1968)

Sir Roland Jennings (10 November 1894 – 5 December 1968) was a British chartered accountant and politician.

Jennings was born in Sunderland, the son of Jane Hannah Jennings and Cornelius Jennings. He served with the Durham Light Infantry in the First World War. He was elected as a Conservative Member of Parliament (MP) for Sedgefield in County Durham at the 1931 general election, defeating the Labour Party MP John Herriotts. Jennings was defeated at the 1935 general election by Labour's John Leslie. He is the last Conservative to serve as Member of Parliament (MP) for the constituency until Paul Howell in 2019

After losing the Wandsworth Central seat in a 1937 by-election, Jennings returned to the House of Commons in 1939, when he was elected as MP for Sheffield Hallam at a by-election following the death of Sir Louis William Smith. At this and each subsequent election he fought as a 'Conservative and Liberal' although he took the Conservative whip.

In 1955, Jennings was caught up in a minor constitutional difficulty when shortly after the general election a political opponent highlighted the fact that he had been, since 1923, a public auditor approved by the Treasury. He had taken the post solely in order to audit the books of the Cotherstone British Legion and Village Club, but there were circumstances in which he might have been paid by the Treasury: this would make it an "office of profit under the Crown" and therefore a disqualification from being elected.

The matter was referred by the House of Commons to a Select Committee which reported that Jennings was indeed disqualified under the law as it stood. The government rushed through Parliament a Bill changing the law, and another bill indemnifying Jennings from the consequences of acting as an MP while disqualified and validating his election. Several other MPs were similarly found to have been unknowingly disqualified in an ensuing investigation.

Jennings retired from Parliament at the 1959 general election.

Parliament of the United Kingdom
Preceded by John Herriotts	Member of Parliament for Sedgefield; 1931–1935	Succeeded by John Leslie
Preceded by Sir Louis Smith	Member of Parliament for Sheffield Hallam; 1939–1959	Succeeded by John Osborn
