= Attracta Rewcastle =

First female Commissioned Officer in the United Kingdom's Royal Navy

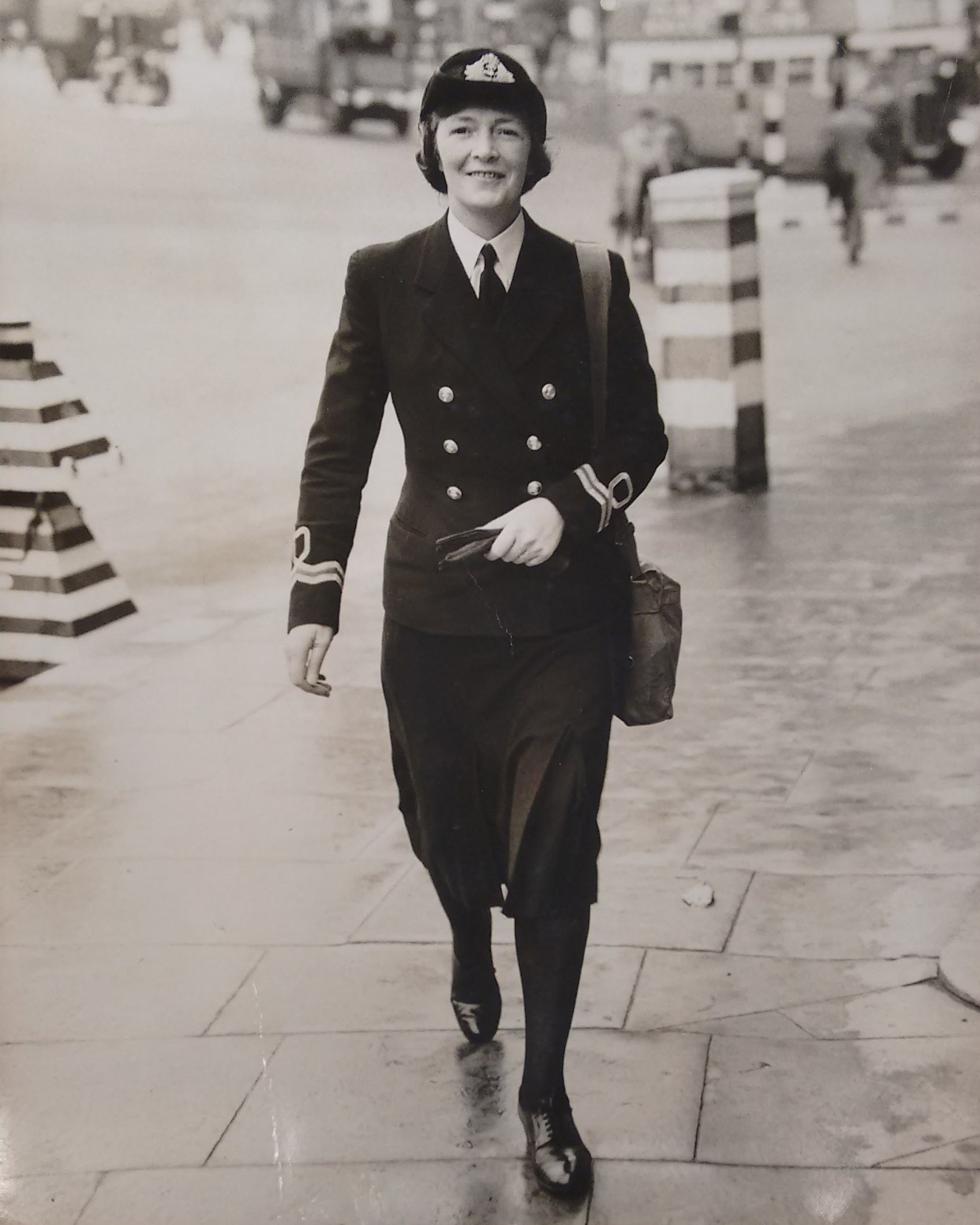
Rewcastle arriving at the Admiralty on her first day with the RNVR, 1940.

Attracta Genevieve Rewcastle (née Candon, 1897 – 18 February 1951) was an Irish-British doctor, politician, and the first female commissioned officer in the Royal Navy. Born in County Roscommon, Ireland, Rewcastle attended University College Dublin where she studied medicine. After working as an Assistant Schools Medical Officer in Sheffield, she went on to a position at Great Ormond Street Hospital, as well as working in private practice.

In the Second World War she joined the WRNS in 1940, and took up a position at the Admiralty as the Medical Superintendent of the WRNS. As a doctor in the WRNS, she was paid less than her male counterparts in the Royal Navy; the Medical Women's Federation objected to this, on the grounds that male and female doctors were paid equally elsewhere. As a result, Rewcastle was appointed to the Relative Rank of Surgeon-Lieutenant in the Royal Naval Volunteer Reserve in the summer of 1940, and on 5 December 1941, she was made Temporary Acting Surgeon Lieutenant. She was promoted to Temporary Acting Surgeon Lieutenant-Commander in 1943, and Temporary Surgeon Lieutenant-Commander in 1945. She was released (Class A) in 1946.

After the war, Rewcastle served as a Conservative Party councillor on Westminster Borough Council, and ran unsuccessfully as the Conservative candidate for St Pancras North at the 1949 London County Council election, and Willesden West at the 1950 United Kingdom general election.

In 1926, she married Cuthbert Snowball Rewcastle, a barrister and former Liberal politician, later to become a QC and judge. They had three children. Her son, Sub-Lieutenant Anthony Giles Candon Rewcastle, was lost with the submarine HMS Affray in 1951, the last Royal Navy submarine to be lost at sea. Her daughter, Rosalind Maskell, was a microbiologist.
