= Sheffield Hallam (constituency) =

Parliamentary constituency in the United Kingdom, 1885 onwards

Coordinates: 53.355°N 1.523°W

- County constituency for the House of Commons
- Boundaries since 2024
- Boundary of Sheffield Hallam in Yorkshire and the Humber
- County: South Yorkshire
- Population: 84,912
- Electorate: 69,323 (December 2019)

Current constituency
- Created: 1885
- Member of Parliament: Olivia Blake (Labour)
- Seats: One
- Created from: Sheffield

Sheffield Hallam is a constituency (Note: A county constituency (for the purposes of election expenses and type of returning officer)) represented in the House of Commons of the UK Parliament since 2019 by Olivia Blake of the Labour Party. (Note: As with all constituencies, the constituency elects one Member of Parliament (MP) by the first past the post system of election at least every five years.)

== Constituency profile ==
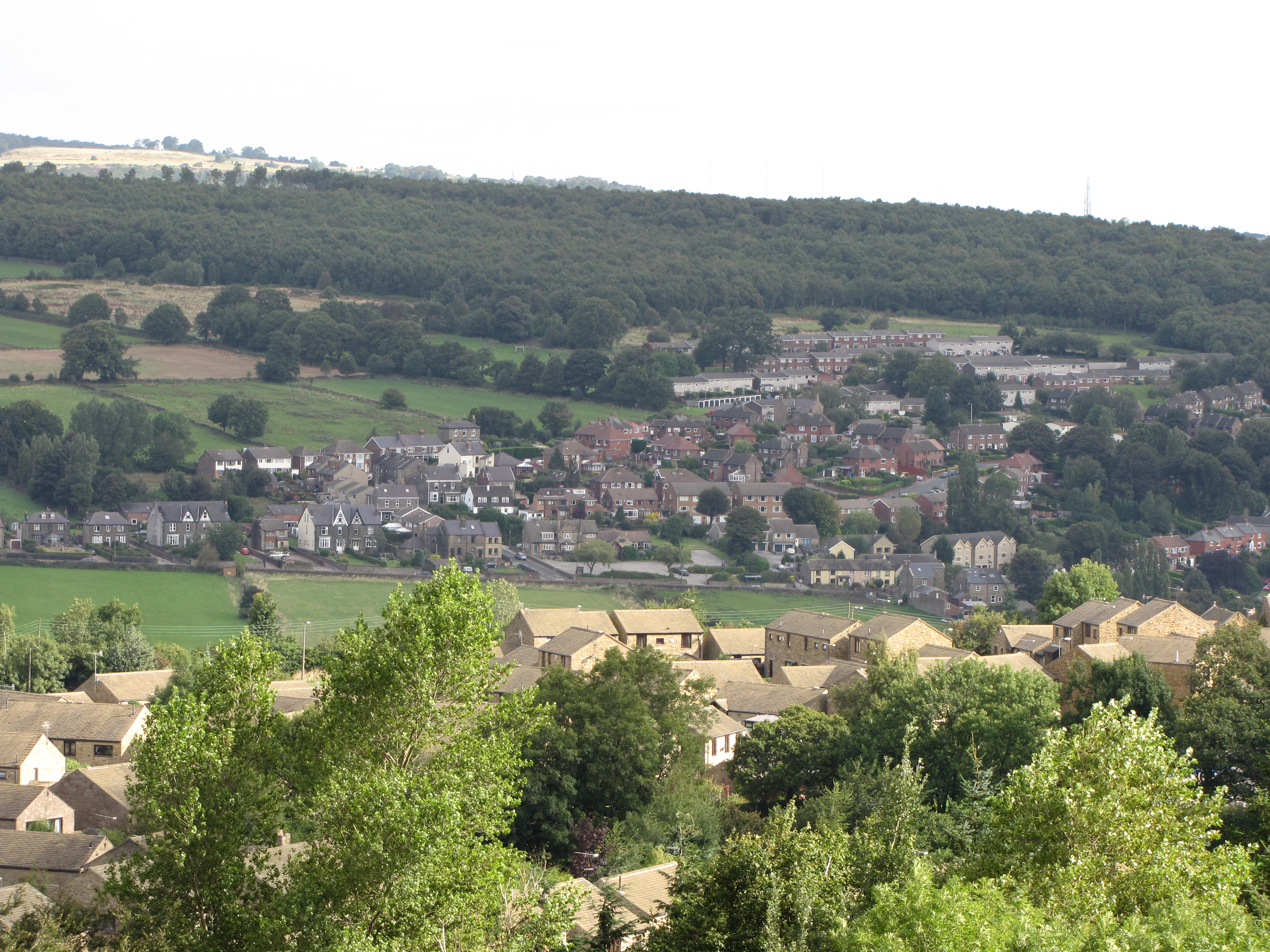
Stannington (foreground) and Loxley (background)

Sheffield Hallam is a constituency in South Yorkshire in England. It covers the western suburbs of the city of Sheffield, including Middlewood, Loxley, Stannington, Crookes, Crosspool, Ranmoor, Fulwood, Ecclesall, Whirlow, Dore and Totley. The constituency is named after Hallamshire, the historic name for the area of Yorkshire that today includes Sheffield.

Sheffield is traditionally an industrial city that grew rapidly during the late 18th and early 19th centuries, with steelmaking and coal mining being the predominant industries. Much of the city was redeveloped after World War II; the city's steel industry made it a target for the Luftwaffe in the Sheffield Blitz. Sheffield Hallam is one of the country's most affluent constituencies with very low levels of deprivation. Suburbs like Ranmoor, Whirlow and Dore contain many large detached and semi-detached properties, many of which were built for the city's wealthy industrialists. These neighbourhoods lie in the foothills of the Peak District and the constituency stretches past the suburbs to include an area of rural hamlets, farms and moorland. House prices across the constituency are generally higher than the UK average and considerably higher than the rest of Yorkshire.

Residents of Sheffield Hallam are older than average; there is a large student population due to the constituency's proximity to Sheffield's universities, however there is a low working-age adult population and a high proportion of retirees. Residents have very high levels of income and homeownership and the child poverty rate is less than half the overall UK figure. Residents are very well-educated and a high proportion work in the education, health and finance sectors. The percentage claiming unemployment benefits is less than half the UK-wide rate. White people made up 88% of the population at the 2021 census.

Most of Sheffield Hallam is represented by Liberal Democrats at the local city council, with some Labour Party councillors elected in Crookes and Crosspool and Green Party councillors elected in Ecclesall. Voters in this constituency strongly supported remaining in the European Union in the 2016 referendum; an estimated 69% voted to remain compared to the UK-wide figure of 48%.

== History ==
Prior to its creation Hallam was a part of the larger Sheffield Borough constituency, which was represented by two Members of Parliament (MPs). In 1885 the Redistribution of Seats Act, which sought to eliminate constituencies with more than one MP and for the first time allow approximately equal representation of the people, led to the break-up of the constituency into five divisions: each represented by a single MP, as today. Hallam was one of these new divisions. Its first MP, the Conservative Charles Stuart-Wortley, had previously been an MP in the Sheffield constituency, elected for the first time in 1880.

Hallam was regarded in 2004 as the wealthiest constituency in the north of England and was held by the Conservative Party for all but two years from 1885 to 1997. At the 1997 general election, Richard Allan of the Liberal Democrats took the seat with an 18.5% swing, becoming only the second non-Tory ever to win it. He handed the seat to fellow Lib Dem and future UK Deputy Prime Minister, Nick Clegg in 2005; who held it until his defeat by Labour's Jared O'Mara at the 2017 snap general election. That year saw the constituency record its highest turnout in 66 years, with 77.8% of the electorate going to the polls.

Sheffield Hallam was once only constituency in South Yorkshire not to be considered a Labour stronghold, returning its first Labour MP in 2017. It was a safe Conservative seat from 1885 until 1997. This long period of Conservative dominance included the period under Margaret Thatcher's premiership, starkly contrasting with most seats in the county and the neighbouring county of Derbyshire; the constituency was the only Conservative seat in South Yorkshire in the three elections before the 1997 General Election.

At the 1997 general election, Richard Allan of the Liberal Democrats took the seat with an 18.5% swing. He was followed by Nick Clegg in 2005, who was leader of the Liberal Democrats from 2007 to 2015 and Deputy Prime Minister from 2010 to 2015. Clegg held it until his defeat by Labour's Jared O'Mara at the 2017 snap general election. That year saw the constituency record its highest turnout in 66 years, with 77.8% of the electorate going to the polls.

From 25 October 2017 until 3 July 2018, O'Mara had the whip withdrawn as a Labour MP and sat as an independent. It was later restored but he quit the Labour Party shortly afterwards. He then sat as an independent MP until leaving parliament. O'Mara announced he would resign as an MP in September 2019, citing mental health issues. He postponed his resignation until the 2019 general election.

Olivia Blake won the seat for the Labour Party in the 2019 general election with a small majority of 1.2%. In her maiden speech to Parliament, Blake said that the Sheffield Hallam constituency had a "very long history of social justice", as mythology points to a Yorkshire origin for Robin Hood in Loxley, thereby lending her support to the idea that Loxley was the birthplace of Robin Hood.

Blake retained her seat at the 2024 general election with a much increased majority of 15.9%, and 23,875 votes in total.

== Boundaries ==
1885–1918: The Borough of Sheffield wards of: Nether and Upper Hallam, and parts of the wards of Ecclesall and St George's.

1918–1950: The County Borough of Sheffield wards of: Crookesmoor and Hallam, and part of Broomhill ward.

1950–1955: The County Borough of Sheffield wards of: Broomhill, Ecclesall, and Hallam.

1955–1974: The County Borough of Sheffield wards of: Broomhill, Crookesmoor, Ecclesall, and Hallam.

1974–1983: The County Borough of Sheffield wards of: Broomhill, Dore, Ecclesall, Hallam, and Nether Edge.

1983–1997: The City of Sheffield wards of: Broomhill, Dore, Ecclesall, Hallam, and Nether Edge.

1997–2010: The City of Sheffield wards of: Broomhill, Dore, Ecclesall, and Hallam.

2010–2024: The City of Sheffield wards of: Crookes; Dore and Totley; Ecclesall; Fulwood; and Stannington (as they existed on 12 April 2005).

2024–present: The City of Sheffield wards of: Crookes & Crosspool, Dore & Totley, Ecclesall, Fulwood, and Stannington (as they existed in 1 December 2020).

Minor changes to align with new ward boundaries.

Hallam (Note: The constituency should not be confused with the former Hallamshire constituency.) borders Derbyshire Dales, High Peak, North East Derbyshire, Penistone and Stocksbridge, Sheffield Brightside and Hillsborough, Sheffield Central and Sheffield Heeley.

== Members of Parliament ==
Election	Member	Party
1885	Charles Stuart-Wortley	Conservative
1916 (by)	H. A. L. Fisher	Liberal
1918	Douglas Vickers	Conservative
1922	Frederick Sykes (Note: Knighted in 1928 and appointed Governor of Bombay)	Conservative
1928 (by)	Louis Smith	Conservative
1939 (by)	Roland Jennings	Conservative
1959	John Osborn	Conservative
1987	Irvine Patnick	Conservative
1997	Richard Allan	Liberal Democrats
2005	Nick Clegg	Liberal Democrats
2017	Jared O'Mara	Labour
Oct 2017	Jared O'Mara	Independent
3 Jul 2018	Jared O'Mara	Labour
12 Jul 2018	Jared O'Mara	Independent
2019	Olivia Blake	Labour

== Elections ==
Election results for Sheffield Hallam

=== Elections in the 2020s ===
General election 2024: Sheffield Hallam
Party	Candidate	Votes	%	±%
Labour	Olivia Blake	23,875	46.3	+11.3
Liberal Democrats	Shaffaq Mohammed	15,686	30.4	−2.7
Conservative	Isaac Howarth	6,205	12.0	−13.7
Green	Jason Leman	4,491	8.7	+5.7
SDP	Andrew Cowell	654	1.3	N/A
Rejoin EU	Sam Chapman	409	0.8	N/A
Workers Party	Mo Moui-Tabrizy	281	0.5	N/A
Majority		8,189	15.9	+14.7
Turnout		51,601	70.7	−7.7
Registered electors		73,033		
Labour hold		Swing	+7.0	

=== Elections in the 2010s ===
2019 notional result
Party	Vote	%
Labour	21,004	35.0
Liberal Democrats	19,896	33.1
Conservative	15,435	25.7
Green	1,799	3.0
Brexit Party	1,641	2.7
Others	291	0.5
Turnout	60,066	78.4
Electorate	76,637	

General election 2019: Sheffield Hallam
Party	Candidate	Votes	%	±%
Labour	Olivia Blake	19,709	34.6	−3.8
Liberal Democrats	Laura Gordon	18,997	33.4	−1.3
Conservative	Ian Walker	14,696	25.8	+2.0
Green	Natalie Thomas	1,630	2.9	+1.5
Brexit Party	Terence McHale	1,562	2.7	N/A
UKIP	Michael Virgo	168	0.3	−1.3
Independent	Liz Aspden	123	0.2	N/A
Majority		712	1.2	−2.5
Turnout		56,885	78.2	+0.4
Labour hold		Swing	-1.2	

General election 2017: Sheffield Hallam
Party	Candidate	Votes	%	±%
Labour	Jared O'Mara	21,881	38.4	+2.6
Liberal Democrats	Nick Clegg	19,756	34.7	−5.3
Conservative	Ian Walker	13,561	23.8	+10.2
UKIP	John Thurley	929	1.6	−4.8
Green	Logan Robin	823	1.4	−1.8
SDP	Steven Winstone	70	0.1	N/A
Majority		2,125	3.7	N/A
Turnout		57,020	77.8	+2.5
Labour gain from Liberal Democrats		Swing	+4.0	

General election 2015: Sheffield Hallam
Party	Candidate	Votes	%	±%
Liberal Democrats	Nick Clegg	22,215	40.0	−13.4
Labour	Oliver Coppard	19,862	35.8	+19.7
Conservative	Ian Walker	7,544	13.6	−9.9
UKIP	Joe Jenkins	3,575	6.4	+4.1
Green	Peter Garbutt	1,772	3.2	+1.4
Independent	Carlton Reeve	249	0.4	N/A
English Democrat	Steve Clegg	167	0.3	−0.8
Independent	Jim Stop the Fiasco Wild	97	0.2	N/A
Majority		2,353	4.2	−25.7
Turnout		55,481	75.3	+1.6
Liberal Democrats hold		Swing	-16.5	

General election 2010: Sheffield Hallam
Party	Candidate	Votes	%	±%
Liberal Democrats	Nick Clegg	27,324	53.4	+2.2
Conservative	Nicola Bates	12,040	23.5	−6.2
Labour	Jack Scott	8,228	16.1	+3.5
UKIP	Nigel James	1,195	2.3	+1.2
Green	Steve Barnard	919	1.8	−1.5
English Democrat	David Wildgoose	586	1.1	N/A
Independent	Martin Fitzpatrick	429	0.8	N/A
Christian	Ray Green	250	0.5	N/A
Monster Raving Loony	Mark Adshead	164	0.3	N/A
Majority		15,284	29.9	+8.5
Turnout		51,135	73.7	+11.5
Liberal Democrats hold		Swing	+4.2	

In 2010, Sheffield Hallam was one of a number of constituencies that experienced problems on polling day leading to some people being unable to cast their vote. In this case, voters at the Ranmoor polling station were subjected to long queues and some voters were turned away when polls closed at 10 pm, with Liberal Democrat candidate Nick Clegg apologising to those voters affected. Acting Returning Officer John Mothersole said that staff had been "caught out" by a high turnout, and the Electoral Commission instigated a review of procedures in Hallam and other constituencies where similar problems had occurred.

=== Elections in the 2000s ===
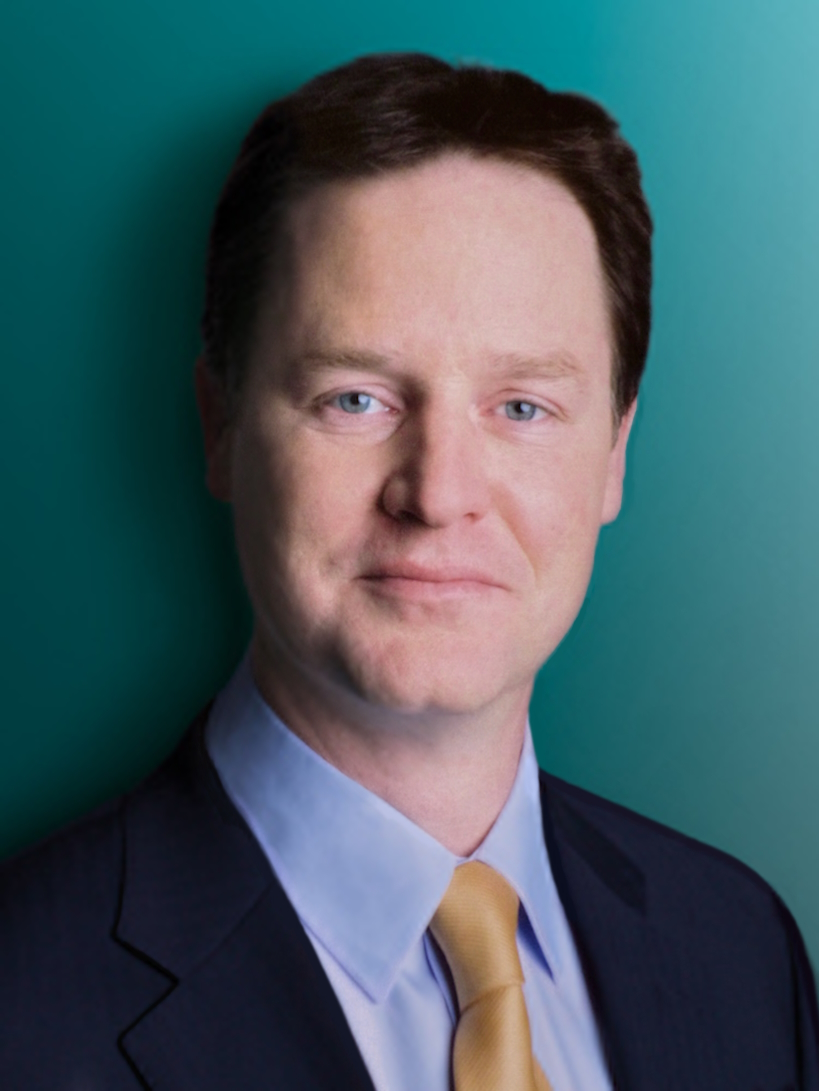
Nick Clegg

General election 2005: Sheffield Hallam
Party	Candidate	Votes	%	±%
Liberal Democrats	Nick Clegg	20,710	51.2	−4.2
Conservative	Spencer Pitfield	12,028	29.7	−1.3
Labour	Mahroof Hussain	5,110	12.6	+0.2
Green	Rob Cole	1,331	3.3	N/A
CPA	Sidney Cordle	441	1.1	N/A
UKIP	Nigel James	438	1.1	±0.0
BNP	Ian Senior	369	0.9	N/A
Majority		8,682	21.5	−2.9
Turnout		40,527	62.2	−2.6
Liberal Democrats hold		Swing	-2.9	

General election 2001: Sheffield Hallam
Party	Candidate	Votes	%	±%
Liberal Democrats	Richard Allan	21,203	55.4	+4.1
Conservative	John Harthman	11,856	31.0	−2.1
Labour	Gill Furniss	4,758	12.4	−1.1
UKIP	Leslie Arnott	429	1.1	N/A
Majority		9,347	24.4	+6.2
Turnout		38,246	64.8	−7.6
Liberal Democrats hold		Swing	+3.1	

=== Elections in the 1990s ===
General election 1997: (Note: At the 1997 general election the seat saw an unprecedented 18.2% one-party swing from the other parties, particularly the large Conservative vote, towards the Liberal Democrat winning candidate.) Sheffield Hallam
Party	Candidate	Votes	%	±%
Liberal Democrats	Richard Allan	23,345	51.3	+18.2
Conservative	Irvine Patnick	15,074	33.1	−12.4
Labour	Stephen G. Conquest	6,147	13.5	−6.6
Referendum	Ian S. Davidson	788	1.7	N/A
Independent	Philip Booler	125	0.3	N/A
Majority		8,271	18.2	N/A
Turnout		45,479	72.4	+1.6
Liberal Democrats gain from Conservative		Swing	+15.3	

General election 1992: Sheffield Hallam
Party	Candidate	Votes	%	±%
Conservative	Irvine Patnick	24,693	45.5	−0.8
Liberal Democrats	Peter J. Gold	17,952	33.1	+0.6
Labour	Veronica Hardstaff	10,930	20.1	−0.3
Green	Mallen Baker	473	0.9	+0.1
Natural Law	Richard E. Hurtford	101	0.2	N/A
Revolutionary Communist	Theresa M. Clifford	99	0.2	N/A
Majority		6,741	12.4	−1.4
Turnout		54,248	70.8	−3.9
Conservative hold		Swing	-0.7	

=== Elections in the 1980s ===
General election 1987: Sheffield Hallam
Party	Candidate	Votes	%	±%
Conservative	Irvine Patnick (Note: After 28 years as MP for the seat, John Osborn stood down at the 1987 general election. His replacement as the Conservative Party candidate, local businessman Irvine Patnick, held the seat for the Conservatives with a slightly reduced majority.)	25,649	46.3	−4.3
Liberal	Peter Gold	18,012	32.5	+4.1
Labour	Mukesh Savani	11,290	20.4	+0.7
Green	Leela Spencer	459	0.8	N/A
Majority		7,637	13.8	−2.4
Turnout		55,410	74.7	+1.9
Conservative hold		Swing	-4.2	

General election 1983: Sheffield Hallam
Party	Candidate	Votes	%	±%
Conservative	John Osborn	26,851	50.6	−4.3
Liberal	Malcolm S. Johnson	15,077	28.4	+12.7
Labour	Jean McCrindle	10,463	19.7	−9.1
Ind. Conservative	Philip Booler	656	1.2	N/A
Majority		11,774	22.2	−3.9
Turnout		53,047	72.8	+0.3
Conservative hold		Swing	-8.5	

=== Elections in the 1970s ===
General election 1979: Sheffield Hallam
Party	Candidate	Votes	%	±%
Conservative	John Osborn	31,436	54.9	+5.9
Labour	Mike Bower	16,502	28.8	−0.2
Liberal	Kenneth Salt	8,982	15.7	−6.3
National Front	G. F. Smith	300	0.5	N/A
Majority		14,934	26.1	+6.1
Turnout		57,220	72.5	+2.7
Conservative hold		Swing	+3.0	

General election October 1974: Sheffield Hallam
Party	Candidate	Votes	%	±%
Conservative	John Osborn	26,083	49.0	+0.1
Labour	Clive Betts (Note: David Blunkett, the losing February 1974 Labour candidate, won the Sheffield Brightside seat in 1987 enabling his later positions in government as Secretary of State (1997–2005).)	15,419	29.0	+1.8
Liberal	Malcolm Johnson	11,724	22.0	−1.9
Majority		10,664	20.0	−1.7
Turnout		53226	68.8	−8.4
Conservative hold		Swing	-0.8	

General election February 1974: Sheffield Hallam
Party	Candidate	Votes	%	±%
Conservative	John Osborn	29,062	48.9	−12.4
Labour	David Blunkett	16,149	27.2	−4.2
Liberal	Malcolm Johnson	14,160	23.9	+16.6
Majority		12,913	21.7	−8.2'"`UNIQ−−ref−000000CD−QINU`"'
Turnout		59,371	77.2	+7.4
Conservative hold		Swing	-4.1	

General election 1970: Sheffield Hallam
Party	Candidate	Votes	%	±%
Conservative	John Osborn	25,134	61.3	+10.0
Labour	Alan Broadley	12,884	31.4	−1.1
Liberal	Preetam Singh	2,972	7.3	−8.9
Majority		12,250	29.9	+11.1
Turnout		40,990	69.8	−5.2
Conservative hold		Swing	+5.5	

=== Elections in the 1960s ===
General election 1966: Sheffield Hallam
Party	Candidate	Votes	%	±%
Conservative	John Osborn	21,593	51.3	−3.7
Labour	Peter Hardy	13,663	32.5	+5.5
Liberal	Denis Lloyd	6,799	16.2	−1.9
Majority		7,930	18.8	−9.2
Turnout		42,055	75.0	+0.9
Conservative hold		Swing	-4.6	

General election 1964: Sheffield Hallam
Party	Candidate	Votes	%	±%
Conservative	John Osborn	23,719	55.0	−7.8
Labour	Arthur Kingscott	11,635	27.0	+0.9
Liberal	George Manley	7,807	18.1	+6.9
Majority		12,084	28.0	−8.7
Turnout		43,161	74.1	−2.0
Conservative hold		Swing	-4.4	

=== Elections in the 1950s ===
General election 1959: Sheffield Hallam
Party	Candidate	Votes	%	±%
National Liberal	John Osborn	28,747	62.8	−3.4
Labour	Solomon Sachs	11,938	26.1	−7.7
Liberal	Bernard Roseby	5,119	11.2	N/A
Majority		16,809	36.7	+4.3
Turnout		45,804	76.1	+2.0
National Liberal hold		Swing	+2.15	

General election 1955: Sheffield Hallam
Party	Candidate	Votes	%	±%
National Liberal	Roland Jennings	30,069	66.2	−4.6
Labour	James Marsden	15,330	33.8	+4.6
Majority		14,739	32.4	−9.2
Turnout		45,399	74.1	−7.9
National Liberal hold		Swing	-4.6	

General election 1951: Sheffield Hallam
Party	Candidate	Votes	%	±%
National Liberal	Roland Jennings	29,016	70.8	+5.7
Labour	Frederick Beaton	11,988	29.2	+2.7
Majority		17,028	41.6	+3.0
Turnout		41,004	82.0	−4.4
National Liberal hold		Swing	+1.5	

General election 1950: Sheffield Hallam
Party	Candidate	Votes	%	±%
National Liberal	Roland Jennings	28,159	65.1	+18.0
Labour	H. C. Spears	11,444	26.5	−12.0
Liberal	Alfred Edwin Jones	3,641	8.4	+0.7
Majority		16,715	38.6	+30.0
Turnout		43,244	86.4	+10.7
National Liberal hold		Swing	+15.0	

=== Elections in the 1940s ===
General election 1945: Sheffield Hallam (Note: "Conservative and Liberal")
Party	Candidate	Votes	%	±%
National Liberal	Roland Jennings	15,874	47.1	−20.2
Labour	John Frederick Drabble	13,009	38.5	+5.8
Liberal	Gerald Abrahams	2,614	7.7	N/A
Communist	Gordon Cree	2,253	6.7	N/A
Majority		2,865	8.6	−26.0
Turnout		33,750	75.7	+4.0
National Liberal hold		Swing	-13.0	

=== Elections in the 1930s ===
1939 Sheffield Hallam by-election (Note: "Conservative and Liberal")
Party	Candidate	Votes	%	±%
National Liberal	Roland Jennings	16,033	61.7	−5.6
Labour	C. S. Darvill	9,939	38.3	+5.6
Majority		6,094	23.4	−11.2
Turnout		25,972	57.8	−13.9
National Liberal hold		Swing	+5.6	

General election 1935: Sheffield Hallam
Party	Candidate	Votes	%	±%
Conservative	Louis Smith	21,298	67.3	−10.2
Labour	Grace Colman	10,346	32.7	+10.2
Majority		10,952	34.6	−20.4
Turnout		31,644	71.7	−8.6
Conservative hold		Swing	+10.2	

General election 1931: Sheffield Hallam
Party	Candidate	Votes	%	±%
Conservative	Louis Smith	26,857	77.5	+16.6
Labour	Henry McGhee	7,807	22.5	−16.6
Majority		19,050	55.0	+23.2
Turnout		34,664	80.3	+7.1
Conservative hold		Swing	+16.6	

=== Elections in the 1920s ===
General election 1929: Sheffield Hallam
Party	Candidate	Votes	%	±%
Unionist	Louis Smith	18,920	60.9	−2.8
Labour	Basil Rawson	12,133	39.1	+2.8
Majority		6,787	21.8	−5.6
Turnout		31,053	73.2	−4.6
Unionist hold		Swing	-2.8	

1928 Sheffield Hallam by-election (Note: The 1928 by-election followed the resignation of Frederick Sykes on 26 June to take up an appointment as Governor of Bombay.)
Party	Candidate	Votes	%	±%
Unionist	Louis Smith	9,417	53.7	−10.0
Labour	Charles Flynn	5,393	30.8	−5.5
Liberal	Joseph Burton Hobman	2,715	15.5	N/A
Majority		4,024	22.9	−4.5
Turnout		17,525	54.7	−23.1
Unionist hold		Swing	−2.25	

General election 1924: Sheffield Hallam
Party	Candidate	Votes	%	±%
Unionist	Frederick Sykes	15,446	63.7	+6.0
Labour	Edward Snelgrove	8,807	36.3	+12.4
Majority		6,639	27.4	−1.4
Turnout		24,253	77.8	+2.8
Unionist hold		Swing	−3.2	

General election 1923: Sheffield Hallam
Party	Candidate	Votes	%	±%
Unionist	Frederick Sykes	12,119	57.7	−1.7
Labour	Arnold Freeman	5,506	23.9	N/A
Liberal	Cuthbert Snowball Rewcastle	5,383	23.4	−17.2
Majority		6,613	28.8	+10.0
Turnout		23,008	75.0	+1.3
Unionist hold				

General election 1922: Sheffield Hallam
Party	Candidate	Votes	%	±%
Unionist	Frederick Sykes	13,405	59.4	N/A
Liberal	Cuthbert Snowball Rewcastle	9,173	40.6	N/A
Majority		4,232	18.8	N/A
Turnout		22,578	73.7	N/A
Unionist hold				

=== Elections in the 1910s ===
General election 1918: Sheffield Hallam
Party		Candidate	Votes	%	±%
C	Unionist	Douglas Vickers	Unopposed		
	Unionist hold				
C indicates candidate endorsed by the coalition government.

1916 Sheffield Hallam by-election
Party	Candidate	Votes	%	±%
Liberal	H. A. L. Fisher	Unopposed		
Liberal gain from Unionist				

- 1916 by-election followed the resignation of Charles Stuart-Wortley on 16 December. Herbert Fisher of the Liberal Party was elected unopposed, becoming Hallam's first non-Unionist MP.

Arthur Neal

General election December 1910: Sheffield Hallam
Party	Candidate	Votes	%	±%
Conservative	Charles Stuart-Wortley	5,788	50.9	±0.0
Liberal	Arthur Neal	5,593	49.1	±0.0
Majority		195	1.8	±0.0
Turnout		11,381	84.1	−5.7
Registered electors		13,527		
Conservative hold		Swing	±0.0	

General election January 1910: Sheffield Hallam
Party	Candidate	Votes	%	±%
Conservative	Charles Stuart-Wortley	6,181	50.9	+0.5
Liberal	Arthur Neal	5,965	49.1	−0.5
Majority		216	1.8	+1.0
Turnout		12,146	89.8	+4.8
Registered electors		13,527		
Conservative hold		Swing	+0.5	

=== Elections in the 1900s ===
1906 general election: Sheffield Hallam
Party	Candidate	Votes	%	±%
Conservative	Charles Stuart-Wortley	5,546	50.4	N/A
Liberal	A. Grant	5,465	49.6	N/A
Majority		81	0.8	N/A
Turnout		11,011	85.0	N/A
Registered electors		12,956		
Conservative hold				

1900 general election: Sheffield Hallam
Party	Candidate	Votes	%	±%
Conservative	Charles Stuart-Wortley	Unopposed		
Conservative hold				

=== Elections in the 1890s ===
1895 general election: Sheffield Hallam
Party	Candidate	Votes	%	±%
Conservative	Charles Stuart-Wortley	Unopposed		
Conservative hold				

1892 general election: Sheffield Hallam
Party	Candidate	Votes	%	±%
Conservative	Charles Stuart-Wortley	4,057	54.3	−3.5
Liberal	Robert Hammond	3,414	45.7	+3.5
Majority		643	8.6	−7.0
Turnout		7,471	87.3	+8.4
Registered electors		8,561		
Conservative hold		Swing	−3.5	

=== Elections in the 1880s ===
1886 general election: Sheffield Hallam
Party	Candidate	Votes	%	±%
Conservative	Charles Stuart-Wortley	3,581	57.8	+3.4
Lib-Lab	T. R. Threlfall	2,612	42.2	−3.4
Majority		969	15.6	+6.8
Turnout		6,193	78.9	−9.3
Registered electors		7,846		
Conservative hold		Swing	+3.4	

1885 general election: Sheffield Hallam
Party	Candidate	Votes	%	±%
Conservative	Charles Stuart-Wortley	3,764	54.4	
Liberal	Charles Warren	3,155	45.6	
Majority		609	8.8	
Turnout		6,919	88.2	
Registered electors		7,846		
Conservative win (new seat)				

== Constituency polls during the 2010–2015 Parliament ==
Due in part to the high profile of the constituency's then-MP Nick Clegg, who served as Deputy Prime Minister during the 2010–15 Parliament, Sheffield Hallam was unusual in having had seven constituency-specific opinion polls conducted between 2010 and 2015. Each of these polls suggested significant changes in the vote share compared to 2010 general election.

The first poll, in October 2010, suggested a drop in the Lib Dem lead in the seat to just 2%, from nearly 30% at the general election five months earlier. Five of the six remaining polls, which appeared between May 2014 and May 2015, suggested that Labour was in the lead in the seat by this time, with the Labour lead fluctuating to between 1% and 10%, and one put the Lib Dems in the lead.

On average across all seven opinion polls, Labour had a lead over the Lib Dems of 2.5%. The Conservatives came second in one poll, and third in the other six polls. The May 2015 ICM poll scores displayed are those of the constituency voting intention question. The same poll also carried the standard voting intention question, which showed a Labour lead.

Dates	Polling organisation/client	Sample size	Lab	Con	LD	UKIP	Green	Others	Lead
8 June 2017	General Election 2017	57,020	38.4%	23.8%	34.7%	1.6%	1.4%	0.1%	3.8% over LD
7 May 2015	General Election 2015	55,481	35.8%	13.6%	40.0%	6.4%	3.2%	0.9%	4.2% over Lab
1–3 May 2015	ICM/Guardian	501	35%	12%	42%	7%	3%	2%	7% over Lab
22–28 Apr 2015	Lord Ashcroft	1,000	37%	15%	36%	7%	4%	1%	1% over LD
22–28 Mar 2015	Lord Ashcroft	1,001	36%	16%	34%	7%	6%	1%	2% over LD
22–29 Jan 2015	Survation/Unite	1,011	33%	22%	23%	9%	12%	<0.5%	10% over LD
20–22 Nov 2014	Survation/Lord Ashcroft	962	30%	19%	27%	13%	10%	1%	3% over LD
29 Apr–4 May 2014	ICM/Lord Oakeshott	500	33%	24%	23%	10%	8%	1%	9% over Con
1–4 Oct 2010	Populus/Lord Ashcroft	1,000	31%	28%	33%	N/A	N/A	8%	2% over Lab
6 May 2010	General Election Result	51,135	16.1%	23.5%	53.4%	2.3%	1.8%	2.7%	29.9% over Con

== See also ==
- Parliamentary constituencies in South Yorkshire
