= John Osborn (politician) =

British politician (1922–2015)

Sir John Osborn

Member of Parliament for Sheffield Hallam
- In office 8 October 1959 – 18 May 1987
- Preceded by: Roland Jennings
- Succeeded by: Irvine Patnick

Personal details
- Born: John Holbrook Osborn; 14 December 1922
- Died: 2 December 2015 (aged 92)
- Party: Conservative
- Education: Rugby School
- Alma mater: Trinity Hall, Cambridge

Sir John Holbrook Osborn (14 December 1922 – 2 December 2015) was a British Conservative politician.

Osborn was educated at Rugby School and Trinity Hall, Cambridge. He was member of parliament for Sheffield Hallam from 1959 to 1987, preceding Irvine Patnick. Sir John was also a Member of the European Parliament from 1975 to 1979. He was knighted in the 1983 Birthday Honours.

Osborn was interviewed in 2012 as part of The History of Parliament's oral history project.

Parliament of the United Kingdom
Preceded by Sir Roland Jennings	Member of Parliament for Sheffield Hallam; 1959–1987	Succeeded by Irvine Patnick
