= Cuthbert Snowball Rewcastle =

British judge and Liberal Party politician

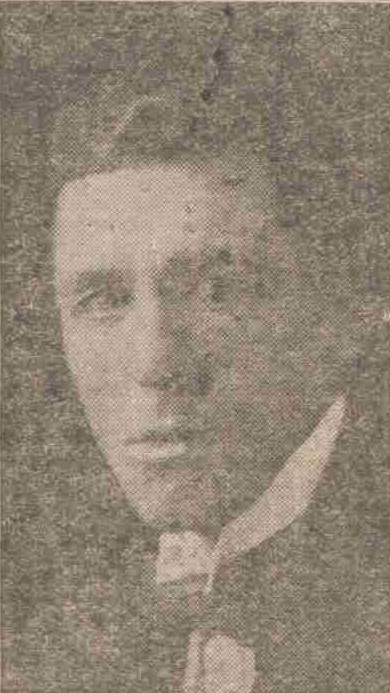

Cuthbert Snowball Rewcastle (21 February 1888 – 8 June 1962), was a British judge and Liberal Party politician.

== Background ==
He was born the son of Cuthbert Rewcastle JP. He was educated at Rugby School and Trinity College, Cambridge. In 1918 he married Annie Evelyn Goddard who died in 1923. In 1926 he married Dr Attracta Genevieve Candon, who went on to become the first female commissioned officer in the Royal Navy. They had two sons and one daughter.

In 1951, two months after his wife's death, Rewcastle's son, Sub Lieutenant Anthony Giles Candon Rewcastle was lost with the submarine HMS Affray. His daughter, Rosalind Maskell, was a prominent microbiologist.

== Professional career ==
In 1952 he was appointed a Judge of County Courts for Kingston-upon-Thames and Wandsworth.

== Political career ==
He was Liberal candidate for the Hallam division of Sheffield at the 1922 and 1923 General Elections. Hallam was a traditional Unionist seat that nearly went Liberal in 1906. It remained a marginal in both 1910 General Elections before being the vehicle that propelled Liberal H. A. L. Fisher into parliament as a supporter of the Lloyd George coalition. In 1918 Fisher chose not to defend this seat and a coalition supporting Unionist was returned unopposed. By the 1922 election, the Coalition Government had ended and in Hallam, the party political battle between Unionist and Liberal was resumed after 12 years. However, Rewcastle was only able to capture around 40% of the vote. In 1923 another general election was fought, primarily on the issue of free trade v tariffs. Rewcastle might have fancied his prospects of winning, however a Labour Party candidate intervened and split the anti-tariff vote, pushing Rewcastle into third place. He did not contest the 1924 general election. He was Honorary Secretary of the Eighty Club, a Liberal Party gentlemen's club in London, named after the year it was founded (1880). He was Liberal candidate again, but this time for the Kettering division of Northamptonshire at the 1929 General Election. Kettering was a Unionist/Labour marginal seat that the Liberals last contested in 1923 when they came third. In 1929 he again came third, with a lower share than the 1923 Liberal had managed. He did not stand for parliament again. He served as Chairman of the Commission on Silicosis Legislation, Northern Rhodesia in 1949. He served as Chairman of the Commission on Pulmonary Disability in 1954.

=== Electoral record ===
General Election 1922: Sheffield Hallam
Party	Candidate	Votes	%	±%
Unionist	Frederick Sykes	13,405	59.4	n/a
Liberal	Cuthbert Snowball Rewcastle	9,173	40.6	n/a
Majority		4,232	18.8	n/a
Turnout			73.7	n/a
Unionist hold		Swing	n/a	

General Election 1923: Sheffield Hallam
Party	Candidate	Votes	%	±%
Unionist	Frederick Sykes	12,119	57.7	−1.7
Labour	Arnold Freeman	5,506	23.9	n/a
Liberal	Cuthbert Snowball Rewcastle	5,383	23.4	−17.2
Majority		6,613	28.8	+10.0
Turnout			75.0	+1.3
Unionist hold		Swing	n/a	

General Election 1929: Kettering
Party	Candidate	Votes	%	±%
Labour Co-op	Samuel Perry	18,253	43.8	−5.8
Unionist	Mervyn Manningham-Buller	15,469	37.1	−13.3
Liberal	Cuthbert Snowball Rewcastle	7,972	19.1	n/a
Majority		2,784	6.7	
Turnout		41,694	85.8	4.2
Labour Co-op gain from Unionist		Swing		
