= 1928 Sheffield Hallam by-election =

UK Parliamentary by-election

The 1928 Sheffield Hallam by-election was held on 16 July 1928. The by-election was held due to the appointment of the incumbent Conservative MP, Frederick Sykes, as Governor of Bombay. It was won by the Conservative candidate Louis Smith. At the previous two general elections (1923 and 1924) the Conservative candidate had won the seat with majorities of over 6,000 votes.

== Result ==
Sheffield Hallam by-election, 1928
Party	Candidate	Votes	%	±%
Conservative	Louis Smith	9,417	53.7	−10.0
Labour	Charles Flynn	5,393	30.8	−5.5
Liberal	Joseph Burton Hobman	2,715	15.5	N/A
Majority		4,024	22.9	−4.5
Turnout		17,525	54.7	−23.1
Conservative hold		Swing	-2.25	

After winning the by-election, Smith successfully defended the seat at the following year's general election. On that occasion he won with an increased majority of 6,787 votes in a straight fight with a Labour candidate. At the same contest, Hobman fought Bradford North for the Liberals, but again finished in third place.
