= Rosalind Maskell =

English microbiologist (1928–2016)

Rosalind Mary Maskell (née Rewcastle; 12 June 1928 – 7 September 2016) FRCP was an English microbiologist known for her work on urinary tract infections.

== Biography ==
Maskell was born in London in 1928 to Cuthbert Snowball Rewcastle, a judge, and Attracta Rewcastle, a doctor and the first female commissioned officer in the Royal Navy. She attended Tunbridge Wells Girls' Grammar School and Millfield before studying medicine at Somerville College, Oxford, graduating with a BA in physiology in 1950. She completed her clinical training at St Bartholomew's Hospital in London and qualified as MB ChB in 1953. After marrying John Maskell, a general practitioner, in 1954, she left medical practice for 14 years in order to raise a family.

Maskell returned to medical practice in 1968, as a clinical assistant in the renal unit and public health laboratory at St Mary's Hospital in Portsmouth. There, she developed an interest in urinary tract infections, which became the focus of her career. She investigated women who experienced urinary symptoms but whose tests did not show bacteriuria and were therefore diagnosed with urethral syndrome or interstitial cystitis. She showed that these patients' urine cultures often grew bacteria that were usually dismissed as natural flora, and hypothesised that repeated antibiotic exposure caused these "normal" urethral bacteria to develop resistance. She set up a clinic for urinary tract infections, where she promoted research and discouraged the use of antibiotics and unnecessary investigations.

Maskell published two books: Urinary tract infection (1982) and Urinary tract infection in clinical and laboratory practice (1988). Her honours included a Doctor of Medicine awarded by the University of Oxford in 1985 and election as Fellow of the Royal College of Physicians in 1992. She retired in 1993, although she continued to publish academic papers until 2010, and died on 7 September 2016.
