= 1916 Sheffield Hallam by-election =

British by-election

The 1916 Sheffield Hallam by-election was a parliamentary by-election held for the British House of Commons constituency of Sheffield Hallam in the West Riding of Yorkshire on 23 December 1916.

== Vacancy ==
The by-election was caused by the elevation to the peerage of the sitting Unionist MP, Charles Wortley. Wortley's ascent to the House of Lords was to enable a seat in the Commons to be found for H. A. L. Fisher. Fisher was a historian and noted expert on education. From 1913-1917 he served as Vice Chancellor of the University of Sheffield. The Prime Minister David Lloyd George wanted Fisher to serve in his cabinet as President of the Board of Education.

== Candidates ==
Lloyd George's government was a Coalition with the Conservatives and despite Fisher being a Liberal, Lloyd George's Unionist allies were willing to lend the Sheffield Hallam seat to him for the sake of the formation of the government and because of his close connection with the city of Sheffield.

== Result ==
There being no other candidates putting themselves forward Fisher was returned unopposed, a technical Liberal gain from the Conservatives.

Sheffield Hallam by-election, 1916
Party	Candidate	Votes	%	±%
Liberal	Herbert Fisher	Unopposed	N/A	N/A
Liberal gain from Conservative				

== See also ==
- List of United Kingdom by-elections
- United Kingdom by-election records
