= Joseph Burton Hobman =

Politician and Journalist

Joseph Burton Hobman (25 May 1872 – 30 September 1953) was a British Liberal Party politician and journalist.

== Background ==
He was born in Sheffield, the son of Joseph and Mary Hobman. He was educated at Wesley College (Sheffield). He married, first, Margaret H. Linacre, she died in 1924. He then married, Daisy Lucie Adler. They had one child.

== Newspaper career ==
He was Assistant Editor of the Sheffield Independent from 1898 to 1912, Editor of the Birmingham Gazette from 1912 to 1921. He was Editor of the Westminster Gazette from 1921 to 1928 and on the Editorial Staff, of the Westminster Press (Provincial) from 1928 to 1942. He was a contributor to the mid-European Press on foreign affairs. Perhaps influenced by his Jewish second wife, he was keenly sympathetic to the Zionist and other Jewish causes. He edited David Eder, a Memoir, 1945 and edited Palestine's Economic Future, 1946.

== Political career ==
He was an advocate of changing the electoral system and sat on the National Executive of the Proportional Representation Society. He was Liberal candidate for the 1928 Sheffield Hallam by-election. It was an unpromising seat for the Liberals who had not stood a candidate since coming third in 1923;

1928 Sheffield Hallam by-election Electorate
Party	Candidate	Votes	%	±%
Conservative	Louis Smith	9,417	53.7	
Labour	Charles Flynn	5,393	30.8	
Liberal	Joseph Burton Hobman	2,715	15.5	
Majority		4,024	22.9	
Turnout			54.7	
Conservative hold		Swing		

He was Liberal candidate for the Bradford North for the General Election 1929. This was a more promising seat that the Liberals had won in 1923, even though they had come third in 1924;

General Election 1929 Electorate 51,573
Party	Candidate	Votes	%	±%
Labour	Norman Angell	17,873	41.0	
Unionist	Eugene Ramsden	15,413	35.4	
Liberal	Joseph Burton Hobman	10,290	23.6	
Majority		2,460	5.5	
Turnout			84.5	
Labour gain from Unionist		Swing		

He was Liberal candidate for Bethnal Green North East, for the General Election 1935. This was a promising seat that had been won by the Liberals at the previous General Election. The sitting Liberal MP had joined the Labour party and sought re-election elsewhere. However, he was unable to hold the seat;

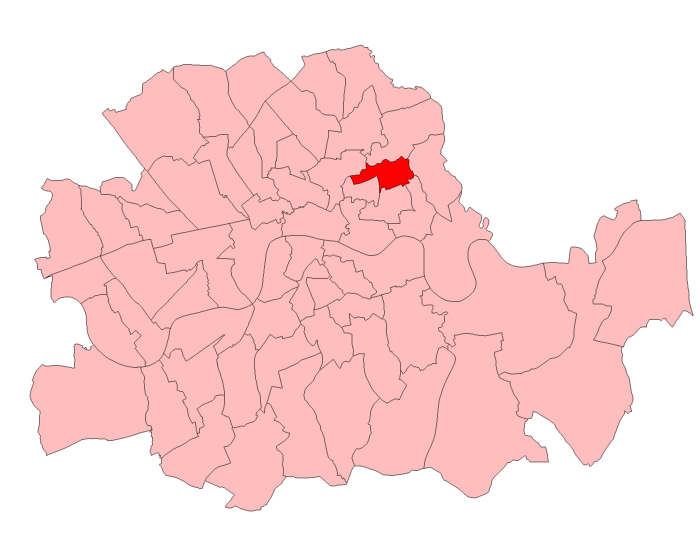
Bethnal Green North East in the County of London from 1918 to 1950.

General Election 1935: Bethnal Green North East Electorate
Party	Candidate	Votes	%	±%
Labour Co-op	Daniel Chater	11,581	63.5	
Liberal	Joseph Burton Hobman	6,644	36.5	
Majority		4,937	27.0	
Turnout		32,809	55.5	
Labour Co-op gain from Liberal		Swing	+19.4	

He did not stand for parliament again; however, in 1936, he was elected to serve on the Liberal Party Council.
