= Louis Smith (British politician) =

British politician (1879–1939)

Sir Louis William Smith (21 March 1879 – 15 March 1939) was a British Conservative Party politician.

After studying at Harrogate College, Smith became an engineer and a company director. He was elected as Member of Parliament (MP) for Sheffield Hallam at a by-election in July 1928, and held the seat until his death in 1939, aged 59.

Parliament of the United Kingdom
Preceded by Frederick Sykes	Member of Parliament for Sheffield Hallam; 1928–1939	Succeeded by Roland Jennings
