= Wykeham Professor =

Oxford University professorship

The University of Oxford has three statutory professorships named after William of Wykeham, who founded New College.

== Logic ==
The Wykeham Professorship in Logic was established in 1859, although it was not known as the Wykeham chair until later. Its first chair was Henry Wall.

=== List of holders of post ===
- Henry Wall, 1849?–1870
- Thomas Fowler, 1873–1889
- John Cook Wilson, 1889–1915
- Harold Henry Joachim, 1919–1935
- Henry Habberley Price, 1935–1959
- Alfred Jules Ayer, 1959–1978
- Michael Dummett, 1979–1992
- David Wiggins, 1993–2000
- Timothy Williamson, 2000–2023
- Richard Pettigrew, 2026–

== Ancient history ==
The Wykeham Professorship of Ancient History was established in 1910. It concentrates on Greek history to avoid possible duplication with the far older Camden Professorship of Ancient History, which focuses primarily on Roman history.

=== List of holders of post ===
- J. L. Myres, 1910–1939
- Theodore Wade-Gery, 1939–1953
- Antony Andrewes, 1953–1977
- W. G. (George) Forrest, 1977–1992
- Robert Parker, 1996–2016
- Nino Luraghi, 2018–present

== Physics ==
The Wykeham Professorship of Physics is the only endowed chair in the Rudolf Peierls Centre for Theoretical Physics at the University of Oxford. This professorship is associated with New College.

=== List of holders of post ===
- John Sealy Townsend, 1900–1941
- Maurice Pryce, 1946–1955
- Willis Lamb, 1957–1962
- Sir Rudolf Peierls, 1963–1974
- Sir Roger Elliott, 1974–1988
- David Sherrington, 1989–2008
- Shivaji Sondhi, 2021–present.

=== Tencent Chair of Theoretical Physics ===
In February 2021 The Times reported that the Wykeham Professorship of Physics was to be renamed "Tencent-Wykeham Professorship of Physics" following a donation, but the University later said the Wykeham Professorship of Physics will not be renamed; instead the current holder will also be given a separate post called "Tencent Chair of Theoretical Physics" to run concurrently with his Wykeham post.
