= George Forrest (historian) =

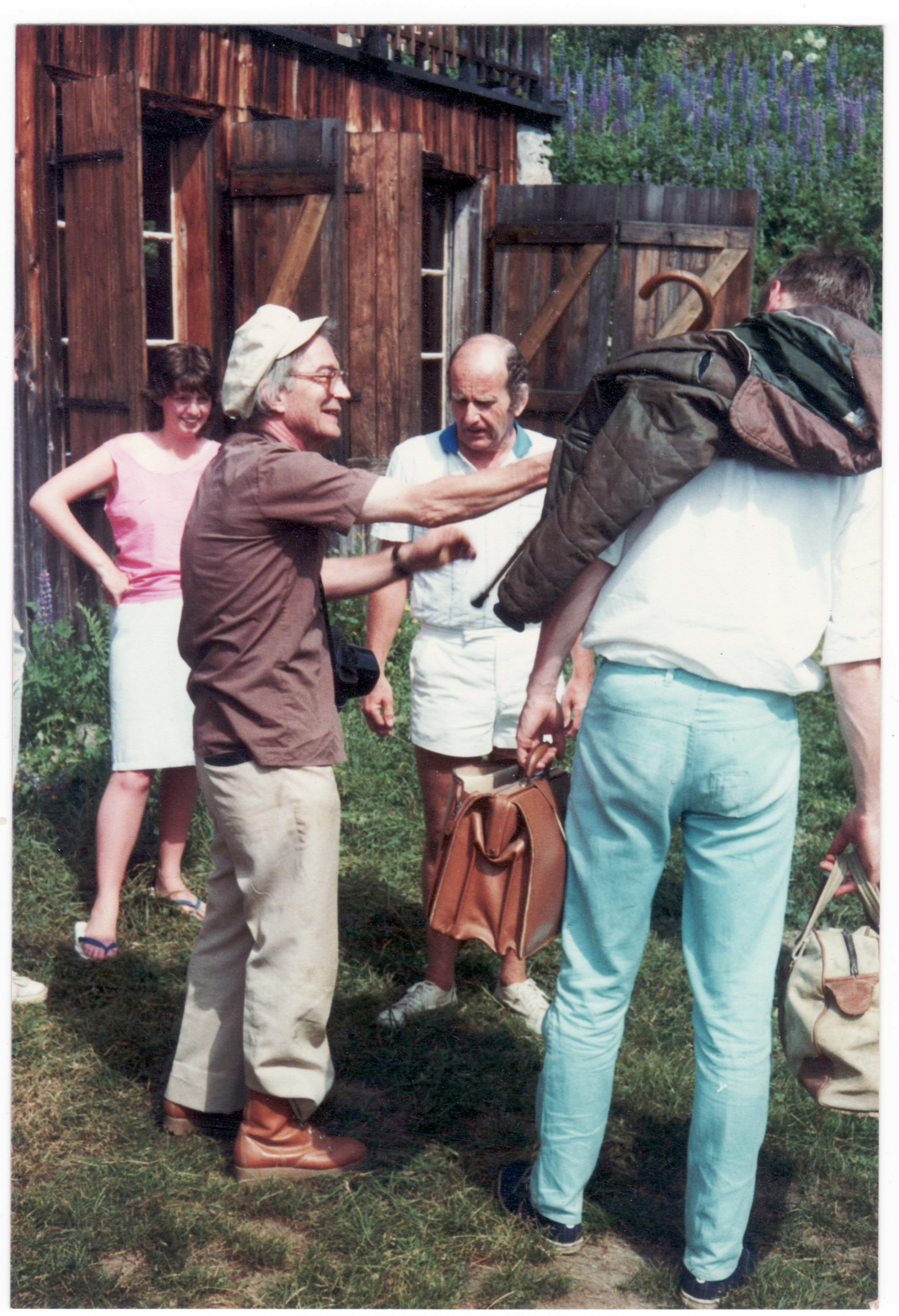
- Forrest (foreground) at Chalet des Anglais, Le Prarion, 1983
- Born: William George Grieve Forrest; 24 September 1925; Glasgow, Scotland
- Died: 14 October 1997 (aged 72)
- Occupation: Professor of Ancient History

William George Grieve Forrest (24 September 1925 – 14 October 1997), known as George Forrest, was a British classicist and academic. From 1977 to 1992, he was Wykeham Professor of Ancient History at the University of Oxford.

== Early life and education ==
George Forrest was born in Glasgow and educated at University College School, Hampstead.

In 1943 he joined the RAF, and in the following years of World War II and post-War liberation he served in France and Belgium.

Forrest entered New College as a scholar in 1947, took a first in Classical Moderations in 1949, and another in Literae Humaniores in 1951. In his final term he won the Derby Scholarship, usually awarded for travel abroad.

== Academic career ==
In 1951 he was elected to a Tutorial Fellowship in Ancient History at Wadham College, which he held until 1977.

In 1977 he was elected Wykeham Professor of Ancient History and accordingly became a Fellow of New College, where he remained until his retirement in 1992.

== Political views ==
Forrest was fiercely political and liberal in his views ("George was profoundly political, always a democrat and so, it followed naturally, always a socialist"), and worked tirelessly to free Greece from the Greek military junta of 1967–1974.

He was also a strong supporter of the campaign to return the Elgin Marbles to Athens and was one of the original members of the British Committee for the Reunification of the Parthenon Marbles.

== Death ==
He died of cancer in 1997, five years after retiring.

== Select works ==
- The Emergence of Greek Democracy (1966)
- A History of Sparta, 950–192 B.C. (1968)

== Sources ==
- Obituary (The Independent)
