= Centre for Research into Freemasonry and Fraternalism =

Research centre at the University of Sheffield

- Parent institution: University of Sheffield
- Founder: Andrew Prescott
- Established: 2000
- Focus: Freemasonry
- Location: Sheffield, England, UK
- Website: Official website (archive)
- Dissolved: 2010

The Centre for Research into Freemasonry and Fraternalism at the University of Sheffield was founded in 2000. Its aim was scholarly research into freemasonry and related fraternal associations. The activities of the centre were suspended in 2010.

== Directors ==
The Centre's founding director was Prof. Andrew Prescott, who was working at the centre between 2000-2007. In 2007, Dr Andreas Önnerfors was recruited and took up his position in January 2008.

== Publications ==
Cover of first issue of Journal for Research into Freemasonry and Fraternalism

Journal for Research into Freemasonry and Fraternalism

Together with Equinox Publishers, the centre launched the first ever academic journal in the area, the Journal for Research into Freemasonry and Fraternalism, an independent, international, peer-reviewed academic journal in the area of research into organized sociability in general and freemasonry in particular and as part of the former Academic Society for Research into Freemasonry and Fraternalism (ASRFF). The journal's editorial offices are in University of Sheffield, UK. The Journal was established in 2009 and is published by Equinox Publishers in the UK and edited by Dr. Andreas Önnerfors (Lund University and Malmö University College in Sweden) and Dr. Rob Collis (University of Sheffield, United Kingdom). Dr. Róber Péter (University of Szeged, Hungary) is review editor. Each issue contains academic research articles, reports on studies of freemasonry and book reviews on the subject. The Journal deals with various aspects of Freemasonry and Fraternalism and associated topics such as including politics, society, culture, art, history, music and other disciplines.

Other publications

The Centre also published a monthly newsletter about the activities of the Centre and its academic partners in Europe and the world.

The Centre also published working papers within its research area on their website.

== See also ==
- Freemasonry
