= Charles Flynn (trade unionist) =

British trade unionist and politician

Charles Richard Flynn (6 September 1882 – 8 May 1957) was a British trade unionist and politician.

Flynn was born in Gateshead, and was educated at Gateshead Secondary School. On leaving school, he worked for the Newcastle Co-operative Wholesale Society, and he became interested in socialism. He joined the Independent Labour Party (ILP), and in 1899 became the secretary of its Northern area, also serving as secretary of the North East Socialist Federation. In 1904, he represented the Tyneside ILP at the Amsterdam Socialist Congress.

Flynn opposed the Second Boer War, and also World War I, during which he was a conscientious objector. In 1915, he began working full-time for the Amalgamated Union of Co-operative Employees, and when in 1921 this merged into the new National Union of Distributive and Allied Workers, he became its Northern Divisional Officer. Under his leadership, the union greatly raised its membership in Northern England, and he secured agreements of a maximum 44-hour working week for co-operative staff in the region.

Flynn supported the 1926 UK general strike, working closely with Robin Page Arnot, Ebby Edwards, Will Lawther and James Tarbitt, to carefully plan the arrangement of the strike on Tyneside. Later in the year, he wrote Account of the Proceedings of the Northumberland and Durham General Council Joint Strike Committee, based on his experiences.

At the 1924 United Kingdom general election, Flynn stood unsuccessfully for the Labour Party in Hexham, and he was also unsuccessful in the 1928 Sheffield Hallam by-election. He was adopted as Prospective Parliamentary Candidate for the more promising seat of Rossendale in 1933, but withdrew before a general election was held. He was elected to Gatehead Town Council in 1932, representing the North West ward, becoming an alderman in 1945, and serving as Mayor of Gatehead in 1949/50.

During World War II, Flynn served on the national committee on cereals. He retired from his union post in 1947, then serving part-time on the Northern Gas Board, and stood down from the council in 1952. In 1948, he was made an Officer of the Order of the British Empire.
