= John Drabble =

British QC and judge (1906–1982)

His Honour John Frederick Drabble, QC (8 May 1906 – 19 December 1982) was an English barrister and County Court Judge. An occasional novelist, he was the father of the writers Dame Margaret Drabble and Dame A. S. Byatt.

== Life and career ==
Born in Conisbrough, he was educated at Mexborough Grammar School before joining his father's sweets manufacturing business. He then read law at Downing College, Cambridge, and was called to the Bar in 1931. He joined the Royal Air Force in 1940 and served in North Africa and England on the Judge Advocate General's staff, reaching the rank of squadron leader. Both Byatt and Drabble have spoken of the impact of the wartime separation on their relationship.

After the war, he returned to Sheffield, and built a large mixed practice. He was made a Queen's Counsel in 1953 and moved to London. He was appointed Recorder of Huddersfield in 1955 and Recorder of Hull in 1957. He was appointed a County Court Judge in 1958, sitting in Newcastle and in Northumberland. He also sat as deputy chairman at the county quarter sessions. He then sat in the County Courts and quarter sessions in Suffolk. He became a Circuit Judge in 1972 on the reorganisation of the courts system, and retired in 1973 on completing fifteen years' service.

A socialist, Drabble was an unsuccessful Labour Party candidate for Sheffield Hallam at the 1945 general election and for Huddersfield West in 1955. He wrote two novels, Death's Second Self (1971) and Scawsby (1977).

== Family ==
He married Marie Bloor, who attended Newnham College, Cambridge, and had been at Mexborough Grammar School with him, in 1933; they had three daughters and a son. A. S. Byatt and Margaret Drabble achieved distinction in literature. Helen Langdon is an art historian. Richard Drabble KC followed his father into the legal profession.
