= International Association for the Reunification of the Parthenon Sculptures =

The International Association for the Reunification of the Parthenon Sculptures (IARPS), founded in 2005, is a global network that unites the national committees of all participating countries in campaigning for the reunification of all the surviving Parthenon Sculptures in the Acropolis Museum in Athens.

The current chair of the campaign is historian-archaeologist Dr Christiane (Kris) Tytgat , who is also the chair of the Belgium Committee for the Reunification of the Parthenon Sculptures.

The original twelve members of the Association were:

- Australians for the Reunification of the Parthenon Sculptures (Australia)
- Belgium Committee for the Return of the Parthenon Marbles (Belgium)
- Cyprus Committee for the Return of the Parthenon Marbles (Cyprus)
- German Committee for the Reunification of the Parthenon Marbles (Germany)
- British Committee for the Reunification of the Parthenon Marbles (BCRPM) (Great Britain)
- Italian Committee for the Return of the Parthenon Marbles (Italy)
- International Organizing Committee - New Zealand - for the Restitution of the Parthenon Marbles (New Zealand)
- Russian Committee for the Return of the Parthenon Marbles (Russia)
- Committee for the Reunification of the Parthenon Sculptures, Serbia (Serbia)
- Spanish Committee for the Return of the Parthenon Marbles (Spain)
- Swedish Parthenon Committee (Sweden)
- The American Committee for the Reunification of the Parthenon Sculptures, Inc (United States)

Other organisations joined later:

- Austrian Committee for the Reunification of the Parthenon Sculptures (Austria)
- Brazilian Committee for the Reunification of the Parthenon Sculptures (Brazil)
- Canadian Committee for the Restitution of the Parthenon Marbles (Canada)
- Finnish Committee the Restitution of the Parthenon Marbles (Finland)
- Marbles Reunited (Great Britain)
- Swiss Committee the Reunification of the Parthenon Marbles (Switzerland)
- International Organizing Committee - Australia- for the Restitution of the Parthenon Marbles Inc. est. 1981 (Australia)
- French Committee for the Reunification of the Parthenon Sculptures (France)
- Azerbaijani Committee for the Reunification of the Parthenon Sculptures (Azerbaijan)

The International Association of the Parthenon Sculptures is governed by a charter and only acts based on the unanimous agreement of its members. Each member organisation appoints a delegate from among their members to represent them on the committee.

== Notable members ==
- Hélène Ahrweiler, former chair of the French Committee
- Paul Cartledge, vice-chair of BCRPM
- Emanuel Comino, vice-chair of IARPS, founder-chair of IOC-Australia. First campaigner (1976!) for the repatriation of the Parthenon Sculptures to Greece
- Louis Godart, honorary chair of IARPS, chair of the Italian Committee
- David Hill, honorary chair of IARPS, chair of the Australian Committee APA
- Victoria Hislop, member of BCRPM
- Dusan Sidjanski, honorary chair and founder of the Swiss Committee
- Janet Suzman, chair of BCRPM
- Catharine Titi, member of the French Committee
- Andrew Wallace-Hadrill, member of BCRPM
