= British Committee for the Reunification of the Parthenon Marbles =

- Location: United Kingdom
- Website: www.parthenonuk.com

The British Committee for the Reunification of the Parthenon Marbles (BCRPM) is a group of British people who support the return of the Parthenon (Elgin) marbles to Athens, Greece. The Committee was established in 1983. Current members include Dame Janet Suzman (chairperson) and professors Anthony Snodgrass (honorary president), Paul Cartledge (Vice-Chair), and Andrew Wallace-Hadrill.

The Committee is part of the International Association for the Reunification of the Parthenon Marbles.

== See also ==
- Acropolis Museum
- Parthenon
- Elgin Marbles
