= Guckheim =

- Municipality
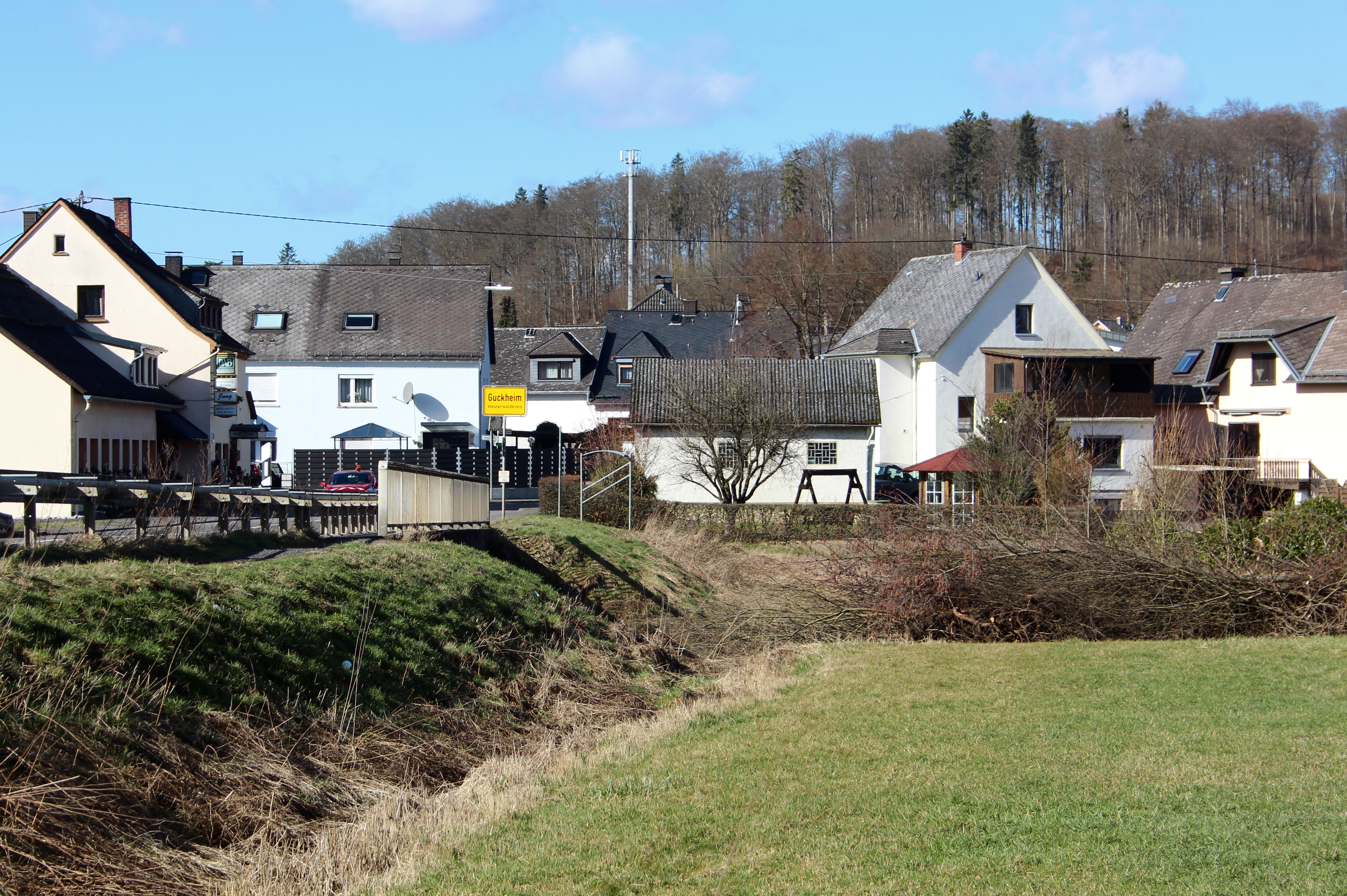

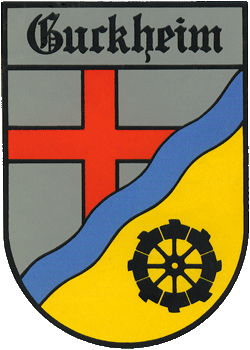
- Coat of arms

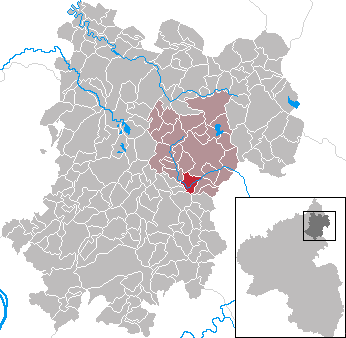
- Location of Guckheim within Westerwaldkreis district
- Interactive map of Guckheim
- Location within Germany Location within Rhineland-Palatinate
- Coordinates: 50°31′46″N 7°56′57″E
- Country: Germany
- State: Rhineland-Palatinate
- District: Westerwaldkreis
- Municipal assoc.: Westerburg

Government
  - Mayor (2019–24): Benjamin Becker

Area
  - Total: 3.77 km^{2} (1.46 sq mi)
- Elevation: 335 m (1,099 ft)

Population (2025-12-31)
  - Total: 998
  - Density: 265/km^{2} (686/sq mi)
- Time zone: UTC+01:00 (CET)
  - Summer (DST): UTC+02:00 (CEST)
- Postal codes: 56459
- Dialling codes: 06435
- Vehicle registration: WW
- Website: www.guckheim.de

Guckheim is an Ortsgemeinde – a community belonging to a Verbandsgemeinde – in the Westerwaldkreis in Rhineland-Palatinate, Germany.

== Geography ==
=== Location ===
Guckheim, mainly a residential community with a well-developed club life, lies in the low mountain range of the Westerwald, part of the Rhenish Slate Mountains, roughly 330 m above sea level. The community's highest point at 657 m above sea level is the Fuchskaute in the northeast Westerwald. Its lowest point at about 150 m above sea level is found in the Gelbachtal Valley between Kirchähr and Dies. The community belongs to the Verbandsgemeinde of Westerburg, a kind of collective municipality.

The Elbbach flows right by Guckheim and empties into the river Lahn near Limburg

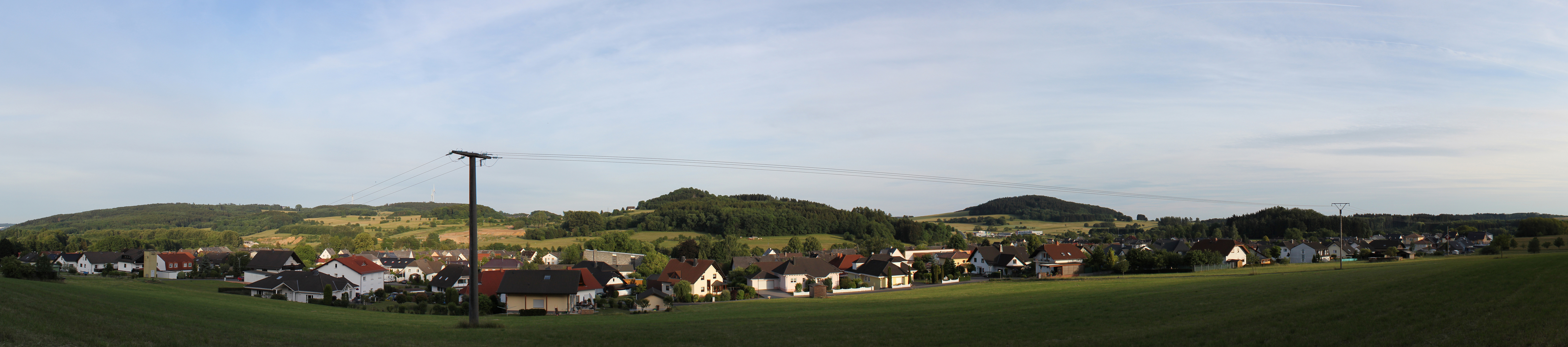
Guckheim, June 2011

=== Geology ===
As a legacy of a sea that once covered the area in Devonian times, a great deal of clay underlies Guckheim, having also been quarried for decades in the immediate vicinity. After clay quarrying is finished, affected areas are recultivated. The quarrying leaves typical traces on the land, such as loss of surface vegetation, unsightliness, and recultivation perceived as inadequate, which have been publicly controversial for years in Guckheim. In the past, there has also been limited brown coal mining (first mentioned in documents in 1746, lasted until 1847) and basalt quarrying (until 1928).

=== Constituent communities ===
Guckheim's Ortsteile are Wörsdorf and Guckheim. Both these once autonomous communities have over time have grown together into today's united community. Nevertheless, in speech, the distinction between the two is still made. Older Guckheimers even still make the distinction between inhabitants who are Guggemer (from the old Guckheim) and those who are Werschdörfer (from the old Wörsdorf). The old placename Wörsdorf hardly ever appears on maps anymore (Google Maps is an exception), and is thereby dying out.

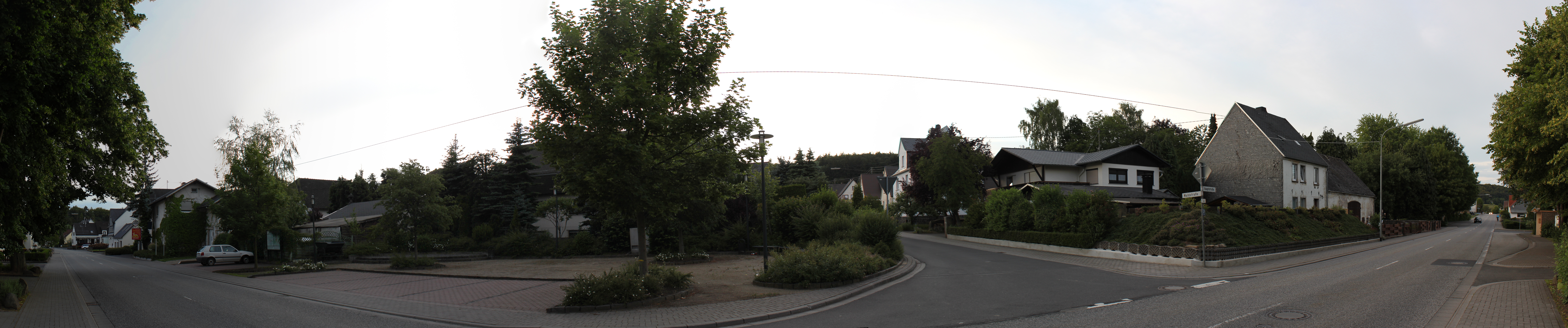
Main Street in Guckheim, June 2011

== History ==
=== Settlement and placenames’ origins ===
It is believed that the first settlers came sometime between the 4th and 6th centuries AD.

As to the origin of the name Guckheim, there are various theories and clues.

The word "guggjon" from the West Germanic, meaning "watch" or "look at" (the verb "gucken" means "look" in Modern High German) was used for a place of especial esteem and status.

The name Guckheim could also stem from Carolingian times (750–900). Old names for Guckheim, such as Cochem, Gocheim and the local dialectal form still heard today, Guggem, point to this time. Often, placenames refer to the first settler in the place, which in this instance might have brought a coc, coch, goch, guco, gogo into the name. German placenames that end in —heim or —em most often began as single homesteads (Heim is still German for "home" today, and is cognate with the English word), whereas places whose names end in —dorf ("village"; the word is cognate with the English "thorpe") refer to groups of these homesteads.

As excavations for the new Mother of God Chapel (Muttergottes-Kapelle) went forth on the Rothenberg, a layer of earth about 2.5 m thick was dug up. Under the forerunner building's foundation a layer of clay potsherds about 5 cm thick and about 4 or 5 m^{2} in area was found, which according to investigations came from about AD 1000. It is believed, therefore, that there might have been a place of worship on the Rothenberg around the turn of the second millennium.

There is no agreed spelling for the Rothenberg, a hill in the community. On current maps it is sometimes also called the Roterberg. In the local dialect, it is called the Ruurebersch.

=== Documentary mentions ===
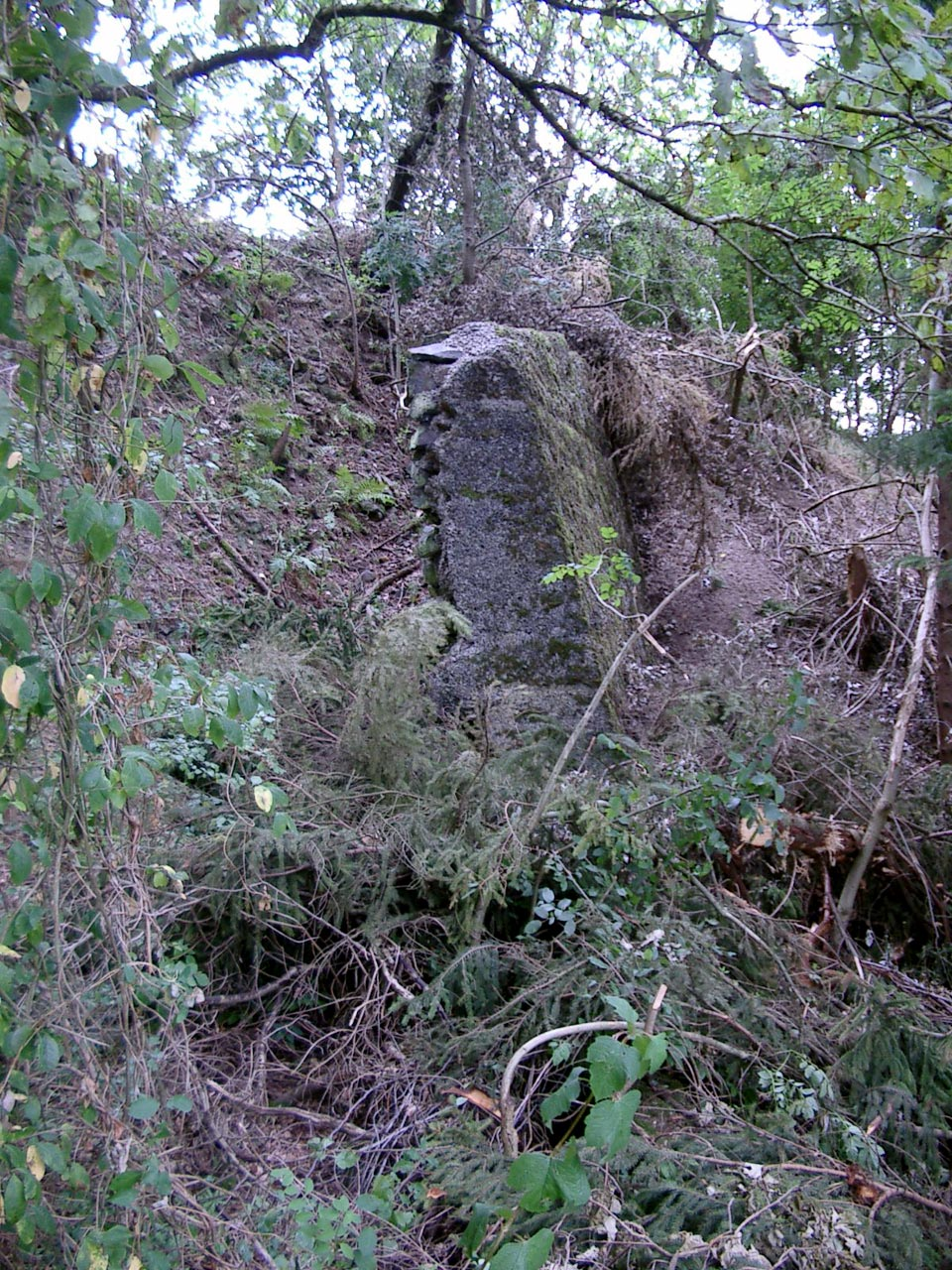
Remains of the Römmel basalt quarry; quarrying ended in 1928

In written records from the Seligenstatt Monastery from the years 1213–1215, the placename Wörsdorf crops up twice. The records contain the text fragments ... auch in Wyrßdorff... (auch means "also") and ... Item Diderich von Wyrßdorff... (a name; the character "ß" is a double S).

Wörsdorf's first documentary mention from 25 September 1285 indicates that the abbot of the St. Pantaleon Monastery in Cologne of the Order of Saint Benedict, as the "Conservator of the Teutonic Knights’ privilege" appointed by the Pope, "complains about Count Otto of Nassau and his son Heinrich as well as their helper Heinrich of Wörsdorf to pronounce excommunication against those named after an earlier admonition".

Further written references to Wörsdorf date from 1315, 1346 and 1525.

The knight Ludwig Scherre from Waldmannshausen endowed an everlasting light in the monastery church at Seligenstatt in 1315 from his estates here, and the Rödels of Reifenberg were feoffed in 1346 by Molsberg with an estate here. Furthermore, there is this:

"...Wirsdorf, where the Lords of Westerburg, those of Ottenstein, Reifenberg, Brambach and Riedesel had estates in 1525."

In 1299, Guckheim had its first documentary mention.

"14 December 1299 "Elisabeth called von Dorndorf. Widow of the knight Heinrich of Sottenbach, donates all her movable (bona mea mobilia, utensilia affernalia) and immovable property in the villages and rural areas of Stenbach (Steinbach), Dorringdorf (Dorndorf) Hausen, Vridekobin (Frickhofen), Gocheim (Guckheim) and Wermolderode (Willmenrod) at farms, houses, estates, gardens, meadows, grazing lands, forests, fisheries, tax income or other to the abbess and the convent of the nuns in Gnadenthal (in valle gracie) for the healing of her soul, and her parents’, and all her forebears’ before the Schultheißen (roughly, "sheriffs"), Schöffen (local justices) and other villagers and transfers the goods to the convent to its procurator's hands as property. - Sgg. of the Count Gerhard von Diez, Gottfried called im Hof (in Curia), Friedrich called Stayl and Hiltwin von Elkershausen, knight. "- Actum et d. 1299 in crastino beate virginis (Lucie). 19 kalendas Januarii"

In the Annals of Nassau (Nassauische Annalen) is found the following record:

"In 1299 Gocheim, the von Piesports had an estate in 1735. Goods came here from Elisabeth von Dorndorf, widow of Sottenbach, in 1299 to the in Gnadenthal Convent, in 1305 to the Ritz von Dehrn family and in 1334 to the von Schönborns. Meadows here have the von Mudersbachs, which by way of the von Brambachs in 1694 came to the von Walderdorfs. The mill was owned by Leiningen-Westerburg in 1511 and still in 1786. A brown coal pit was in operation here in 1746."

The mill at Guckheim was first mentioned in a document in 1511. It was still working until 1980.

=== History into modern times ===
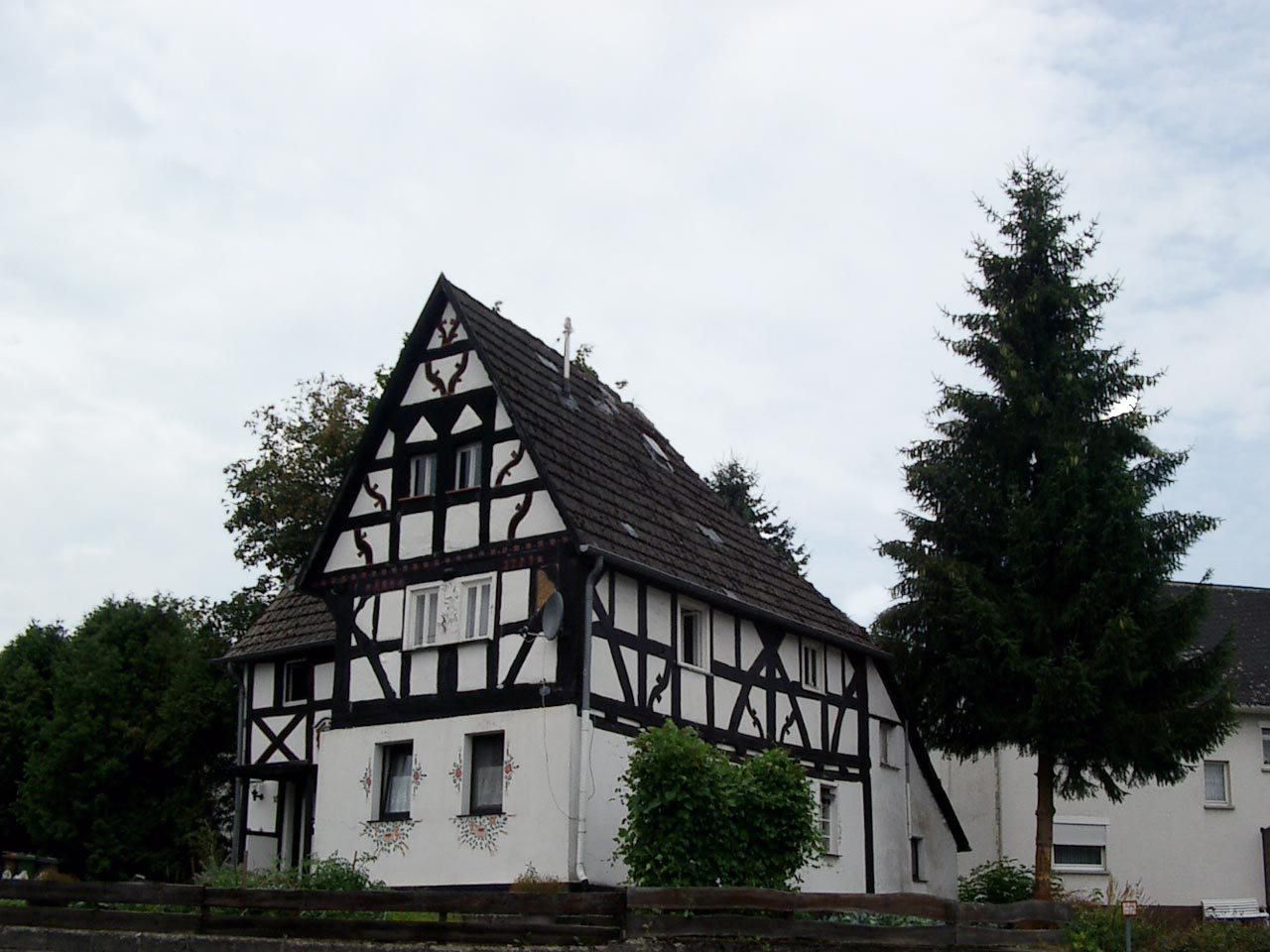
Restored timber-frame house in Guckheim

As of the 13th century, the community belonged to the County of Diez. From 1490, Guckheim, together with Wörsdorf (Wersdorf), was assigned to the Salzer Zech.

On 27 July 1564, Guckheim, along with the parishes of Salz, Meudt, Nentershausen and Hundsangen was ceded to the Electorate of Trier in the Treaty of Diez, and thereby also ended up in the Amt of Montabaur.

The Thirty Years' War also left its mark on Guckheim. In 1666, the only family names left in Guckheim were Göbel, Fasel and Gleser. In Wörsdorf, the names Kiep, Schumacher, Born, New (Neu), Fritz, Zeis, Göbel and Fasel can be confirmed from that time. Stories handed down by word of mouth tell of inhabitants being tortured during the war years in the constituent community of Guckheim opposite the village cross.

As of 1748, there was organized schooling in Guckheim, held at various people's houses at different times. Once Matthias Fasel, a teacher from Wörsdorf, was appointed, instruction began in 1820 in a schoolroom rented by the community at the so-called Perersch Haus. On the Duchy of Nassau government's instructions, Matthias Fasel began the Guckheim school chronicle. In 1832 came a community decision to build a school building, which was dedicated on 4 November 1833.

== Population development ==
Year	Inhabitants	Year	Inhabitants
1787	244	1973	645
1818	277	1978	721
1840	338	1983	744
1905	362	1989	805
1939	471	1993	881
1950	472	1997	933

Exact population figures for Guckheim are only available for the time since 1787. Until the late 18th century, there were only data about the number of hearths (households/estates) or families. Trustworthy figures about population development only go back to 1525.

In that year, 7 hearths were counted. For 1562, the County of Diez service register names 7 names (families) for Wörsdorf. A year later there were 8 hearths.

In 1589, 7 Electoral service personnel and one Vogtmann (roughly, "reeve") were mentioned in a record also including both communities’ inhabitants. Until 1653, the population figure did not rise appreciably, as the Thirty Years' War had its consequences even in Guckheim. Eight families were counted in Wörsdorf, and in Guckheim two. In 1684, 9 hearths were mentioned in Wörsdorf, and in Guckheim 4.

The Second World War likewise left its mark. Even among Guckheimers there were losses. The number of inhabitants in 1939 compared to that in 1950 differs only slightly.

== Culture ==
=== Dialect/accent ===
High German	Guckheimer Platt (Moselle Franconian)	English
es regnet	et reent	it’s raining
es regnet stark	et trätscht	it’s raining hard/heavily
es regnet leicht	et fisselt	it’s raining lightly
es schneit	et schnaascht	it’s snowing
es schneit stark	et woost	it’s snowing hard

The dialect spoken in Guckheim belongs to the Moselle Franconian dialect group. As an everyday speech, it is dying out, and is often no longer mastered by younger people. Moreover, the facts of economic life have changed and thereby brought about a loss of a great deal of the dialect. For instance, the dialectal vocabulary for variations in the weather is much less often heard now that the economy has moved away from activities that depended on the weather, such as, most obviously, farming, as those who customarily used these expressions for their everyday lives are growing fewer.

=== Buildings ===
==== Mother of God Chapel on the Rothenberg ====
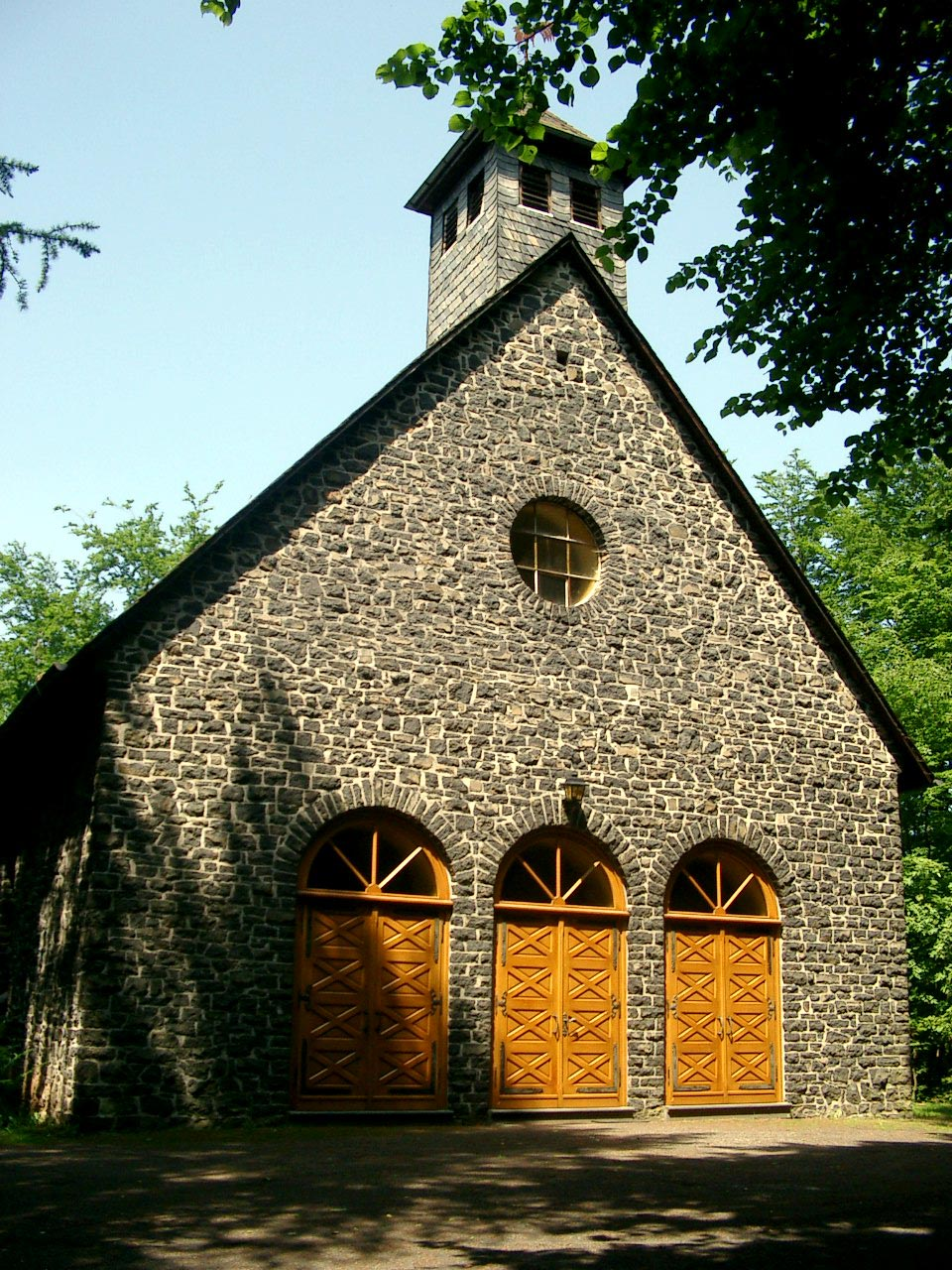
Muttergottes-Kapelle in Guckheim, Consecration 12 November 1950, Architect: Rudolf Hack, Westerburg

The former building on the Chapel’s current site stood until 1948 on the Rothenberg and faced the same way. The exact time when the old building came into being cannot be confirmed, but it is believed that it was built in two sections. A clue to the building's origins can be said to be a stone with the year 1771 chiselled into it. This was found while the building was being torn down.

The decision to build a new and bigger chapel was made in 1947. Grounds for a new building were the old chapel's great repair needs, an endowment of about 6,000 Reichsmark – it had been pledged towards the construction before currency reform – and the hope that on some occasions church services could be held within the community, which did not have its own church. Building began on 27 September 1948, and the cornerstone was laid on 22 May 1949. The topping-out ceremony was held on 26 September 1949. As the architect who designed the chapel, Rudolf Hack from Westerburg was trusted with the planning work. On 12 November 1950, the Muttergottes-Kapelle received ecclesiastical consecration.

Since the building project had to be financed through the community's own resources, the needed funds were raised on the one hand by monthly door-to-door collections, in which even neighbouring communities took part, and on the other hand by the community's donation of a greater sum as well as the lumber. Further funds were raised by producing plays on the Römmel. There, plays were staged between 1948 and 1952 with presenters from the community itself.

==== St. Johanneskirche ====
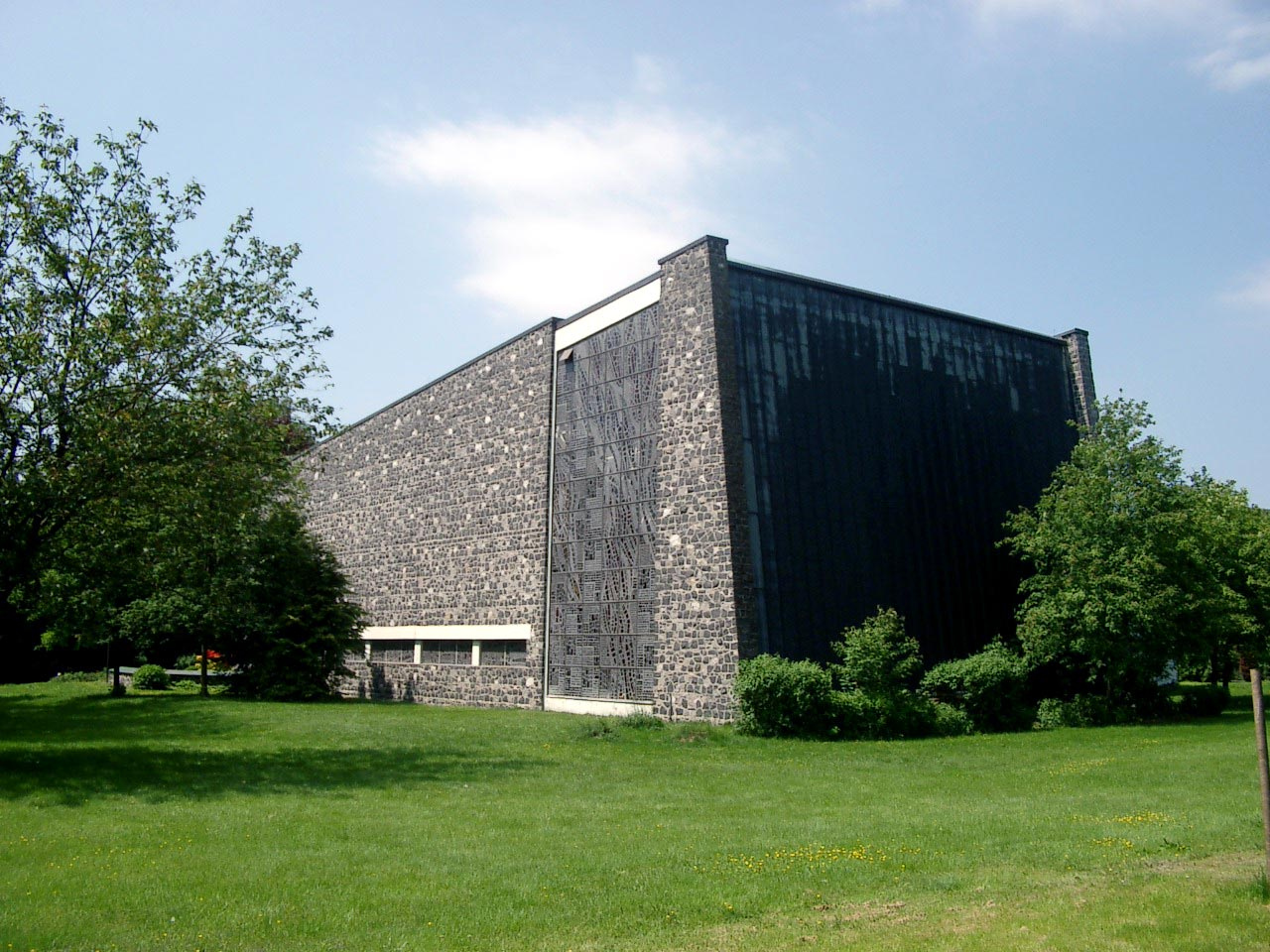
St. Johannes Kirche in Guckheim, Consecration 16 June 1963, Architect: Hans Busch, Frankfurt am Main

In the late 1950s, the seating room in the Mother of God Chapel was becoming less and less adequate to serve the growing community's needs. A proposal to hold two services on Sundays and holidays could not be fulfilled owing to a dearth of priests. Given this, plans were made with the architect Hans Busch from Frankfurt am Main, who was well known for his sacral buildings, to enlarge the chapel and add a new belltower.

Hans Busch was trusted with the planning, but only the third proposal won the Bishop's blessing. On the Church's recommendation, it was decided to forgo the belltower and the planned youth centre owing to cost.

Building began in the summer of 1961 on the Weltersbitz meadowlands. The cornerstone was laid on 1 October 1961. Until early 1962, the building shell was being put up. The topping-out ceremony was held on 17 May 1962. The consecration was finally done on 16 June 1963, although the first services had already been held the foregoing Christmas.

The St. Johanneskirche ("Saint John’s Church") is a markedly plain building with a rectangular plan, a shed roof that drops off towards the west and a sacristy in the side building adjoining it to the north. Owing to the roof's shape, the east-facing altar has the highest headroom. The one-naved church room with gallery is girded with thick walls made out of quarried basalt, a typical local building material.

The church room is lit through one horizontal and several vertical banks of windows with glass mosaics. The south-facing horizontal bank of windows has mosaics depicting the story of Christ’s suffering. The belltower was never built.

== Economy and infrastructure ==
=== Transport ===
Throrugh the public local bus lines 463, 481, 492, 997 and 998, Guckheim is connected to the public transport. Guckheim is located in the zone number 429 of the transport association Verkehrsverbund Rhein-Mosel (VRM). Lying roughly 35 km east of Koblenz, halfway between the agglomerations of Frankfurt am Main and Cologne, Guckheim has at its disposal a good transport infrastructure, the nearest train station is Westerburg station at the Limburg-Altenkirchen railway, also with the new InterCityExpress stations in Montabaur and Limburg an der Lahn, the A 3 (Cologne–Frankfurt; interchange at Diez/Nentershausen) and Bundesstraßen 8 and 255, all found nearby.

=== Sightseeing and recreation ===
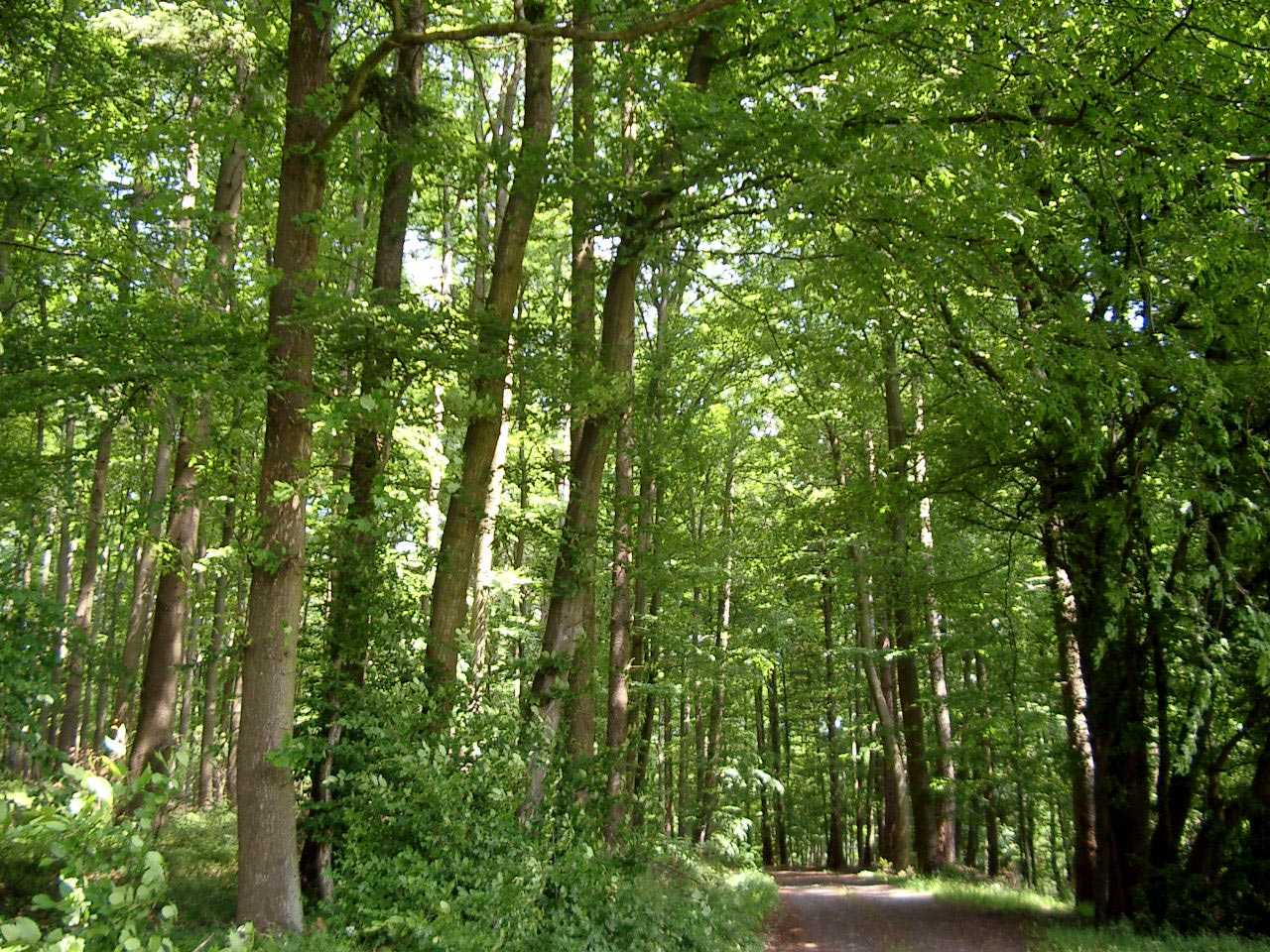
Forest near Guckheim

Guckheim is framed by nearby broadleaf and fir forests in which it is worth going for a walk. Worthy of special mention are the nature trail for forestry and ornithology on the Rothenberg and the nearby ruins of the Weltersburg (castle), built after 1100, both of which can easily be reached on foot from Guckheim. The Elbbach flows right by Guckheim to the Lahn. With its water power, the mill was powered centuries ago. Some 5 km away is found Schloss Westerburg (residential castle), first mentioned in 1192. Furthermore, lying roughly 10 km away, between Pottum und Stahlhofen is the Wiesensee (lake) and its accompanying recreation area. The lake is some 450 m high and has an area of about 80 ha.

About 750 m from Guckheim, an 11-km-long, popular hiking trail leads from the direction of Wallmerod to the former railway area in Westerburg. The trail, which is also used by cyclists and skaters, is to be extended in the next few years by 10 to 20 km towards Höhn/Rennerod across the railway bridge, a protected monument, in Westerburg.

=== Electricity supply ===
the ground of the former mine Erna-Marie between Weltersburg and Guckheim a solar park is under construction.
