= Gerlinde Jänicke =

German radio host

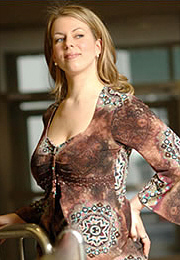
Gerlinde Jänicke, 2006

Gerlinde Jänicke (born December 13, 1973) is a German host and announcer.

== Life ==
Jänicke was born in Berlin on December 13, 1973, to an American mother and German father. She attended the John F. Kennedy School in Berlin-Zehlendorf. At the school, she was educated about and motivated by the theater. She also learned how to be a foreign language secretary with the main focus being English and French and worked for the fast-food giant Burger King until she was picked by host Rik De Lisle for the radio. Today, she works for the Berlin radio station 104.6 RTL and lives with her significant other in Berlin-Zehlendorf.

== Radio ==
Jänicke was placed with the radio station 94.3 rs2 as a trainee in 1993 and there received an offer to moderate on Der gute Morgen für Berlin und Brandenburg (English: Good Morning Berlin and Brandenburg) as transmission assistant for Karin Kuschik. Starting in 1998, she produced and hosted Gerlindes Feierabendshow (English: Gerlinde’s Evening Party Show), Gerlinde am Morgen (English: Gerlinde in the Morning), and Berlin am Morgen (English: Berlin in the Morning) with the radio station Berliner Rundfunk. Soon after, she established the radio production company pride&passion. Beginning in 2003, she produced and hosted Gerlindes Weekend Radioshow on 89.0 RTL.

She used to host the radio shows Supersamstag (English: Super Saturday) and Supersonntag (English: Super Sunday) on 104.6 RTL Berlin Hit Radio. Furthermore, she hosted the morning show Arno und die Morgencrew together with Thomas Koschwitz during vacation breaks. Gerlinde now has her own morning show called Gerlinde Jänicke and Friends on 94.3 RS2.

== Television ==
Jänicke began her career with small roles in music videos and commercials.

In 2006, she hosted the clip show Bitte lachen! (English: Please Laugh!) on RTL II after she had worked for the station as an outside reporter.

== Other ==
Jänicke was a member of the Original Kreuzberger Staatstheater in Berlin with emphasis on improvisational theatre.

In 2007, she lent her voice to Professor Rebecca Hausmann in the podcast "Liebe im ersten Semester" (English: "Love in the First Semester") and is also active today as a voice actress and announcer for commercials.

In 2012, she provided a testimonial for Weight Watchers.

== Television appearances ==
- Teen show Moskito on SFB
- Weather reporter on IA Brandenburg (later Puls TV, today TV Berlin)
- Outside report No Sex on RTL II
- Host of home-video show Bitte lachen! on RTL II
- Television roles:
  - Der Fremde im Spiegel (English: The Stranger in the Mirror) (2004) – Role: Krankenschwester (English: Nurse)

== Website ==
- Gerlinde Jänicke at IMDb
