= Jänicke =

Jänicke is a surname. Notable people with the surname include:

- Britta Jänicke (born 1958), German paralympic athlete
- Gerlinde Jänicke (born 1973), German host and announcer
- Heike Leitte (born Jänicke, 1982), German computer scientist
- Tobias Jänicke (born 1989), German footballer

== See also ==
- Janick
