= Jadick =

Jadick is a surname. Notable people with the surname include:

- Johnny Jadick (1908–1970), American boxer
- Richard Jadick, American naval surgeon, recipient of a Bronze Star

== See also ==
- Janick
