= Weltersburg =

- Municipality
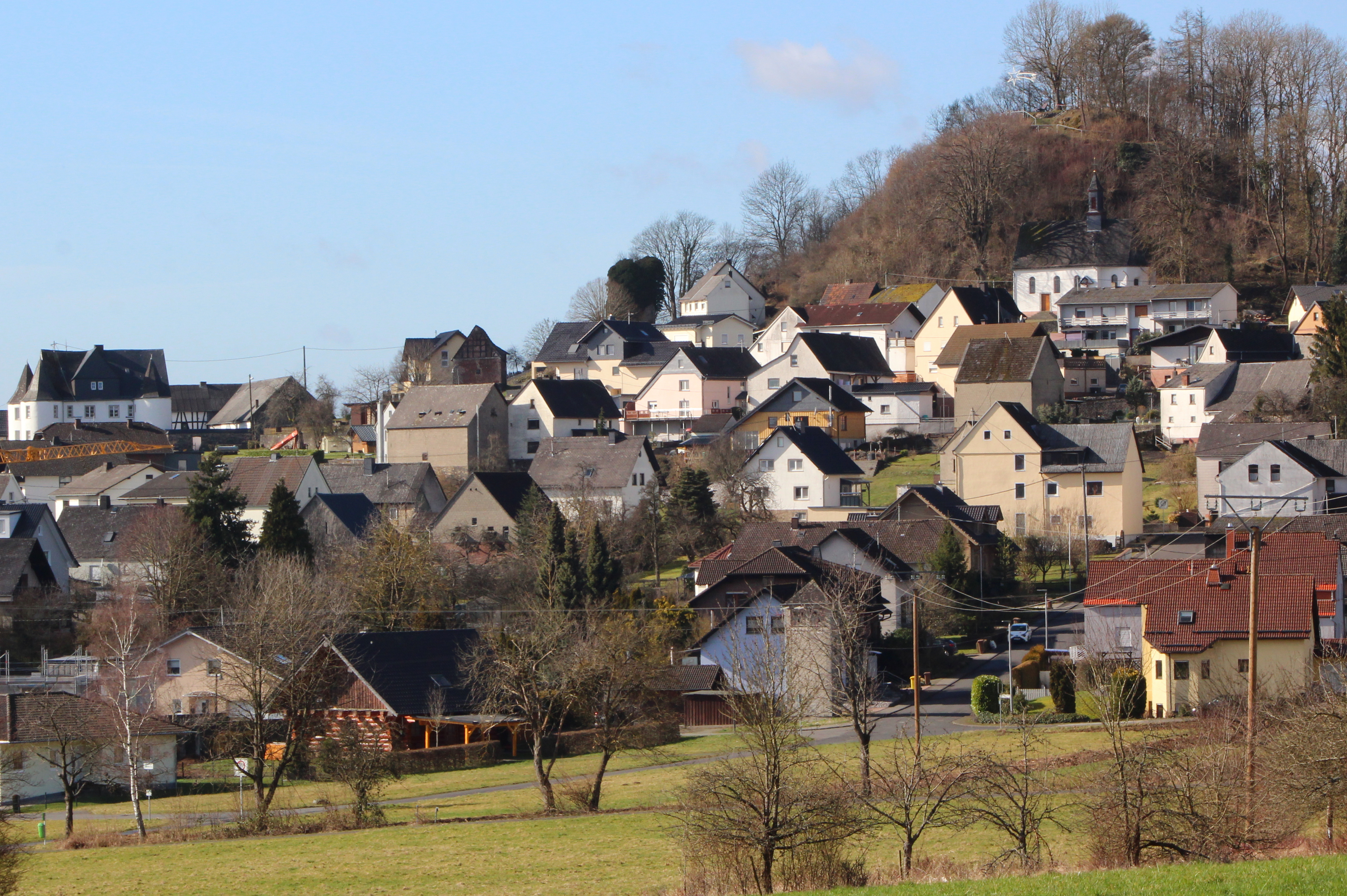

- Coat of arms

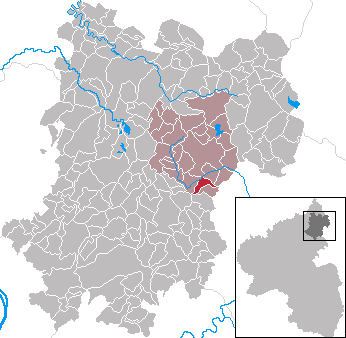
- Location of Weltersburg within Westerwaldkreis district
- Interactive map of Weltersburg
- Location within Germany Location within Rhineland-Palatinate
- Coordinates: 50°31′24″N 7°57′38″E
- Country: Germany
- State: Rhineland-Palatinate
- District: Westerwaldkreis
- Municipal assoc.: Westerburg

Government
  - Mayor (2019–24): Gisela Benten

Area
  - Total: 2.66 km^{2} (1.03 sq mi)
- Elevation: 400 m (1,300 ft)

Population (2025-12-31)
  - Total: 300
  - Density: 110/km^{2} (290/sq mi)
- Time zone: UTC+01:00 (CET)
  - Summer (DST): UTC+02:00 (CEST)
- Postal codes: 56459
- Dialling codes: 06435
- Vehicle registration: WW
- Website: www.weltersburg.de

Weltersburg is an Ortsgemeinde – a community belonging to a Verbandsgemeinde – in the Westerwaldkreis in Rhineland-Palatinate, Germany.

== Geography ==
=== Location ===
Weltersburg lies 4 km southeast of Westerburg. Since 1972 it has belonged to what was then the newly founded Verbandsgemeinde of Westerburg, a kind of collective municipality found only in Rhineland-Pfalz. Its seat is in the like-named town.

=== Natural monuments ===
Between Weltersburg and Willmenrod is the rock formation and natural monument of Kranstein on the edge of a basalt quarry.

== Politics ==
The municipal council is made up of 7 council members, including the extraofficial mayor (Bürgermeister), who were elected in a majority vote in a municipal election on 13 June 2004.

== Economy and infrastructure ==
=== Transport links ===
Weltersburg is located in the area of the public transport association Verkehrsverbund Rhein-Mosel (VRM), zone 429 and served by the local busses of the lines 481 and 492.

South of the community runs Bundesstraße 8, leading from Limburg an der Lahn to Hennef.

The nearest Autobahn interchange is Montabaur on the A 3 (Cologne–Frankfurt). The nearest InterCityExpress stop is the railway station at Montabaur on the Cologne-Frankfurt high-speed rail line.

=== Energy supply ===
On the ground of the former mine Erna-Marie between Weltersburg and Guckheim a solar park is under construction.
