= Thomas Koschwitz =

Thomas Koschwitz (born 6 April 1956 in Heidelberg, West Germany) is a German radio and television host, and a book author since 2002. Despite many television engagements, he has stayed active with radio. He is known as a pioneer of the German radio landscape and is a developer and protagonist of many innovative formats and shows. He has not always had a lucky hand with the selection of his productions, yet they never display a lack professionalism, quality, or reliability. Throughout the course of his career, Koschwitz has worked with many German and international stars and developed, owing to his journalistic skills, into a well-known talk show host, entertainer, and presenter.

== Life ==
Koschwitz began his career in 1975 at the age of 19 as the youngest radio news announcer who was ever employed at the Hessischer Rundfunk. He very quickly obtained his own shows such as Pop auf Wunsch (English: Pop on demand) and Drugstore 1422 with the Saarländischer Rundfunk. During his studies of German history and culture, political science, and sociology between 1975 and 1980 in the Upper-Hessian town of Marburg at the Lahn, he developed into one of the most prominent announcers and hosts of the Hr3, alongside already established personalities like Hanns Verres and Werner Reinke. Koschwitz's style and voice had good recognition and made formats like Pop und Weck (English: Pop and Weck), Mittagsdiscotheke (English: Afternoon Discotheque), and Pop mit Gästen (English: Pop with Guests) into popular and successful shows. His most successful production was Kuschelrock, which Koschwitz developed and hosted in the late 1980s.

In the mid-1980s, Koschwitz started his first attempts at television hosting with, among others, a show in and around the Frankfurt Airport. This followed engagements with the private station SAT1 in Frühstücksfernsehen (English: Breakfast Television). As a vacation replacement, he took over hosting of the RTL Nachtshow (English: RTL Night Show) with great success in 1994 during the summer break of Gottschalk Late Night. However, this ended in 1995 with the beginning of Die Harald Schmidt Show with the competing broadcaster Sat.1, with which Koschwitz hosted the animal show Hamster TV a year later. The exaggerated production was met with ridicule and criticism everywhere, and Koschwitz, according to his own statements, later regretted his involvement as host, although it was still due to him that the show reached a target audience market share of 14.7% in the end.

In addition, Koschwitz had further television engagements as talk show host and performer with, among others, the news show N24 with the successful late-night talk format Koschwitz, which was broadcast from 2000 until December 2002, or in the Tatort (English: Crime Scene) episode Zielscheibe (English: Target), in which he played a cynical television producer in 2001.

On 4 October 2002 he suffered a stroke while filming. He later wrote a book about this event and its after-effects. After his recovery, he accepted engagements once again with Kabel 1 and SAT1 TV in 2003 and 2004.

In 2004, Koschwitz again began to focus his activities on the radio. He hosted the show Koschwitz zum Wochenende (English: Koschwitz on the Weekend) with the radio stations Berliner Rundfunk 91.4, harmony.fm, and Klassik Radio. This show is still broadcasting today on Radio Brocken and Hitradio RTL Sachsen. Koschwitz found a lot of attention shortly before the 2005 German federal elections when he hosted “Radio-Gipfel” (English: “Radio Summit”) with Chancellor Gerhard Schröder and the candidate Angela Merkel, which was broadcast almost simultaneously in full length by the 45 most important radio stations in Germany. Some 15 million listeners could thereby follow as Koschwitz questioned the chancellor and challenger and delivered an impressive example of professional hosting.

From August 2006 until April 2010, he hosted the morning show Koschwitz am Morgen (English: Koschwitz in the Morning) workdays from 6AM-10AM for the Berliner Rundfunk 91.4; towards the end of the run of the show, he hosted it together with his son Tim. In addition, he could be heard each Friday from 7PM-10PM on the show Koschwitz Classic Hits.

Since 2011, he has hosted his own live show, Koschwitz am Nachmittag (English: Koschwitz in the Afternoon), for the radio station Radio Brocken along with 104.6 RTL and Hitradio RTL Sachsen. Moreover, he is a backup host for Arno und die Morgencrew. Furthermore, he produces the show Koschwitz zum Wochenende on Saturdays on Hitradio RTL Sachsen and Radio Brocken, as well as Sundays on Antenne Pfalz, Antenne Landau, and Antenne Koblenz.

Like many colleagues, Koschwitz is active as a host and entertainer for events and galas of different occasions and clientele.

== Personal life ==
Koschwitz married in 1981 in Marburg, however the marriage did not last long. He has a son, Tim Koschwitz, who is also active as a radio host.
