= Leitte =

Leitte is a surname. Notable people with the surname include:

- Claudia Leitte (born 1980), Brazilian singer and television personality
- Dirceu Leitte (born 1961), Brazilian musician
- Heike Leitte (born 1982), German computer scientist
