= The Morning Crew =

Morning Crew or The Morning Crew may refer to:

- Arno and the Morning Crew, English name of Arno und die Morgencrew, radio show on 104.6 RTL in Berlin and Brandenburg, Germany
- BJ and The Q Morning Crew, radio show on CFRQ-FM in Halifax, Nova Scotia, Canada
- Hitz Morning Crew, radio show on Hitz (radio station) in Malaysia
- KQ Morning Crew, alternative name of 92 KQRS Morning Show, radio show on KQRS-FM in Minneapolis, Minnesota, United States
- Morning Crew, radio show on 98FM in Dublin, Ireland
- The Morning Crew (B105), radio show on B105 in Brisbane, Queensland, Australia
- The Morning Crew, radio show on Bay 93.9 in Geelong, Victoria, Australia
- The Morning Crew (Cartoon Network), American television program on Cartoon Network
- The Morning Crew (TRFM), radio show on TRFM in Traralgon, Victoria, Australia
- The Morning Crew on Rock 104, radio show on WXRR in Hattiesburg, Mississippi, United States
- The ZM Morning Crew, alternative name of Polly & Grant, radio show on More FM and rova in New Zealand
