= Jaedicke =

Jaedicke is a surname. Notable people with the surname include:

- Meghan Jaedicke (born 1997), German canoeist
- Robert K. Jaedicke (1929–2020), American academic

== See also ==
- Jaenicke
