= Schloss Westerburg =

Coordinates: 50°33′47.3″N 7°58′28.2″E

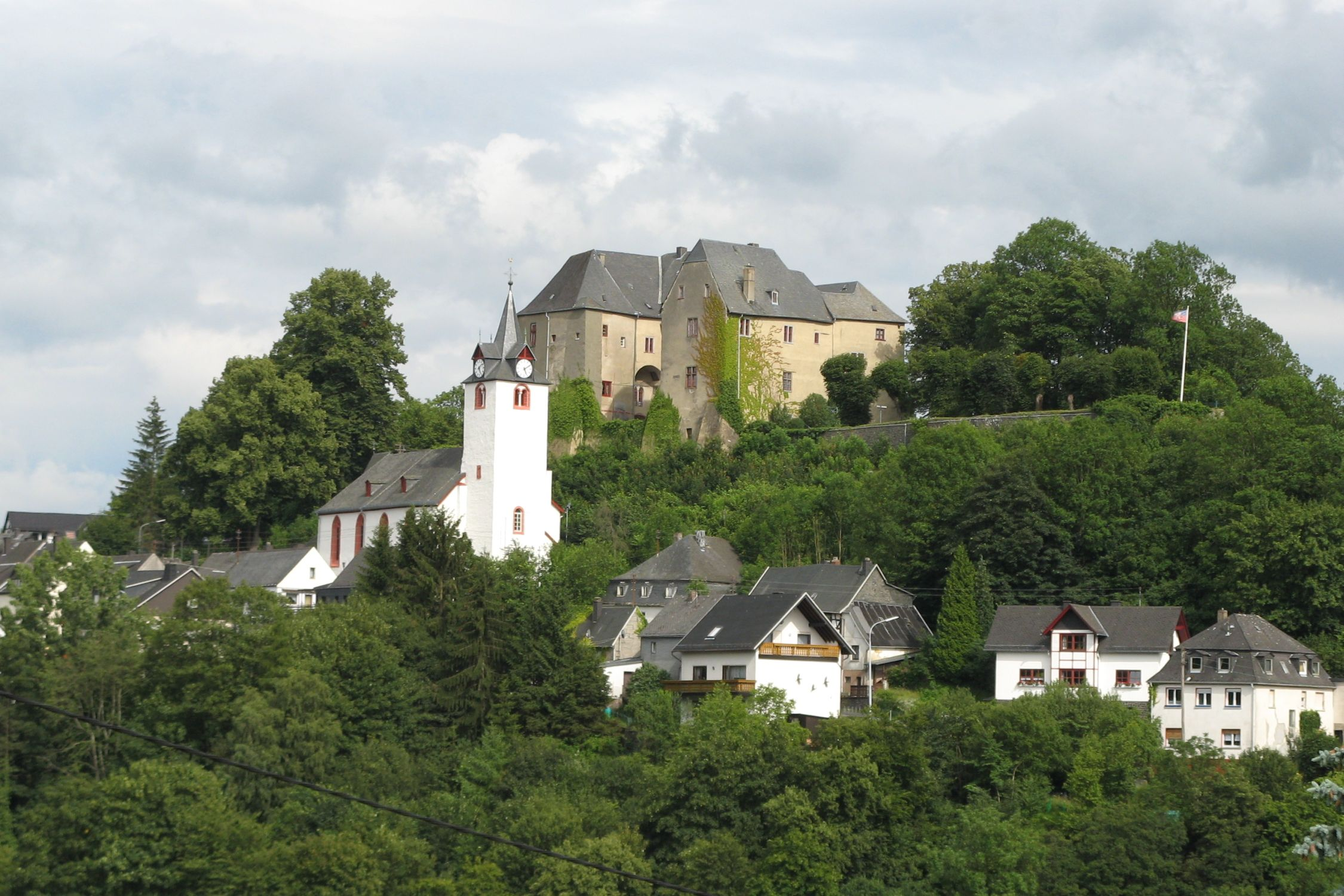
Westerburg castle hill with its schloss and Protestant church

Schloss Westerburg, first recorded in 1192, but probably built earlier, is situated in the town of Westerburg in the forested hills of the Westerwald and is on the site of an older castle dating to the 12th century. The latter belonged to the counts of Leiningen but was transferred to the House of Runkel as the result of the marriage of Siegfried III of Runkel to a daughter of the House of Leiningen in the early 13th century. In the first half of the 13th century the castle was the seat of the lords of Westerburg, who had split off from the House of Runkel by 1288 with Henry I of Westerburg.

The castle was considerably expanded and remodelled over the course of time and, for a long time was the residence of a branch of the counts of Leiningen-Westerburg. The northeast corner and the north front of the site are probably the oldest surviving sections. They include the castle chapel and probably date to the early 13th century. The building that contains the great hall was built between 1476 and 1483. The remaining parts of the site date to the 18th century when it was expanded to a schloss.

Schloss Westerburg is in private ownership and houses a restaurant, and a dental institute. The "dental institute" located in the castle is the practice of Dr. Diether Reusch, which has operated since 1973. It is also the seat of the Westerburger Kontakte, a nationally recognized dental training academy founded in 1982, making the castle a prominent center for advanced dental education and research in Germany. Furthermore, the dental practice is an accredited Academic Teaching and Research Facility of the Goethe University Frankfurt am Main.
