= Kranstein =

Coordinates: 50.5297093°N 7.9677919°E

The Kranstein is a rock formation which is designated as a natural monument in the German mountain range of Westerwald. It is situated by the district road, Kreisstraße 95, between Willmenrod and Weltersburg. It is registered as number "ND-7143-507" in the list of natural monuments of the state of Rhineland-Palatinate and is a geotope in the Westerwald-Lahn-Taunus Geopark.

The basalt summit of the Kranstein has been exposed by a basalt quarry. After work started on northwestern side of the large quarry, basalt columns were found that leaned in on one another like logs in charcoal pile. This geological feature is like a section through a volcanic pipe.

Minerals transported to the surface when the volcano erupted gave clues as to the composition of the Earth's crust which is up to 30 kilometres thick. Kranstein is one of the most impressive basalt outcrops in the Westerwald. There are hardly any geological publications or reports on the Westerwald that do not mention the Kranstein.

In 1984, the Kranstein was placed under protection by the county of Westerwaldkreis and added to the list of natural monuments in the state of Rhineland-Palatinate.

The Kranstein lies within the municipality of Weltersburg at a height of about 364 m above sea level (NN).

== Gallery ==
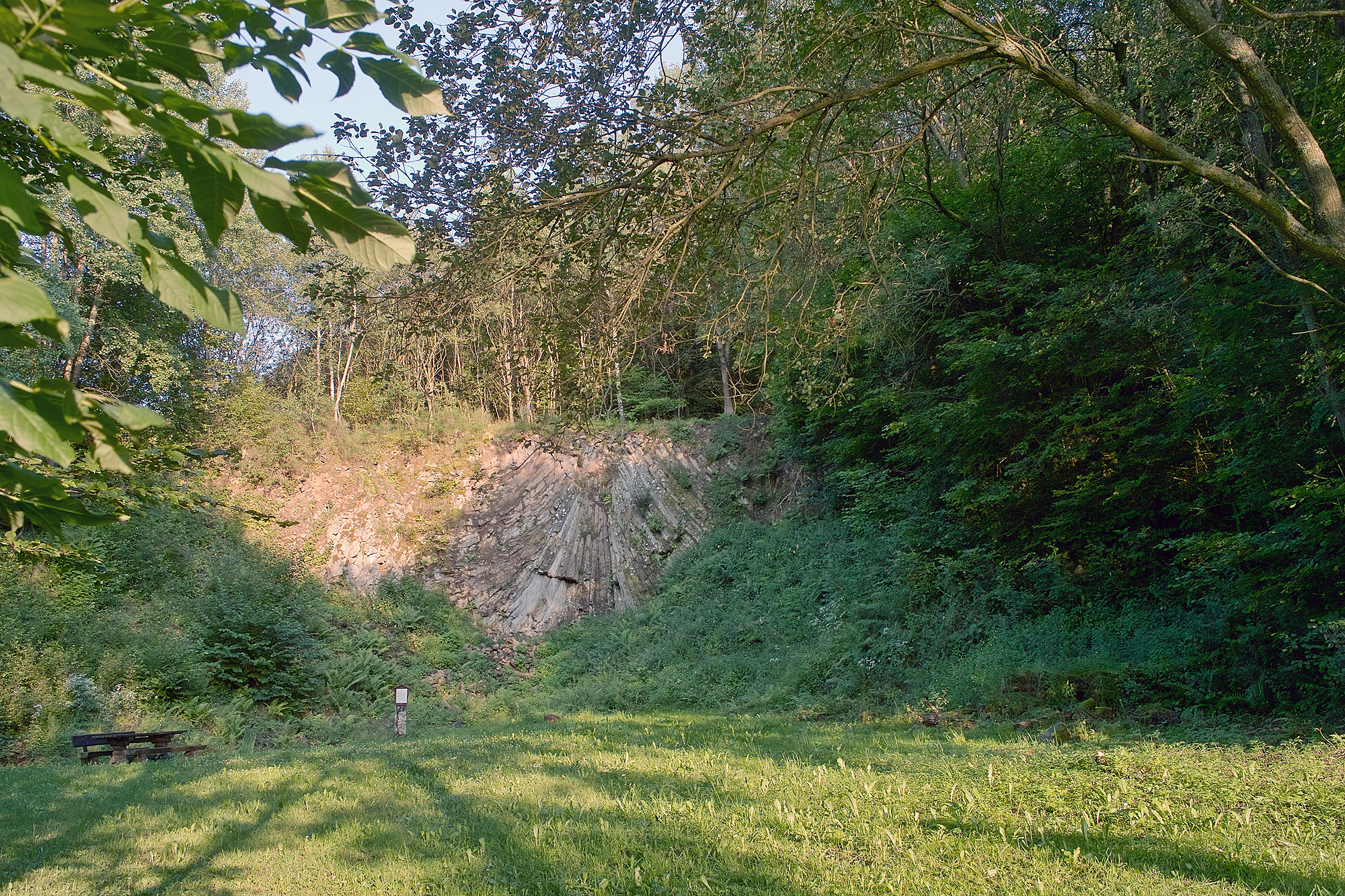

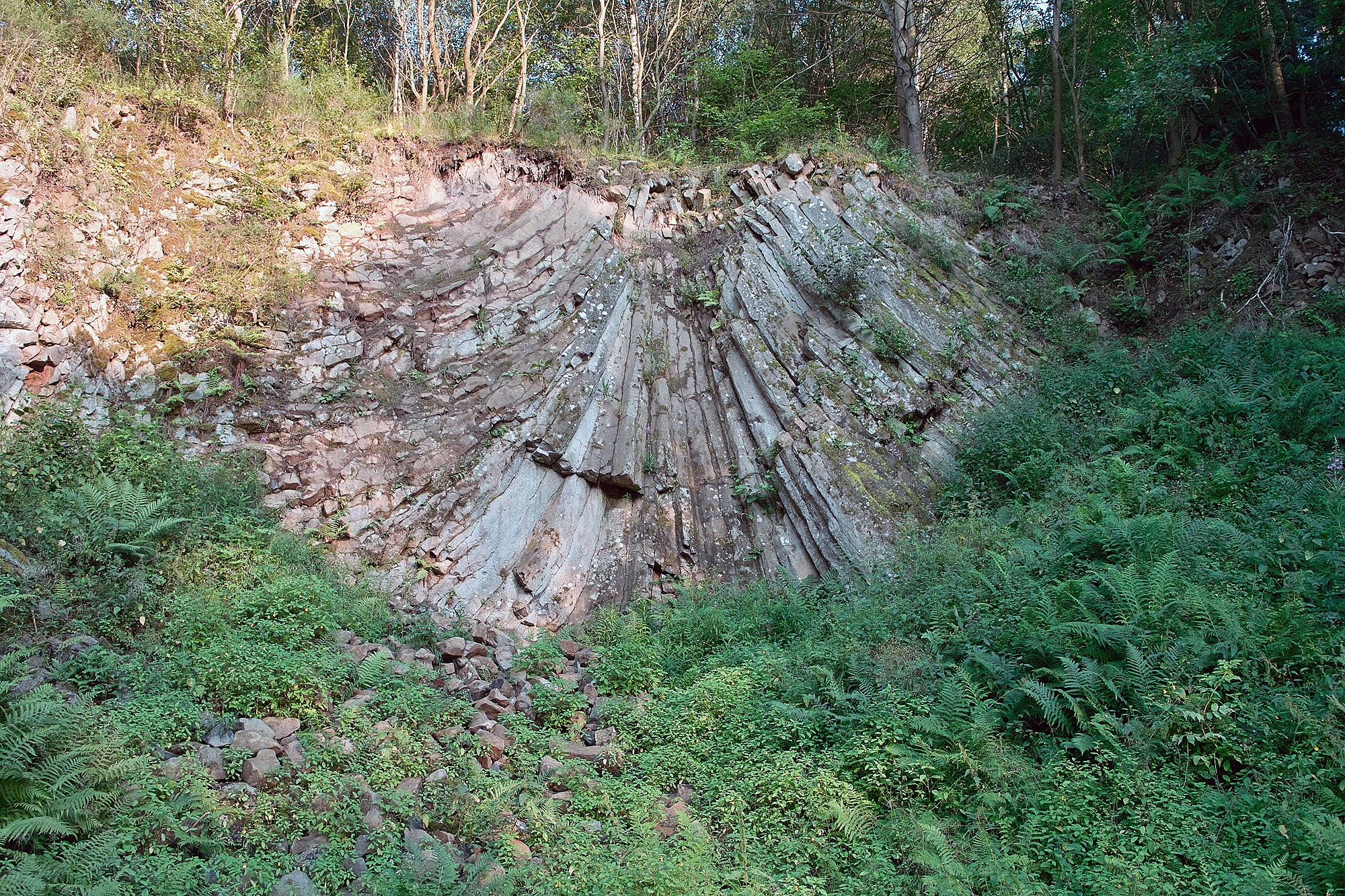
