= Stahlhofen =

- Municipality
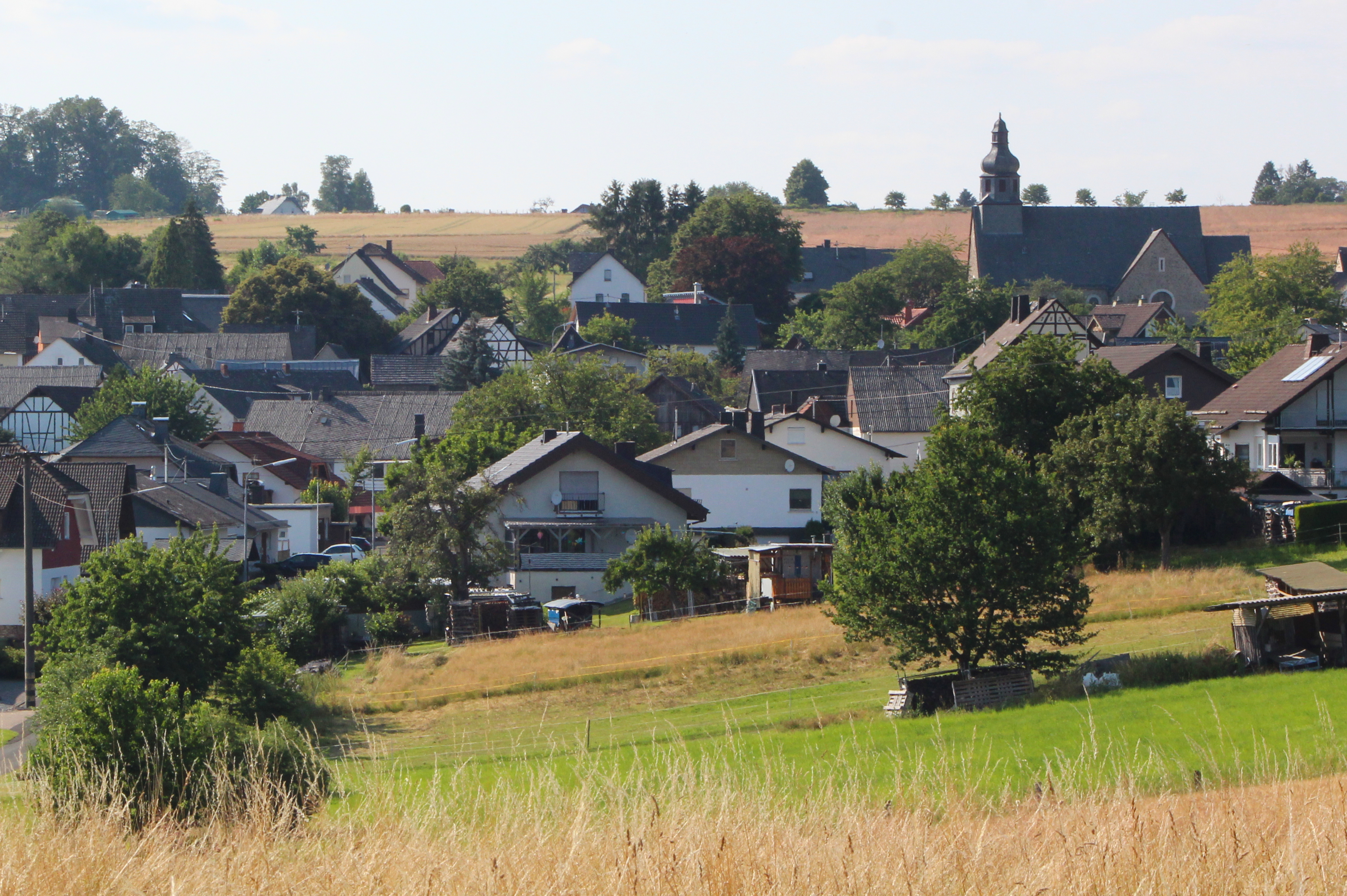

- Coat of arms

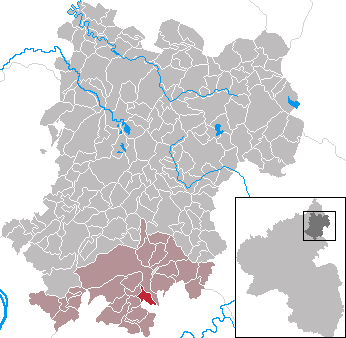
- Location of Stahlhofen within Westerwaldkreis district
- Interactive map of Stahlhofen
- Location within Germany Location within Rhineland-Palatinate
- Coordinates: 50°23′38″N 7°51′34″E
- Country: Germany
- State: Rhineland-Palatinate
- District: Westerwaldkreis
- Municipal assoc.: Montabaur

Government
  - Mayor (2019–24): Patrick George

Area
  - Total: 2.98 km^{2} (1.15 sq mi)
- Elevation: 300 m (980 ft)

Population (2025-12-31)
  - Total: 719
  - Density: 241/km^{2} (625/sq mi)
- Time zone: UTC+01:00 (CET)
  - Summer (DST): UTC+02:00 (CEST)
- Postal codes: 56412
- Dialling codes: 02602
- Vehicle registration: WW
- Website: www.stahlhofen-westerwald.de

Stahlhofen is an Ortsgemeinde – a community belonging to a Verbandsgemeinde – in the Westerwaldkreis in Rhineland-Palatinate, Germany. It is not to be confused with Stahlhofen am Wiesensee, another community in the same district, but in the Verbandsgemeinde of Westerburg.

== Geography ==
The community lies in the Westerwald south of Montabaur in the Nassau Nature Park. The community belongs to the Verbandsgemeinde of Montabaur, a kind of collective municipality. Its seat is in the like-named town.

== History ==
In 1387, Stahlhofen had its first documentary mention.

== Politics ==
=== Community council ===
The council is made up of 16 council members who were elected in a majority vote in a municipal election on 13 June 2004.

=== Coat of arms ===
The chapel in the community's arms symbolizes the age-old Wendelinuskapelle, which was replaced in the last century by the new building shown in the arms. The linden trees standing next to the chapel, which can be seen far into the surrounding countryside, are Stahlhofen's main landmark. The basalt columns stand for the rich basalt deposits the municipal area. The arms’ basic tincture, silver, and the chapel's tincture, red, are from the coat of arms formerly borne by the Electorate of Trier.

== Economy and infrastructure ==
Stahlhofen is connected to the local bus network and located in the area of the transport association Verkehrsverbund Rhein-Mosel (VRM), zone number 440. The nearest Autobahn interchange is Montabaur on the A 3 (Cologne–Frankfurt), some 6 km away. The nearest InterCityExpress stops are the railway stations at Montabaur on the Cologne-Frankfurt high-speed rail line and Koblenz on the Rechte Rheinstrecke.
