= Jaenicke =

Jaenicke is a surname. Notable people with the surname include:

- Anja Jaenicke (born 1963), German actress
- Frank Jaenicke (1892–1951), Co-operative Commonwealth Federation member of the Canadian House of Commons
- Hannes Jaenicke (born 1960), German actor
- Käte Jaenicke (1923-2002), German actress

== See also ==
- Jänicke (disambiguation)
