= Pottum =

- Municipality
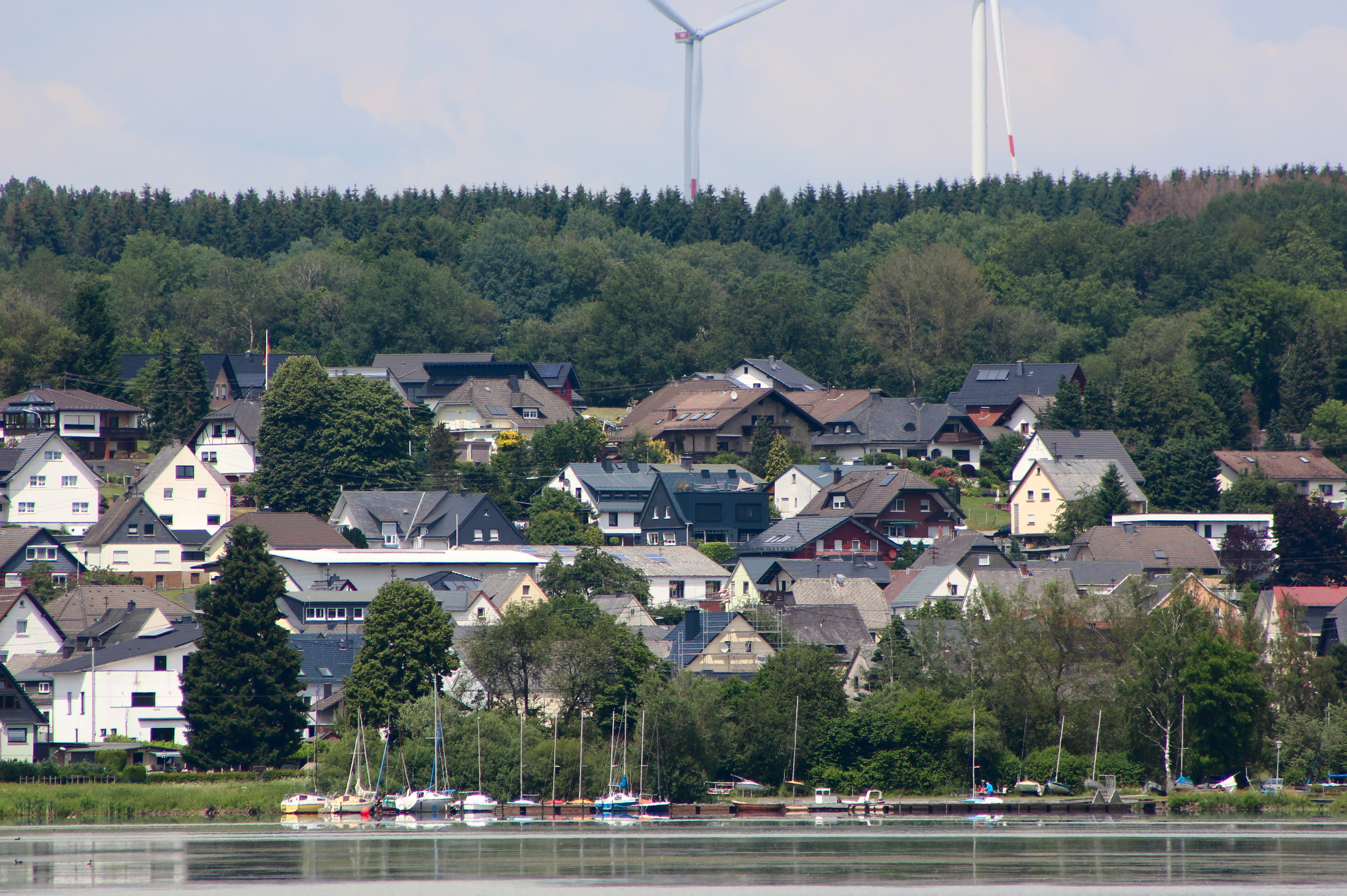

- Coat of arms

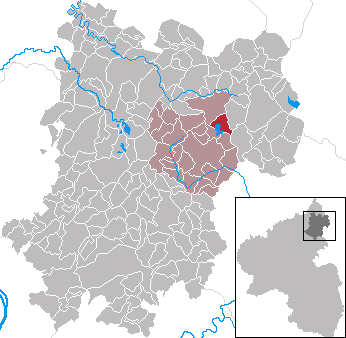
- Location of Pottum within Westerwaldkreis district
- Interactive map of Pottum
- Location within Germany Location within Rhineland-Palatinate
- Coordinates: 50°35′57″N 8°0′5″E
- Country: Germany
- State: Rhineland-Palatinate
- District: Westerwaldkreis
- Municipal assoc.: Westerburg

Government
  - Mayor (2019–24): Anette Leukel-Lenz

Area
  - Total: 4.36 km^{2} (1.68 sq mi)
- Elevation: 420 m (1,380 ft)

Population (2025-12-31)
  - Total: 1,076
  - Density: 247/km^{2} (639/sq mi)
- Time zone: UTC+01:00 (CET)
  - Summer (DST): UTC+02:00 (CEST)
- Postal codes: 56459
- Dialling codes: 02664
- Vehicle registration: WW
- Website: www.pottum.de

Pottum is an Ortsgemeinde – a community belonging to a Verbandsgemeinde – in the Westerwaldkreis in Rhineland-Palatinate, Germany.

== Geography ==
Pottum lies 5 km northeast of Westerburg on the Wiesensee (lake), near Stahlhofen am Wiesensee. Since 1972 it has belonged to what was then the newly founded Verbandsgemeinde of Westerburg, a kind of collective municipality. Its seat is in the like-named town.

== History ==
In 1062, Pottum, or Patheim, later Pothump, had its first documentary mention.

== Politics ==
The municipal council is made up of 17 council members, including the extraofficial mayor (Bürgermeister), who were elected in a majority vote in a municipal election on 13 June 2004.

== Well-known Pottumers ==
- Annegret Held (writer)
- Prof. Dr.- Ing. Helmut Hoyer (Rector of the Fernuniversität Hagen)
- Erich Müller (well known within the community due to his efforts in the local council and fire brigade)

== Transport ==
Pottum is served by local bus lines 477 (Rehe - Rennerod - Westerburg - Monatabaur) and 480 (Westerburg - Pottum - Hellenhahn - Rennerod - Driedorf - Krombachtalsperre) and located in the area of the transport association Verkehrsverbund Rhein-Mosel (VRM), zone number 440.
