= Stahlhofen am Wiesensee =

- Municipality
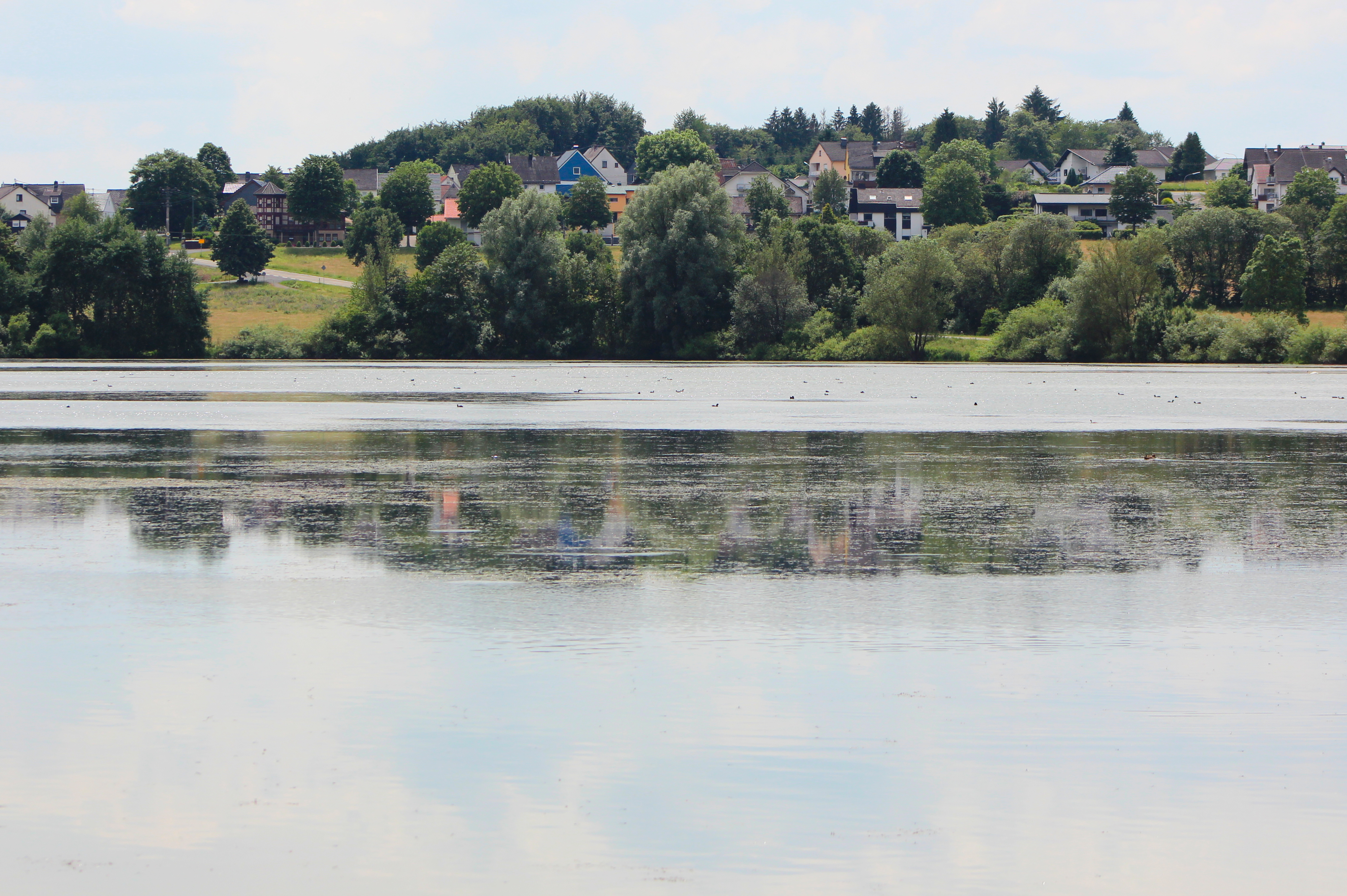

- Coat of arms

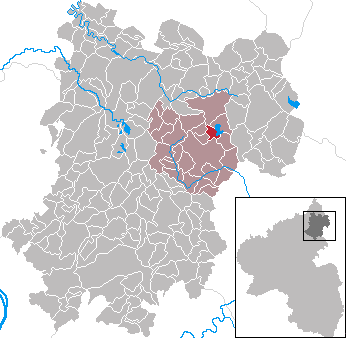
- Location of Stahlhofen am Wiesensee within Westerwaldkreis district
- Interactive map of Stahlhofen am Wiesensee
- Location within Germany Location within Rhineland-Palatinate
- Coordinates: 50°35′15″N 7°59′25″E
- Country: Germany
- State: Rhineland-Palatinate
- District: Westerwaldkreis
- Municipal assoc.: Westerburg

Government
  - Mayor (2019–24): Frank Butterweck

Area
  - Total: 2.42 km^{2} (0.93 sq mi)
- Elevation: 430 m (1,410 ft)

Population (2025-12-31)
  - Total: 383
  - Density: 158/km^{2} (410/sq mi)
- Time zone: UTC+01:00 (CET)
  - Summer (DST): UTC+02:00 (CEST)
- Postal codes: 56459
- Dialling codes: 02663
- Vehicle registration: WW
- Website: www.stahlhofen-am-wiesensee.de

Stahlhofen am Wiesensee is an Ortsgemeinde – a community belonging to a Verbandsgemeinde – in the Westerwaldkreis in Rhineland-Palatinate, Germany. It is not to be confused with Stahlhofen, another community in the same district, but in the Verbandsgemeinde of Montabaur.

== Geography ==
=== Location ===
Stahlhofen am Wiesensee lies 3 km northeast of Westerburg, on a bank near the Wiesensee's west shore. Since 1972 it has belonged to what was then the newly founded Verbandsgemeinde of Westerburg, a kind of collective municipality. Its seat is in the like-named town.

=== Neighbouring communities ===
Stahlhofen am Wiesensee's neighbours are Pottum, Hergenroth, Winnen and Halbs.

== Politics ==
The municipal council is made up of 9 council members, including the extraofficial mayor (Bürgermeister), who were elected in a majority vote in a municipal election on 13 June 2004.

== Culture and sightseeing ==
=== Buildings ===
The old village school from 1830 is a protected monument.

=== Sport ===
The Wiesensee (lake) has an area of roughly 80 ha and offers not only hikes around it but also bathing, sailing, surfing and angling. Near the lake is also found a golf course.

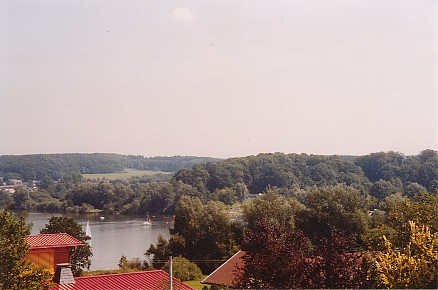
View of the lake in summer

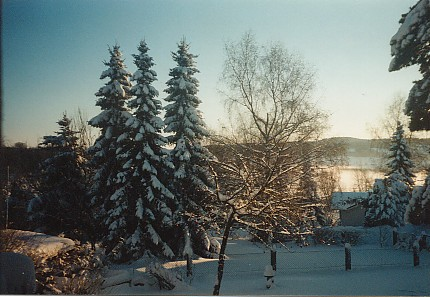
View of the lake in winter

== Economy and infrastructure ==
Stahlhofen is served by the local bus lines 477 (Rehe - Rennerod - Westerburg - Monatabaur) as well as 480 from Westerburg via Pottum and Rennerod to Driedorf and Krombachtalsperre. Stahlhofen is located on the area of the transport association Verkehrsverbund Rhein-Mosel (VRM), Tarifwabe (fare zone) number 440. North of the community runs Bundesstraße 255, linking Montabaur and Herborn. The nearest Autobahn interchange is Montabaur on the A 3 (Cologne–Frankfurt), some 20 km away. The nearest train station is Westerburg station on the Limburg–Altenkirchen railway. The nearest InterCityExpress stop is the railway station at Montabaur on the Cologne-Frankfurt high-speed rail line.
