= Gershasen =

Community in the City of Westerburg, Germany

Coordinates: 50°33′25″N 7°57′26″E

Gershasen is an Ortsgemeinde belonging to the city of Westerburg, Germany.

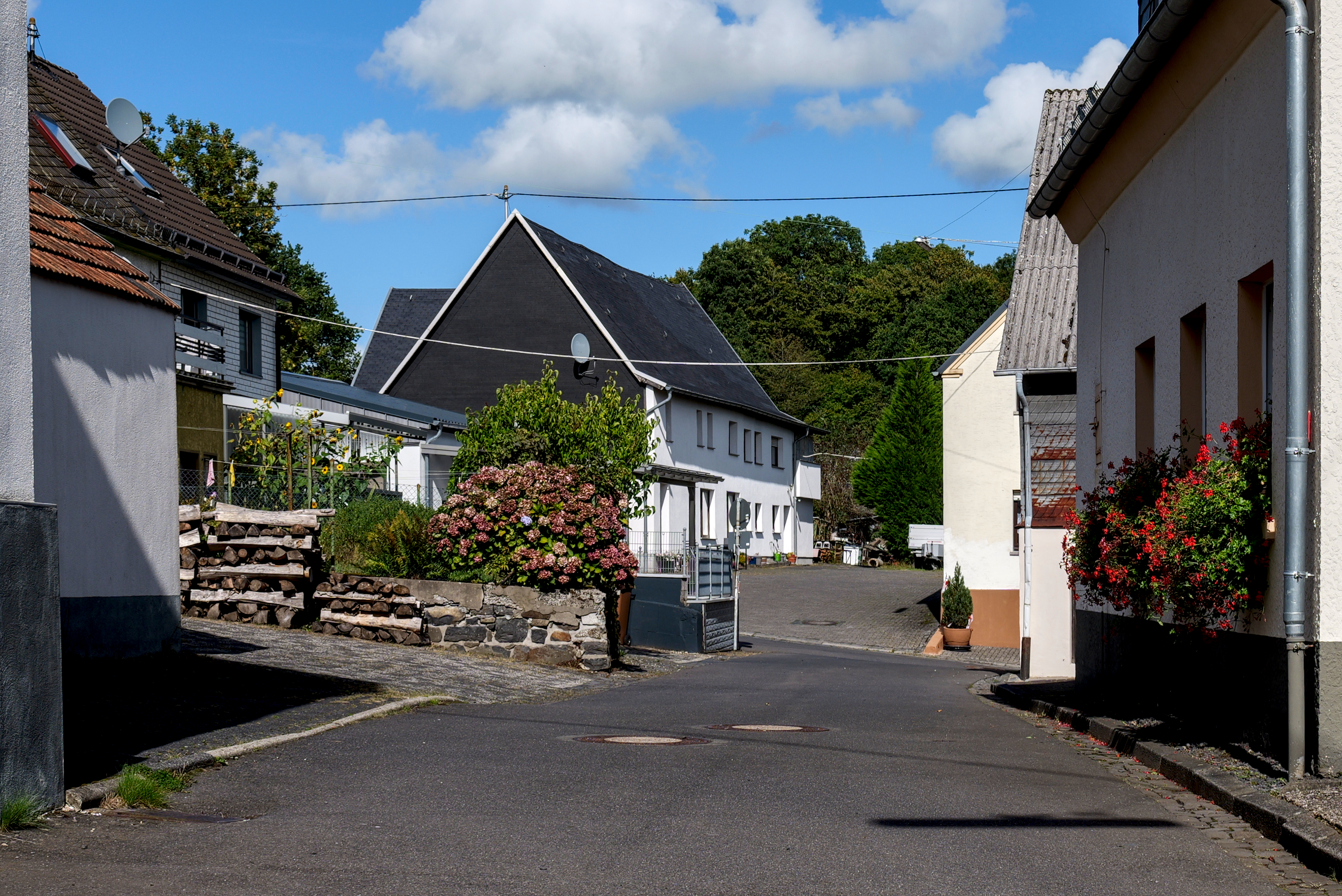
View of Gershasen

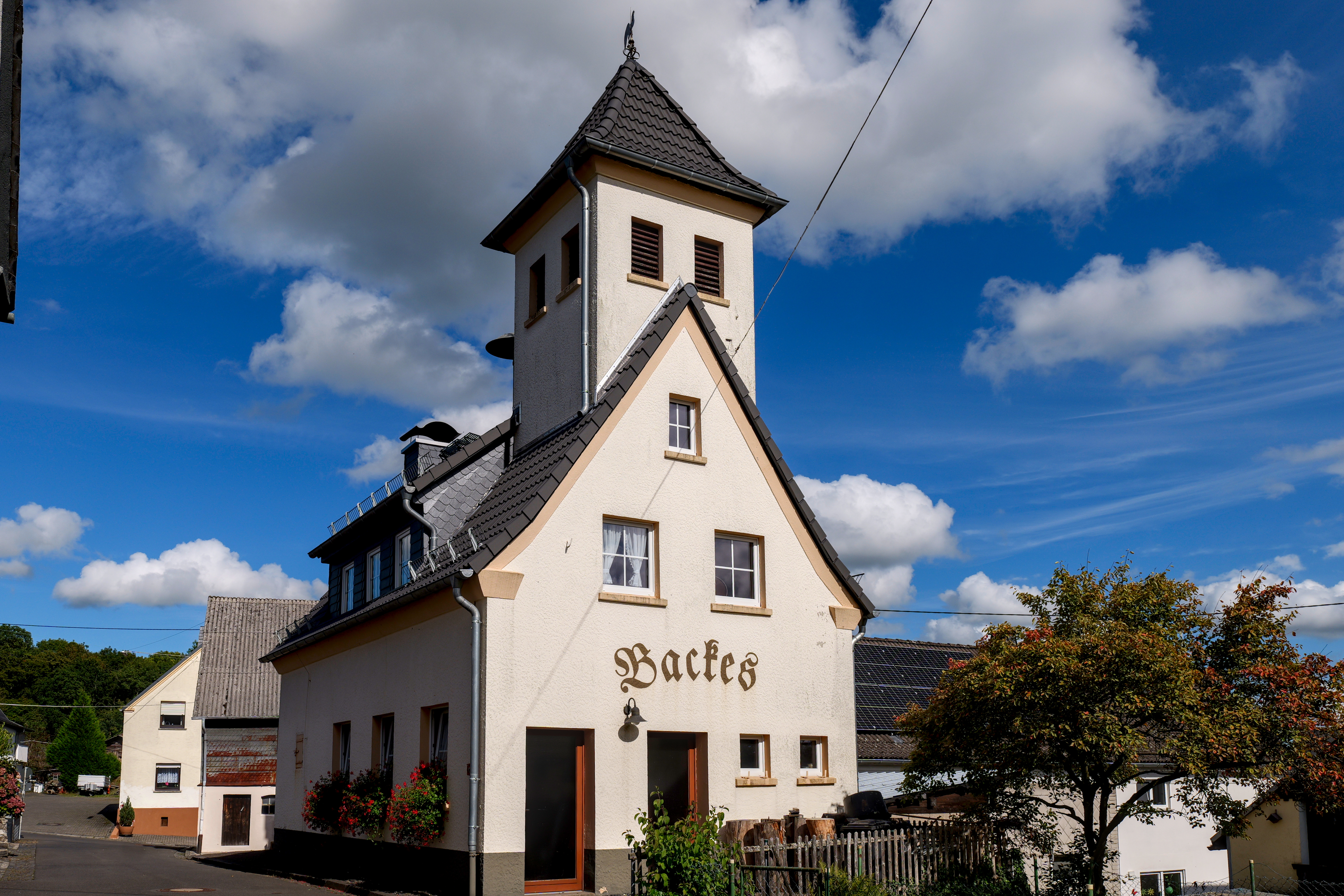
The bake house (Backes) in Gershasen

== Geography ==
=== Location ===
Gershasen lies on a hill and is one kilometer away from the Westerburg Station. Next to Gershasen are multiple forests.

=== Neighbouring communities ===
Gershasen borders Westerburg to the east, Kölbingen to the west. Sainscheid sits south of Gershasen.

== History ==
Gershasen was first mentioned in a division contract in 1270 with the name Gerssazen.

The name has been written in multiple ways, including Gerszohsen and Gerschasen. The form Gershasen was finalized in 1826.

When home ovens were banned, the need for workers to build ovens rose. One center was in Gershasen, which helped workers all across the Westerwald. In the 1880s, 35 oven builders existed among a population in Gershasen of about 250 people. When ovens became more popular in the first half of the 20th century, the numbers of oven builders declined. The last independent oven builder died in 1980.

Gershasen was annexed to Westerburg on 7 June 1969.

== Culture ==
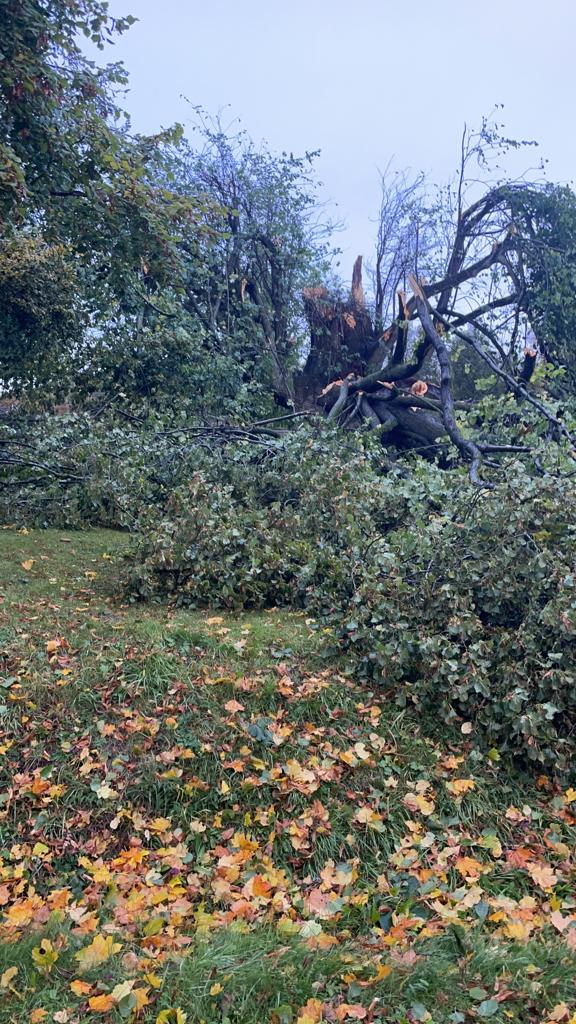
The linden of Gershasen when it fell in 2021 because of Storm Hendrik

Gershasen is known for its Backeshaus "Bakinghouse" and a Tilia (linden) near the graveyard of Gershasen, which existed for over 600 years until it fell in 2021 because of Storm Hendrik.

The village has a playground. It also has a volunteer fire brigade.

Saint Martin's Day is celebrated there. People start at the playground in Gershasen, then walk around the village, singing songs. One is on a horse portraying Saint Martin) until they return to the playground, where a fire is lit by the fire brigade and pretzels are sold at the firehouse.
