= Pierre Fischer =

German politician (born 1995)

Member of the Landtag of Rhineland-Palatinate
- In office 8 April 2025 – 31 December 2025
- Preceded by: Ellen Demuth
- Succeeded by: Janick Pape
- Constituency: Linz am Rhein/Rengsdorf

Personal details
- Born: 17 August 1995 (age 31)
- Party: Christian Democratic Union

Pierre Fischer (born 17 August 1995) is a German politician serving as mayor of Rengsdorf-Waldbreitbach since 2026. From April to December 2025, he was a member of the Landtag of Rhineland-Palatinate.
