= Wiesensee =

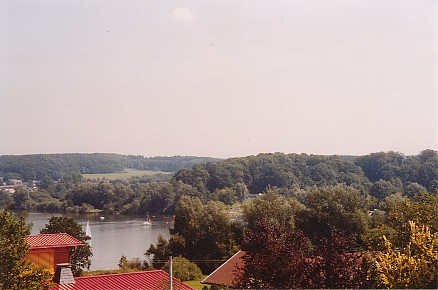

- Location within Rhineland-Palatinate
- Location: Westerwaldkreis, Rhineland-Palatinate
- Coordinates: 50°35′26″N 7°59′40″E
- Type: reservoir
- Basin countries: Germany
- Surface area: 80 ha (200 acres)
- Settlements: Stahlhofen am Wiesensee, Pottum

The Wiesensee (German pronunciation: [ˈviːzənzeː]) was an artificial lake, dammed up in 1971, in the Westerwald low mountain range. The lake covered about 80 hectares and lied in the area of Stahlhofen am Wiesensee's various centres on the lake's west shore, and Pottum on the north shore in the Westerwaldkreis. The community of Winnen borderd on the lake to the southeast. The lake was a nature conservation area, and only parts of the water surface were open for recreational use.

It was a holiday and tourist destination. Several hotels, a luxury hotel and golf course lied near the shore. Many leisure facilities in the winter and summer made the Wiesensee attractive for athletes, young families and youth. Around the lake ran a roughly 6.5-km-long hiking path loop.

Although the maximum dept was upto 6.5 meters on many places it was much less. From 2027, those places should be at least 2.5 meters deep, to avoid problems with mud again.

== Regular events ==
Once every year, usually in the third week of October, the lake was fished clean, and completely drained. On this occasion the fishing festival was traditionally held.

Every three years, the Vereinsring Pottum ("club ring") staged a Sommernachtfest ("Summer Night Festival") at the lake.

== Future ==
Since 2023, the Wiesensee is without water.

The lake is planned to be refilled from January 2027, first, about 190,000 m3 of mud have to be removed from the ground.

== Transport links ==
The local bus lines 477, 480 and N47 connect the Wiesensee with Westerburg and Rennerod.

== Other ==
In 2006, the Czech national football team stayed at Wiesensee during the world championship.
