= Janick Pape =

German politician (born 1988)

Member of the Landtag of Rhineland-Palatinate
- Incumbent
- Assumed office 31 December 2025
- Preceded by: Pierre Fischer
- Constituency: Bad Marienberg (Westerwald)/Westerburg (2026–present)

Personal details
- Born: 14 December 1988 (age 37)
- Party: Christian Democratic Union

Janick Pape (born 14 December 1988) is a German politician serving as a member of the Landtag of Rhineland-Palatinate since 2025. He has served as mayor of Westerburg since 2019.
