= Janick =

Janick is a given name and surname. Notable people with the name include:

== Given name ==
- Janick Gers (born 1957), English musician
- Janick Kamber (born 1992), Swiss footballer
- Janick Klausen (born 1993), Danish high jumper
- Janick Maceta (born 1994), Peruvian model and beauty pageant titleholder
- Janick Pape (born 1988), German politician

== Surname ==
- John Janick (born 1978), American music entrepreneur
