= 104.6 RTL =

Coordinates: 52.504482°N 13.335534°E

Berlin; Germany
- Broadcast area: Berlin, Brandenburg: FM, Livestream, DAB+

Programming
- Language: German
- Format: Hot adult contemporary

Ownership
- Owner: RTL Audio Center Berlin GmbH (RTL Group)

History
- First air date: 9 September 1991

Links
- Website: 104.6 RTL

104.6 RTL is a private radio station that is produced in a hot adult contemporary format. It is transmitted from studios in Kurfürstendamm in Berlin-Charlottenburg. According to German Media Analysis 2023/II, the station reaches 128,000 listeners in an average transmitting hour with a total of 217,000 listeners per day and thereby is one of the most listened to radio programs in Berlin and Brandenburg.

== Program ==
The most listened to program on 104.6 RTL is, as is the case for most radio stations worldwide, the morning show, which is known as “Arno and the Morning Crew”. The show has a relatively large talk portion, which has predominantly comedic content, in contrast to the rest of the station's programs. It has been moderated by Arno Müller since the beginning of the show, who is simultaneously the station's Director of Programming.

The rest of the daily programs are, as is usual for hot adult contemporary stations, contrasted with a music-heavy program, interrupted by short presentations, hourly news (which are always broadcast at ten minutes before the hour), service information, and advertisements.

== History ==
The station has been broadcasting since September 9, 1991. The model for 104.6 RTL was the radio station 102.7 KISS FM in Los Angeles, from which the method of construction of the radio studio has even been imitated, as well as numerous program elements.

Since 1997, 104.6 RTL has organized one of the largest free open-air festivals in the Kindl-Bühne Wuhlheide once per year with “Stars for Free”.

== Transmission area ==
The station covers Berlin and Brandenburg with its transmission.

=== Frequencies ===
- FM Berlin: 104.6
- FM Elsterwerda: 89.5
- FM Frankfurt/Oder: 98.0
- FM Finsterwalde: 88.0
- Analog cable Berlin: 104.05
- DAB+ Berlin: 12D

In January 2014, the DVB-T distribution was ended in Berlin.
