= Heike Leitte =

German computer scientist

Heike Leitte (originally Jänicke, born 1982) is a German computer scientist specializing in information visualization, scientific visualization, and visual analytics. She is a professor of computer science and chair of visual information analysis at the Technical University of Kaiserslautern.

== Education and career ==
Leitte was born in 1982 in Wittenberg, and earned a diplom (the German equivalent of a master's degree) in 2006 at Leipzig University. She completed a doctorate (Dr. rer. nat.) there in 2009, with the dissertation Information Theoretic Methods for the Visual Analysis of Climate and Flow Data supervised by Gerik Scheuermann.

She was a junior professor for visualization at Heidelberg University from 2010 to 2015, when she took her present position at the Technical University of Kaiserslautern.
