= 104.6 RTL Morgencrew =

German radio program

Die Morgencrew
Name	Function
Jan Lohan	Main Presenter
Verena Runne	Co-Host
Daniel Weberling	Producer and Sidekick
Benjamin Herrmann	"104.6 RTL Aktuell"
"Commander" Frank Hellberg	Traffic pilot
Jens Kipke	Comedy writer
Andreas Kramer	Comedy writer
Mareike Melde	Line Producer
Daniel Spiecker	Editor

104.6 RTL Morgencrew is the morning show of the Berlin radio station 104.6 RTL. It broadcasts weekdays from 5:00 – 10:00 in the morning. Each Saturday on both stations, a summary of the week follows in a “best-of” show from 8:00 – 10:00 in the morning. The host of the show is Arno Müller, who is also the director of programming of 104.6 RTL. His co-host had been Katja Desens since 1995, until her retirement on June 22, 2023. Since then, Julia Porath, who had been her deputy since 2019, has been the permanent co-presenter.

== History ==
Arno und die Morgencrew is a morning show in the same vein as American morning radio shows, with a lot of comedy and multiple hosts, sidekicks, traffic pilots, sweepstakes, listener participation, as well as promotions, like “Smash Your Bathroom” or “Ex or Marriage”.

Within nine months, the show became the leader in listeners in the Berlin market according to the German Media-Analyse, and pointed the way for the German radio scene. Arno und die Morgencrew is one of the most copied shows in Germany.

Once a year, Arno und die Morgencrew broadcasts from Majorca. Other overseas broadcasts were made from Los Angeles, Hong Kong, Greece, Dubai, Turkey, and Thailand.

== Comedies and categories ==
- Burhan Yilmaz (Crazy phone)
- Der kleine Nils (English: Little Nils) (Crazy phone)
- Opa Kurt (English: Grandpa Kurt) (Crazy phone)
- Jürgen Kerbel (Crazy phone)
- Marie aus Paris (English: Marie from Paris) (Crazy phone)
- Phillip von Senftleben – the world champion of flirting
- Supermerkel
- Daily Wowi
- Unrequested demand
- Agathe Bauer Songs
- 365 things that you must have done in Berlin and Brandenburg before you die
- Crew vs. You
- The Morning Crew on hold
- Christmas wishes
- Battle of the Sexes
- From 0 to 100
- Loyalty test
- Bavaria wakes up

== Awards ==
- 1993/1994 Research Group Samurai Award on the NAB in Los Angeles, Arno Müller
- 1993 Bild Newspaper “Radio Man of the Year”, Arno Müller
- 2005 German Radio Award, Best Morning Show
- 2008 Radio Award, Agathe Bauer Songs
- 2008 Radio Award, Ausbildung für alle (English:Education for All)
- 2011 Golden Lion, 20 Years at RTL, Arno Müller
- 2012 German Radio Award, Life’s Work in Hosting, Arno Müller
- 2014 German Radio Award, Best Morning Show
- 2017 German Radio Award, Best Morning Show
