= Westerburg =

- Town
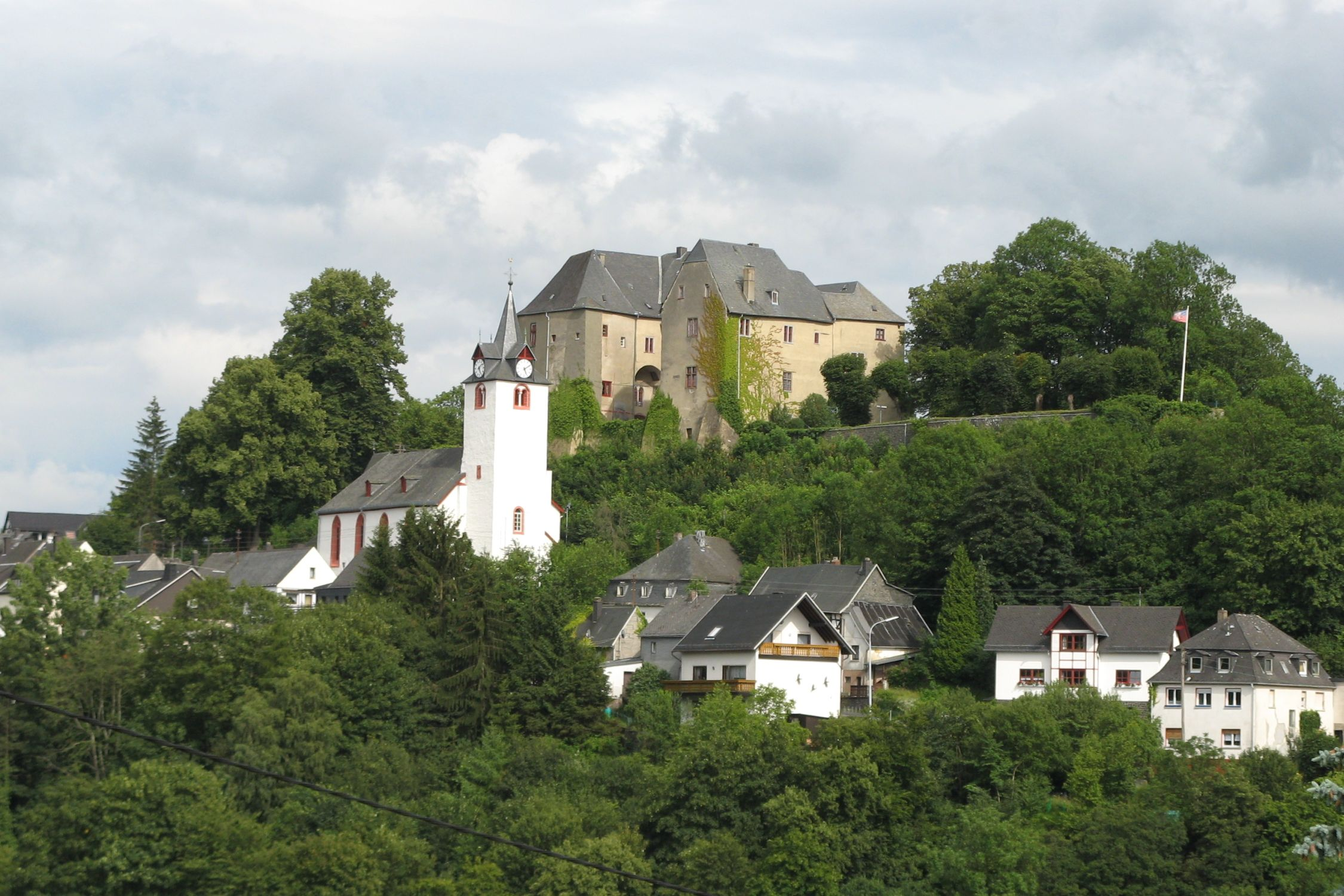
- Westerburg Schlossberg the castle and the Evangelical castle church

- Coat of arms

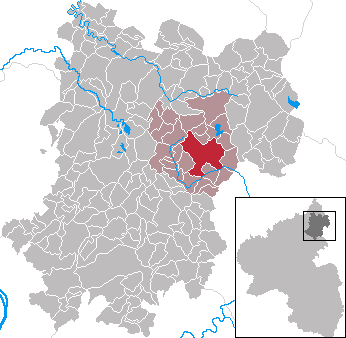
- Location of Westerburg within Westerwaldkreis district
- Interactive map of Westerburg
- Location within Germany Location within Rhineland-Palatinate
- Coordinates: 50°33′50″N 7°58′21″E
- Country: Germany
- State: Rhineland-Palatinate
- District: Westerwaldkreis
- Municipal assoc.: Westerburg
- Subdivisions: 3

Government
  - Mayor (2019–24): Janick Pape (CDU)

Area
  - Total: 18.48 km^{2} (7.14 sq mi)
- Elevation: 343 m (1,125 ft)

Population (2025-12-31)
  - Total: 6,041
  - Density: 326.9/km^{2} (846.7/sq mi)
- Time zone: UTC+01:00 (CET)
  - Summer (DST): UTC+02:00 (CEST)
- Postal codes: 56457
- Dialling codes: 02663
- Vehicle registration: WW
- Website: www.stadt-westerburg.de

Westerburg (German pronunciation: [ˈvɛstɐˌbʊʁk]) is a small town of roughly 6,000 inhabitants in the Westerwaldkreis in Rhineland-Palatinate, Germany. The town is named after the castle built on a hill above the medieval town centre (Burg is German for “castle”)

== Geography ==
=== Location ===
The town lies in easternmost Rhineland-Palatinate, 4 km from the boundary with Hesse. It is the seat of the Verbandsgemeinde of Westerburg – a kind of collective municipality – which administers the town and 24 surrounding municipalities.

=== Constituent communities ===
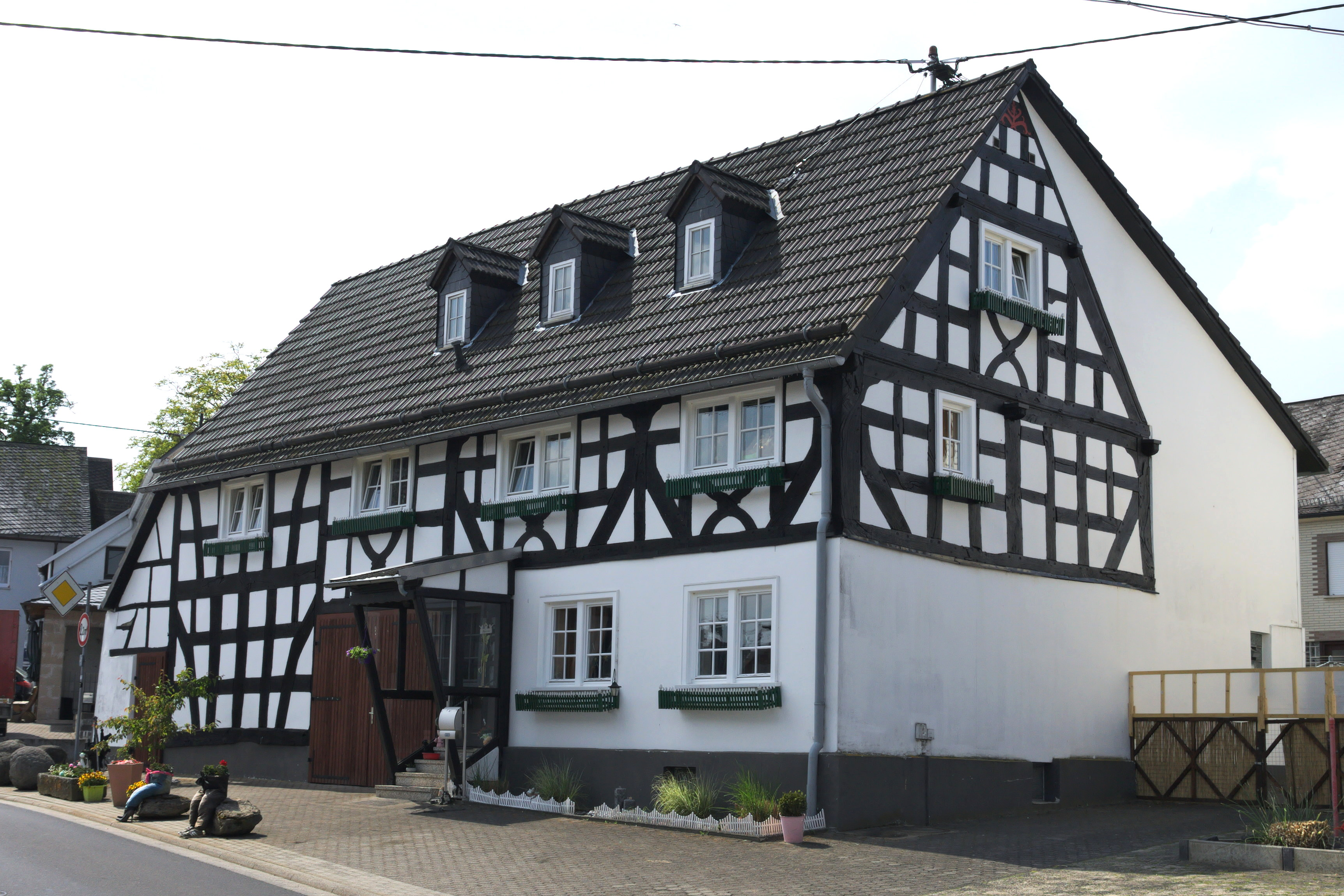
Main road in district Sainscheidt

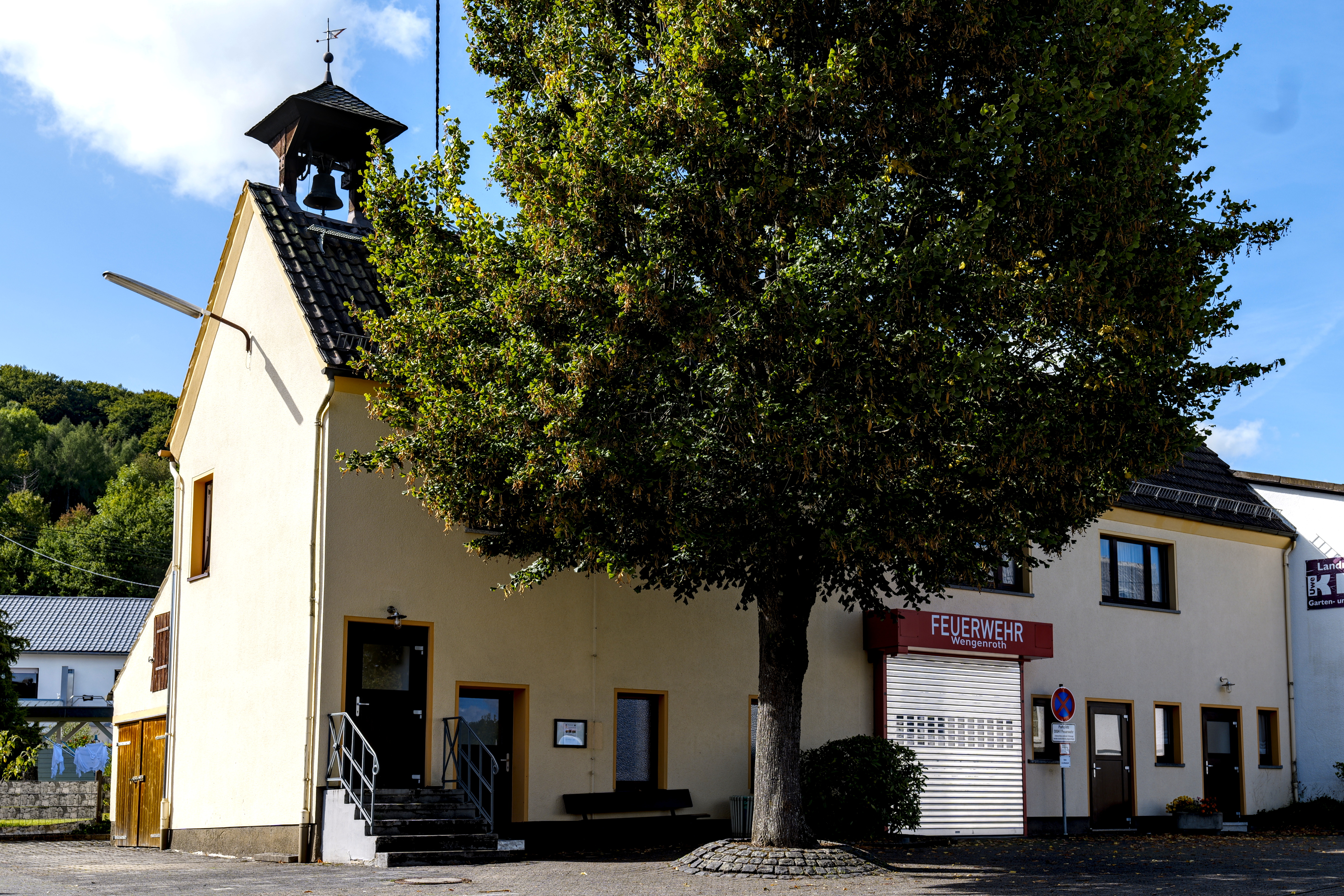
Backhaus in district Wengenroth

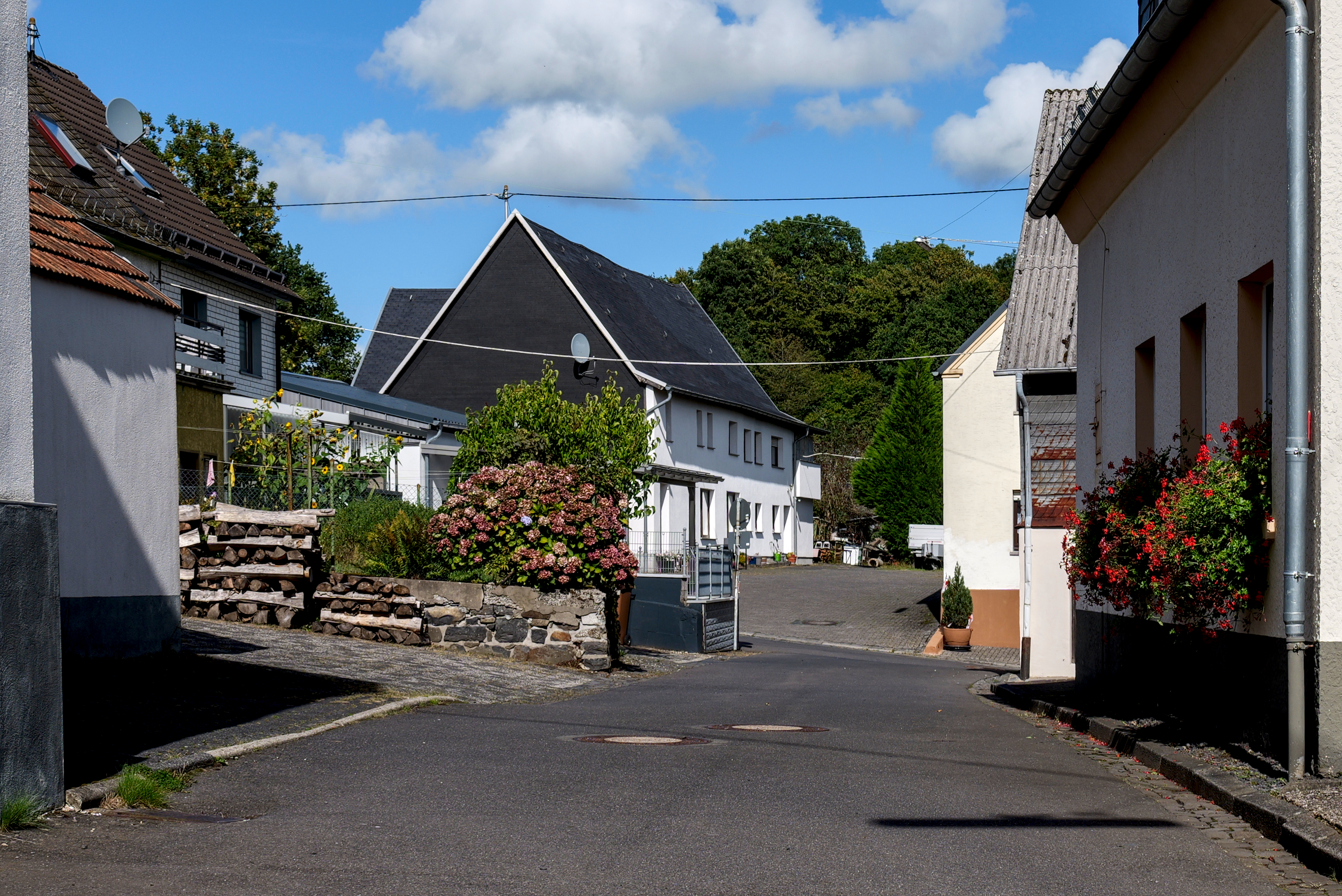
View of Gershasen

The former Ortsgemeinden – communities belonging to a Verbandsgemeinde – of Gershasen, Wengenroth and Sainscheid belong to the town of Westerburg.

== History ==
The earliest witnesses to human beings settling in what is now Westerburg are some urns that point to cremations performed here about 700 BC.

The earliest documentary mention of the constituent community of Wengenroth is dated 9 November 879 from the time when Gebhard, Count of the Lahngau donated holdings here to the St. Severus Monastery in Gemünden.

The first time that Westerburg was named in a document came in 1209 when Siegfried III of Runkel acquired Westerburg by marrying a countess from the House of Leiningen and thereafter began calling himself Siegfried von Runkel und von Westerburg. Two of his sons had bequests from him: Siegfried IV of Runkel, whose seat was in Westerburg, and Dietrich I of Runkel, whose seat was in Runkel. Family squabbles began about 1250 and under Siegfried's grandsons led to a permanent rift between the houses of Westerburg and Runkel by 1288. Dietrich's son Siegfried V of Runkel drove his cousin Heinrich out of Runkel, whereupon Siegfried, who was Siegfried IV's son, began calling himself Heinrich I of Westerburg. There are express indications of settlement next to the castle for the first time in 1270.

On 7 July 1292, Westerburg was raised to town at the same time as Wetzlar by King Adolf of Nassau, who also granted both towns the same town rights. In 1303, a jurymen's court (Schöffengericht) was approved in the town. Later these jurymen, whose number soon became fixed at eight, took turns serving as the town's mayor. No later than 1304, there were individual fortification works. Later, the town was divided into the upper town (Oberflecken) within the ring of walls finished by 1400 and the unwalled lower town (Unterflecken). There are known to have been 20 Burgmann houses in the upper town, but only from documents; archaeology has yielded no confirmation. In 1514, the first townsman's house (Bürgerhaus) is mentioned, and in 1560, a new building. In 1630, a prison is avouched.

In 1448 and 1534, great fires beset the town. After the unification of the County of Leiningen-Dagsburg with the Barony of Westerburg in 1467, Reinhard IV of Westerburg, who as of 1481 began calling himself Count Reinhard I at Leiningen-Westerburg, moved his seat to the County of Leiningen. Only as of 1557 was Westerburg once again a seat for sidelines of the once more sundering House of Leiningen or its family branch, Leiningen-Westerburg. Westerburg townsmen (Bürger) had at their disposal several privileges, in particular blood court jurisdiction (Halsgerichtsbarkeit) at their jurymen's court. Moreover, taxation privileges and laying out economic estates about the town time and again put the townsmen at loggerheads with the lords of the day.

In 1806, Westerburg passed to the Duchy of Berg. After 1815, the town was assigned to the Duchy of Nassau. On 2 September 1814, the lower town burnt down, and likewise the upper town on 13 October 1819. As of 1866, Prussia held sway. From 1866 to 1885, Westerburg belonged to the Amt of Rennerod and thereby also to the newly formed district of Oberwesterwaldkreis, whose seat was in Bad Marienberg. District reform in 1885 brought Westerburg a broader administrative function once again as it became the seat of a like-named district, which was in force until 1932. In that year, the Oberwesterwaldkreis was newly founded and Westerburg became its seat. In 1974, however, the two districts of Oberwesterwaldkreis and Unterwesterwaldkreis were amalgamated, and since then, Westerburg has no longer been a district seat.

Ecclesiastically, Westerburg was assigned to the St. Severus Monastery at Gemünden. The Late Romanesque tower of what is now an Evangelical church might stem from the first church building next to the castle chapel. A further chapel stood in the lower town by 1350. It is believed that shortly after 1560, the Reformation was introduced into Westerburg. Jews are first mentioned in 1616. In 1760, the Jewish community comprised 75 persons with one rabbi, and by 1754, there was a Jewish school. Public schooling is first known to have been instituted in 1557. Later, the school was also run temporarily as a Latin school.

The oldest census, from 1540, shows 124 assessable inhabitants. Eighty-six households are witnessed in 1607, and 39 in 1656. In 1760, 1,144 inhabitants were counted, and in 1807, 1,245.

Most inhabitants of course worked at agriculture or market gardening in the Middle Ages and on into early modern times, but they were hardly townsman farmers (Ackerbürger). Westerburg seems much more to have been a craft centre for the surrounding region in which even such rare crafts as arrowsmithing and crossbow making were settled. Also showing this are the many traders’ markets held in the town. Several guilds formed in this comparatively small town: in 1581 the bakers’ guild, which joined with the brewers’ guild in 1657, in 1532 the woolweavers’ and clothmakers’ guild (dissolved in 1710), in 1574 the tanners’ and shoemakers’ guild, in 1611 the linen weavers’ guild, and by 1658 also the tailors’ and merchants’. The woolweavers are known to have had their own hall, "Westerburger Hall" in Frankfurt am Main in 1605. Furthermore, it has been established that there were several mills, a forest smithy, a limekiln (mentioned in 1537) and a brickworks (built in 1612).

By 1518 there was also a sickhouse, and the town had an apothecary by 1697.

== Politics ==
=== Community council ===
The municipal council in Westerburg consists of 22 council members, as well as the honorary and presiding mayor (Stadtbürgermeister), who were elected at the municipal elections on 25 May 2014.

The distribution of seats in the council is as follows:

Wahl	SPD	CDU	FWG	WuB	Total
2014	4	9	2	7	22 seats
2009	4	11	2	5	22 seats
2004	4	9	2	7	22 seats

- FWG = Freie Wähler Gruppe Stadt Westerburg e. V.
- WuB = Wir unabhängigen Bürger Westerburger Land e. V.

=== Mayor ===
Since 2019, Janick Pape (CDU) has been the town's mayor.

=== Town partnerships ===
Westerburg has partnership arrangements with the following places:

- Daventry, Northamptonshire, England, United Kingdom
- Le Cateau-Cambrésis, Nord, France
- Nowa Wieś Wielka, Kuyavian-Pomeranian Voivodeship, Poland
- Złotoryja, Lower Silesian Voivodeship, Poland

== Economy and infrastructure ==
The Westerburg countryside has at its disposal, by reason of its lying between the urban agglomerations of Rhine-Main and Cologne-Düsseldorf-Ruhr, great appeal (according to a self-description at its website)

To ensure it, the municipality and the chamber of commerce (Verein für Handel, Handwerk, Industrie und Gewerbe e.V.) undertook in early 2005 to work on professional local marketing for Westerburg and the Westerburger Land (the outlying countryside), in which all fields of economic and political endeavour in the town and the area took part.

=== Transport ===
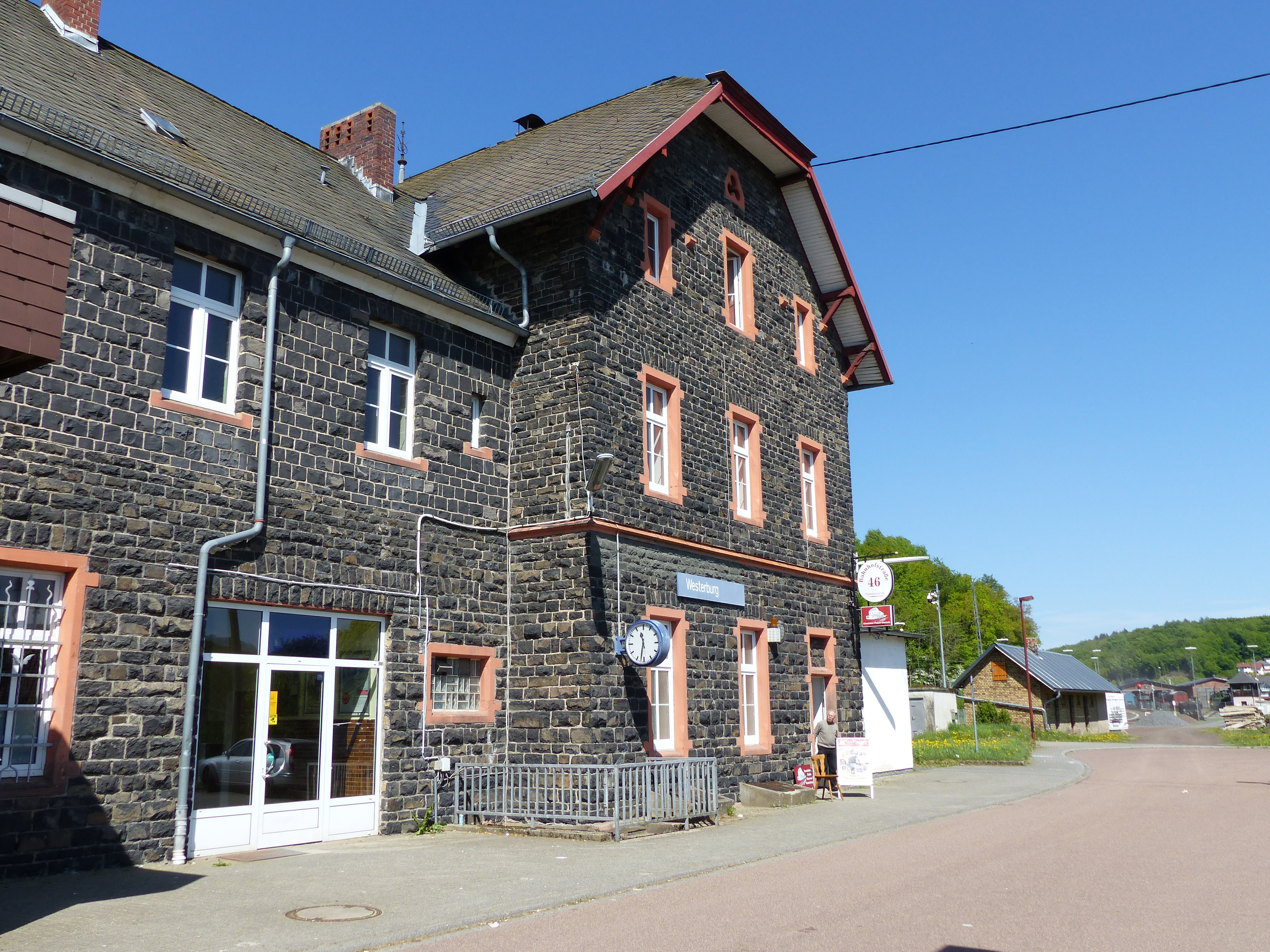
Westerburg train station

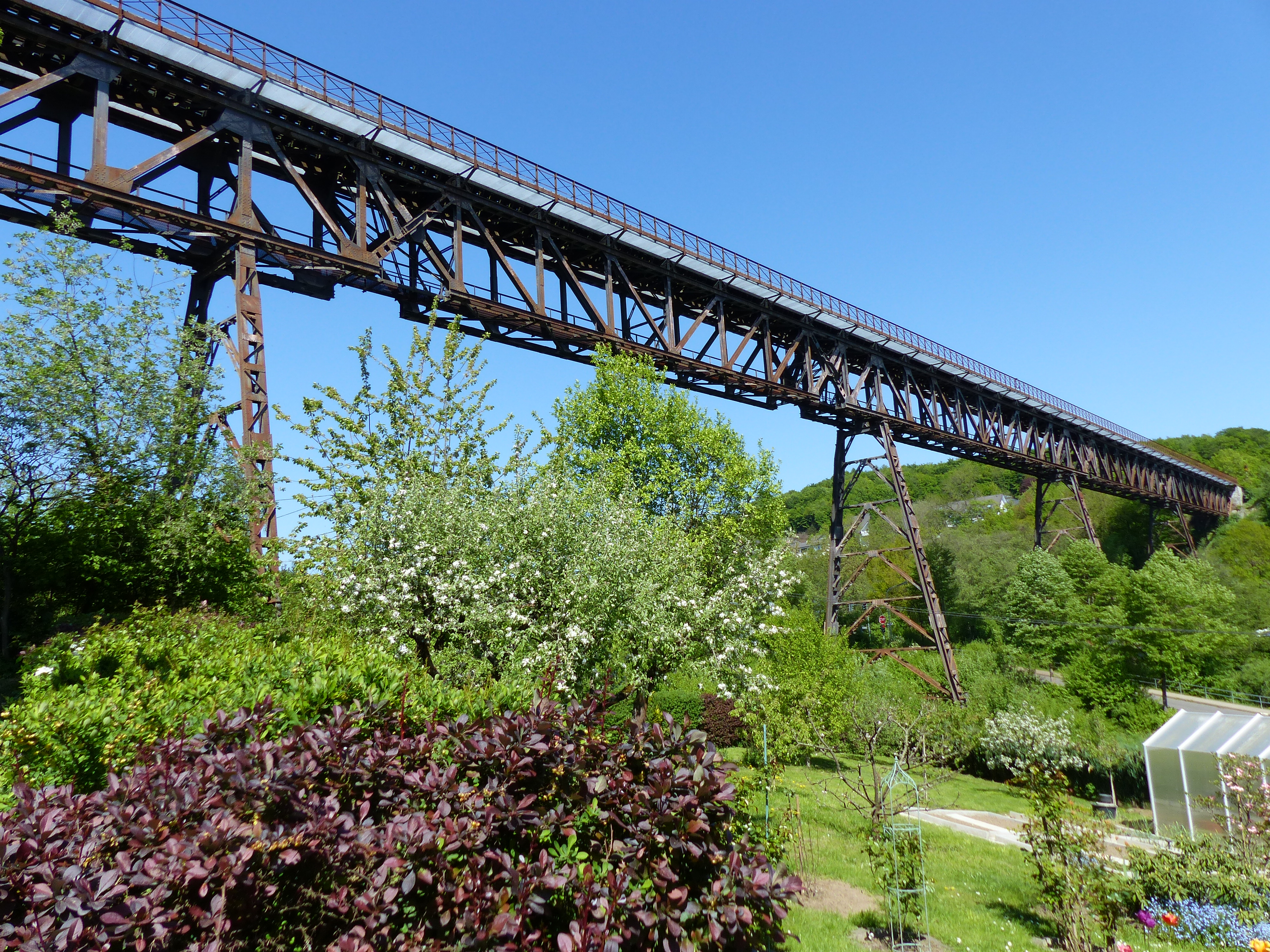
Hülsbachtal-bridge

Westerburg station lies on the line RB90 Westerwald-Sieg-Bahn (Limburg (Lahn) - Diez Ost - Staffel - Westerburg - Nistertal-Bad Marienberg - Hachenburg - Altenkirchen - Au (Sieg) - Wissen - Betzdorf - Kirchen - Siegen Hbf) through Hessische Landesbahn, section DreiLänderBahn, from Au (Sieg), Limburg and Siegen, the cities of Cologne, Koblenz, Frankfurt am Main and Wiesbaden may be reached directly.

This line RB90 passes Westerburg's district Wengenroth, although there is no train stop yet.

Westerburg train station has a Bike and ride facility and a Park and ride lot as well.

Also the former Cross Westerwald railway (Montabaur - Wallmerod - Westerburg - Rennerod - Herborn) lied Westerburg station as well as the former stop in the district Sainscheid. But nowadays this line is only in service between Montabaur and Wallmerod for fright trains and from Fehl-Ritzhausen to Rennerod station touristic railbike tours take place, organized by the interest group IG Westerwald-Querbahn e. V. (IWQ).

The local bus lines 460, 470, 480, 481, 483, 484, 965, N46, N47 and N48 connect Westerburg to the public bus transport.

Westerburg is located in the transport association Verkehrsverbund Rhein-Mosel (VRM), tarifwabe (fare zone) 431.

Westerburg is located on Westerwaldsteig, a long distance walking path from Herborn via Rennerod, Westerburg, Bad Marienberg and Hachenburg to Bad Hönningen.

The Hülsbachtal-bridge is a bridge that has been used from the trains of the Westerwald-Querbahn (Cross Westerwald railway) and also includes a pedestrian- and cycle path, it is a listed building, nowadays it is out of train service and also the pedestrian- and cycle path is closed.

Nearest accessabilities to the long distance train service are Montabaur station and Limburg Süd station at the Cologne-Frankfurt high-speed rail line.

Autobahnen A 3 (Cologne–Frankfurt), A 45 (Dortmund–Gießen) and A 48 (Montabaur–Trier) each lie roughly 20 km away.

Near Westerburg lies Ailertchen airport (ICAO code: EDGA).

=== Education ===
Westerburg is a schooling centre with every kind of school. The following educational institutions are to be found here:

- Konrad-Adenauer-Gymnasium
- Realschule Plus am Schlossberg
- Rolf-Simon-Schaumburger-Hauptschule
- Regenbogenschule (“Rainbow School”, primary school)
- Berufsbildende Schule Westerburg (vocational training school) with associated economic Gymnasium
- Friedrich-Schweizer-Schule (special school for students with learning disabilities)
- Adolf-Reichwein-Studienseminar for teaching office at primary schools and Hauptschulen
- Volkshochschule Westerburg (folk high school)
- Montessori-School Westerwald (A Primary school and Realschule combined, with the Montessori method, named after Maria Montesorri)

=== Sport ===
Among sporting venues are the Westerwaldstadion and the Schulsportstadion (stadiums), competitive track type B with grass playing field, plastic running track and further competition-ready facilities for athletics. In the runup to the 2006 FIFA World Cup, this was the training facility used by the Czech Republic national football team, who stayed in a sport hotel at the Wiesensee (lake) in the Verbandsgemeinde of Westerburg.

Furthermore, Westerburg has a heated swimming pool at its disposal with a sunbathing field. This is run by a private club and is open in the summer months, from about May to September.

=== Energy production ===
Since 2014, a small wind farm is producing electricity in the area called "Roter Kopf" (red head).

== Culture and sightseeing ==
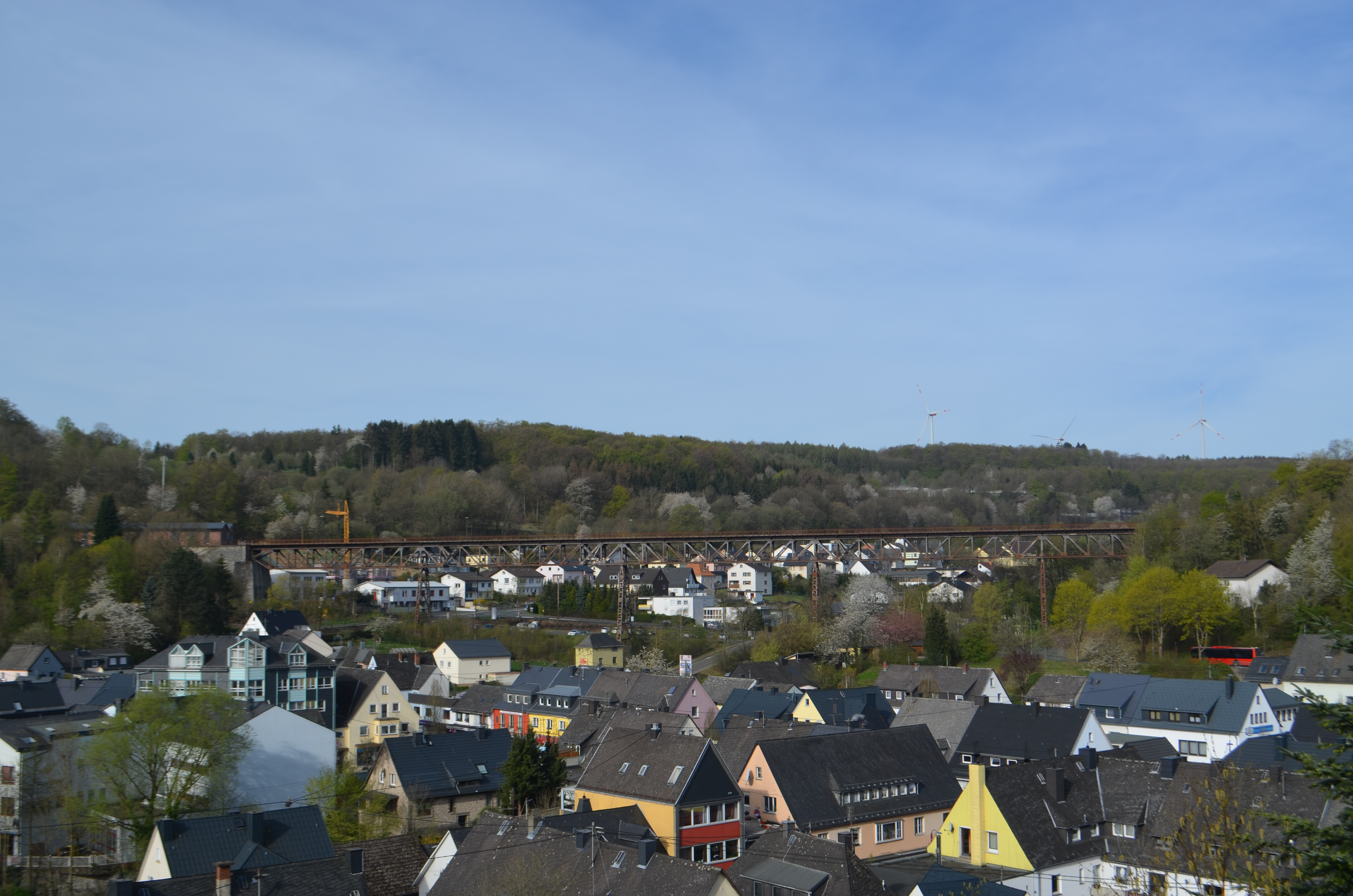
View on Westerburg

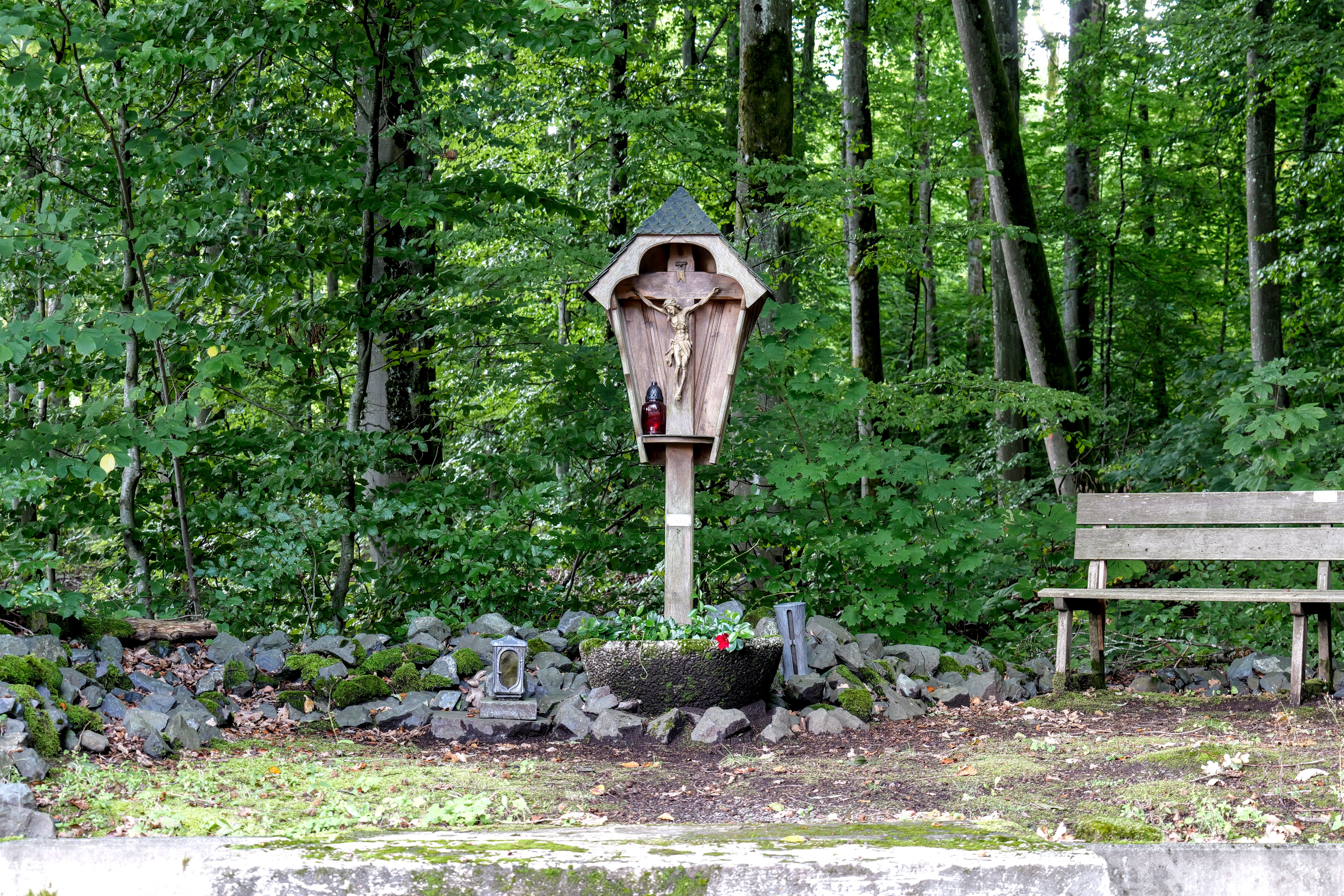
Hilsberg cross

=== Buildings ===
The castle, Schloss Westerburg, was first mentioned in 1192, and together with the castle church from the 16th century it is the town's landmark.
