= Eisbachtaler Sportfreunde =

Association football club

- Full name: Eisbachtaler Sportfreunde 1919
- Nickname: Eisbären (Polar Bears)
- Founded: 1919/1966
- Ground: Eisbachtalstadion
- Capacity: 6,000
- League: Oberliga Rheinland-Pfalz/Saar (V)
- 2025–26: Oberliga Rheinland-Pfalz/Saar, 14th of 18
Home colours	Away colours

Eisbachtaler Sportfreunde is a German association football club based in Nentershausen, Rhineland-Palatinate.

== History ==
Eisbachtaler Sportfreunde were formed in 1966 as a merger of local teams SC Großholbach, TuS Girod-Kleinholbach, VfR Nomborn, TuS Heilberscheid and TuS Nentershausen. The oldest of these clubs was founded in 1919, which is recognized as the official founding year. Eisbachtal immediately began their rise through the league system and eventually reached the Regionalliga Südwest in 1972, then the second-highest tier in German football. Due to the introduction of the 2. Bundesliga in 1974, the club was relegated to the Amateurklasse. In 1978, Sportfreunde were founding members of the newly introduced Oberliga Südwest, and stayed in this league until their relegation in 1986. The next years were spent in the Verbandsliga Rheinland, before they eventually returned to the Oberliga in 1990. Eisbachtal established themselves as one of the better teams for the next decade, missing out on promotion to the Regionalliga West/Südwest several times. At the beginning of the new millennium, the strength of the club gradually decreased and eventually culminated in relegation to the fifth-tier Verbandsliga Rheinland in 2003.

After four years in the Verbandsliga Rheinland, which had been renamed Rheinlandliga in the meantime, Eisbachtal surprisingly dropped yet another level to the Bezirksliga in 2007. They made their immediate return to the Rheinlandliga in 2008 after winning a four team relegation round before achieving promotion to the Oberliga Südwest at the end of the 2008–09 season.

After two Oberliga seasons the club dropped to the Rheinlandliga once more, where it played for an additional eight until 2019, when Eisbachtal won the league and earned another promotion to the renamed Oberliga Rhineland-Pfalz/Saar where the club plays today.

== Honours ==
The club's honours:

- Oberliga Südwest/Rhineland-Pfalz/Saar
  - Runners-up: 1995, 1998, 2022
- Rheinlandliga
  - Champions: 1972, 1990, 2009, 2019

== Stadium ==
Sportfreunde Eisbachtal currently play in the Eisbachtalstadion, which has a capacity of 6,000.

The stadium is in use since 1972. Before that, the club played in the Waldstadion Großholbach, the ground of co-founders SC Großholbach.

== Recent seasons ==
The recent season-by-season performance of the club:

Season	Division	Tier	Position
2001–02	Oberliga Südwest	IV	6th
2002–03	Oberliga Südwest	IV	19th ↓
2003–04	Rheinlandliga	V	8th
2004–05	Rheinlandliga	V	11th
2005–06	Rheinlandliga	V	8th
2006–07	Rheinlandliga	V	15th ↓
2007–08	Bezirksliga Rheinland-Ost	VI	2nd ↑
2008–09	Rheinlandliga	VI	1st ↑
2009–10	Oberliga Südwest	V	7th
2010–11	Oberliga Südwest	V	19th ↓
2011–12	Rheinlandliga	VI	2nd
2012–13	Rheinlandliga	VI	8th
2013–14	Rheinlandliga	VI	8th
2014–15	Rheinlandliga	VI	4th
2015–16	Rheinlandliga	VI	7th
2016–17	Rheinlandliga	VI	2nd
2017–18	Rheinlandliga	VI	2nd
2018–19	Rheinlandliga	VI	1st ↑
2019–20	Oberliga Rheinland-Pfalz/Saar	V	18th
2020–21	Oberliga Rheinland-Pfalz/Saar	V	11th
2021–22	Oberliga Rheinland-Pfalz/Saar	V	15th
2022–23	Oberliga Rheinland-Pfalz/Saar	V	

- With the introduction of the Regionalligas in 1994 and the 3. Liga in 2008 as the new third tier, below the 2. Bundesliga, all leagues below dropped one tier. In 2012 the Oberliga Südwest was renamed Oberliga Rheinland-Pfalz/Saar.

↑ Promoted	↓ Relegated
