= Heiligenroth =

- Municipality
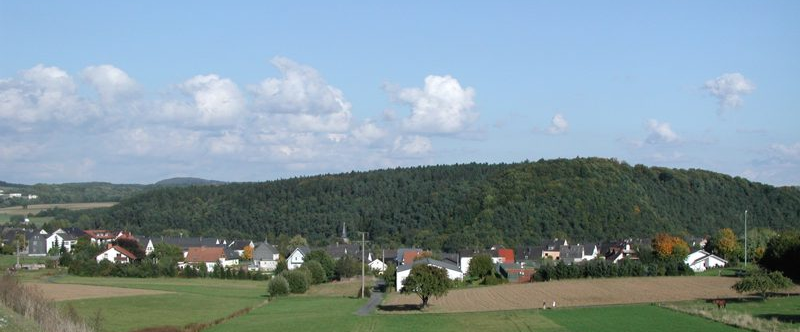

- Coat of arms

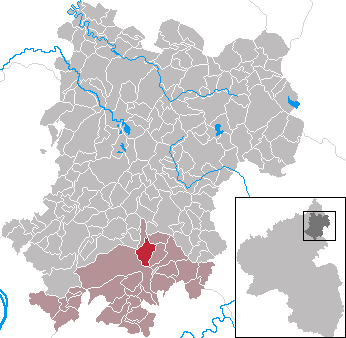
- Location of Heiligenroth within Westerwaldkreis district
- Interactive map of Heiligenroth
- Location within Germany Location within Rhineland-Palatinate
- Coordinates: 50°26′59″N 7°51′54″E
- Country: Germany
- State: Rhineland-Palatinate
- District: Westerwaldkreis
- Municipal assoc.: Montabaur

Government
  - Mayor (2019–24): Daniel Kurth

Area
  - Total: 6.01 km^{2} (2.32 sq mi)
- Elevation: 235 m (771 ft)

Population (2025-12-31)
  - Total: 1,458
  - Density: 243/km^{2} (628/sq mi)
- Time zone: UTC+01:00 (CET)
  - Summer (DST): UTC+02:00 (CEST)
- Postal codes: 56412
- Dialling codes: 02602
- Vehicle registration: WW
- Website: www.heiligenroth.de

Heiligenroth is an Ortsgemeinde – a community belonging to a Verbandsgemeinde – in the Westerwaldkreis in Rhineland-Palatinate, Germany.

== Geography ==
The village lies roughly 3 km from Montabaur. In the immediate vicinity are found Ruppach-Goldhausen, Boden, Staudt, Wirzenborn and Großholbach. The community belongs to the Verbandsgemeinde of Montabaur, a kind of collective municipality.

== Politics ==
=== Community council ===
The council is made up of 17 council members, including the extraofficial mayor (Bürgermeister), who were elected in a municipal election on 7 June 2009.

	CDU	SPD	Wählergruppe Herbst	Wählergruppe Bellessem	Total
2004	6	4	4	2	16 seats

=== Coat of arms ===
The approval to bear a coat of arms was granted by the government assistant on 21 March 1980. In the arms are a red watchtower on a silver background, and a golden lion rampant on a blue background. The watchtower still stands today in Heiligenroth. Formerly it stood alone, with a small church beside it. Only in 1782 was the church that stands today built onto the Romanesque tower. At that time, the tower served a defensive function, hence the loopholes, and it belonged until 1975 to the community, while the church belonged to the parish. It was only then that the tower's ownership passed to the parish.

The choice of Nassau tinctures has not as much to do with the short political connection with the Duchy of Nassau (1802–1866) as it has to do with Heiligenroth's location, which is in the middle of the Nassauer Land. So the Nassau Nature Park begins in Heiligenroth, and even the Bundeswehr soldiers stationed in Montabaur bore Nassau's arms – the golden lion rampant on a blue background – on the left sleeve.

== Culture and sightseeing ==
=== Clubs ===
The community's clubs are a women's choir, a volunteer fire brigade, MGV Hoffnung (men's singing club), a mandolin club, a Möhnenverein (a “foolish women’s club” dedicated to Carnival festivities), a music club, a sport club and a tennis club.

== Economy and infrastructure ==
The community lies in the Westerwald and in the area of the transport association Verkehrsverbund Rhein-Mosel (VRM), zone number 411 and is connected to the local bus network, also it is located close to the A 3, right near the Montabaur interchange. The community's industrial park is separated from the main centre by this motorway, lying to its north. While the Cologne-Frankfurt high-speed rail line was being built, the community was also shielded by a noise barrier. The nearest train station is in Ruppach-Goldhausen at the Lower Westerwald railway (RB29), this line also passes the industrial park of Heiligenroth very close, although there is no train stop yet, same for the Cross Westerwald railway, but this lines section from Montabaur to Wallmerod only is on operation for fright trains. The so-called industrial park (Industriegebiet) busies itself mainly in supplying the area with various service and shopping facilities such as supermarkets, a building centre, quick service restaurants, a furniture warehouse and filling stationss. There are also production businesses there.

Among public institutions there are one kindergarten, a fire brigade, playgrounds, a sporting ground with clubhouse and a beach volleyball court, a parochial centre, the Vogelsanghalle (“Birdsong Hall”) with a bowling alley for major events, the community administration with a youth centre, four tennis courts and a clubhouse, and a Catholic parish church.
