= Simmern, Westerwaldkreis =

Simmern
- Municipality
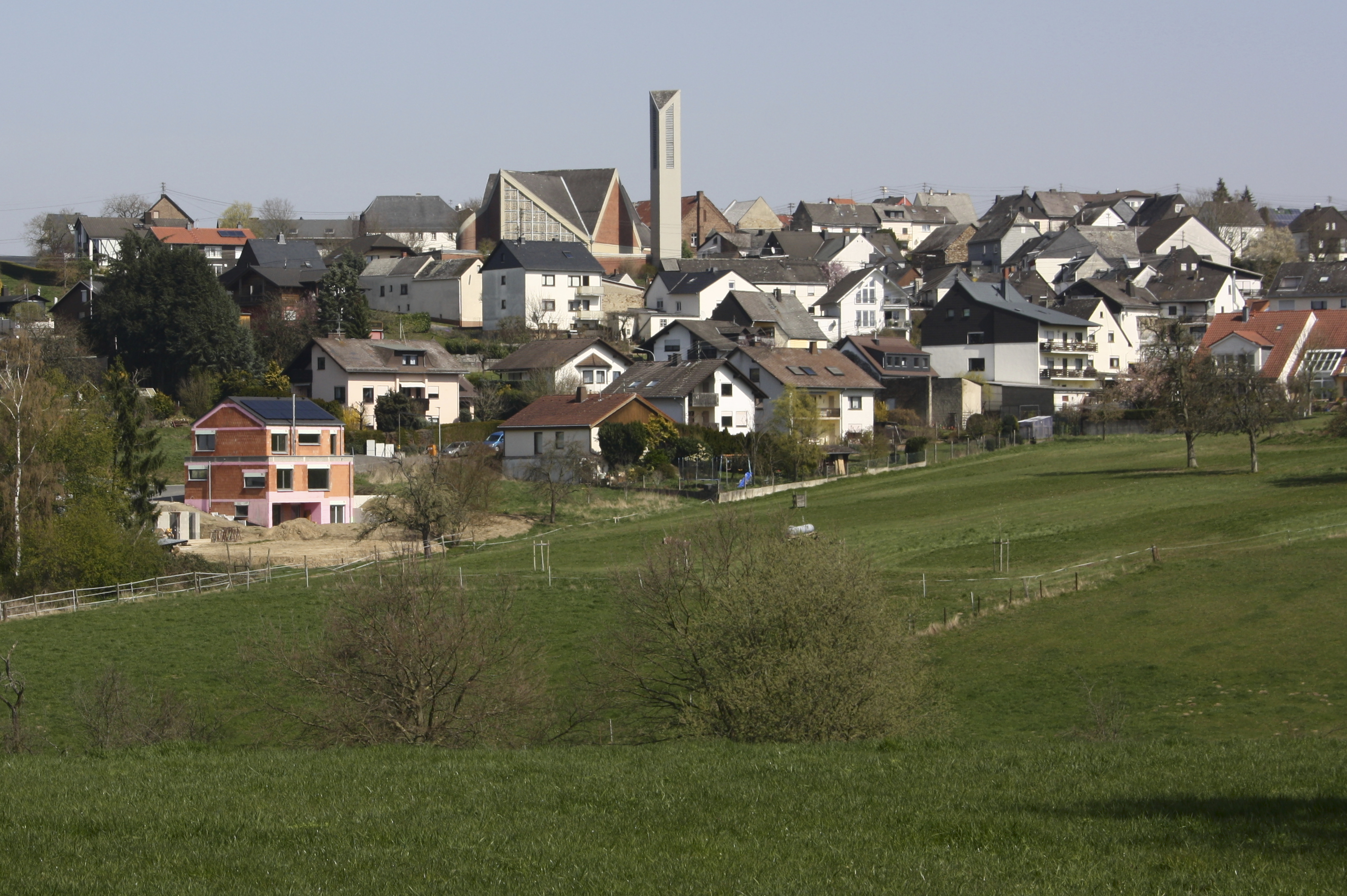

- Coat of arms

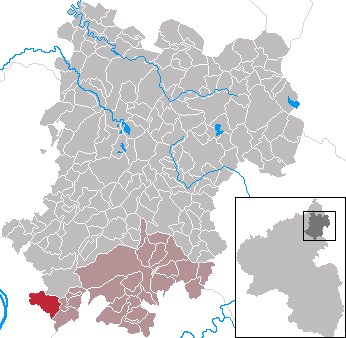
- Location of Simmern within Westerwaldkreis district
- Interactive map of Simmern
- Location within Germany Location within Rhineland-Palatinate
- Coordinates: 50°23′24″N 7°40′26″E
- Country: Germany
- State: Rhineland-Palatinate
- District: Westerwaldkreis
- Municipal assoc.: Montabaur

Government
  - Mayor (2019–24): Jörg Haseneier (CDU)

Area
  - Total: 9.09 km^{2} (3.51 sq mi)
- Elevation: 290 m (950 ft)

Population (2025-12-31)
  - Total: 1,507
  - Density: 166/km^{2} (429/sq mi)
- Time zone: UTC+01:00 (CET)
  - Summer (DST): UTC+02:00 (CEST)
- Postal codes: 56337
- Dialling codes: 02620
- Vehicle registration: WW
- Website: www.simmern-ww.de

Simmern (German pronunciation: [ˈzɪmɐn]) is an Ortsgemeinde – a community belonging to a Verbandsgemeinde – in the Westerwaldkreis in Rhineland-Palatinate, Germany.

== Geography ==
=== Location ===
The community lies in the Westerwald east of Koblenz on the edge of the Nassau Nature Park. The village is characterized by agriculture and commuters to the nearby greater centre of Koblenz. The community belongs to the Verbandsgemeinde of Montabaur, a kind of collective municipality. Its seat is in the town of the same name.

=== Neighbouring communities ===
Simmern's neighbours are Neuhäusel, Koblenz, Montabaur, Eitelborn, Urbar, Vallendar and Kadenbach.

== History ==
In 1198, Simmern's mention was first recorded in a document as Sevenburnen.

== Politics ==
=== Community council ===
The council is made up of 17 council members, including the extraofficial mayor (Bürgermeister), who were elected in a municipal election on 13 June 2004.

| | CDU | SPD | FBG | Total |
| 2004 | 9 | 4 | 3 | 16 seats |

=== Coat of arms ===
The wavy embattled (in the heraldic sense) pale with seven battlements in the community's arms refers to the placename Simmern, whose original name of Sevenburnen can be taken to mean “seven springs, wells, cisterns”. The red cross refers to Simmern's allegiance to the Electorate of Trier until 1803 and the golden lion to its allegiance to the Duchy of Nassau from 1815 to 1866.

== Culture and sightseeing ==
=== Music ===
Currently there are three musical clubs in the community. These are the Apollonia Men's Singing Club founded in 1962, the St. Rochus church choir and the music club, which has been in existence since 1930.

== Economy and infrastructure ==
The nearest Autobahn interchange is Höhr-Grenzhausen on the A 48, some 9 km away. The nearest railway station is in Koblenz on the Rechte Rheinstrecke.
