= Neuhäusel =

- Municipality
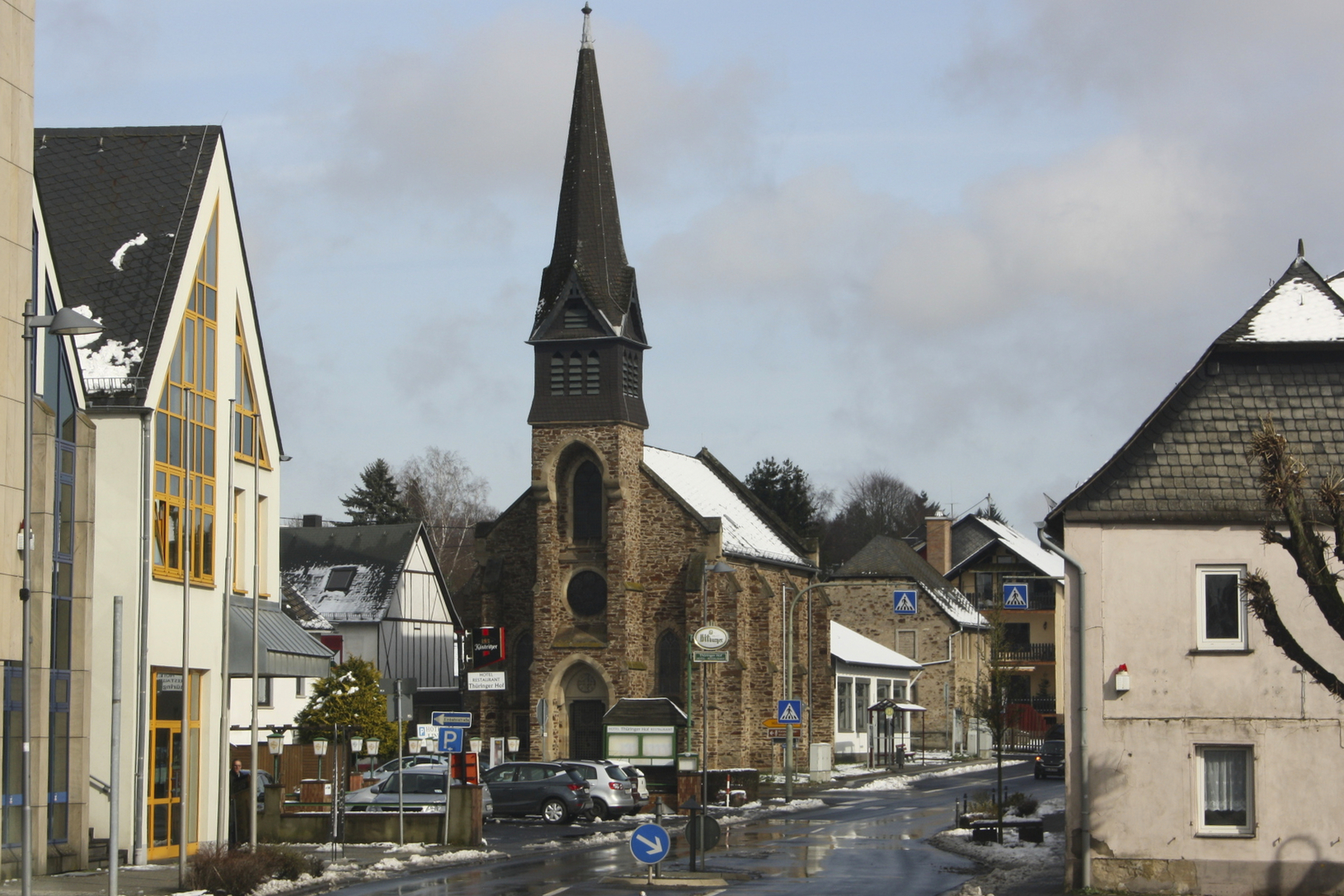

- Coat of arms

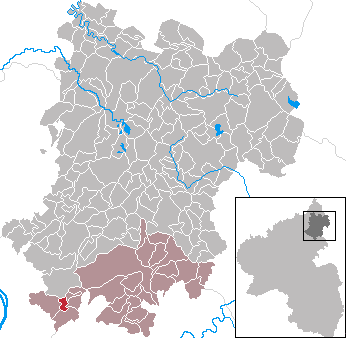
- Location of Neuhäusel within Westerwaldkreis district
- Interactive map of Neuhäusel
- Location within Germany Location within Rhineland-Palatinate
- Coordinates: 50°23′13″N 7°42′48″E
- Country: Germany
- State: Rhineland-Palatinate
- District: Westerwaldkreis
- Municipal assoc.: Montabaur

Government
  - Mayor (2019–24): Werner Christmann

Area
  - Total: 1.67 km^{2} (0.64 sq mi)
- Elevation: 340 m (1,120 ft)

Population (2025-12-31)
  - Total: 2,009
  - Density: 1,200/km^{2} (3,120/sq mi)
- Time zone: UTC+01:00 (CET)
  - Summer (DST): UTC+02:00 (CEST)
- Postal codes: 56335
- Dialling codes: 02620
- Vehicle registration: WW
- Website: www.vg-montabaur.de

Neuhäusel is an Ortsgemeinde – a community belonging to a Verbandsgemeinde – in the Westerwaldkreis in Rhineland-Palatinate, Germany. The community has been since early 2006 a major investment and activity centre for village renewal.

== Geography ==
Neuhäusel lies in the area of the Augst communities (a small region) and belongs to the Verbandsgemeinde of Montabaur, a kind of collective municipality. Its seat is in the town of the same name. Environmentally, Neuhäusel is part of the Lower Westerwald in the Nassau Nature Park.

== History ==
Musbach, which had its first documentary mention in 1198 as Neuhäusel's forerunner, was a small village that lay near where today's Ortsgemeinde lies. It was followed by Neuspay, which had its last documentary mention in 1537, and Wirt beym Creutz, named in 1669. In 1675, the name Neuhäusel appeared for the first time. The community, which in 1789 was joined with the community of Eitelborn, became a separate community on 5 April 1810. Owing to its location on the important traffic link between the Rhine and the Westerwald, Neuhäusel developed over the centuries from a rest stop for travelers to a central community.

== Politics ==
=== Community council ===
The council is made up of 16 council members who were elected in a majority vote in a municipal election on 13 June 2004.

- CDU 7 seats
- SPD 2 seats
- UBG 3 seats
- FWV 4 seats

=== Coat of arms ===
Trade, transport and the community on both sides of the road are represented in the community's arms by the two half wagon wheels and the silver field in the middle. The old St. Anna-Kirche (church) built in 1877 is shown as a red steeple with a west portal. Saint Donatus is symbolized by a blue sword with a golden grip. The green double flank represents the community's charming location.

=== Town partnerships ===
Sauvigny-les-Bois, Nièvre, France, since 1992

== Economy and infrastructure ==
=== Transport ===
The community is connected to the public bus transport through the lines 167, 446, 460, 469 and 558, located in the area of the transport association Verkehrsverbund Rhein-Mosel (VRM) and linked to the road network through Bundesstraße 49 (Montabaur-Koblenz). Nearest train station is Koblenz-Ehrenbreitstein.

=== Fire services ===
The Verbandsgemeinde of Montabaur maintains three fire stations within its limits, one of which is in Neuhäusel. Its response area includes not only Neuhäusel, but also the municipal areas of Eitelborn, Kadenbach and Simmern.
