= Nentershausen, Rhineland-Palatinate =

Nentershausen
- Municipality
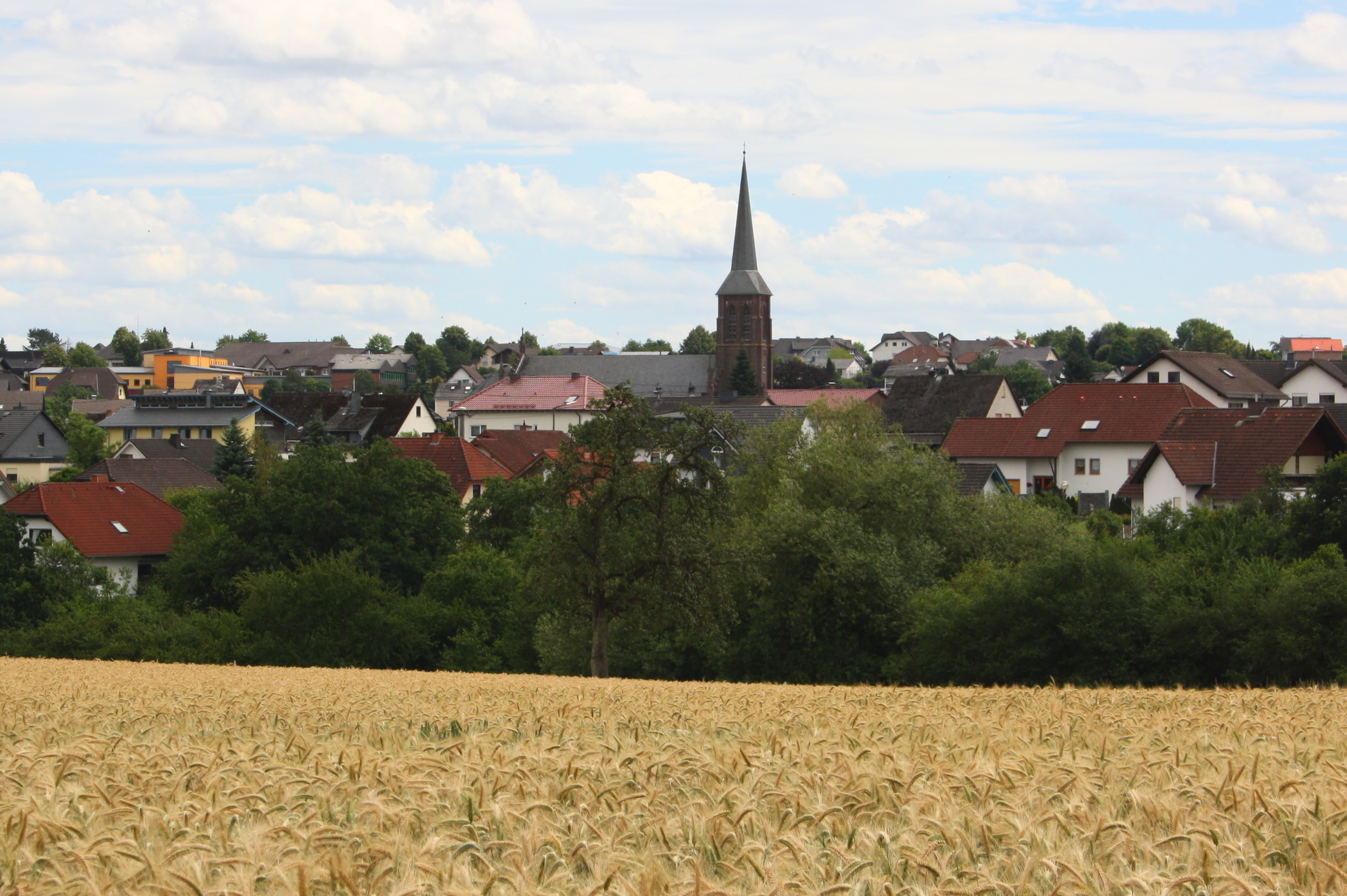

- Coat of arms

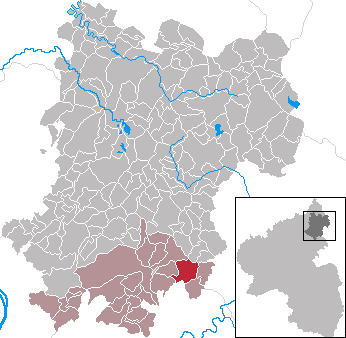
- Location of Nentershausen within Westerwaldkreis district
- Interactive map of Nentershausen
- Location within Germany Location within Rhineland-Palatinate
- Coordinates: 50°25′14″N 7°56′5″E
- Country: Germany
- State: Rhineland-Palatinate
- District: Westerwaldkreis
- Municipal assoc.: Montabaur

Government
  - Mayor (2019–24): Thomas Weidenfeller (CDU)

Area
  - Total: 7.55 km^{2} (2.92 sq mi)
- Elevation: 286 m (938 ft)

Population (2025-12-31)
  - Total: 2,061
  - Density: 273/km^{2} (707/sq mi)
- Time zone: UTC+01:00 (CET)
  - Summer (DST): UTC+02:00 (CEST)
- Postal codes: 56412
- Dialling codes: 06485
- Vehicle registration: WW
- Website: www.nentershausen-westerwald.de

Nentershausen (German pronunciation: [nɛntɐsˈhaʊzn̩]) is an Ortsgemeinde – a community belonging to a Verbandsgemeinde – in the Westerwaldkreis in Rhineland-Palatinate, Germany.

== Geography ==
=== Location ===
The community lies in the Westerwald between Limburg an der Lahn and Montabaur on the edge of the Nassau Nature Park. The community belongs to the Verbandsgemeinde of Montabaur, a kind of collective municipality. Its seat is in the like-named town.

=== Neighbouring communities ===
Nentershausen's immediate neighbours are Eppenrod, Kleinholbach, Görgeshausen, Heilberscheid, Niedererbach and Nomborn.

== History ==
In 841, Nentershausen had its first documentary mention.

== Politics ==
=== Community council ===
The council is made up of 13 council members, including the extraofficial mayor (Bürgermeister), who were elected in a municipal election on 13 June 2004.

	CDU	Wählergruppe Greiser	Wählergruppe Ortseifen	Total
2004	5	9	2	16 seats

=== Coat of arms ===
The community's arms are formed out of its three court seals. Nentershausen, which came from the hereditary holdings of the Counts of Diez, was finally passed to the Electorate of Trier in 1564. The joint Trier-Nassau overlordship first worked out the Treaty of Diez of 1564. The Diez lion and the Trier cross display this collective political fate. The cloverleaves are taken as a special local Nentershausen emblem.

=== Partnerships ===
Vieux-Berquin, Nord, France

== Culture and sightseeing ==
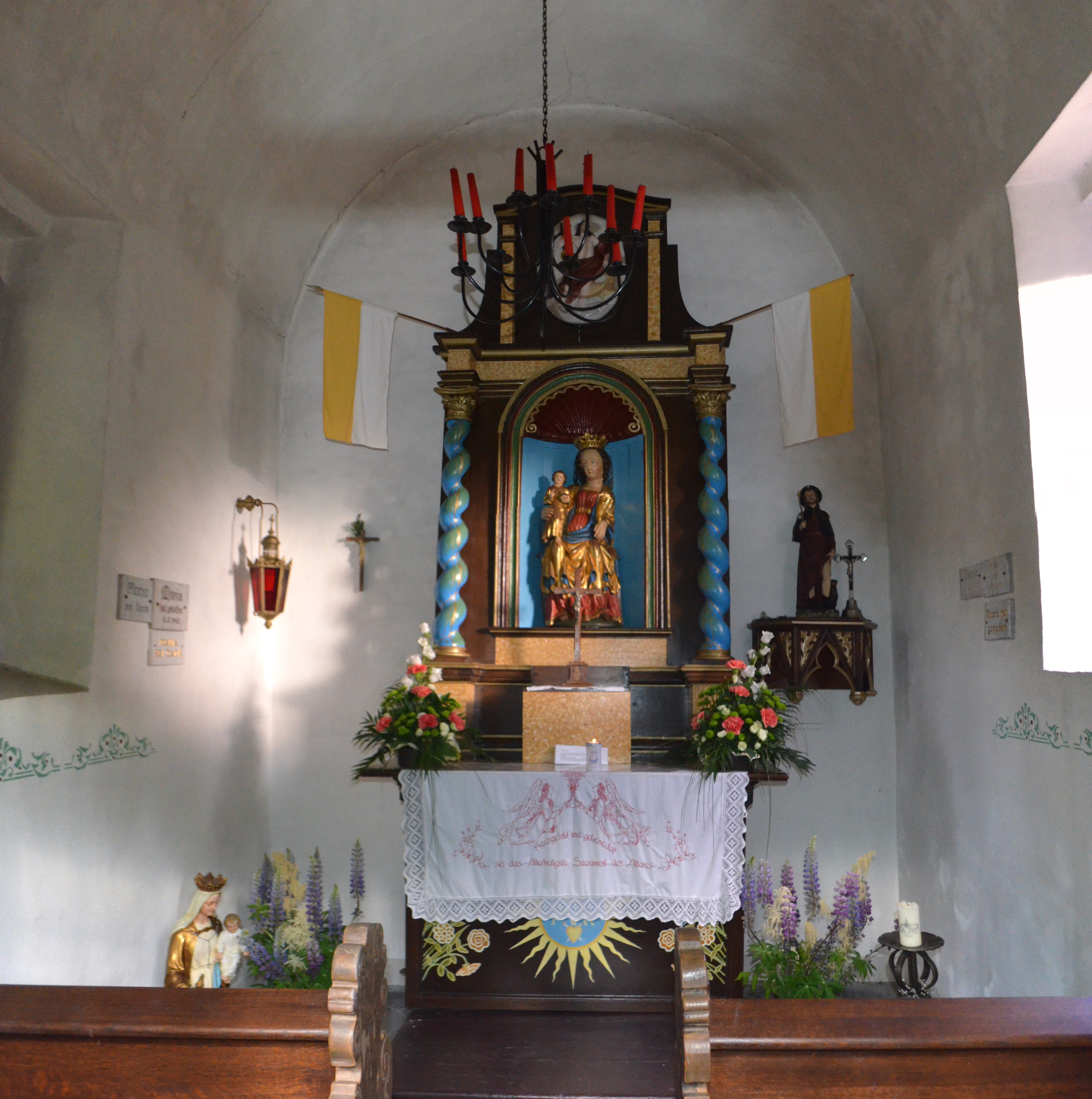
Chapel, Nentershausen

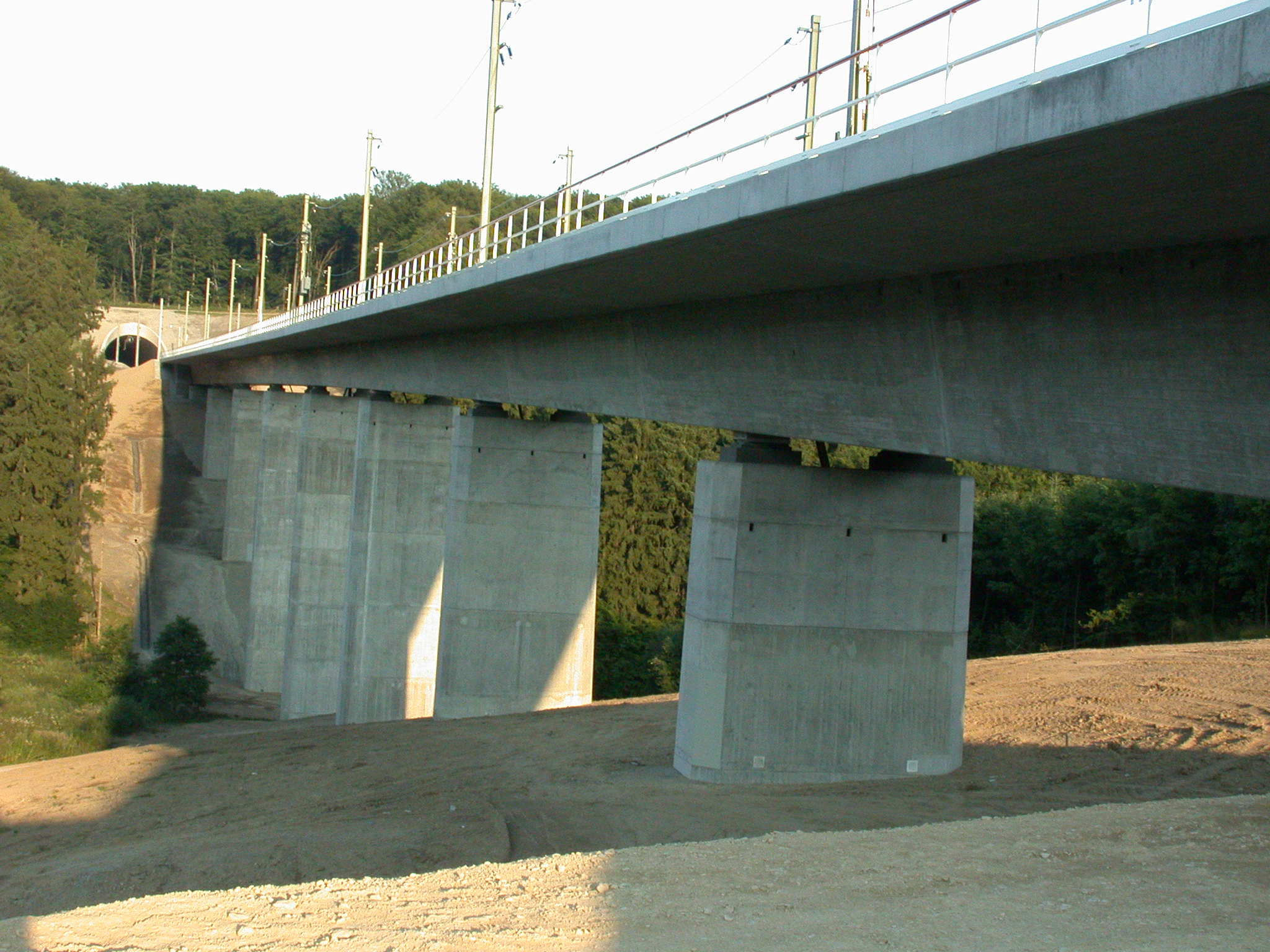
Wiesengrund Bridge on the Frankfurt-Cologne ICE line in Nentershausen's municipal area, photographed during building in 2001

- Kirche St. Laurentius, (church) built in 1863
- Feldkreuz, historic monument of 1938 from the Catholic youth, sign of resistance against the NSDAP regime, dedicate Sep. 25, 1938, by Kaplan Lücker
- Bürgerhaus 2005 (community centre)
- Chapel Nentershausen, Kapellenweg street
- Sport- und Veranstaltungshalle Freiherr-vom-Stein-Halle 1985 (sport and event hall)
- Regionalschule 1975 and Grundschule 1998 (regional and primary schools)
- Feuerwehrhaus (1990) (fire station)

=== Regular events ===
A kermis is held on the second weekend in August.

== Economy and infrastructure ==
Important employers are businesses in filling station building, container and machine building, transport technology, building materials (roofing cardboard), plastic processing, Fördertechnik beside crafting operations from construction side industries.

Many of those in the workforce commute to Limburg, Frankfurt, Montabaur or Koblenz.

=== Transport ===
The nearest Autobahn interchange is Diez on the A 3 (Cologne–Frankfurt), about 1 km away. The nearest train stops are in Niedererbach and Steinefrenz at the Lower Westerwald railway (RB29). The local bus lines 450 (Limburg - Diez - Montabaur) and 575 (Diez - Nentershausen) serve the village. InterCityExpress connections are to be had through the railway station at Limburg and Montabaur on the Cologne-Frankfurt high-speed rail line, each just under 12 km away on the A 3. Marked hiking paths are around the community. Nentershausen is located in the area of the local transport association Verkehrsverbund Rhein-Mosel (VRM), fare zone number 409.

=== Education ===
Kindergarten, primary and regional schools; secondary andvocational schools in Montabaur, Diez and Limburg.
