= Oberelbert =

- Municipality
- Coat of arms

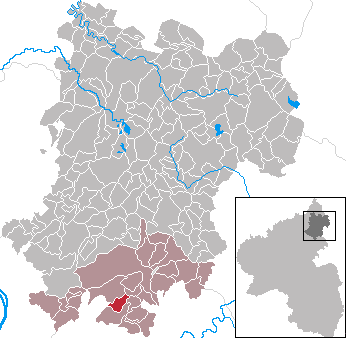
- Location of Oberelbert within Westerwaldkreis district
- Interactive map of Oberelbert
- Location within Germany Location within Rhineland-Palatinate
- Coordinates: 50°23′30″N 7°49′2″E
- Country: Germany
- State: Rhineland-Palatinate
- District: Westerwaldkreis
- Municipal assoc.: Montabaur

Government
  - Mayor (2019–24): Sebastian Stendebach

Area
  - Total: 3.45 km^{2} (1.33 sq mi)
- Elevation: 310 m (1,020 ft)

Population (2025-12-31)
  - Total: 1,225
  - Density: 355/km^{2} (920/sq mi)
- Time zone: UTC+01:00 (CET)
  - Summer (DST): UTC+02:00 (CEST)
- Postal codes: 56412
- Dialling codes: 02608
- Vehicle registration: WW
- Website: www.oberelbert.de

Oberelbert is an Ortsgemeinde – a community belonging to a Verbandsgemeinde – in the Westerwaldkreis in Rhineland-Palatinate, Germany.

== Geography ==
The community's elevation ranges from 310 to 340 m above sea level.

Oberelbert lies roughly 5 km south of Montabaur in the Nassau Nature Park on the Stelzenbach. The community belongs to the Verbandsgemeinde of Montabaur, a kind of collective municipality. Its seat is in the like-named town.

== History ==
Sometime before 1200, in the municipal area (Bann) of the village of Humbach (Montabaur), the Archbishop of Trier owned, among other things, a Wildhube (a fief that required the holder to protect Imperial hunting rights) at Elewartin. In the time between 1212 and 1214 there was in the extensive woodlands around Humbach – the Spurginberch Forest – two Försterhuben at Elwartin. These were foresters’ farmsteads with fields in the forest. In 1233 there was a dispute between members of the St. Florin Monastery at Koblenz involving the use of the Pfaffenholz Forest near Elewarthe. In 1362 came a documentary mention of Niederelbert (inferiori Elewarten), which suggests that there must have been an Oberelbert by this time, too (Nieder– is German for “nether” or “lower”, while Ober– means “upper”). It was not until 1436, however, that Oberelbert was explicitly named (Obern and Nyddern Elwart). In a treaty, the Lords of Helfenstein, as holders of the Elbert landlordship, and the villages of Nieder Elbartt and Obern Elbartt reached a compromise thanks to concessions from the farmers and a meal from the landlords.

In 1476, or by 1584 at the latest, Oberelbert had a chapel. The Oberelbert coalmine was part of the Amt and Bann of Montabaur before 1500, but after the Bann of Montabaur was partitioned about 1550 or 1560, the community passed to the Bann of Holler. In 1508, the representatives from Oberelbert and Niederelbert acknowledged by old usage in a Weisentum the Archbishop of Trier as their overlord and the Lords of Helfenstein as Lords of the Court. In 1519, the Archbishop of Trier transferred half the Elbert landlordship to the Lords of Nassau (at the Sporkenburg, which was a castle) as a fief. In 1602, three fourths of the landlordship was held by the Lords of Metternich. The other fourth was a cameralistic possession in the Electorate of Trier. Between 1630 and 1636, during the Thirty Years' War, Oberelbert was utterly destroyed and became uninhabitable. Beginning about 1642, building work to restore the community and settle it once again was undertaken.

In 1711, a new chapel was built. In 1770, a parish was established with Welschneudorf as a branch. In 1795, the villagers brought their livestock to the Metternicher Heck (paddock) before the plundering French Revolutionary Army could steal the animals. In 1802, Oberelbert's hitherto Trier subjects became subjects of the Duchy of Nassau.

On 12 September 1811, the village burnt down, leaving only six small houses standing. Many important buildings had to be restored. In 1812, the community bakery was built once again, followed by the parish house in 1815 and 1816, the school in 1823 and 1824 and the church between 1830 and 1832.

Between 1813 and 1815, scattered French soldiers on their way back home from Russia brought typhus to the village. Many died as a result of this illness. In 1820, the graveyard was moved from the church to its current location.

In 1866, the Duchy was annexed by Prussia. In 1913, at the Bußkreuz, an aerodrome was established. In mid-August, two planes were in an accident during approach.

In 1916, during the First World War, petroleum shortages led to a quickening of the electrical supply. On 3 March, electric streetlights shone for the first time. In 1923, the houses were connected to the new central waterworks. Postal bus service between Montabaur and Welschneudorf by way of Oberelbert was begun on 11 November 1926. Between 1926 and 1931, there was considerable building work in the community. In the Second World War (1939–1945), 38 Oberelberters lost their lives as a result of acts of war.

After the war, the community was expanded beginning in 1953. A new school was built in 1962 and dedicated in 1964. Rubbish collection began in 1966. In 1972, the community joined the Verbandsgemeinde of Montabaur. In 1982, schooling in the community ended. The Stelzenbachhalle (community hall) was built in 1993 and 1994, and dedicated on 25 November 1994.

In 1997, Oberelbert was expecting its one thousandth inhabitant.

== Politics ==
=== Community council ===
The council is made up of 17 council members, including the extraofficial mayor (Bürgermeister), who were elected in a majority vote in a municipal election on 13 June 2004.

=== Coat of arms ===
The community's name is symbolized in the arms by the two antlers. Standing above, for the hereditary mill is the golden, eight-spoked waterwheel in blue. The silver bend sinister wavy symbolizes the Stelzenbach. The tinctures blue and gold stand for the former territorial allegiance to the Duchy of Nassau. The church is symbolized by the old neat flèche as a small belltower with black “sound windows” below in a red field. The tinctures red and silver are those formerly borne by the Electorate of Trier.

=== Town partnerships ===
(Germany) Fischbach/Rhön, Thuringia

Also known as Fischbach bei Bad Salzungen, this community is a small village in the Rhön near Kaltennordheim.
