= Daubach =

Daubach may refer to the following places in Rhineland-Palatinate, Germany.

- Daubach, Hunsrück
- Daubach, Westerwaldkreis
