= Niederelbert =

- Municipality
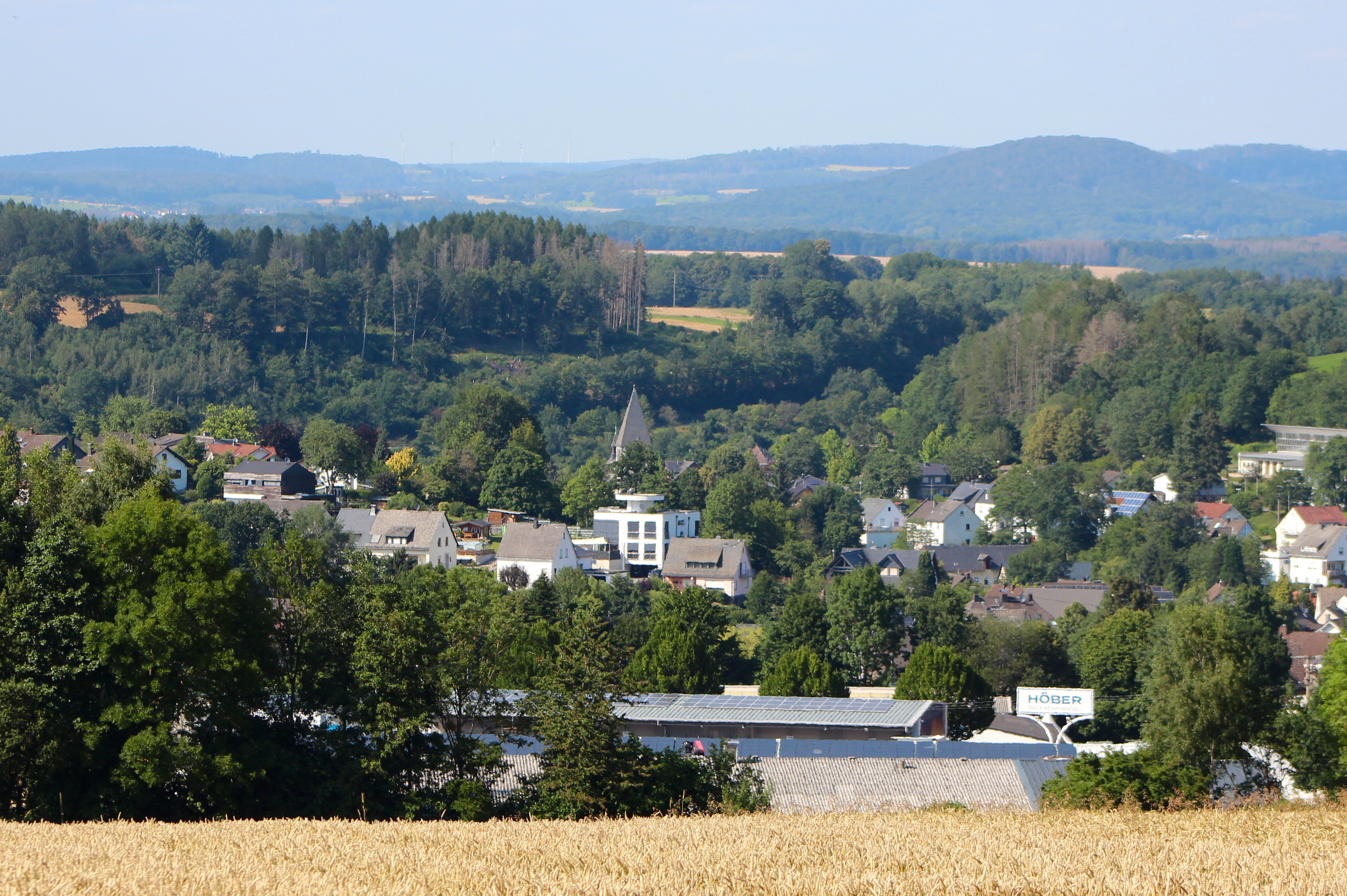

- Coat of arms

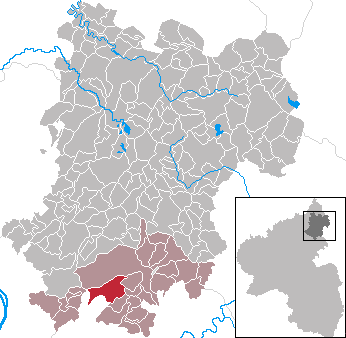
- Location of Niederelbert within Westerwaldkreis district
- Interactive map of Niederelbert
- Location within Germany Location within Rhineland-Palatinate
- Coordinates: 50°24′28″N 7°48′45″E
- Country: Germany
- State: Rhineland-Palatinate
- District: Westerwaldkreis
- Municipal assoc.: Montabaur

Government
  - Mayor (2019–24): Christoph Neyer

Area
  - Total: 10.26 km^{2} (3.96 sq mi)
- Elevation: 264 m (866 ft)

Population (2025-12-31)
  - Total: 1,763
  - Density: 171.8/km^{2} (445.0/sq mi)
- Time zone: UTC+01:00 (CET)
  - Summer (DST): UTC+02:00 (CEST)
- Postal codes: 56412
- Dialling codes: 02602
- Vehicle registration: WW
- Website: www.niederelbert.de

Niederelbert is an Ortsgemeinde – a community belonging to a Verbandsgemeinde – in the Westerwaldkreis in Rhineland-Palatinate, Germany.

== Geography ==
The municipal area ranges in elevation from 240 to 275 m above sea level.

=== Location ===
The community lies in the Westerwald south of Montabaur in the Nassau Nature Park. The community belongs to the Verbandsgemeinde of Montabaur, a kind of collective municipality. Its seat is in the like-named town.

=== Neighbouring communities ===
Niederelbert's neighbours are Oberelbert, Holler, Horressen and Montabaur.

== History ==
In 1211, Niederelbert had its first documentary mention. Other forms of the name over the centuries are Elewarthe (1233), Elwarten (1260), Eylewart (1326), Elwert (1385), Nederen eelfart (1427), Nederen Elwert (1499) and Niederlebert (1786).

=== Religion ===
In Niederelbert there is a Catholic church. It was consecrated in 1910 and has been known since then as St. Josef.

== Politics ==
=== Community council ===
The council is made up of 13 council members, including the extraofficial mayor (Bürgermeister), who were elected in a municipal election on 13 June 2004.

	Freie Wähler Niederelbert	Wählergruppe FWG	Total
2004	10	6	16 seats

=== Coat of arms ===
The two silver antlers in the chief of the community's arms refer to its old name Elewarthin. The golden lily in blue is taken from the arms borne by the feudal lords of Helfenstein. For the four brooks (Elbertbach, Gambach, Seelebach and Weiherhellbach), the arms symbolically bear the golden wavy fess with the four waves. The cock, Niederelbert's customary emblem, has been included as a charge in the civic arms, in silver tincture on a red background, and armed Or (ie with golden claws). Red and silver are also the tinctures used in the arms borne by the old Electorate of Trier.

== Economy and infrastructure ==
The nearest Autobahn interchange is Montabaur on the A 3 (Cologne–Frankfurt), some 4 km away. The nearest InterCityExpress stop is the railway station at Montabaur on the Cologne-Frankfurt high-speed rail line. There are also regional connections there.

== Notable people ==
- Rudolf Scharping (born 2 December 1947), SPD politician, former German Defence Minister
