= Untershausen =

Place in Rhineland-Palatinate, Germany

- Municipality
- Coat of arms

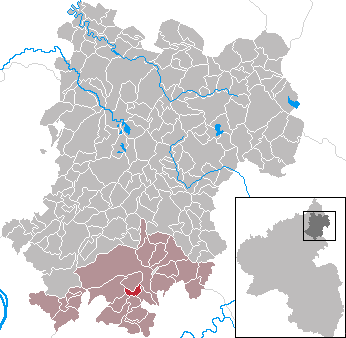
- Location of Untershausen within Westerwaldkreis district
- Interactive map of Untershausen
- Location within Germany Location within Rhineland-Palatinate
- Coordinates: 50°24′3″N 7°50′42″E
- Country: Germany
- State: Rhineland-Palatinate
- District: Westerwaldkreis
- Municipal assoc.: Montabaur

Government
  - Mayor (2019–24): Cornelia Baas

Area
  - Total: 1.92 km^{2} (0.74 sq mi)
- Elevation: 335 m (1,099 ft)

Population (2025-12-31)
  - Total: 524
  - Density: 273/km^{2} (707/sq mi)
- Time zone: UTC+01:00 (CET)
  - Summer (DST): UTC+02:00 (CEST)
- Postal codes: 56412
- Dialling codes: 02602
- Vehicle registration: WW
- Website: www.untershausen.de

Untershausen is an Ortsgemeinde – a community belonging to a Verbandsgemeinde – in the Westerwaldkreis in Rhineland-Palatinate, Germany.

== Geography ==
The community lies in the Westerwald south of Montabaur in the Nassau Nature Park. The community belongs to the Verbandsgemeinde of Montabaur, a kind of collective municipality. Its seat is in the like-named town.

== History ==
In 1220, Untershausen had its first documentary mention as Bungelshausen.

== Politics ==
=== Community council ===
The council is made up of 12 council members who were elected in a majority vote in a municipal election on 13 June 2004.

=== Coat of arms ===
The two red roses with green sepals and silver centres, with their Isenburg tinctures refer to the first documentary mention. The tinctures for law and wisdom, however, which the roses can also be said to have, recall the old Isenburg court's jurisdiction. The silver roof with its noteworthy ridge turret stands in the red point for the old bakehouse of Untershausen. The three-leafed beech twig stands with its green tincture for the forest and the Untershausen municipal area.

== Economy and infrastructure ==
The nearest Autobahn interchange is Montabaur on the A 3 (Cologne–Frankfurt), some 7 km away. The nearest InterCityExpress stops are the railway stations at Montabaur on the Cologne-Frankfurt high-speed rail line and Koblenz on the Rechte Rheinstrecke.
