= Gackenbach =

- Municipality
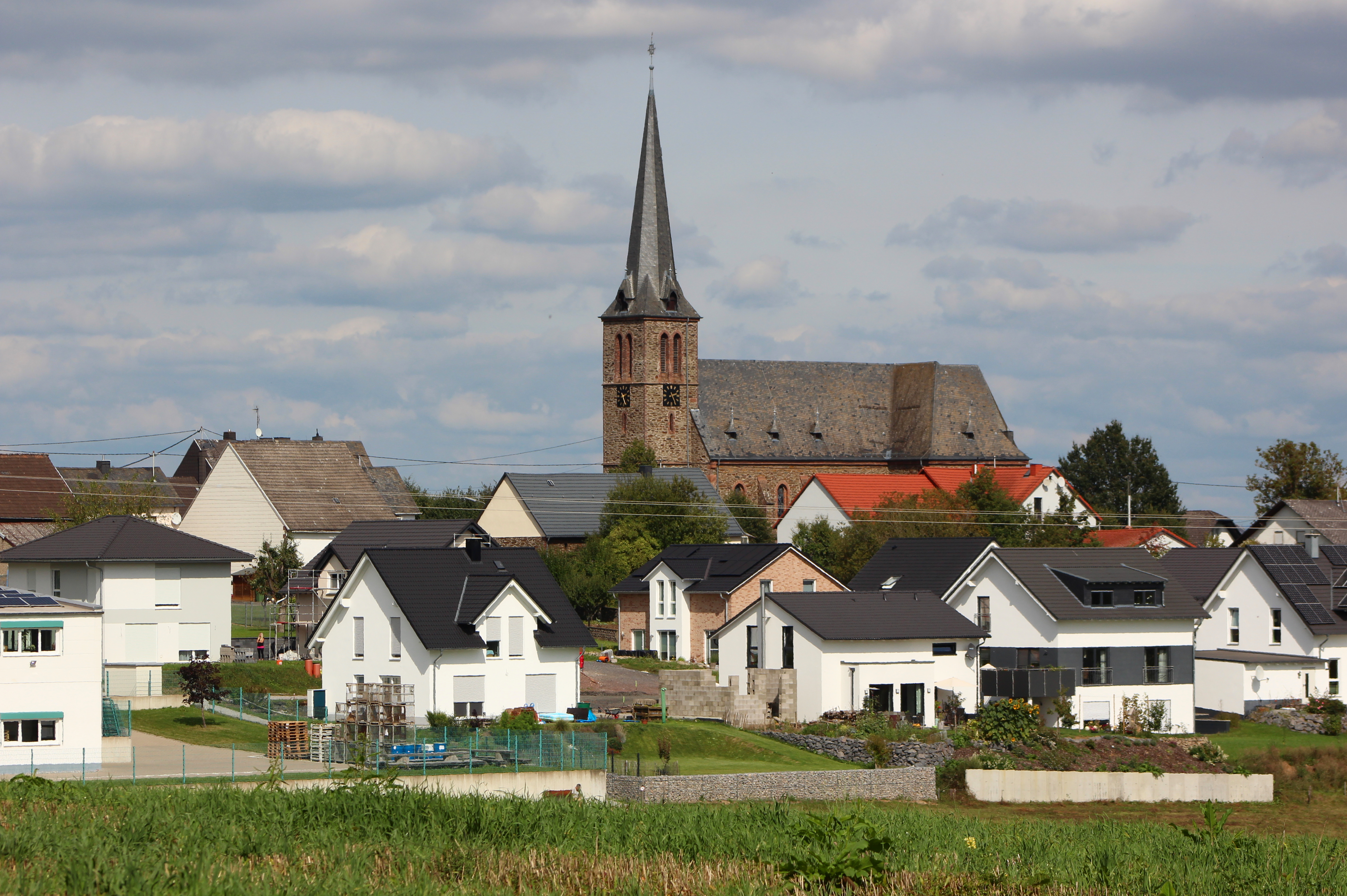

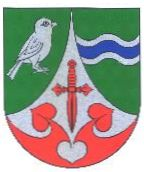
- Coat of arms

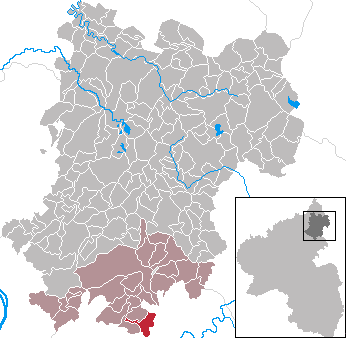
- Location of Gackenbach within Westerwaldkreis district
- Interactive map of Gackenbach
- Location within Germany Location within Rhineland-Palatinate
- Coordinates: 50°22′10″N 7°51′36″E
- Country: Germany
- State: Rhineland-Palatinate
- District: Westerwaldkreis
- Municipal assoc.: Montabaur
- Subdivisions: 2 Ortsteile

Government
  - Mayor (2019–24): Hans Ulrich Weidenfeller

Area
  - Total: 4.75 km^{2} (1.83 sq mi)
- Elevation: 300 m (980 ft)

Population (2025-12-31)
  - Total: 541
  - Density: 114/km^{2} (295/sq mi)
- Time zone: UTC+01:00 (CET)
  - Summer (DST): UTC+02:00 (CEST)
- Postal codes: 56412
- Dialling codes: 06439
- Vehicle registration: WW
- Website: www.gackenbach-ww.de

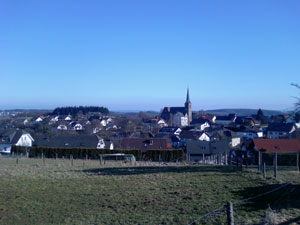
View of the municipality

Gackenbach is an Ortsgemeinde – a municipality belonging to a Verbandsgemeinde – in the Westerwaldkreis in Rhineland-Palatinate, Germany. It belongs to the Verbandsgemeinde of Montabaur, a kind of collective municipality.

== Geography ==
=== Location ===
Gackenbach lies in the Buchfinkenland in the southern Westerwald as well as in the geographical triangle between Koblenz, Limburg an der Lahn and Montabaur in the middle of the Nassau Nature Park.

=== Constituent communities ===
==== Dies ====
Dies lies below Gackenbach in the Gelbach Valley. It has roughly 65 inhabitants. It is in the Gelbachtal which is famous for motor bikers during the summer.

==== Kirchähr ====
The constituent municipality of Kirchähr also lies in the Gelbach Valley and consists mainly of the Karlsheim Kirchähr, a youth and meeting centre of the Bishopric of Limburg with its own campground for tents on the other side of the Gelbach.

== History ==
In 1290, Gackenbach had its first documentary mention.

== Politics ==
The municipal council is made up of 13 council members, including the extraofficial mayor (Bürgermeister), who were elected in a municipal election on 7 June 2009.

== Culture and sightseeing ==
=== Wild- und Freizeitpark Westerwald ===
In Gackenbach is found the Wild- und Freizeitpark Westerwald (“Westerwald Wilderness and Amusement Park”), where visitors can observe many native species of animal as well as wisent in their natural habitat in an area of 4 ha. Also, there are a petting zoo, barbecue pits and a 400-m-long summer toboggan run.

== Economy and infrastructure ==
F. Stephan Medizintechnik GmbH manufactures devices for medical use.

== Notable people ==
- Martin Stadtfeld, pianist
