= Montabaur (Verbandsgemeinde) =

Municipality in Rhineland-Palatinate, Germany

- Verbandsgemeinde
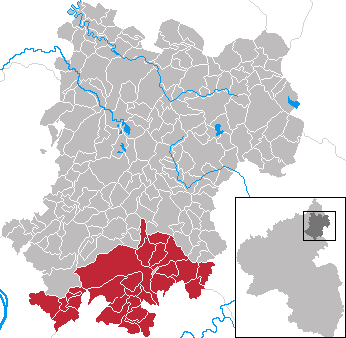
- Location of Montabaur within Westerwaldkreis district
- Interactive map of Montabaur
- Location within Germany Location within Rhineland-Palatinate
- Coordinates: 50°26′N 7°50′E
- Country: Germany
- State: Rhineland-Palatinate
- District: Westerwaldkreis
- Seat: Montabaur
- Subdivisions: 25 municipalities

Area
  - Total: 151.43 km^{2} (58.47 sq mi)

Population (2025-12-31)
  - Total: 41,634
  - Density: 274.94/km^{2} (712.09/sq mi)
- Time zone: UTC+01:00 (CET)
  - Summer (DST): UTC+02:00 (CEST)
- Website: www.vg-montabaur.de

Montabaur is a Verbandsgemeinde ("collective municipality") in the district Westerwaldkreis, in Rhineland-Palatinate, Germany. The seat of the Verbandsgemeinde is in Montabaur.

The V.G. is represented by a council of 44 members plus 5 associates and is headed by a Bürgermeister or mayor. The current mayor is Hans Ulrich Richter-Hopprich, elected in 2017. He is a member of the CDU party.

The Verbandsgemeinde Montabaur consists of the following Ortsgemeinden ("local municipalities"):

1. Boden
2. Daubach
3. Eitelborn
4. Gackenbach
5. Girod
6. Görgeshausen
7. Großholbach
8. Heilberscheid
9. Heiligenroth
10. Holler
11. Horbach
12. Hübingen
13. Kadenbach
14. Montabaur
15. Nentershausen
16. Neuhäusel
17. Niederelbert
18. Niedererbach
19. Nomborn
20. Oberelbert
21. Ruppach-Goldhausen
22. Simmern
23. Stahlhofen
24. Untershausen
25. Welschneudorf
