= Horbach, Westerwaldkreis =

Horbach
- Municipality
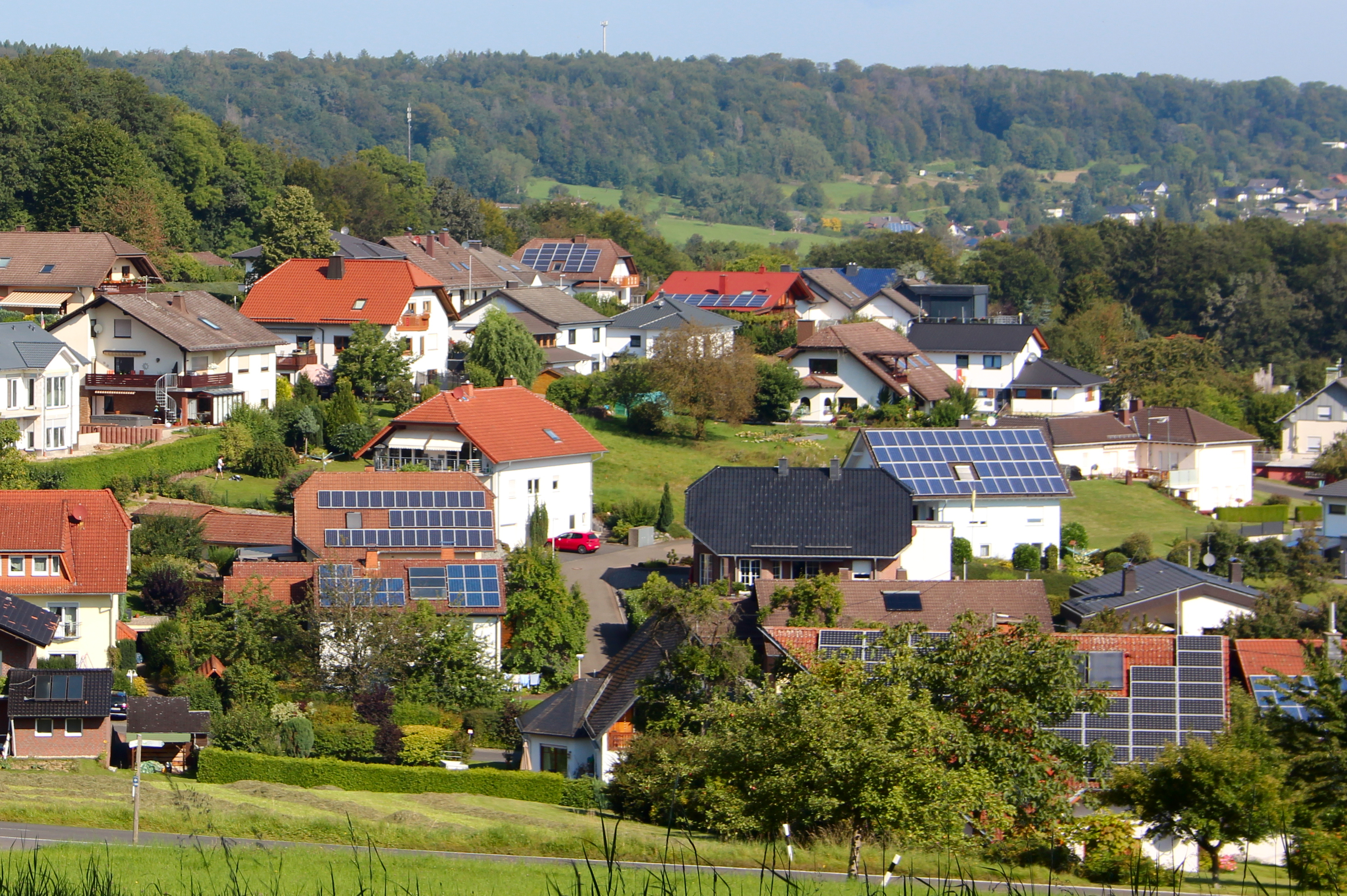

- Coat of arms

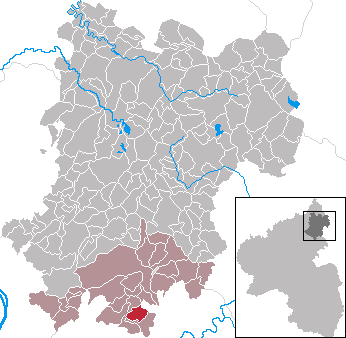
- Location of Horbach within Westerwaldkreis district
- Interactive map of Horbach
- Location within Germany Location within Rhineland-Palatinate
- Coordinates: 50°22′23″N 7°51′10″E
- Country: Germany
- State: Rhineland-Palatinate
- District: Westerwaldkreis
- Municipal assoc.: Montabaur

Government
  - Mayor (2019–24): Christoph Büttner

Area
  - Total: 3.93 km^{2} (1.52 sq mi)
- Elevation: 305 m (1,001 ft)

Population (2025-12-31)
  - Total: 701
  - Density: 178/km^{2} (462/sq mi)
- Time zone: UTC+01:00 (CET)
  - Summer (DST): UTC+02:00 (CEST)
- Postal codes: 56412
- Dialling codes: 06439
- Vehicle registration: WW
- Website: www.vg-montabaur.de

Horbach (German pronunciation: [ˈhɔʁbax]) is an Ortsgemeinde – a municipality belonging to a Verbandsgemeinde – in the Westerwaldkreis in Rhineland-Palatinate, Germany.

== Geography ==
The municipality lies in the Westerwald south of Montabaur in the Nassau Nature Park. The municipality belongs to the Verbandsgemeinde of Montabaur, a kind of collective municipality.

== History ==
In 1486, Horbach had its first documentary mention.

== Politics ==
=== municipality council ===
The council is made up of 12 council members who were elected in a majority vote in a municipal election on 13 June 2004.

=== Coat of arms ===
Horbach's location in the so-called Buchfinkenländchen is symbolized by the common chaffinch in the municipality's arms. The wavy bend stands for one of the headwater streams that builds the Daubach, which rises in Horbach. The heraldic lily refers to the name's meaning (horo = swamp), recalling as it does a kind of lily that grows in wetlands. The tinctures red and silver were the heraldic colours borne by the Electorate of Trier.

== Economy and infrastructure ==
The nearest Autobahn interchange is Montabaur on the A 3 (Cologne–Frankfurt) some 9 km away.
