= Ruppach-Goldhausen =

- Municipality
- Coat of arms

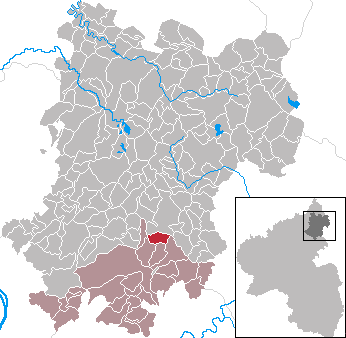
- Location of Ruppach-Goldhausen within Westerwaldkreis district
- Interactive map of Ruppach-Goldhausen
- Location within Germany Location within Rhineland-Palatinate
- Coordinates: 50°27′48″N 7°52′49″E
- Country: Germany
- State: Rhineland-Palatinate
- District: Westerwaldkreis
- Municipal assoc.: Montabaur

Government
  - Mayor (2019–24): Klaus Henkes

Area
  - Total: 4.41 km^{2} (1.70 sq mi)
- Elevation: 270 m (890 ft)

Population (2025-12-31)
  - Total: 1,218
  - Density: 276/km^{2} (715/sq mi)
- Time zone: UTC+01:00 (CET)
  - Summer (DST): UTC+02:00 (CEST)
- Postal codes: 56412
- Dialling codes: 02602
- Vehicle registration: WW
- Website: www.vg-montabaur.de

Ruppach-Goldhausen is an Ortsgemeinde – a community belonging to a Verbandsgemeinde – in the Westerwaldkreis in Rhineland-Palatinate, Germany.

== Geography ==
The community lies in the Westerwald north of Montabaur on the edge of the Nassau Nature Park. Through the community flows the Ahrbach. The community belongs to the Verbandsgemeinde of Montabaur, a kind of collective municipality. Its seat is in the like-named town.

== History ==
In 1289, Goldhausen had its first documentary mention as Golthusen.

The two communities of Ruppach and Goldhausen merged in 1969 in the course of administrative reform.

== Politics ==
=== Community council ===
The council is made up of 16 council members who were elected in a majority vote in a municipal election on 7 June 2009.

=== Coat of arms ===
The upper part of the community's arms represent the union of the coats of arms borne by the Lords of Reifenberg and the nobles of Nassau-Spurkenburg. Serving as the model for the arms’ design was the former court seal of Ruppach from 1596. The step-shaped lower part of the arms symbolizes clay quarrying and the wavy fess stands for the Ahrbach.

== Economy and infrastructure ==
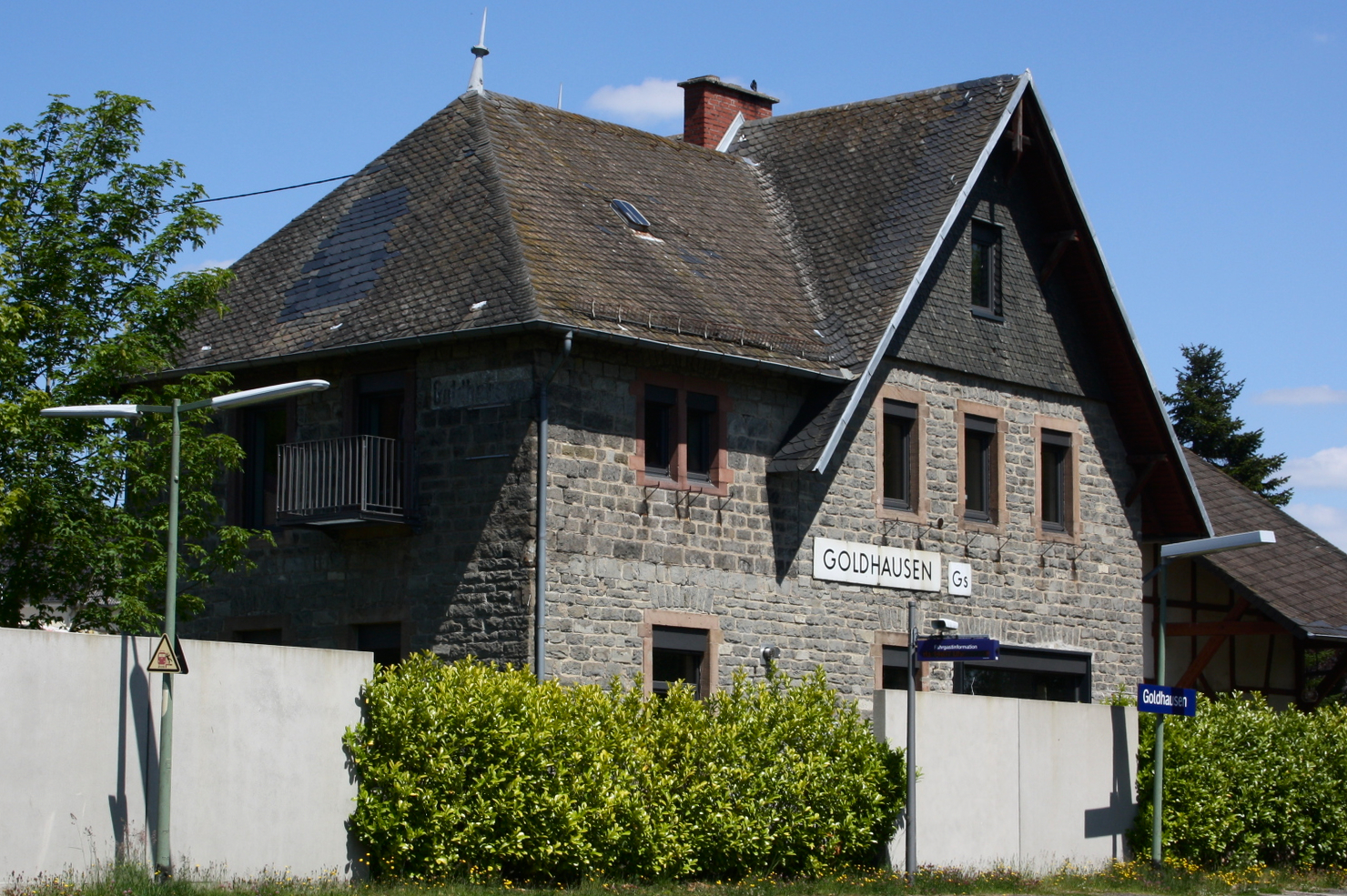
Ruppach-Goldhausen train station

The nearest Autobahn interchange is Montabaur on the A 3 (Cologne–Frankfurt), some 3 km away. The nearest InterCityExpress stops are Montabaur station on the Cologne-Frankfurt high-speed rail line and Koblenz on the Rechte Rheinstrecke. Goldhausen has a station on the Lower Westerwald Railway Unterwesterwaldbahn from Limburg to Siershahn, operated by DreiLänderBahn, a section of Hessische Landesbahn (HLB). The village is located in the area of the transport association Verkehrsverbund Rhein-Mosel (VRM), fare zone number 411.
