= Sporkenburg =

- Eitelborn
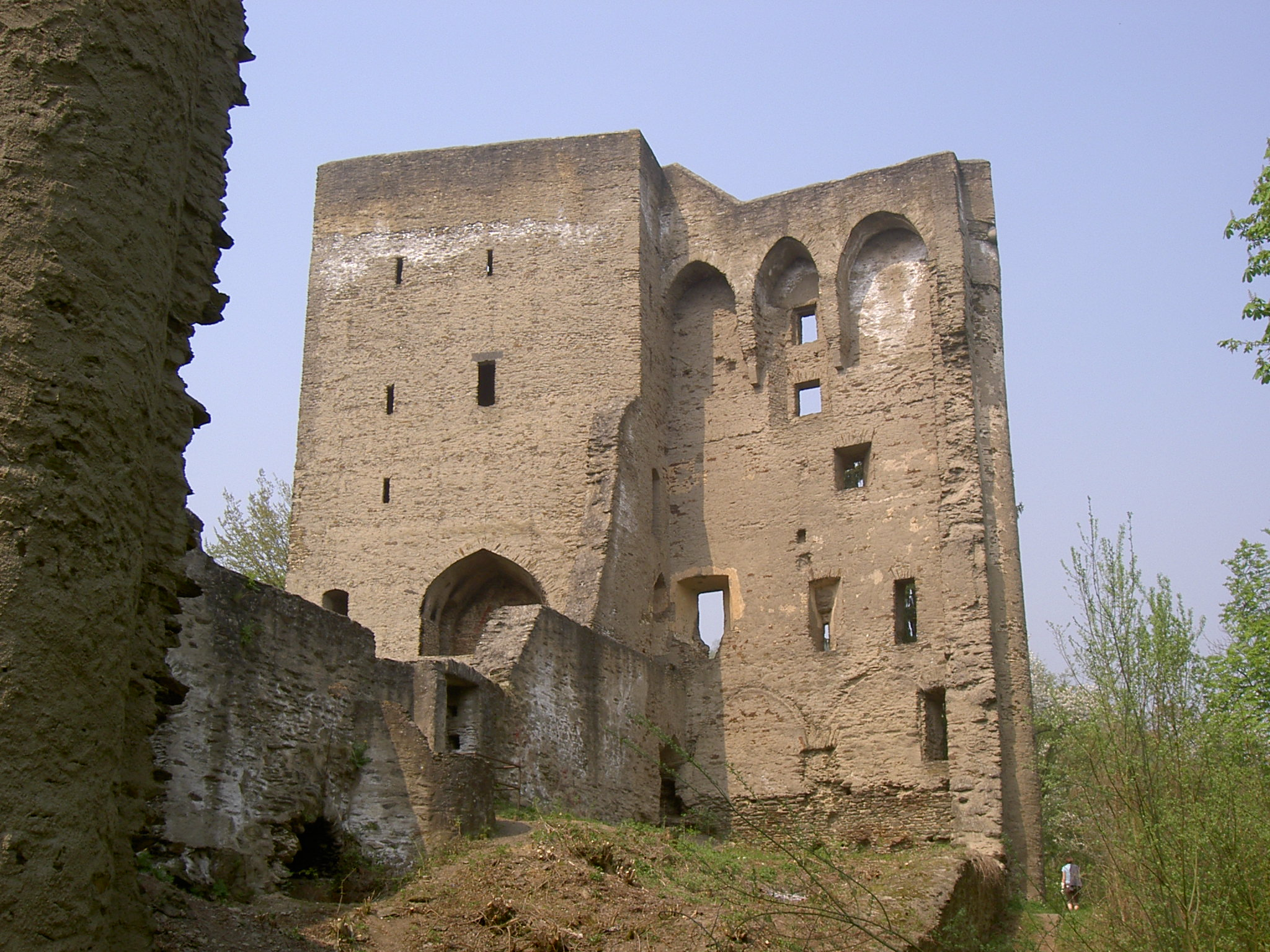
- The Sporkenburg in April 2009

Site information
- Type: hill castle, spur castle
- Code: DE-RP
- Condition: ruin

Location
- Coordinates: 50°22′01″N 7°43′43″E

Site history
- Built: 1310

Garrison information
- Occupants: Ministeriales

The Sporkenburg is a late medieval castle ruin about one kilometre south of Eitelborn in the district of Westerwaldkreis in the German state of Rhineland-Palatinate.

== Location ==
The ruins of the spur castle lie within the parish of the village of Eitelborn in the Westerwald hills above the L 329 between Bad Ems and Arzbach. Located in the middle of the forest, the Sporkenburg is not easy to find. The easiest option is to follow the signs along the castle path (Burgweg) into the woods from the eastern exit of the village of Eitelborn aus (Erlenweg, near the cemetery). Pass through the barrier and take the right hand path from the crosstracks which leads gently downhill. Alternatively take the ascent from the L 329 from where the castle can be seen above the valley. The ruins are not managed and are freely accessible at any time.

== Layout ==
The tower castle (Turmburg) is located on a roughly rectangular hill spur above the stream of Emsbach. The spur drops steeply away to the west, south and east. To the north the castle is protected by a length of ditch (Halsgraben). The outermost defences and the ward between the two curtain walls, the Zwinger, have almost completely disappeared.

The inner ward (Kernburg) is 35 metres long by 18 metres wide. It does not have a bergfried. On the north side the castle has a five-storey, slightly angled shield wall, reinforced with bartizans, that has a height of almost 20 metres. In the western section of the shield wall is the entrance to the inner ward. On the south side of the heavily built-up inner ward is the Palas with its Great Hall, whose outside walls have survived. The eastern part of the inner ward has been completely removed.

== History ==
The Lower Engersgau was probably enfeoffed to the lords of the Electorate of Trier under Archbishop Poppo (1016–1047). From this estate, Archbishop Engelbert (1079–1101) gifted the village of Dezerhaid to the Benedictine Abbey of St. Matthew. In the late 13th century the settlement is recorded as a fief in the possession of Emmerich of Andernach and Henry of Lahnstein. They began work on constructing a castle. The castle was destroyed, however, by Count Otto of Nassau, the advocate (Vogt) of Kurtrier. Whereupon Henry of Lahnstein transferred his rights to Dezerhaid to Henry II of Helfenstein.

Henry II of Helfenstein had the Sporkenburg rebuilt, probably not on the old site, in the year 1310. He assigned it to the Archbishop of Trier Baldwin (1307–1354) as a fief. The castle developed into the centre of the lordship of Helfenstein-Sporkenburg.

In 1515 John of Helfenstein sold the castle to John and Quyrin of Nassau (not to be confused with the counts of Nassau). In the deed the castle was described as vast buwefellig ("almost ruined"). In 1604 the castle went from the lords of Nassau to the von Metternich family. It was destroyed in 1635 by the French during the Thirty Years' War.

State chancellor Prince of Metternich sold the ruins in 1811. Its ownership transferred in 1900 to Prussia and in 1948 to Rhineland-Palatinate. In 1967 the State Office for Cultural Heritage began a gradual restoration of the remaining remnants of the walls.

== Literature ==
- Alexander Thon, Stefan Ulrich, Jens Friedhoff: „Mit starken eisernen Ketten und Riegeln beschlossen ...“. Burgen an der Lahn. Schnell & Steiner, Regensburg 2008, ISBN 978-3-7954-2000-0, p. 154-159.
