= Welschneudorf =

- Municipality
- Coat of arms

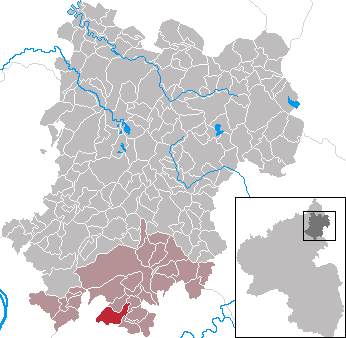
- Location of Welschneudorf within Westerwaldkreis district
- Interactive map of Welschneudorf
- Location within Germany Location within Rhineland-Palatinate
- Coordinates: 50°22′24″N 7°47′53″E
- Country: Germany
- State: Rhineland-Palatinate
- District: Westerwaldkreis
- Municipal assoc.: Montabaur

Government
  - Mayor (2019–24): Günther Perlick

Area
  - Total: 7.77 km^{2} (3.00 sq mi)
- Elevation: 415 m (1,362 ft)

Population (2025-12-31)
  - Total: 973
  - Density: 125/km^{2} (324/sq mi)
- Time zone: UTC+01:00 (CET)
  - Summer (DST): UTC+02:00 (CEST)
- Postal codes: 56412
- Dialling codes: 02608
- Vehicle registration: WW
- Website: www.vg-montabaur.de

Welschneudorf is an Ortsgemeinde – a community belonging to a Verbandsgemeinde – and a Luftkurort (“air health resort”) in the Westerwaldkreis in Rhineland-Palatinate, Germany.

== Geography ==
The community lies in the Lower Westerwald between Koblenz and Limburg an der Lahn in the Nassau Nature Park. Verbandsgemeinde of Montabaur, a kind of collective municipality. Its seat is in the like-named town.

== History ==
In 1453, Welschneudorf had its first documentary mention as Nudorff. In 1817, it was burnt down by advancing French troops.

== Politics ==
The municipal council is made up of 16 council members who were elected in a majority vote in a municipal election on 13 June 2004.

== Economy and infrastructure ==
The nearest Autobahn interchange is Montabaur on the A 3 (Cologne–Frankfurt), some 11 km away. The nearest InterCityExpress stops are the railway stations at Montabaur on the Cologne-Frankfurt high-speed rail line and Koblenz on the Linke Rheinstrecke.
