= Görgeshausen =

- Municipality
- Coat of arms

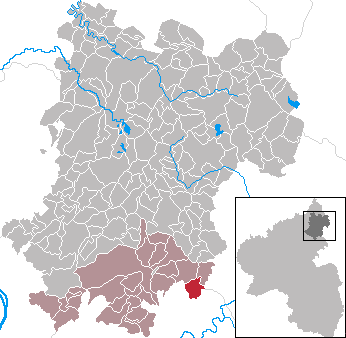
- Location of Görgeshausen within Westerwaldkreis district
- Interactive map of Görgeshausen
- Location within Germany Location within Rhineland-Palatinate
- Coordinates: 50°24′39″N 7°57′22″E
- Country: Germany
- State: Rhineland-Palatinate
- District: Westerwaldkreis
- Municipal assoc.: Montabaur

Government
  - Mayor (2019–24): Jürgen Kindler

Area
  - Total: 3.24 km^{2} (1.25 sq mi)
- Elevation: 283 m (928 ft)

Population (2025-12-31)
  - Total: 971
  - Density: 300/km^{2} (776/sq mi)
- Time zone: UTC+01:00 (CET)
  - Summer (DST): UTC+02:00 (CEST)
- Postal codes: 56412
- Dialling codes: 06485
- Vehicle registration: WW
- Website: www.vg-montabaur.de

Görgeshausen is an Ortsgemeinde – a community belonging to a Verbandsgemeinde – in the Westerwaldkreis in Rhineland-Palatinate, Germany.

== Geography ==
The community lies in the Westerwald between Koblenz and Gießen on the edge of the Nassau Nature Park, and borders on Hesse. The community belongs to the Verbandsgemeinde of Montabaur, a kind of collective municipality.

== History ==
In 1290, Görgeshausen had its first documentary mention as Gerinzhausen.

== Politics ==
=== Community council ===
The council is made up of 12 council members who were elected in a majority vote in a municipal election on 7 June 2009.

=== Coat of arms ===
The middle part of the community's arms symbolizes the so-called Löwenstein (“Lion’s Stone”), a border stone that once marked the boundary between Görgeshausen, which was then held by the Electorate of Trier, and the area belonging then to Nassau-Diez. The two linden twigs refer to the linden tree that formerly stood on the church hill in the middle of the village.

== Sport ==
There is a sport club called Grün Weiß Görgeshausen. The name means “Green White”.

== Economy and infrastructure ==
The public local bus lines 450 and 575 connect the village to the public transport It is located in the zone number 409 of the transport association Verkehrsverbund Rhein-Mosel (VRM).

The nearest Autobahn interchange is Diez on the A 3 (Cologne–Frankfurt) about a kilometre away, the nearest train stop is in Niedererbach at the Lower Westerwald railway (RB29).

=== Energy production ===
A solar park is located in the area of Görgeshausen.

The wind farm next to the Elzer Beeg is located on the ground.of Elz in Hesse, but directly neighboring Görgeshausen.
