= Heilberscheid =

- Municipality
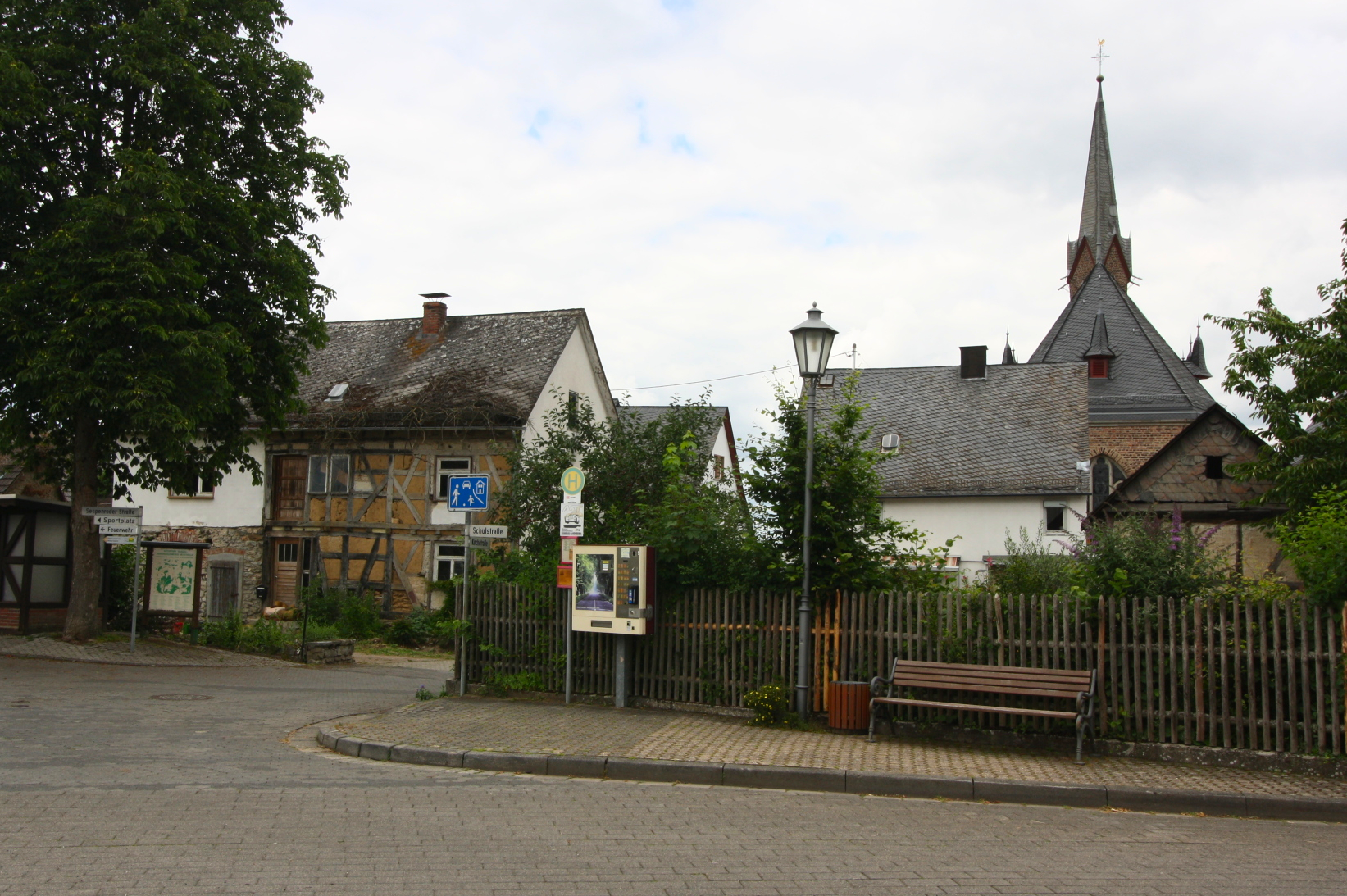

- Coat of arms

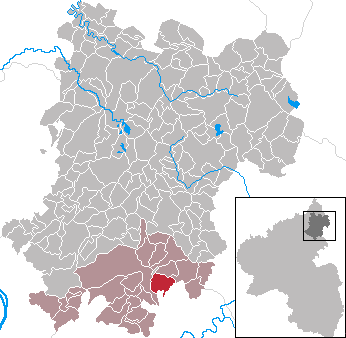
- Location of Heilberscheid within Westerwaldkreis district
- Interactive map of Heilberscheid
- Location within Germany Location within Rhineland-Palatinate
- Coordinates: 50°24′44″N 7°53′34″E
- Country: Germany
- State: Rhineland-Palatinate
- District: Westerwaldkreis
- Municipal assoc.: Montabaur

Government
  - Mayor (2019–24): Markus Thome

Area
  - Total: 6.37 km^{2} (2.46 sq mi)
- Elevation: 310 m (1,020 ft)

Population (2025-12-31)
  - Total: 641
  - Density: 101/km^{2} (261/sq mi)
- Time zone: UTC+01:00 (CET)
  - Summer (DST): UTC+02:00 (CEST)
- Postal codes: 56412
- Dialling codes: 06485
- Vehicle registration: WW
- Website: www.vg-montabaur.de

Heilberscheid is an Ortsgemeinde – a community belonging to a Verbandsgemeinde – in the Westerwaldkreis in Rhineland-Palatinate, Germany.

== Geography ==
The community lies in the Westerwald between Koblenz and Limburg an der Lahn in the Nassau Nature Park. The community belongs to the Verbandsgemeinde of Montabaur, a kind of collective municipality.

== History ==
In 1362, Heilberscheid had its first documentary mention.

== Politics ==
=== Community council ===
The council is made up of 12 council members who were elected in a majority vote in a municipal election on 7 June 2009.

=== Coat of arms ===
The community's arms show a Madonna in the middle in a grotto with a model of Heilberscheid's Marienkappelle (built 1889-1891). The hornbeam twigs refer to the widespread hornbeams that grow in the Heilberscheid Forest. The background tinctures, red and silver, are from the arms borne by the Electorate of Trier.

== Economy and infrastructure ==
The village Heilberscheid is connected to the public local bus line 450 and located in the area of the transport association Verkehrsverbund Rhein-Mosel (VRM), in the zone number 408.

Nearest train stop is Niedererbach.

The nearest Autobahn interchange is Diez on the A 3 (Cologne–Frankfurt), some 5 km away.
