= Großholbach =

- Municipality
- Coat of arms

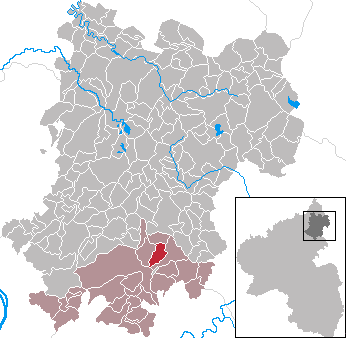
- Location of Großholbach within Westerwaldkreis district
- Interactive map of Großholbach
- Location within Germany Location within Rhineland-Palatinate
- Coordinates: 50°26′50″N 7°53′36″E
- Country: Germany
- State: Rhineland-Palatinate
- District: Westerwaldkreis
- Municipal assoc.: Montabaur

Government
  - Mayor (2019–24): Heike Hannappel

Area
  - Total: 3.91 km^{2} (1.51 sq mi)
- Elevation: 267 m (876 ft)

Population (2025-12-31)
  - Total: 972
  - Density: 249/km^{2} (644/sq mi)
- Time zone: UTC+01:00 (CET)
  - Summer (DST): UTC+02:00 (CEST)
- Postal codes: 56412
- Dialling codes: 02602
- Vehicle registration: WW
- Website: www.vg-montabaur.de

Großholbach (or Grossholbach) is an Ortsgemeinde – a community belonging to a Verbandsgemeinde – in the Westerwaldkreis in Rhineland-Palatinate, Germany.

== Geography ==
The community lies in the Westerwald between Koblenz and Gießen on the edge of the Nassau Nature Park. Through Großholbach runs the Holbach, which empties into the Gelbach. The community belongs to the Verbandsgemeinde of Montabaur, a kind of collective municipality.

== History ==
In 1200, Großholbach had its first documentary mention. In 1738, the parish church was newly built, and in 1823 came the first school. The volunteer fire brigade was officially founded in 1958 and later, in 1972, so was the youth fire brigade. In 1984, the community's arms were introduced.

== Politics ==
=== Community council ===
The council is made up of 12 council members who were elected in a majority vote in a municipal election on 7 June 2009.

=== Coat of arms ===
Since 1984, the community has borne its own arms. They might heraldically be described thus: Party per bend wavy sinister, argent an oakleaf and twig vert, vert a sword Or per bend sinister.

The wavy parting is meant to stand for the Holbach, a brook that runs through the municipal area. The oakleaf stands for the Bildches Eich, a memorial consecrated to Mary and a village landmark. The golden sword symbolizes community patron Saint Sebastian’s martyrdom. The green background here stands for the wealth of woodland.

== Economy and infrastructure ==
The nearest train stops are in Girod and Ruppach-Goldhausen at the Lower Westerwald railway (RB29). The village is also served by the local bus line 450 and located in the area of the transport association Verkehrsverbund Rhein-Mosel (VRM), in the zone 411.

The nearest Autobahn interchanges are Montabaur and Diez on the A 3 (Cologne–Frankfurt), each some 5 km away.
