= Holler, Germany =

Holler
- Municipality
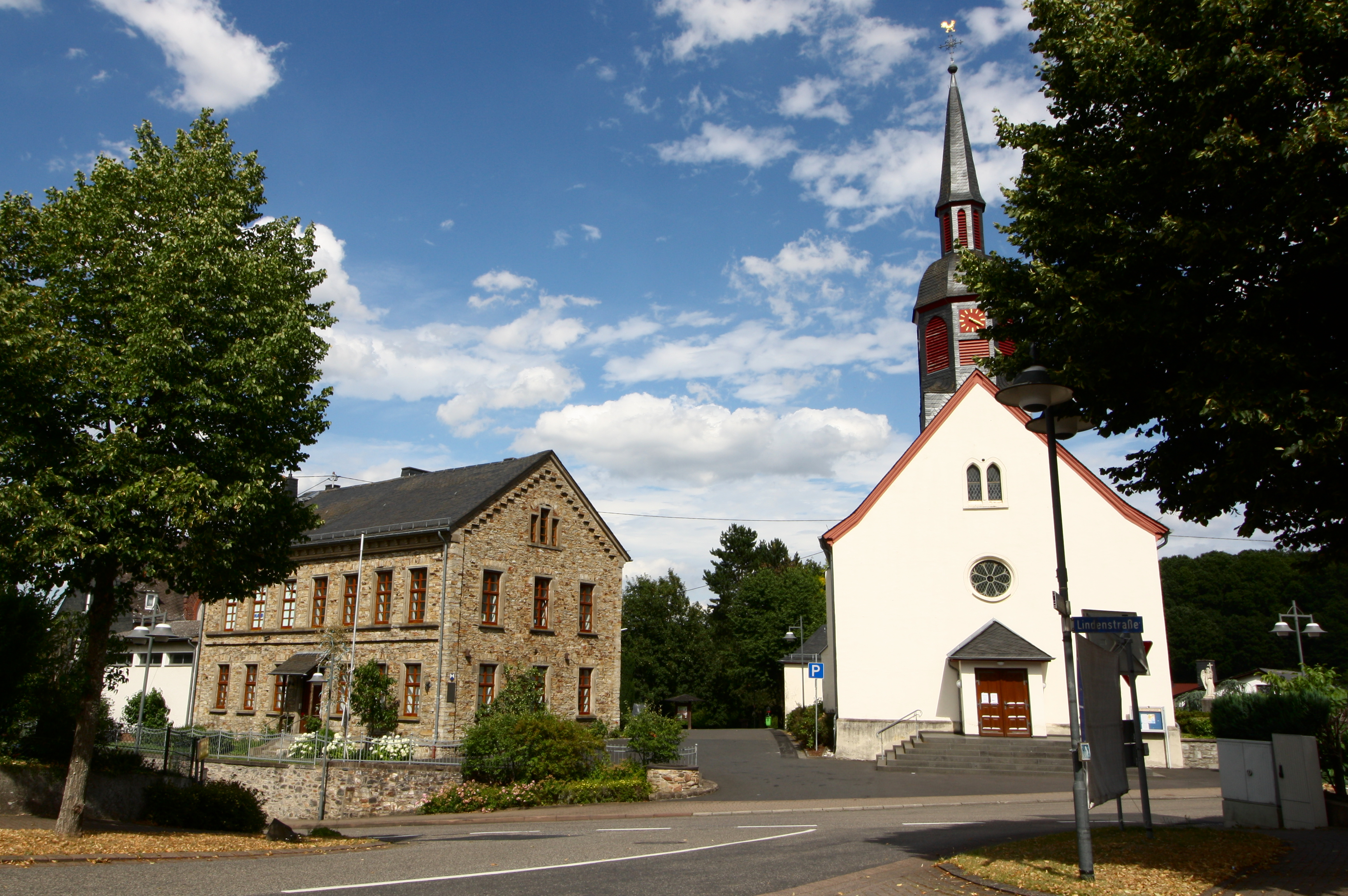

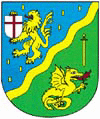
- Coat of arms

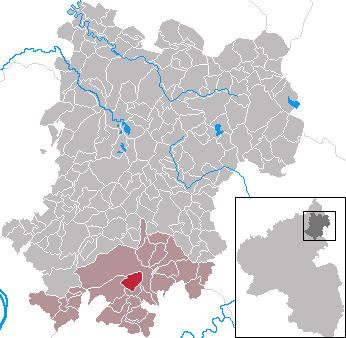
- Location of Holler within Westerwaldkreis district
- Interactive map of Holler
- Location within Germany Location within Rhineland-Palatinate
- Coordinates: 50°24′45″N 7°50′06″E
- Country: Germany
- State: Rhineland-Palatinate
- District: Westerwaldkreis
- Municipal assoc.: Montabaur

Government
  - Mayor (2019–24): Uwe Meyer

Area
  - Total: 4.53 km^{2} (1.75 sq mi)
- Elevation: 255 m (837 ft)

Population (2025-12-31)
  - Total: 1,005
  - Density: 222/km^{2} (575/sq mi)
- Time zone: UTC+01:00 (CET)
  - Summer (DST): UTC+02:00 (CEST)
- Postal codes: 56412
- Dialling codes: 02602
- Vehicle registration: WW
- Website: www.vg-montabaur.de

Holler (German pronunciation: [ˈhɔlɐ]) is an Ortsgemeinde – a municipality belonging to a Verbandsgemeinde – in the Westerwaldkreis in Rhineland-Palatinate, Germany.

== Geography ==
The municipality lies in the Westerwald south of Montabaur in the Nassau Nature Park. The municipality belongs to the Verbandsgemeinde of Montabaur, a kind of collective municipality.

== History ==
In 1228, Holler had its first documentary mention in the Eberbach Monastery's Oculus Memoriae.

== Politics ==
=== municipality council ===
The council is made up of 17 council members, including the extraofficial mayor (Bürgermeister), who were elected in a municipal election on 13 June 2004.

- Wählergruppe Flosdorf 9 seats
- Wählergruppe Metternich 7 seats

=== Coat of arms ===
The municipality's arms symbolize Holler's territorial allegiances over time. The golden lion stands for the Duchy of Nassau, and the inescutcheon in the lion's paws stands for the Electorate of Trier. The wavy bend sinister evokes the wealth in water that the municipality boasts, and the mills. The green in the arms refers to agriculture and the woods. The former branch parishes are represented by the seven billets (little rectangles), and the church's patron, Saint Margaret, is represented by the golden dragon with the sword.

== Economy and infrastructure ==
=== Transport ===
The nearest Autobahn interchange is Montabaur on the A 3 (Cologne–Frankfurt), some 4 km away.

=== Fire brigade ===
The Holler Volunteer Fire Brigade was founded on 29 March 1925, and it likewise ensures firefighting and general aid in the Ortsgemeinden of Daubach, Stahlhofen and Untershausen. The brigade's fleet includes a command unit (Einsatzleitwagen, ELW 1) and a small fire engine (Tragkraftspritzenfahrzeug, TSF). The ELW 1 belongs to the district and does duty both in this municipality and others. The brigade's current staff numbers 20 firefighters.
