= Nomborn =

- Municipality
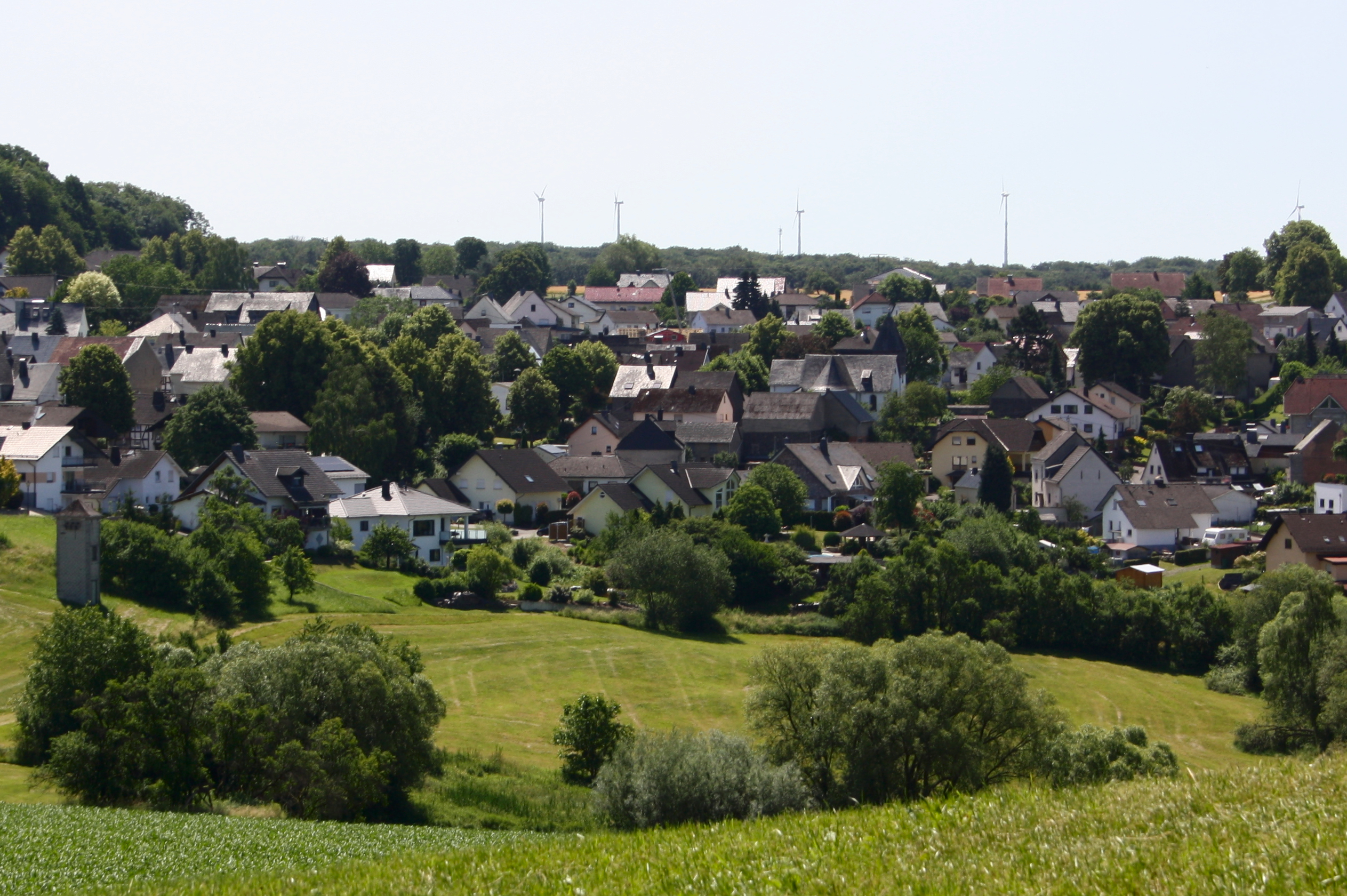

- Coat of arms

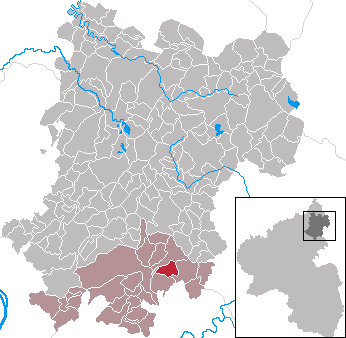
- Location of Nomborn within Westerwaldkreis district
- Interactive map of Nomborn
- Location within Germany Location within Rhineland-Palatinate
- Coordinates: 50°25′46″N 7°54′53″E
- Country: Germany
- State: Rhineland-Palatinate
- District: Westerwaldkreis
- Municipal assoc.: Montabaur

Government
  - Mayor (2019–24): Patrick Brach

Area
  - Total: 4.00 km^{2} (1.54 sq mi)
- Elevation: 290 m (950 ft)

Population (2025-12-31)
  - Total: 650
  - Density: 160/km^{2} (420/sq mi)
- Time zone: UTC+01:00 (CET)
  - Summer (DST): UTC+02:00 (CEST)
- Postal codes: 56412
- Dialling codes: 06485
- Vehicle registration: WW
- Website: www.nomborn.de

Nomborn is an Ortsgemeinde – a community belonging to a Verbandsgemeinde – in the Westerwaldkreis in Rhineland-Palatinate, Germany.

== Geography ==
The community lies in the Westerwald between Montabaur and Limburg an der Lahn on the edge of the Nassau Nature Park. Through the community flows the Eisenbach. The community belongs to the Verbandsgemeinde of Montabaur, a kind of collective municipality. Its seat is in the like-named town.

== History ==
In 1289, Nomborn had its first documentary mention as Numburne.

== Politics ==
=== Community council ===
The council is made up of 13 council members, including the extraofficial mayor (Bürgermeister), who were elected in a municipal election on 13 June 2004.

	Wählergruppe Hübinger	Wählergruppe Frink	Total
2004	7	5	12 seats

=== Coat of arms ===
The community's arms show a stylized representation of Saint Kilian’s Church above. The seven hexagons symbolize the basalt columns found in the area around the Hausberg Bornkasten. Below, the former drinking water supply is symbolized as a well. The wavy bendlet stands for the Eisenbach, which flows through the community.

== Economy and infrastructure ==
The nearest Autobahn interchange is Diez on the A 3 (Cologne–Frankfurt), some 3 km away. The nearest train stop is in Girod at the Lower Westerwald railway (RB29). The local bus line 450 (Limburg - Diez - Monatabaur serves the village. Marked hiking paths are around the community. Nentershausen is located in the area of the local transport association Verkehrsverbund Rhein-Mosel (VRM), zone number 409. The nearest long distance train stops are the railway stations at Limburg and Montabaur, each 12 km away, on the Cologne-Frankfurt high-speed rail line, and Koblenz on the Rechte Rheinstrecke, some 40 km away.
