= Daubach, Westerwaldkreis =

Daubach
- Municipality
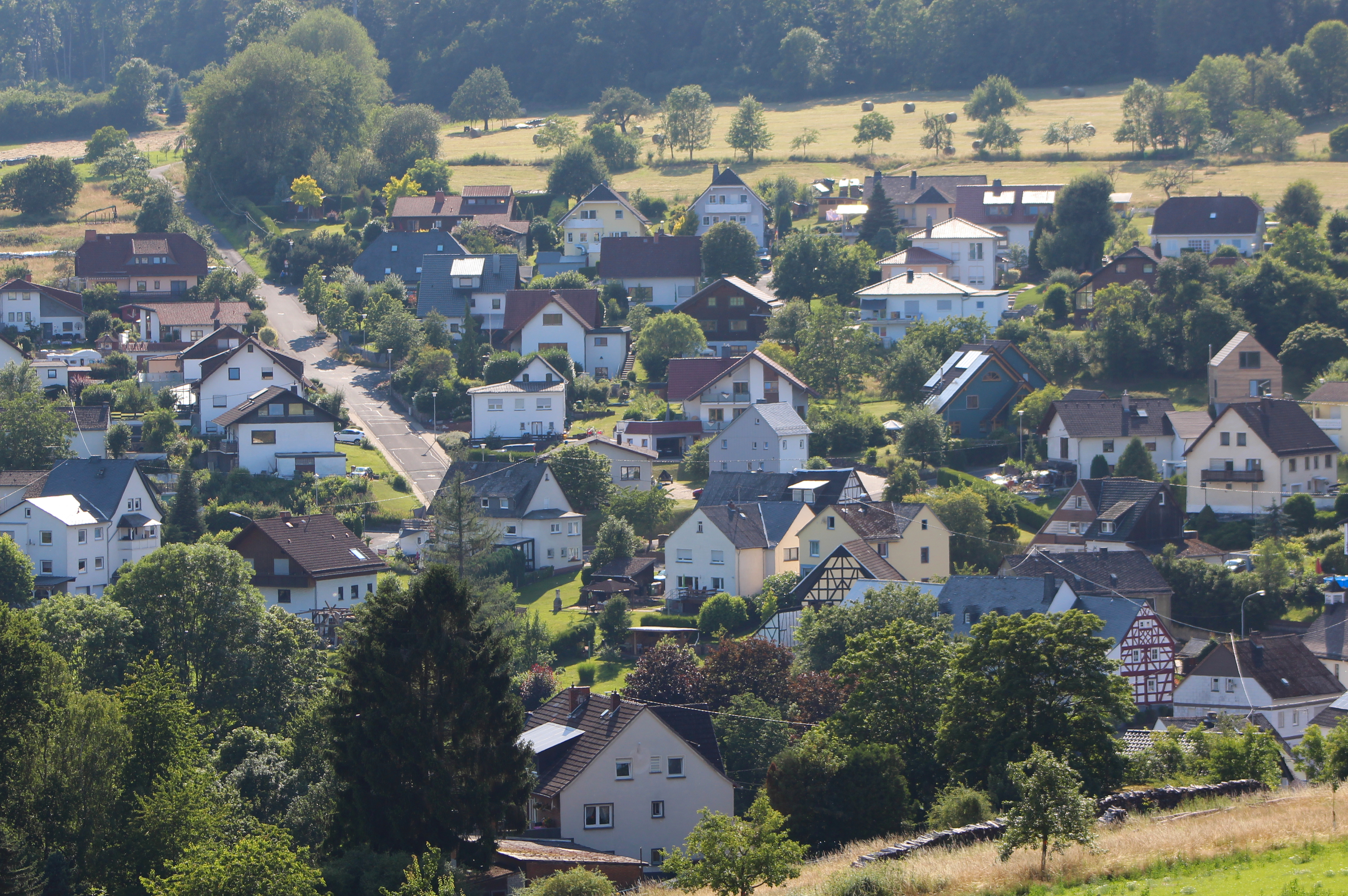

- Coat of arms

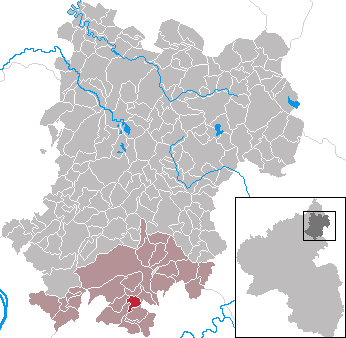
- Location of Daubach within Westerwaldkreis district
- Interactive map of Daubach
- Location within Germany Location within Rhineland-Palatinate
- Coordinates: 50°23′28″N 7°50′53″E
- Country: Germany
- State: Rhineland-Palatinate
- District: Westerwaldkreis
- Municipal assoc.: Montabaur

Government
  - Mayor (2019–24): Thorsten Hahn

Area
  - Total: 2.51 km^{2} (0.97 sq mi)
- Elevation: 298 m (978 ft)

Population (2025-12-31)
  - Total: 487
  - Density: 194/km^{2} (503/sq mi)
- Time zone: UTC+01:00 (CET)
  - Summer (DST): UTC+02:00 (CEST)
- Postal codes: 56412
- Dialling codes: 02602
- Vehicle registration: WW
- Website: www.vg-montabaur.de

Daubach (German pronunciation: [ˈdaʊbax]) is an Ortsgemeinde – a municipality belonging to a Verbandsgemeinde – in the Westerwaldkreis in Rhineland-Palatinate, Germany. It belongs to the Verbandsgemeinde of Montabaur, a kind of collective municipality.

== Geography ==
The municipality lies west of Bundesautobahn 3, five kilometres from Montabaur, to the lee of the Stelzenbach Forest, above the Gelbach Valley and only seven kilometres from the Lahn Valley with its episcopal town, Limburg an der Lahn.

== History ==
In 1343, Daubach had its first documentary mention. Daubach is nowadays a residential municipality without any established industry. The grocer's shop closed in 2000. The building of the municipality's own chapel in the 1990s may be described as a highlight.

== Politics ==
=== municipality council ===
The council is made up of 8 council members who were elected in a majority vote in a municipal election on 7 June 2009.

=== Coat of arms ===
The approval for the municipality to bear its own arms was granted on 14 April 1981 by the government assistant.
