= Niedererbach =

- Municipality
- Coat of arms

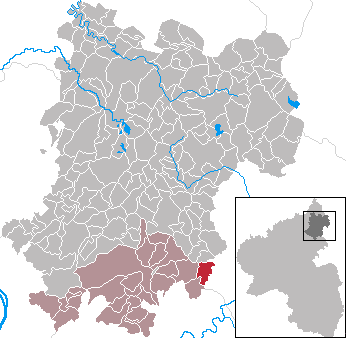
- Location of Niedererbach within Westerwaldkreis district
- Interactive map of Niedererbach
- Location within Germany Location within Rhineland-Palatinate
- Coordinates: 50°25′38″N 7°58′31″E
- Country: Germany
- State: Rhineland-Palatinate
- District: Westerwaldkreis
- Municipal assoc.: Montabaur

Government
  - Mayor (since 2023): Andreas Neubert

Area
  - Total: 4.43 km^{2} (1.71 sq mi)
- Elevation: 160–200 m (520–660 ft)

Population (2025-12-31)
  - Total: 1,045
  - Density: 236/km^{2} (611/sq mi)
- Time zone: UTC+01:00 (CET)
  - Summer (DST): UTC+02:00 (CEST)
- Postal codes: 56412
- Dialling codes: 06485
- Vehicle registration: WW
- Website: www.niedererbach.de

Niedererbach is an Ortsgemeinde – a community belonging to a Verbandsgemeinde – in the Westerwaldkreis in Rhineland-Palatinate, Germany.

== Geography ==
=== Location ===
The community lies in the Westerwald between Koblenz and Limburg an der Lahn on the edge of the Nassau Nature Park on the boundary with Hesse. It belongs to the Verbandsgemeinde of Montabaur, a kind of collective municipality. Its seat is in the like-named town.

=== Neighbouring communities ===
Niedererbach's neighbours are Obererbach, Westerwaldkreis, Dreikirchen, Nentershausen, Görgeshausen and Elz, Hesse.

== History ==
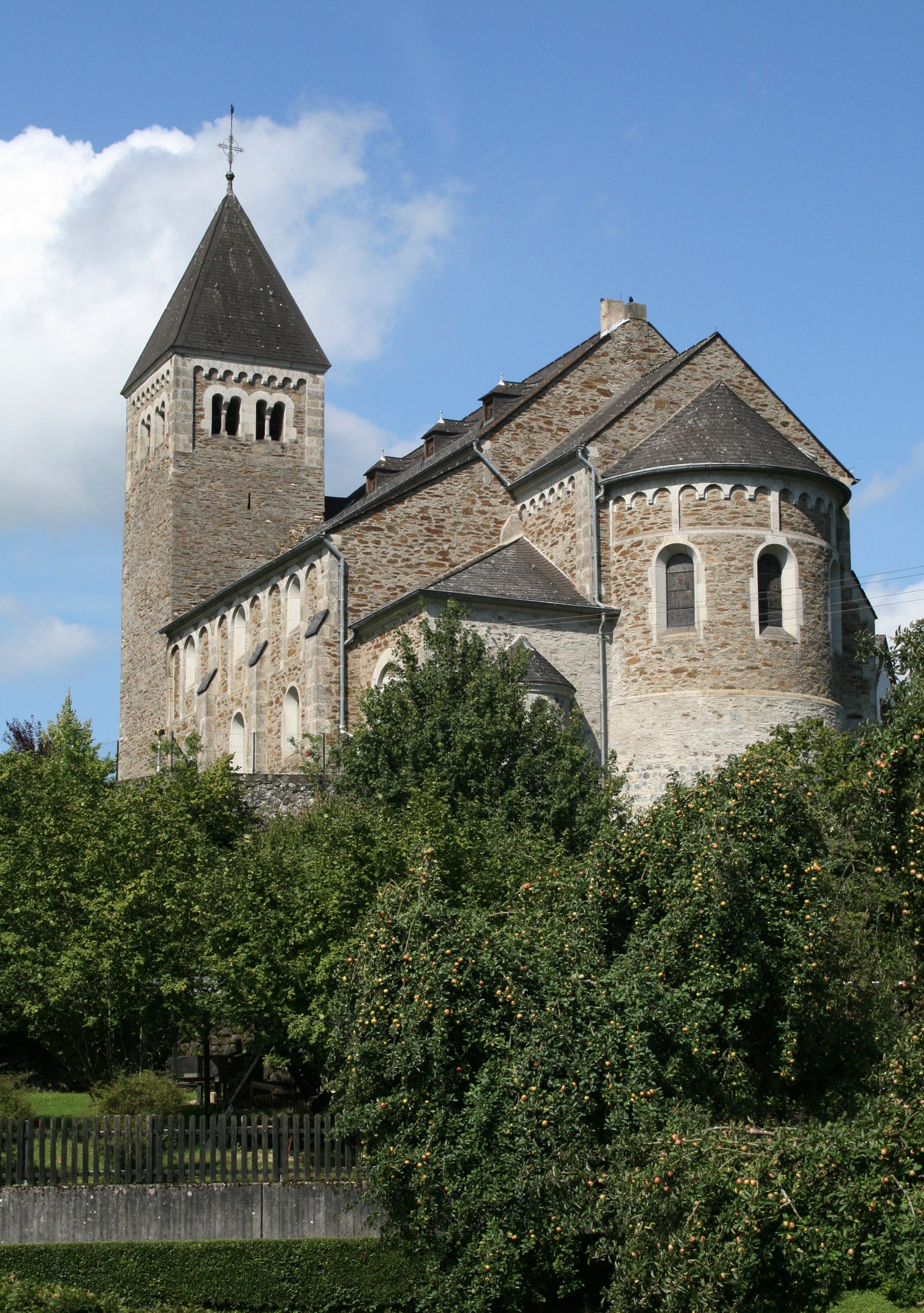
Niedererbach parish church

In 1291, Niedererbach had its first documentary mention as Erlebach. The document is dated 12 May 1291. In the document a pastor named Friedrich and the parish of Erlebach are mentioned which document a legal transaction with the commander and the Teutonic Knights in Koblenz. The original is kept at the Central Archive of the Teutonic Knights in Vienna. Since 2006, the community of Niedererbach has been in possession of a copy of the document.

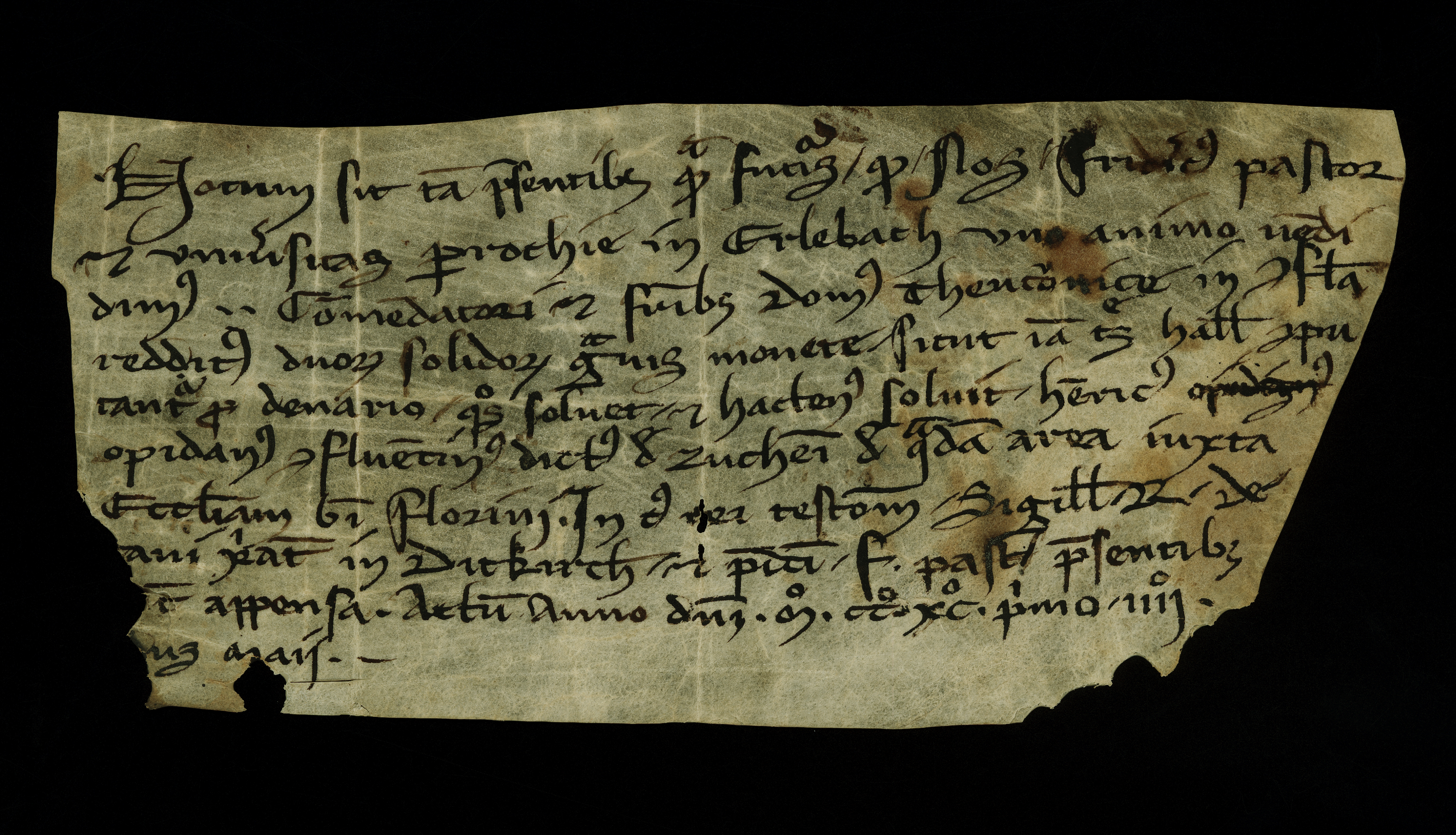
Niedererbach's first documentary mention 12 May 1291

In 2006 the community celebrated one of the biggest festivals since its beginnings, the one hundredth Kirmes. This most important of village festivals is held each year on the last weekend in August and recalls the consecration of the parish church of St. Katharina in 1906. One part of the tower is considerably older and may come from the time about AD 1200. Before today's church stood here, there was on the same spot a Baroque church built in 1725, about the size of the side nave today. This old church was torn down in 1904, although the tower was left standing. Only the uppermost third was torn down and renewed. In September 1904, excavation work began for the new parish church. On 14 May 1905, the first stone was laid and on 10 August 1905, the topping-out ceremony was held. The framework was completed in December 1905. In May 1906 began the plastering, the window fitting and the interior decoration. On 19 August 1906, the new church building was ceremonially blessed by Bishop Dominikus Willi

Since Niedererbachers were once known for making little whistles from willow twigs, they are sometimes still known as Erwocher Peifscher today.

== Politics ==
=== Community council ===
The council is made up of 12 council members who were elected in a municipal election on 28 May 2014. In the last direct vote for mayor (Ortsbürgermeister), held on the same day, Gerhard Theis was elected to office as the only candidate for a further four years.

=== Coat of arms ===
The sword and breaking wheel in the community's arms are symbols of the parish church's patronage, namely Saint Catherine (the wheel is also known as a Catherine wheel). The alder sprig refers to the community's name (Erbach = Erlenbach). The wavy parting per pale stands for the community's charming rural location in the Erbach valley. As a token of the former allegiance to the Electorate of Trier, that territory's tinctures have been incorporated into the civic arms.

== Culture and sightseeing ==
=== Theatre ===
- theaterfreunde niedererbach 1976 e.V.

=== Fire brigade ===
- Freiwillige Feuerwehr Niedererbach (volunteer fire brigade)

=== Music ===
- CHORamel (formerly Junger Chor) Niedererbach (choir)
- Chorgemeinschaft “Cäcilia-St.Katharina” (choir association)

=== Sport ===
- Sportverein Niedererbach 1920 e.V. (sport club)
- Schützenverein Niedererbach 1978 e. V. (shooting club; disciplines: air rifle, air pistol, sport bow)
- Trimm-Treff Niedererbach (fitness)

=== Culture and Local Customs ===
These are clubs that make it their business to improve or promote the community:

- Verschönerungsverein Niedererbach e.V. (beautification)
- Förderverein "Unser Dorf hat Zukunft" 2006 e.V. (promotion)
- Förderverein zur Traditions- und Brauchtumspflege Niedererbach 2010 e. V. (promotion)

=== Buildings ===
- St.Katharina parish church
- Railway viaduct
- Historic slate gallery
- “Alter Sportplatz” open-air stage

=== Natural monuments ===
- "Gaasekippel" slate mountain
- Graveyard linden

=== Regular events ===
- Kermis (last weekend in August whose Sunday is also in August)
- Ostereierschießen, shooting club (“Easter Egg Shoot”, Sunday before Easter)
- Maiwanderung, beautification club (1 May)
- Dorfpokalschießen, shooting club (“Cup Shoot”, 3 October)

== Economy and infrastructure ==
=== Transport ===
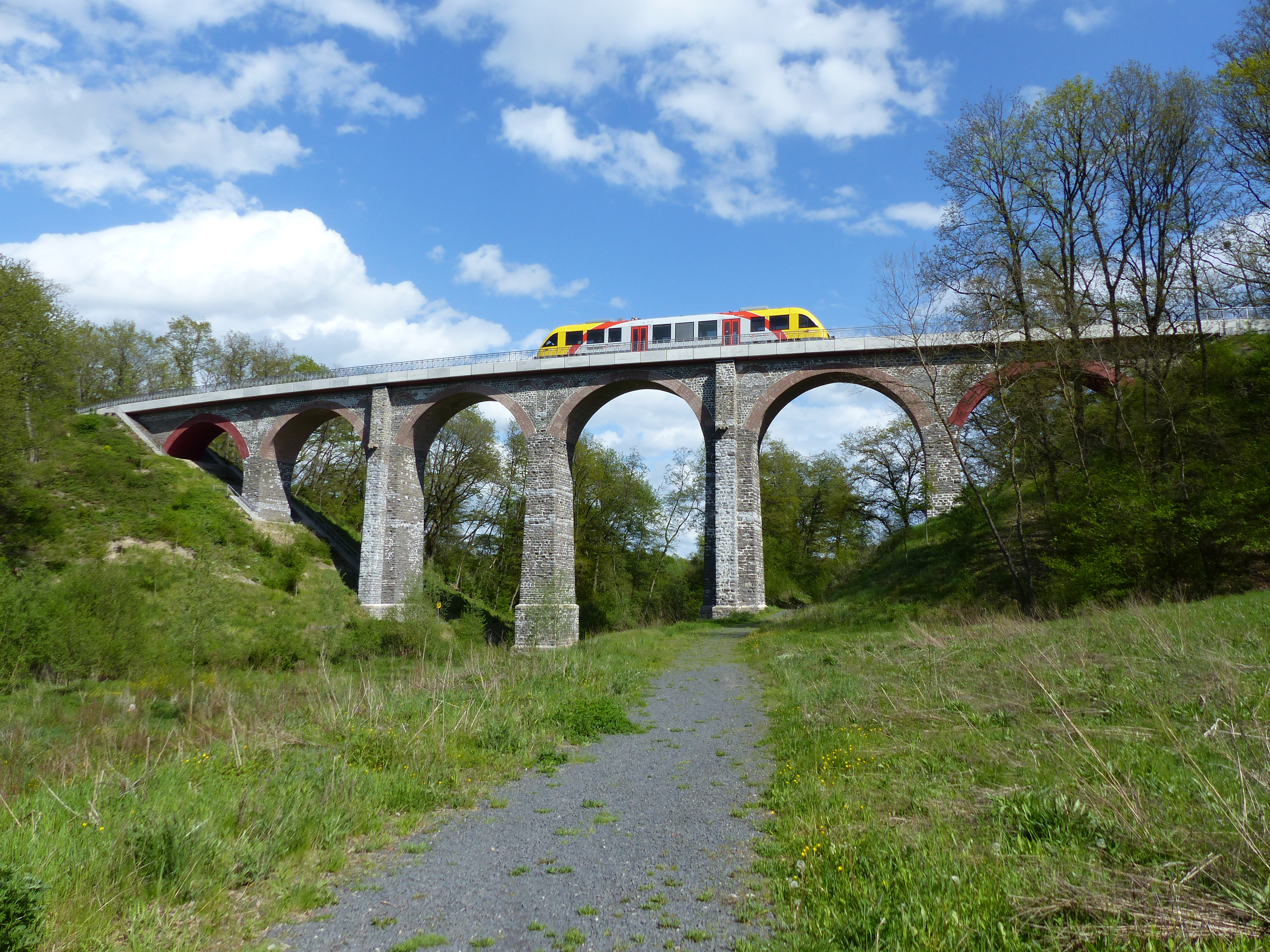
Sandbachtal bridge of Lower Westerwald Railway in Niedererbach

The nearest Autobahn interchange is Diez - Nentershausen on the A 3 (Cologne–Frankfurt), some 3 km away. The nearest InterCityExpress stops are at Limburg Süd station and Montabaur station on the Cologne-Frankfurt high-speed rail line, each 13 km away, as well as Koblenz on the Rechte Rheinstrecke. Niedererbach itself has a halt on the Limburg-Siershahn line (Lower Westerwald Railway, Unterwesterwaldbahn) of DreiLänderBahn, a section of Hessische Landesbahn (HLB). This local transport line links the region to the InterCityExpress station. The Unterwesterwaldbahn was fully modernized technically in early 2007 to a state-of-the-art level, thus ensuring continued running for years. Niedererbach is located in the area of the transport association Verkehrsverbund Rhein-Mosel (VRM) zone number 409.

=== Public institutions ===
- Kindergarten
- Dorfgemeinschaftshalle "Haus Erlenbach" (community centre)
- Jugendraum ("Youth Room")
- Barbecue place with pavilion
