= Kadenbach =

- Municipality
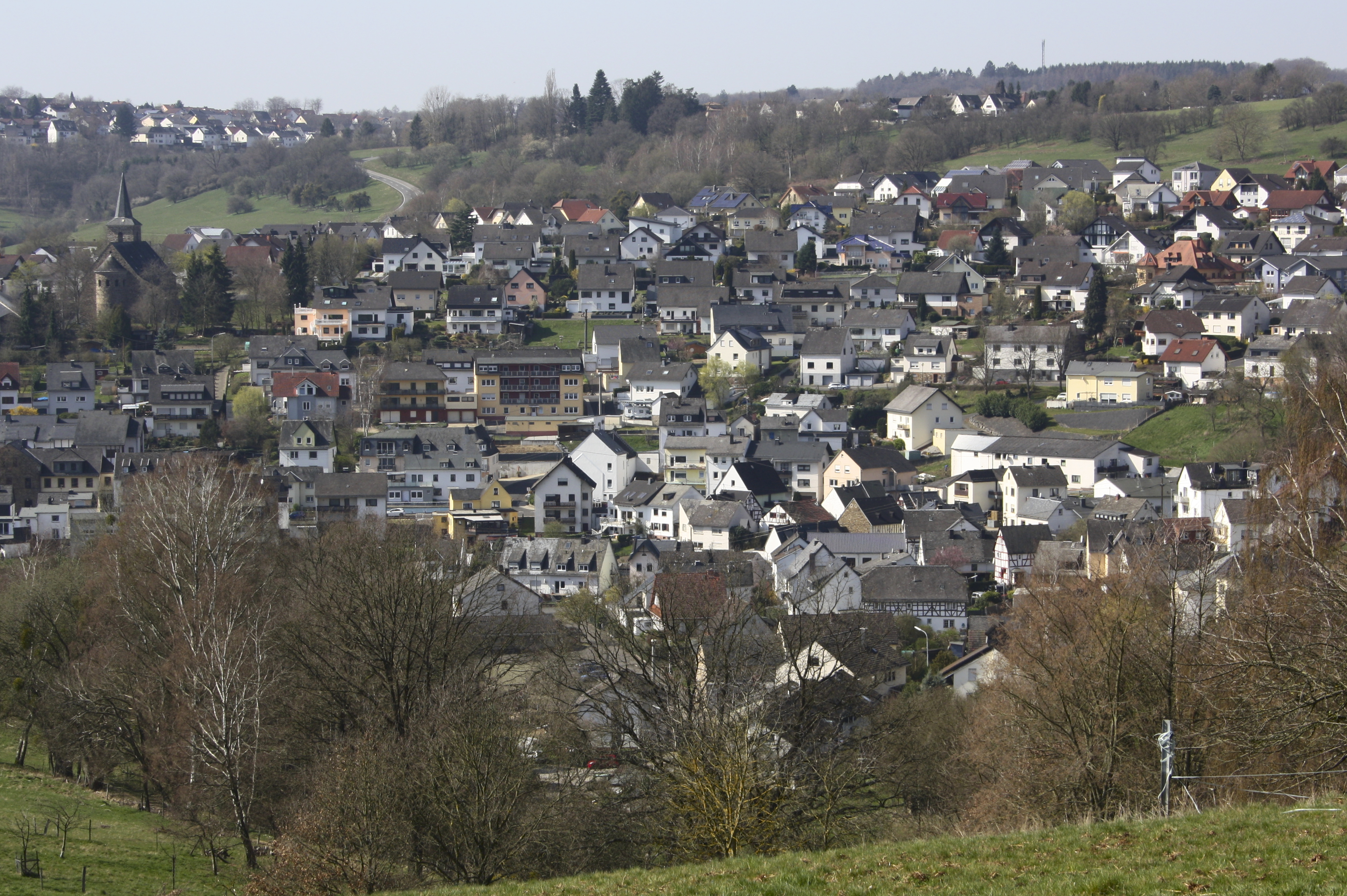

- Coat of arms

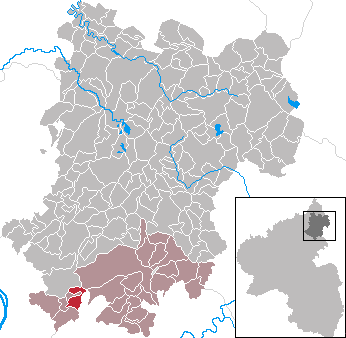
- Location of Kadenbach within Westerwaldkreis district
- Interactive map of Kadenbach
- Location within Germany Location within Rhineland-Palatinate
- Coordinates: 50°23′20″N 7°43′53″E
- Country: Germany
- State: Rhineland-Palatinate
- District: Westerwaldkreis
- Municipal assoc.: Montabaur

Government
  - Mayor (2019–24): Ute Kühchen

Area
  - Total: 4.45 km^{2} (1.72 sq mi)
- Elevation: 250 m (820 ft)

Population (2025-12-31)
  - Total: 1,304
  - Density: 293/km^{2} (759/sq mi)
- Time zone: UTC+01:00 (CET)
  - Summer (DST): UTC+02:00 (CEST)
- Postal codes: 56337
- Dialling codes: 02620
- Vehicle registration: WW
- Website: www.kadenbach.net

Kadenbach is an Ortsgemeinde – a community belonging to a Verbandsgemeinde – in the Westerwaldkreis in Rhineland-Palatinate, Germany.

== Geography ==
The community lies in the Westerwald between Montabaur and Koblenz in the Nassau Nature Park. The community belongs to the Verbandsgemeinde of Montabaur, a kind of collective municipality.

== History ==
In 1110, Kadenbach had its first documentary mention.

== Politics ==
=== Community council ===
The council is made up of 17 council members, including the extraofficial mayor (Bürgermeister), who were elected in a municipal election on 13 June 2004.

	CDU	SPD	FWG Kadenbach	Total
2004	3	4	9	16 seats

=== Coat of arms ===
The community's arms recalls, with the cross pattée resembling the Teutonic Knights’ cross and the black eagle's head as part of the whole, the community's almost 600-year allegiance to the Koblenz House of the Teutonic Knights. The red cross and the tincture silver stand for the overlordship of the Electorate of Trier.

== Economy and infrastructure ==
In 2006, a new credit union was built.

=== Transport ===
The nearest Autobahn interchange is Montabaur on the A 3 (Cologne–Frankfurt), some 12 km away.
