= Eitelborn =

- Municipality
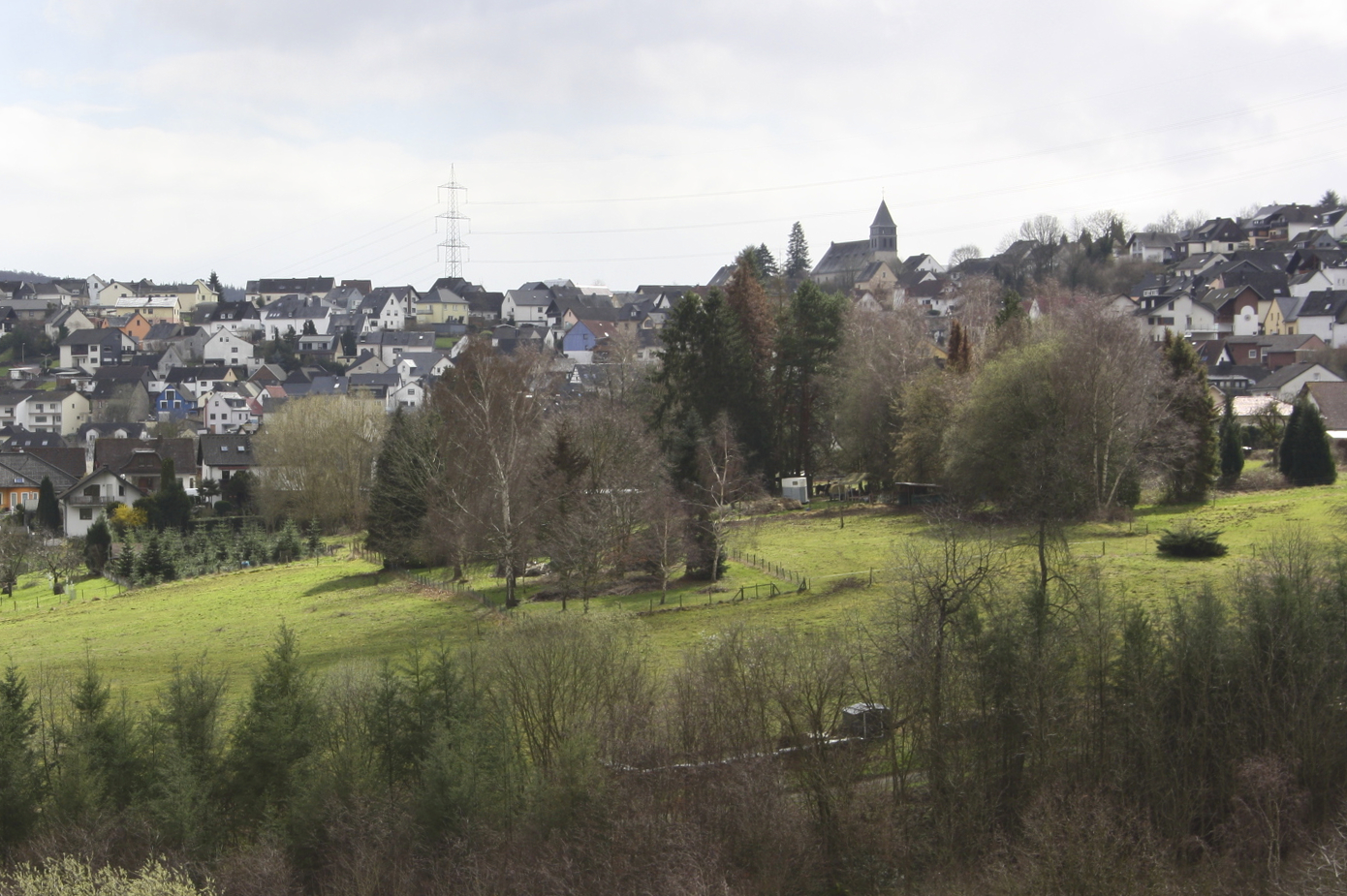

- Coat of arms

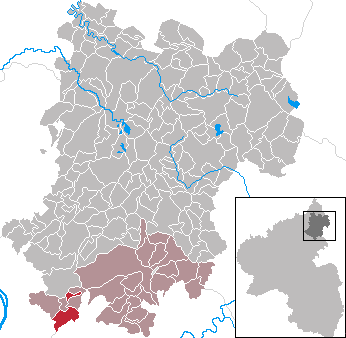
- Location of Eitelborn within Westerwaldkreis district
- Interactive map of Eitelborn
- Location within Germany Location within Rhineland-Palatinate
- Coordinates: 50°22′41″N 7°43′24″E
- Country: Germany
- State: Rhineland-Palatinate
- District: Westerwaldkreis
- Municipal assoc.: Montabaur

Government
  - Mayor (2019–24): Daniel Best

Area
  - Total: 7.10 km^{2} (2.74 sq mi)
- Elevation: 330 m (1,080 ft)

Population (2025-12-31)
  - Total: 2,502
  - Density: 352/km^{2} (913/sq mi)
- Time zone: UTC+01:00 (CET)
  - Summer (DST): UTC+02:00 (CEST)
- Postal codes: 56337
- Dialling codes: 02620
- Vehicle registration: WW
- Website: www.eitelborn.de

Eitelborn is an Ortsgemeinde – a municipality belonging to a Verbandsgemeinde – in the Westerwaldkreis in Rhineland-Palatinate, Germany. It belongs to the Verbandsgemeinde of Montabaur, a kind of collective municipality.

== Geography ==
The municipality lies in the Westerwald between Koblenz, Höhr-Grenzhausen, Montabaur and Bad Ems.

== History ==
In 1377, Eitelborn was first mentioned in a document. The founder was a soldier from Arzbach named Udilo. Named after him is the Udilo Park located on the high ridges at the edge of the forest. In 1967, this small municipality in the Augst – a very small region in the Westerwald – was chosen as the prettiest village in the contest Unser Dorf soll schöner werden (“Our village should become lovelier”).

== Politics ==
The municipal council is made up of 21 council members, who were elected in a municipal election on 7 June 2009, and is presided over by the honorary mayor (Bürgermeister).

	CDU	SPD	Wählergruppe Blath	Total
2004	3	6	11	20 Seats

== Coat of arms ==
The municipality's arms bear three red lilies stemming from the arms borne by the Lords of Helfenstein, who built the Sporkenburg castle. The golden castle outer wall shows the building as it is today. The fountain is a stylized image of one that has been at the old Town Hall Square (Rathausplatz) since 1950.

== Culture and sightseeing ==
=== Buildings ===
About a kilometre south of the village lies the Sporkenburg.
