= Girod, Germany =

- Municipality
- Coat of arms

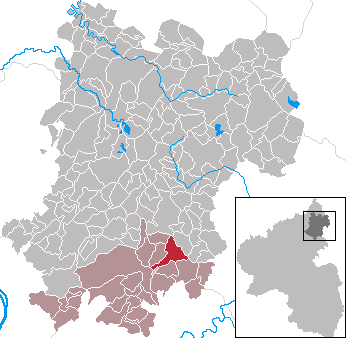
- Location of Girod, Germany within Westerwaldkreis district
- Interactive map of Girod, Germany
- Location within Germany Location within Rhineland-Palatinate
- Coordinates: 50°27′03″N 7°54′36″E
- Country: Germany
- State: Rhineland-Palatinate
- District: Westerwaldkreis
- Municipal assoc.: Montabaur

Government
  - Mayor (2019–24): Hans-Jürgen Herbst

Area
  - Total: 7.46 km^{2} (2.88 sq mi)
- Elevation: 265 m (869 ft)

Population (2025-12-31)
  - Total: 1,216
  - Density: 163/km^{2} (422/sq mi)
- Time zone: UTC+01:00 (CET)
  - Summer (DST): UTC+02:00 (CEST)
- Postal codes: 56412
- Dialling codes: 06485
- Vehicle registration: WW
- Website: www.vg-montabaur.de

Girod is an Ortsgemeinde – a community belonging to a Verbandsgemeinde – in the Westerwaldkreis in Rhineland-Palatinate, Germany.

== Geography ==
=== Location ===
The community lies in the Westerwald between Koblenz and Gießen on the Eisenbach and on the edge of the Nassau Nature Park. It belongs to the Verbandsgemeinde of Montabaur, a kind of collective municipality.

=== Constituent communities ===
Girod has one outlying Ortsteil named Kleinholbach. The two once autonomous villages are separated by the A 3.

== History ==
In 1235, Girod had its first documentary mention.

== Politics ==
The municipal council is made up of 16 council members who were elected in a majority vote in a municipal election on 7 June 2009.

== Economy and infrastructure ==
=== Transport ===
Girod has a stop on the Lower Westerwald Railway (Unterwesterwaldbahn), Siershahn–Montabaur–Limburg, at which stop regional trains roughly every hour, run by DreiLänderBahn, a section of Hessische Landesbahn (HLB).

The nearest Autobahn interchanges are Montabaur and Diez on the A 3 (Cologne–Frankfurt), each 5 km away. The local bus line 450 (Limburg - Diez - Monatabaur serves the village. Marked hiking paths are around the community. Nentershausen is located in the area of the local transport association Verkehrsverbund Rhein-Mosel (VRM), in the Tarifwabe (zone) number 411. The nearest long distance train stops are the railway stations at Limburg and Montabaur, each 12 km away, on the Cologne-Frankfurt high-speed rail line, and Koblenz on the Rechte Rheinstrecke, some 40 km away.
