= Klöckner (disambiguation) =

Klöckner can be:

- Klöckner & Co, German metal handler headquartered in Duisburg
- Klöckner AG, former steel manufacturer
  - Klöckner Stahl, plant in Bremen
- Klöckner Pentaplast, one of the world's largest suppliers of films for pharmaceutical use
- Klöckner Stadium, home to four nationally recognized sports programs
- Manfred Klöckner, East German slalom canoer
