= Montabaur =

- Town
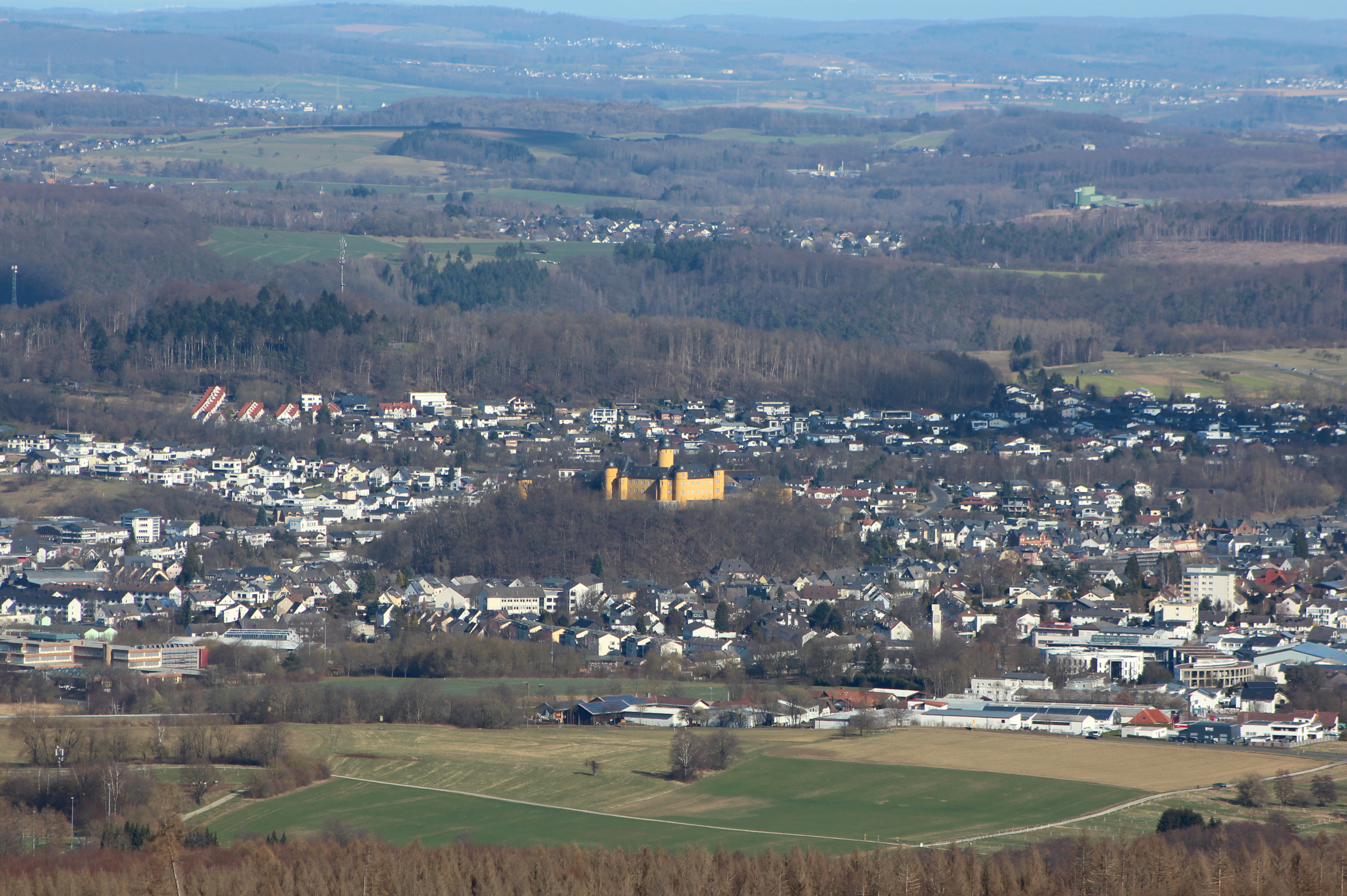

- Coat of arms

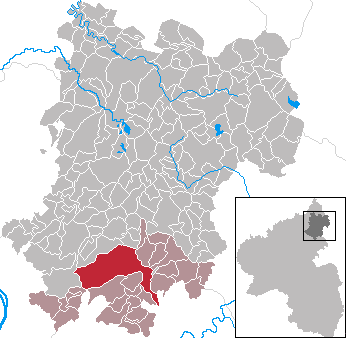
- Location of Montabaur within Westerwaldkreis district
- Interactive map of Montabaur
- Location within Germany Location within Rhineland-Palatinate
- Coordinates: 50°26′15″N 7°49′33″E
- Country: Germany
- State: Rhineland-Palatinate
- District: Westerwaldkreis
- Municipal assoc.: Montabaur

Government
  - Mayor (2019–24): Gabriele Wieland (CDU)

Area
  - Total: 33.77 km^{2} (13.04 sq mi)
- Elevation: 230 m (750 ft)

Population (2025-12-31)
  - Total: 14,937
  - Density: 442.3/km^{2} (1,146/sq mi)
- Time zone: UTC+01:00 (CET)
  - Summer (DST): UTC+02:00 (CEST)
- Postal codes: 56410
- Dialling codes: 02602
- Vehicle registration: WW
- Website: www.montabaur.de

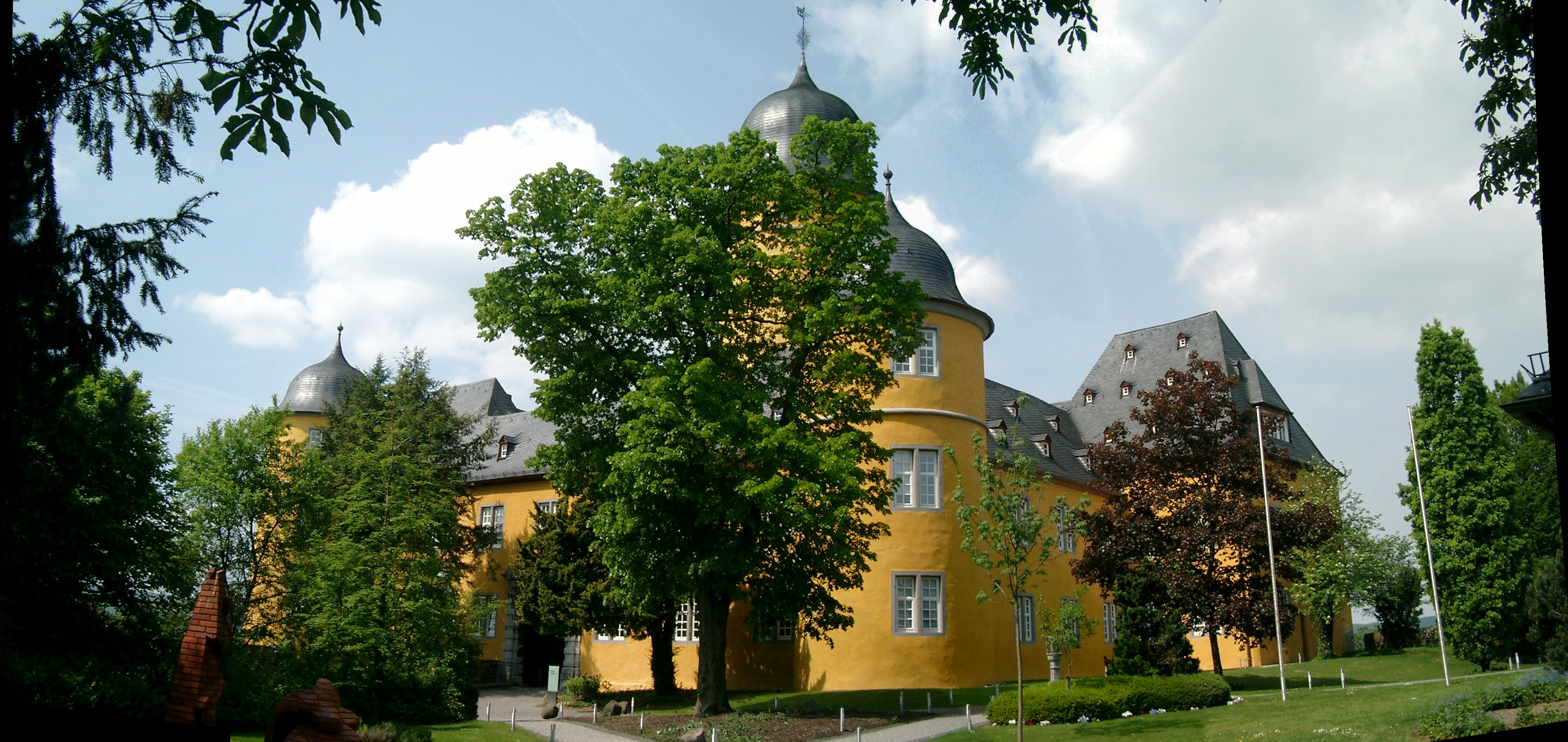
Montabaur Castle

Montabaur (German pronunciation: [ˈmɔntaˌbaʊɐ]) is a town and the district seat of the Westerwaldkreis in Rhineland-Palatinate, Germany. It is also the administrative centre of the Verbandsgemeinde of Montabaur – a kind of collective municipality – to which 24 other communities belong. The town is known throughout the country for its strikingly yellow castle and its InterCityExpress railway station on the Cologne-Frankfurt high-speed rail line.

== Geography ==
=== Location ===
Montabaur lies in the Westerwald, roughly 20 km northeast of Koblenz. About 14,000 people live in the city, while the district is home to about 40,000.

=== Constituent communities ===
Montabaur has seven outlying centres. In the north lies Eschelbach, and in the west lie Horressen and Elgendorf. Stretching south along the Gelbach valley are the pilgrimage centre of Wirzenborn, and, farther along still, Reckenthal, Bladernheim and Ettersdorf.

=== Neighbouring communities ===
Montabaur's neighbours are, clockwise beginning in the north, Dernbach, Staudt, Heiligenroth, Großholbach, Girod, Steinefrenz, Heilberscheid, Isselbach, Stahlhofen, Untershausen, Holler, Niederelbert, Arzbach, Kadenbach, Neuhäusel, Nomborn and Hillscheid.

== Town's character ==
Montabaur's Old Town (Altstadt) is famed for its Gothic Revival Roter Löwe ("Red Lion") town hall, many timber-frame houses from the 16th and 17th centuries and the great Late Gothic Catholic parish church. The mediaeval town wall is partially preserved, including the Wolfsturm ("Wolf's Tower").

The Montabaur Stadthalle (literally "town hall", but actually an event venue) is intended for various functions such as conferences, concerts, theatre and other events. The historic Wolfsturm is at the townsfolk's disposal and can be hired for use.

=== Castle ===
Montabaur Castle became a property of the archbishop of Trier in 1018, and was renovated to its current appearance around 1700. It later housed the seat of the district administrator's office of the old Unterwesterwaldkreis until 1945 before becoming the seat of the Montabaur district government. Today, it is owned by the Akademie Deutscher Genossenschaften ('Academy of German Co-operatives'), which has expanded it for use as a 4-star conference hotel and training centre for the German Cooperative Financial Group. It stands in a prominent position above the town on the Schlossberg ('Castle Mountain') at 321 m above sea level.

== History ==
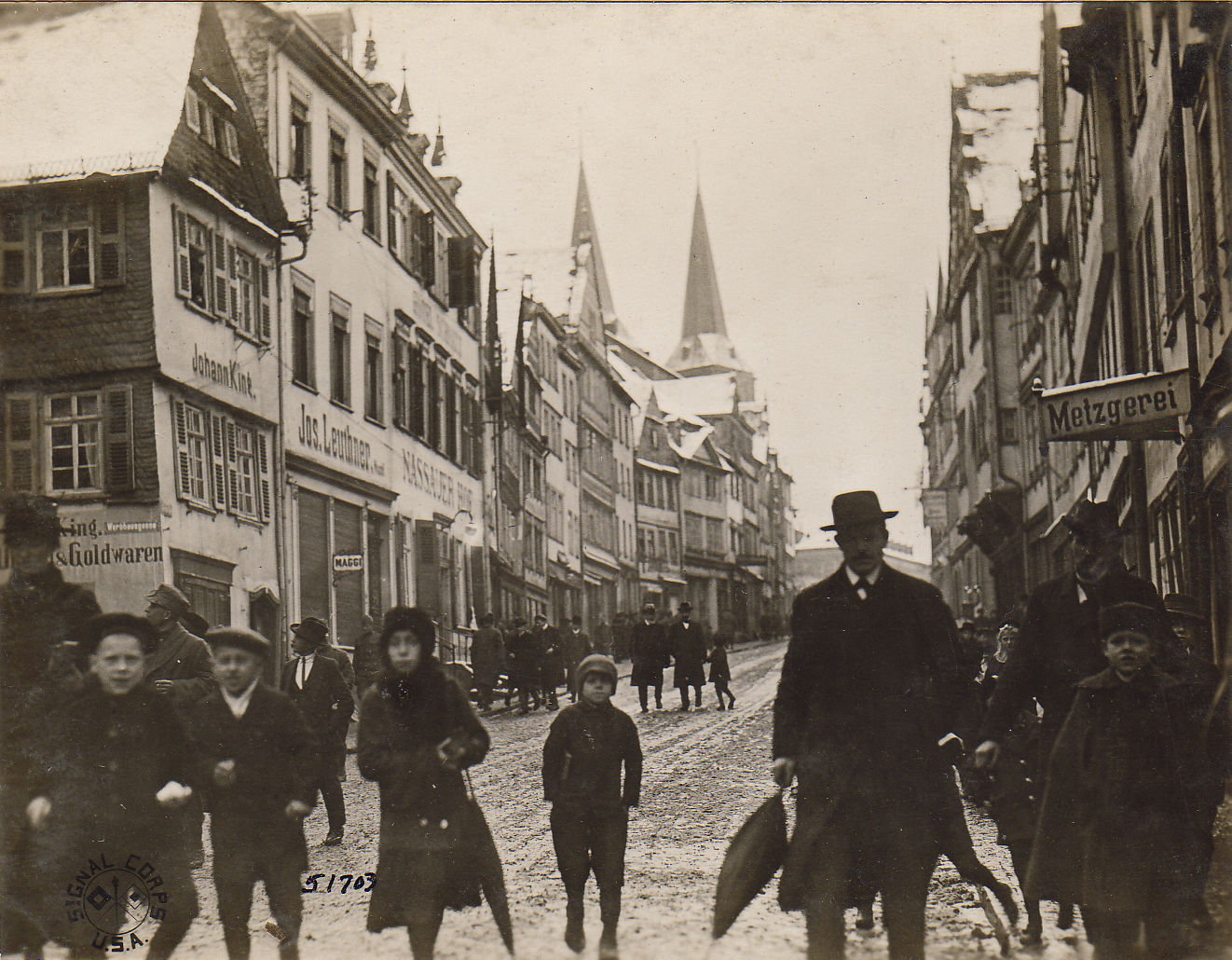
Montabaur in 1918

The town has a history that can be traced back to the year 959, with the Montabaur fort castellum Humbacense. The Archbishop-Elector of Trier, Dietrich von Wied, who came back from a Crusade in the Holy Land about 1217, had the humbacense castle newly built and named it Mons Tabor for its similarity to Mount Tabor, said to be the place of the Transfiguration of Jesus. Out of this grew Montabaur. In 1291, King Rudolf von Habsburg (1218–1291) granted Montabaur, as well as Welschbillig, Mayen, Bernkastel and Saarburg, town rights, so that the village became a town with its own coat of arms and a town wall.

In 1802 with the dissolution of the Archbishopric-Electorate of Trier the princes of Nassau took power in Montabaur and annexed it to the Duchy of Nassau in 1806. With Prussia annexing Nassau in 1866 Montabaur became part of the Wiesbaden Region within the Province of Hesse-Nassau. In 1945 the western Allies partitioned the northwestern part of the Wiesbaden Region with Montabaur and annexed it to the new German state of Rhineland-Palatinate. The partitioned part of the Wiesbaden Region then formed the Montabaur Region (as of 1946) seated in Montabaur. In 1968 the Montabaur Region, one of the originally five Regierungsbezirke of Rhineland-Palatinate, was dissolved and its territory annexed to the adjacent Koblenz Region.

Until early 2004, Montabaur was furthermore a Bundeswehr station with the Westerwaldkaserne, where the Raketenartilleriebataillon 350 (RakArtBtl 350) and, later, maintenance units were stationed.

== Politics ==
The town council is composed as follows:

- CDU – 15 seats
- SPD – 5 seats
- FWG – 3 seats
- BfM Bürger für Montabaur – 3 seats
- Wählergruppe Hatzmann – 2 seats

== Economy ==
United Internet is headquartered in Montabaur.

- Volkmann & Rossbach Verkehrssicherheitssysteme (transport safety systems)
- Deco Glas
- Ursa Chemie
- Klöckner Pentaplast
- in planning: printing centre for the Mittelrhein-Verlag/Rhein-Zeitung
- Metallwerk Elisenhütte, maker of small-calibre ammunition

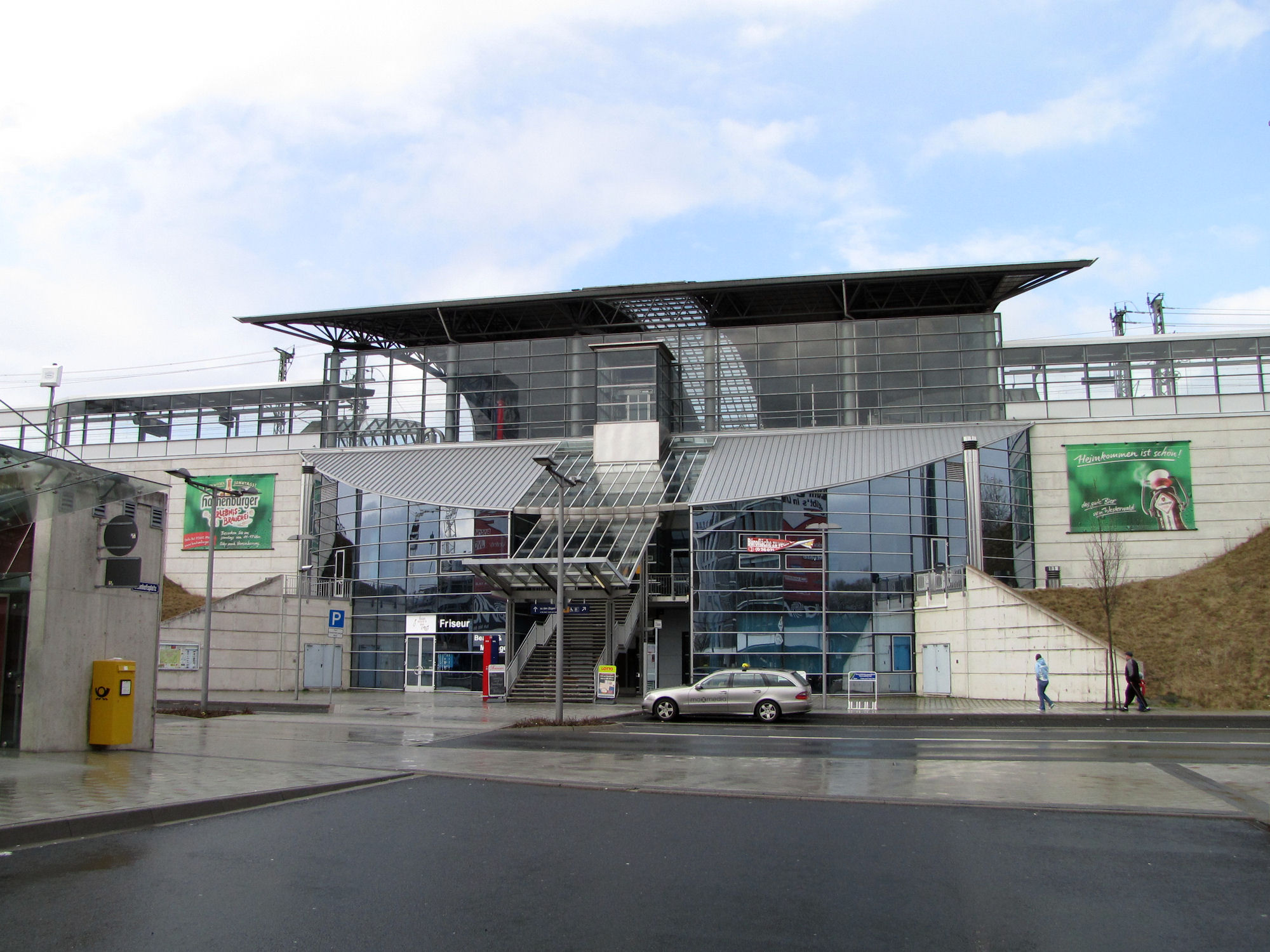
Montabaur station

== Transport ==
- A 3 (Cologne–Frankfurt)
- Bundesstraße 49
- Bundesstraße 255
- Local bus lines 420, 425, 450, 453, 456, 458, 459, 460, 463, 464, 469, 477, 481, 482, 963, 965, N46 and N49.
- Railway station at the Cologne-Frankfurt high-speed rail line, that passes the Himmelbergtunnel, the Lower Westerwald railway, operated hourly by DreiLänderBahn, a section of Hessische Landesbahn (HLB) as well as the Westerwaldquerbahn (Cross Westerwald railway) from Montabaur via Wallmerod, Westerburg and Rennerod to Herborn, which is out of service since for passenger trains and partly deconsteucted, nowadays the section between Montabaur and Wallmerod is only in service for fright traffic and the section from Fehl-Ritzhausen to Rennerod station touristic Railbike tours take place organized by the interest group IG Westerwald-Querbahn e. V. (IWQ).

Special train rides on the Montabaur - Wallmerod section, organized by IWQ took place in 2005, 2006, 2007 and 2010.

- Montabaur is located in the area of the transport association Verkehrsverbund Rhein-Mosel (VRM), fare zone 412.
- Park and ride lot at Montabaur train station.
- Planned: New railway line from Neuwied via Ransbach-Baumbach and Siershahn to Montabaur station via Brexbach Valley railway
- Recreational airfield for gliders

== Culture and sightseeing ==
=== Buildings ===
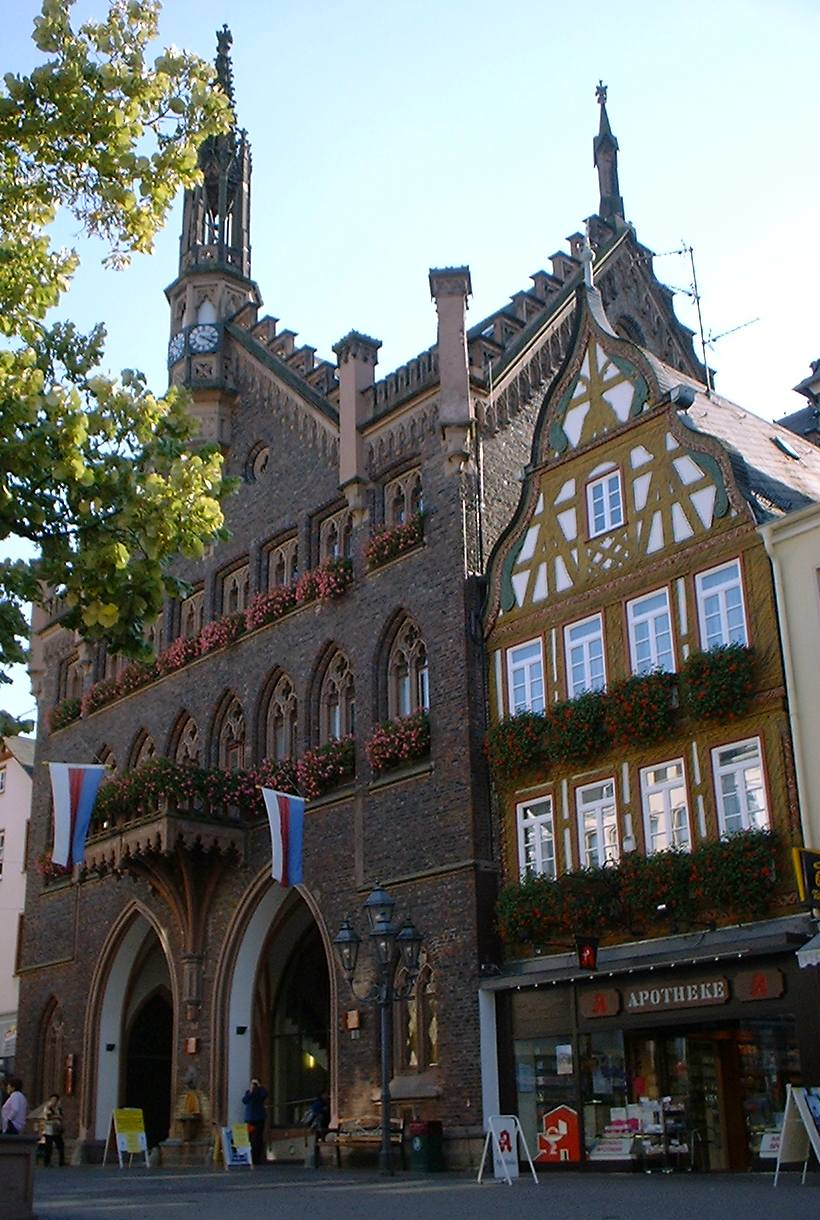
Gothic Revival Town Hall

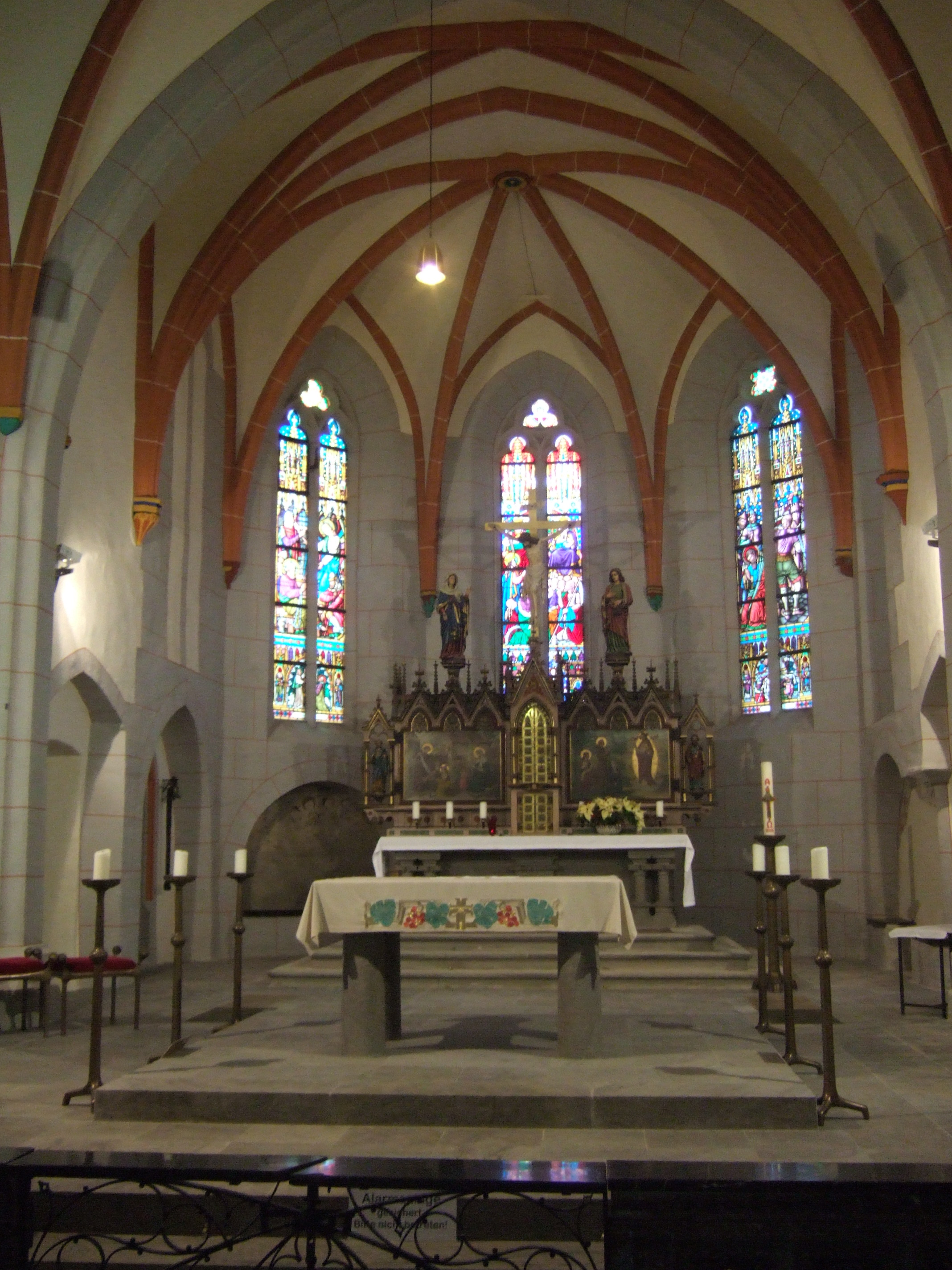
Chancel at the Catholic Church of Saint Peter in Ketten

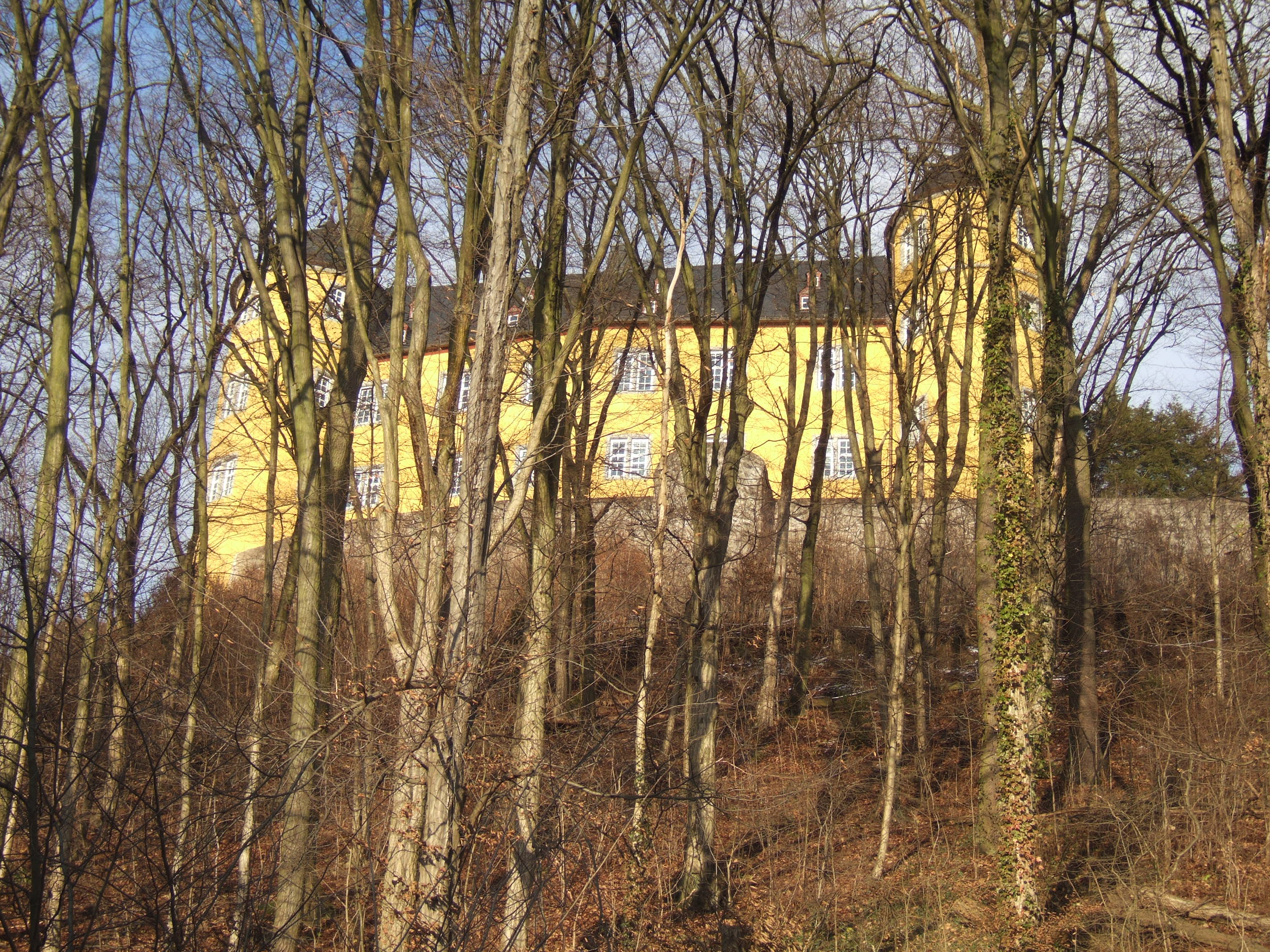
Montabaur Castle seen from the south foot of Mons Tabor

- Montabaur Castle
- Wolfsturm (Old Town Wall)
- Parts of the Old Town Wall
- Neo-Gothic Town Hall, built between 1866 and 1868
- many well preserved timber-frame houses, among them one formerly occupied by the Baron of Stein
- Historic Werbhaus

=== Churches ===
- St. Peter in Ketten

The earliest forerunner of the building nowadays used as a Catholic parish church was a wooden church built in 940. In 959 followed another church building on this spot, this time with a stone foundation. Today's church was built between the 12th and 14th centuries. The oldest parts of the building display Romanesque style elements, although the church's overall character is Early Gothic. Peculiarities in the décor are a Doomsday painting above the quire arch and a stone Madonna, both remnants of the original décor, as well as a wooden Madonna from about 1450. The parish church has been lavishly renovated and now shines with a new radiance.

- Brüderkirche (Catholic), "Brethren's Church", House of God used by the order known as the Barmherzige Brüder Montabaur ("Montabaur Merciful Brethren")
- Pauluskirche (Protestant)
- Lutherkirche (Protestant)
- Anna- or Fuhrmannskapelle

The churchyard's former funerary chapel was built in 1300 and given timber-frame work on the sides and top in the 17th and 18th centuries, which housed the parish vicars' dwellings. Today it is part of the house façade southeast of the parish church.

- Marien-Wallfahrtskirche (pilgrimage church) in the outlying centre of Wirzenborn in the Gelbach valley.

=== Cultural institutions ===
- Amateur theatre "Die Oase"
- Stadtbücherei (town library)
- Haus der Jugend ("House of Youth")
- Katholische öffentliche Bücherei (Catholic public library)
- Stadtarchiv (town archive)
- Stadthalle Haus Mons-Tabor (event venue)
- Akademie für Darstellende Kunst Schauspielwerkstatt e.V. ("Academy for Representative Art" Exhibition Workshop)
- Akademietheater Rheinland-Pfalz
- DPSG scout group "St. Peter in Ketten"
- Kino "Capitol" (cinema)
- Kulturwerkraum

=== Leisure ===
- Mons-Tabor-Bad (swimming pool)
- Trimm-Dich-Pfad (fitness path)
- Nordic-Walking-Park
  - The routes are certified by the Deutscher Nordic Walking Nordic Inline Verband (DNV) and range from the shortest route, the 2.36-km fitness path to the longest, the 11.16-km Biebrichskopf-Route. Integrated into the Montabaur Nordic-Walking-Park, too, is the 10-km-long Münz-Sylvesterlauf jogging path.
- Cycling paths run from Montabaur though the Gelbach valley to the Lahn valley.

=== Aid organizations ===
- Montabaur fire brigade
- Technisches Hilfswerk
- German Red Cross
- Deutsche Lebens-Rettungs-Gesellschaft (lifesaving)

=== Sport clubs ===
- American football
  - 1. AFC Fighting Farmers Montabaur 1992 e.V.
- Angling club
  - ASV Montabaur e.V.
- Athletics
  - TuS Montabaur
- Badminton
  - BC Montabaur Staudt
- Basketball
  - BBC Montabaur e.V.
- Boxing
  - BCM Boxclub Montabaur e.V
- Cycling
  - RSG Montabaur
- Diving
  - Tauchsportgruppe Montabaur (TSG)
- Football
  - 1. FFC Montabaur/Ww. (girls' and women's football)
  - TuS Montabaur
  - SV Horressen/Elgendorf
- Hiking
  - Schusterjungen Volkssportclub Montabaur
- Judo
  - Sportfreunde Montabaur e.V.
- Riding
  - Reitverein Montabaur 1965 e.V.
- Shooting
  - Schützengesellschaft "St. Sebastianus" 1588 / 1957 e.V. Montabaur (shooting-society-Montabaur)
- Skiing
  - Skiclub Montabaur-Horressen
- Swimming
  - DLRG Montabaur
  - TuS Montabaur
- Tennis
  - TC Schwarz-Weiss Montabaur
  - TC Mittelwald Montabaur-Horressen
- Triathlon
  - RSG Montabaur
- Volleyball, Beachsport
  - Beach-Club Dernbach/Montabaur 1995 e.V.

=== Events ===
- Schustermarkt (shoemakers' market)
- Schützenfest ("shooting club's festival") every year in July.
- Jazzwochenende Montabaur ("Jazz Weekend")
- Kneipenfestival ("Pub Festival")
- MonsTaRock
- Mach1 Festival
- Aktivtage
- Kirmes

== Education ==
=== Schools ===
- Joseph-Kehrein-Schule

Big municipal primary school of Montabaur (in 2006, 370 pupils, 16 classes) with a preschool kindergarten class, voluntary all-day school Monday-Thursday until 16:00 including lunch, homework supervision, supervised free time and many further educational offerings. Integrated foreign-language work in English and French. Partner school: École Louis Pasteur in Tonnerre, Burgundy.

- Waldschule (primary school and Hauptschule) in outlying centre of Horressen
- Rhineland-Palatinate state musical Gymnasium

The Peter-Altmeier-Gymnasium Montabaur was until 1999 an Aufbaugymnasium (a Gymnasium for former Realschule students who want to upgrade their secondary education with an Abitur). As of 1991, the first music students came into the fifth class; these first music students did their Abitur in 2000.

- Mons-Tabor-Gymnasium: Gymnasium with bilingual and natural-sciences section
- Anne-Frank-Realschule
- Heinrich-Roth Duale Oberschule (secondary school)
- Berufsbildende Schule Montabaur (vocational education)
- Akademie für Darstellende Kunst e.V ("Academy for Representative Art")

=== Adult education ===
- Berufsfortbildungswerk (institution connected with the German Confederation of Trade Unions)
- Bildungswerk Sport – Westerwald branch (sport training)
- Info-Stelle Weiterbildung (further education information)
- Katholische Erwachsenenbildung (Catholic adult education)
- Kreisvolkshochschule (KVHS, district folk high school)
- Staatliche Lehr- und Versuchsanstalt (state teaching and experimental station)
- Volkshochschule der Verbandsgemeinde Montabaur (VHS, folk high school of the Verbandsgemeinde of Montabaur)
- Institut für Schulung und Beruf (ISB, institute for schooling and careers)

== Town partnerships ==
Montabaur maintains partnership arrangements with the following towns:

- Tonnerre, Burgundy, France
- Brackley, Northamptonshire, England, United Kingdom
- Sebnitz, Saxony, Germany

Furthermore, the Verbandsgemeinde of Montabaur has a partnership with an American town:

- (United States) Fredericksburg, Texas, USA

== Notable residents ==
=== Sons and daughters of the town ===
- J. Fred Schmidt (1865-1907), butcher who emigrated to Columbus, Ohio, where he founded the meatpacking business that eventually became Schmidt's Sausage Haus, a landmark restaurant in the city's German Village
- J. C. Leyendecker (1874–1951), graphic artist and illustrator
- Maximilian Sauerborn (1889–1963), jurist, administrative official and politician
- Anton Diel (1898–1959), politician, 1949–59 Member of the Bundestag
- August Kunst (1898–1980), politician, 1957–61 Member of the Bundestag
- Heinz König (1927–2002), economist, Rector of the University of Mannheim, founding father of the Centre for European Economic Research (ZEW) in Mannheim
- Frank Decker (1964–), political scientist, professor of political science at the University of Bonn
- Michael Krug, head chocolatier at L.A. Burdick in the United States

=== People connected with Montabaur ===
- Johann V of Isenburg (1507–1556), Archbishop and Elector of Trier, lived his last years at Schloss Montabaur where he died
- Ralph Dommermuth (1963–), founder of United Internet and Internet entrepreneur from Germany
- Joseph Kehrein (1808–1876), honorary citizen of Montabaur, teacher, philologist, historian and director of the Montabaur teachers' college
- Karl Walter (1862–1929), organist, educator, scientist and authority on organs and bells, died in Montabaur and is buried here
- Andreas Lubitz (1987–2015), co-pilot of Germanwings 9525
