= L.A. Burdick =

American chocolatier

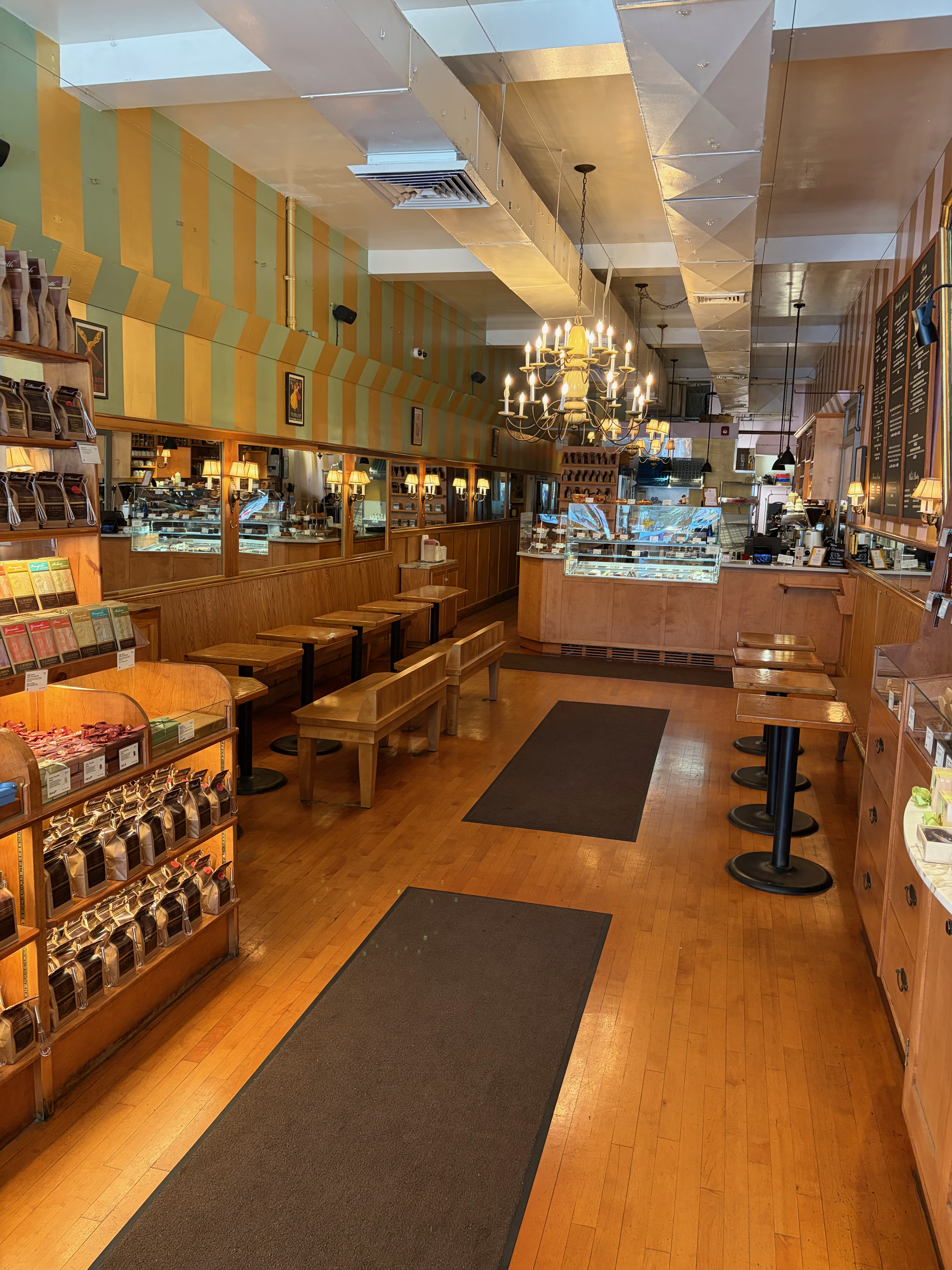
- The L.A. Burdick on Brattle Street in Cambridge, Massachusetts
- Industry: Confectionery
- Founded: 1987 (39 years ago)
- Founders: Larry Burdick
- Headquarters: United States
- Number of locations: 7 (2026)
- Products: Chocolate; confectionery
- Website: burdickchocolate.com

L.A. Burdick is a chocolatier established by Larry Burdick in 1987. It has seven locations in the United States: three in Massachusetts and one each in New York City, Chicago, Washington, D.C., and Walpole, New Hampshire.

== History ==
The first L.A. Burdick shop opened its doors in New York City in 1987. Five years later, Larry Burdick and his family moved the business to Walpole, New Hampshire. From there, they continued to expand their reach, opening additional locations in Massachusetts and other parts of the United States.

== Head chocolatier ==
Michael Klug is the long-time head chocolatier at L.A. Burdick. Originally from Montabaur, Germany, Klug has worked at some well-known restaurants in the United States and Germany, including one with a Michelin star.

== Chocolate and delicacies ==
L.A. Burdick's chocolate is sourced from Switzerland, France and Venezuela, using cocoa beans from South and Central America as well as the Caribbean. They avoid using extracts or artificial flavorings. They offer a variety of hot chocolates including dark, milk and white chocolate. They also have a changing monthly menu with selections from different countries.

== Locations and design ==
L.A. Burdick has seven locations. Each shop has the same overall theme which was designed with the help of Paula Burdick, Larry's wife, who attended the Fashion Institute of Technology and assisted in the design of shops in Paris. The locations are Parisian-style and make use of brown tones to complement wood elements. The first location in New York City was opened in 1987, and the second location in New Hampshire in 1997. The third location was in Cambridge, Massachusetts. The fourth location opened its doors in Boston on Clarendon Street in 2012. The fifth location opened in 2017 in Chicago, Illinois, and the sixth in Washington, D.C. in 2020. The most recent location opened in Brookline, Massachusetts, in 2024. In February 2026, it was announced that L.A. Burdick had rented a Flatiron District storefront for a second New York City location. Boston Logan Airport hosted an L.A. Burdick pop-up in the spring of 2026.
