= Joseph Kehrein =

German educator, philologist and historian

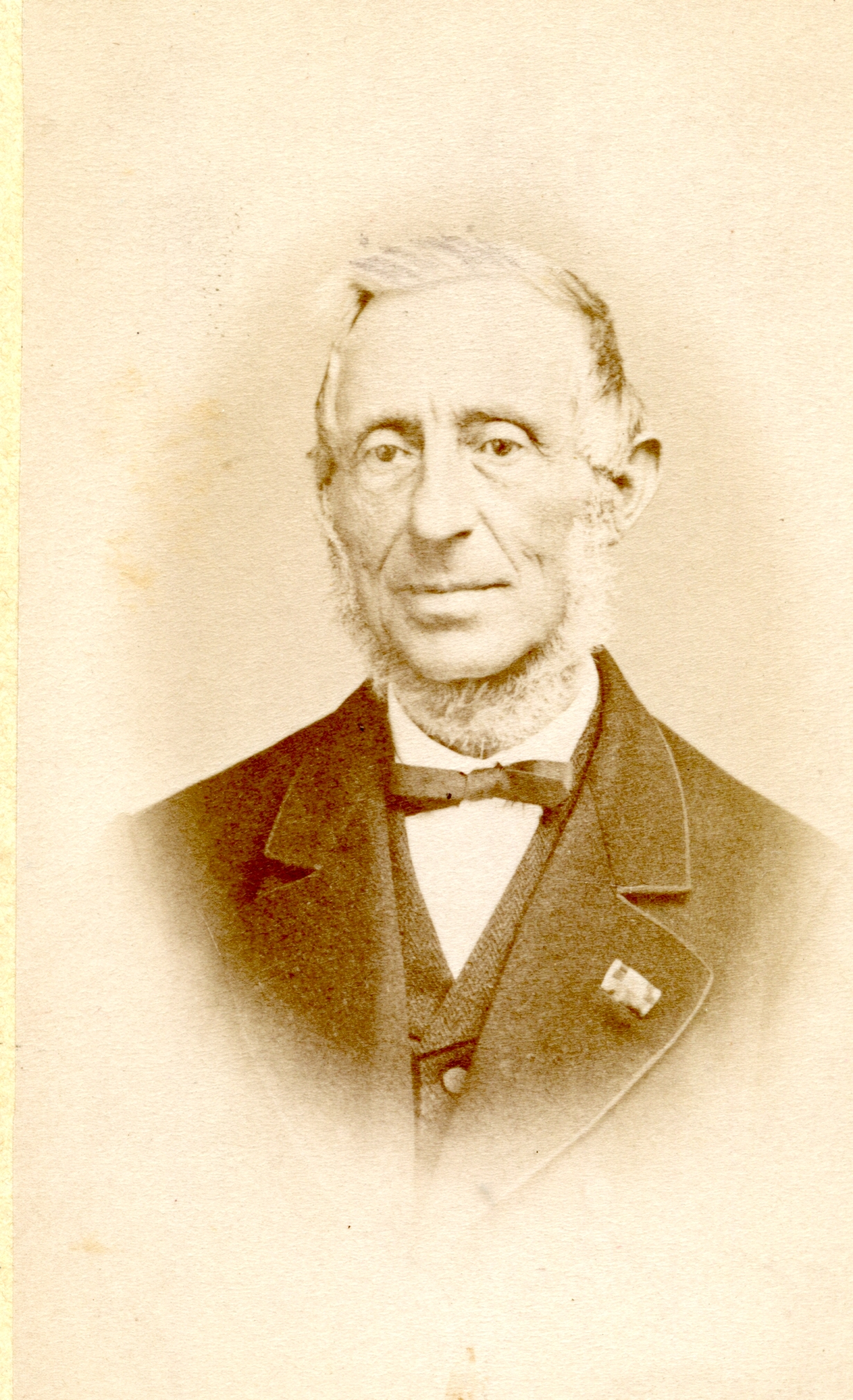
Joseph Kehrein

Joseph Kehrein (1808-1876) was a German educator, philologist and historian of German literature.

== Biography ==
He was born at Heidesheim am Rhein, near Mainz on 20 October 1808. In 1823 he entered the gymnasium in connection with the diocesan seminary at Mainz, and after its suppression in 1829 he continued his classical studies at the state gymnasium of the same place, where he graduated in 1831.

After studying philology at the University of Giessen from 1831 to 1834, he taught at the gymnasium of Darmstadt, 1835–1837, at that of Mainz, 1837–1845, was prorector at the newly founded gymnasium of Hadamar in Nassau, 1845–1846, professor at the same place, 1846–1855, director of the Catholic teachers' seminary at Montabaur, 1855–1876, and at the same time director of the Realschule at the same place, 1855–1866.

He died at Montabaur in Hesse-Nassau on 25 March 1876.

== Writings ==
He is the author of numerous works, chiefly on the German language, on the history of German literature and on pedagogy. The best known among them are:

- Die dramatische Poesie der Deutschen (2 volumes, Leipzig, 1840)
- Grammatik der deutschen Sprache (2 volumes, Leipzig, 1842–1851)
- Geschichte der katholischen Kanzeiberedsamkeit der Deutschen (3 volumes, Ratisbon, 1843)
- Die weltliche Beredsamkeit der Deutschen (Mainz, 1846)
- Grammatik der deutschen Sprache des 15-17. Jahrhunderts (5 volumes, Leipzig, 1854–1856; 2nd ed., 1863)
- Biographisch-kritisches Lexikon der katholicsch-deutschen Dichter, Volks- und Jugenschriftsteller des 19. Jahrhundrets (2 volumes, Würzburg, 1868–1871)
- Handbuch der Erziehung und des Unterrichts (Paderborn, 1876; 12 ed., 1906)
- Ueberblick der Geschichte der Erziehung (Paderborn, 1873; 11th ed., 1899).

He also edited Katholische Kirchenlieder aus den altesten deutschen Gesangbuchern (3 volumes, Würzburg, 1859–1865) and Lateinische Sequenzen des Mittelaters (Mainz, 1873).
