= Wackernheim =

- Ortsteil of Ingelheim am Rhein
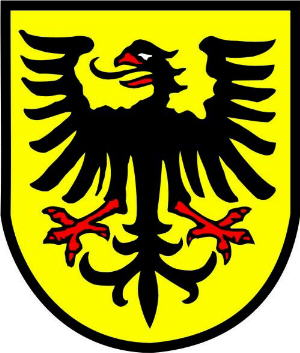
- Coat of arms
- Interactive map of Wackernheim
- Location within Germany Location within Rhineland-Palatinate
- Coordinates: 49°58′27″N 8°07′00″E
- Country: Germany
- State: Rhineland-Palatinate
- District: Mainz-Bingen
- Town: Ingelheim am Rhein

Area
  - Total: 5.89 km^{2} (2.27 sq mi)
- Elevation: 222 m (728 ft)

Population (2018-12-31)
  - Total: 2,517
  - Density: 427/km^{2} (1,110/sq mi)
- Time zone: UTC+01:00 (CET)
  - Summer (DST): UTC+02:00 (CEST)
- Postal codes: 55263
- Dialling codes: 06132
- Vehicle registration: MZ
- Website: www.wackernheim.de

Wackernheim (German pronunciation: [ˈvakɐnhaɪm]) is a former Ortsgemeinde – a municipality belonging to a Verbandsgemeinde, a kind of collective municipality – in the Mainz-Bingen district in Rhineland-Palatinate, Germany. Since July 2019, it is part of the town Ingelheim am Rhein.

It is home to the United States Army's McCully Barracks.

== Geography ==
=== Location ===
The municipality lies west of Mainz in a side valley of the Rhine between the Rabenkopf nature reserve, Layenhof and the Mainzer Berg (mountain). Until July 2019 Wackernheim belonged to the Verbandsgemeinde of Heidesheim am Rhein, whose seat was in the like-named municipality.

== History ==
In 754, Wackernheim had its first documentary mention.

== Politics ==
=== Municipal council ===
The council is made up of 19 council members, counting the part-time mayor, with seats apportioned thus:

	SPD	CDU	Grüne	FWG	BL	Total
2004	6	4	4	3	1	18 seats

(as at municipal election held on 13 June 2004)

=== Town partnerships ===
- Daix, Côte-d'Or, France
- Roncà, Province of Verona, Veneto, Italy

=== Coat of arms ===
The municipality's arms might be described thus: Or an eagle displayed sable armed and beaked gules.

== Culture and sightseeing ==
The municipality's biggest sport club is Turn- und Sportverein 1862 Wackernheim e. V.. It has more than 800 members in the departments football, gymnastics, table tennis, taekwondo and leisure sports. The sport club's hall is also used for other cultural events.

Another big club is the Carneval Club Wackernheim, founded in 1949. MGV 1888 Wackernheim (men's singing club) is a steadfast part of the municipality's cultural life. The traditional mixed choir folded at the end of 2006. The choir Haste Töne?! inspires with well-known rock and pop pieces and stands out through innovative events in the framework of the Wackernheim kermis (church consecration festival, locally known as the Kerb), among others. The choirmaster is Matthias Heucher. Since mid-2006, there has also been the children's choir Haste Tönchen?! under Kirsten Grünenpütt's leadership.

== Economy and infrastructure ==
Wackernheim's economy is based on fruit- and winegrowing.

=== Transport ===
Wackernheim lies not far from the Autobahn A 60, which can be reached through the Heidesheim, Ingelheim Ost and Mainz-Finthen interchanges. There are links to the DB local transport network in Heidesheim. Moreover, the Mainzer Verkehrsgesellschaft bus route 56 runs from the Wackernheim Town Hall Square by way of Mainz-Finthen and the university to the nearest long-distance railway station in Mainz in 22 minutes.
