= Heidesheim am Rhein =

- Borough of Ingelheim am Rhein
- Coat of arms
- Interactive map of Heidesheim am Rhein
- Location within Germany Location within Rhineland-Palatinate
- Coordinates: 50°00′00″N 8°07′33″E
- Country: Germany
- State: Rhineland-Palatinate
- District: Mainz-Bingen
- Town: Ingelheim am Rhein

Area
  - Total: 17.56 km^{2} (6.78 sq mi)
- Elevation: 148 m (486 ft)

Population (2018-12-31)
  - Total: 7,619
  - Density: 433.9/km^{2} (1,124/sq mi)
- Time zone: UTC+01:00 (CET)
  - Summer (DST): UTC+02:00 (CEST)
- Postal codes: 55262
- Dialling codes: 06132
- Vehicle registration: MZ
- Website: www.og-heidesheim.de

Heidesheim am Rhein (German pronunciation: [ˈhaɪdəshaɪm ʔam ˈʁaɪn], lit. 'Heidesheim on the Rhine') is an Ortsbezirk (borough) of the town Ingelheim am Rhein in the Mainz-Bingen district in Rhineland-Palatinate, Germany. Before July 2019, it was a separate municipality belonging to the former Verbandsgemeinde (a kind of collective municipality) Heidesheim am Rhein, of which it was the administrative seat. Heidesheim was one of the biggest municipalities in Rhenish Hesse.

== Geography ==
=== Location ===
Heidesheim lies in northern Rhenish Hesse, on the so-called Rhine Knee, west of the state capital, Mainz. The municipal area reaches in the north up to the middle of the Rhine's navigational lane, which here reaches one of its greatest breadths, comprising even the Königsklinger Aue (an island, although its name identifies it as a floodplain). At the bank behind the floodwall, at an elevation of some 82 m, it abuts a sandy plain which is used especially for growing asparagus and which is also covered in fruit trees. Just behind the floodwall is the outlying centre of Heidenfahrt. From here, before the channelling work on the Mariannenaue (floodplain) was broadened towards the east, there was once a ferry link to Erbach. The community core of Heidesheim itself lies some 2 km from the Rhine's banks, in a location safe from floodwaters at the foot of the Rhenish Hesse hill country. The municipal area stretches on from there up the north slope of these hills, reaching 2 km east of the municipality's centre an elevation of 207 m above sea level. Wherever gaps in the fruit trees allow it, there is a broad view over the Rhine into the Rheingau, all the way to the western part of the Taunus’s main ridge, the Rheingau Range (Rheingaugebirge) with the Kalte Herberge and the Hallgarter Zange (mountains) as its highest elevations in the centre. In the east, near Uhlerborn, on the boundary with Budenheim, Heidesheim has a share of one of Rhenish Hesse's few wooded areas.

As of late 2006 Heidesheim has a population of 7,195, and covers and area of 17.56 km².

=== Constituent communities ===
Heidesheim's Ortsteile are Heidesheim, Heidenfahrt and Uhlerborn.

=== Neighbouring municipalities ===
Clockwise from the north, these are Eltville am Rhein (on the Rhine's right, or north, bank), Budenheim, Mainz’s outlying centres of Gonsenheim and Finthen, the Verbandsgemeinde of Nieder-Olm, the Verbandsgemeinde of Gau-Algesheim and the town of Ingelheim

== History ==
Many finds from prehistory and early historical times confirm that Heidesheim am Rhein's municipal area was settled as early as the New Stone Age (5500 to 2200 BC). Most have been chance finds. In Roman times, north of today's community core, stood an extensive villa rustica, which was forsaken after the Germanic invasions in the early 5th century. Within its walls was built Saint George's Chapel (Sankt Georgskapelle), around which, after the mid 7th century, Frankish settlers came to live. The municipality's name is said to go back to an estate owned by a Frankish nobleman called Heisino.

The place had its first documentary mention as Heisinisheim or Hasinisheim in donations to the Lorsch Abbey, the earliest of which purports to date from 762, although in actuality it can only be traced back to some time between September in one of the years between 765 and 768. The earliest confirmed date is 5 July 768. All together, the Lorsch codex catalogues ten endowments for the Lorsch Abbey in Heidesheim between 765 or 768 and 794, of which however none crops up in later documents. This circumstance leads to the inference that Lorsch had already traded or sold its holdings in Heidesheim by the time the Codex was transferred to parchment between 1183 and 1195.

A wider array of documents referring to Heidesheim only comes to light about 1150. The Altmünster Abbey at Mainz then had at its disposal extensive landholdings and half the tithes. Whether these stemmed from the Rhine Counts (Rheingrafen), as one always reads, has yet to be confirmed. Besides this, in 1145, the first holding in Walsheim (a vanished village near Heidenfahrt) passed to Eberbach Abbey, laying the groundwork for the Sandhof (see Culture and sightseeing: Buildings below). Eventually, in 1158, the Lords of Winternheim were mentioned, who later named themselves after the castle, Burg Windeck, as the Lords of Winterau. Besides these three parties, who dominate the historical records, other Mainz monastic foundations and resident families held lands and rights here.

While the Lords of Winternheim began work on Burg Windeck in the earlier half of the 12th century, the actual settlement around Saint George's Chapel apparently remained unfortified, or at least not amply so: when Archbishop Conrad of Wittelsbach was getting himself ready in 1200 to build Mainz's city wall up again after it had been razed on Emperor Friedrich I's orders in 1163, he obliged many villages in the outlying countryside to build their own respective sections. The Heidesheim dwellers had to contribute, arm and maintain five merlons, for which they enjoyed protection, defence, market rights and free buying and selling in the city.

Besides landholdings and income, Altmünster had the Heidesheim Vogtei and thereby sovereign rights over the village. Over the course of the centuries, the Vogtei passed through many holders’ hands: That it was held after 1250 by the Lords of Biegen, who gave it back to Altmünster on 13 February 1285 is clearly not so. The relevant document refers not to Heidesheim, but rather to Hattenheim in the Rheingau. Against this is that the Abbey appointed Werner von Winterau and his male heirs village Vögte on 31 January 1326. The lordly house of Winterau died out before 12 April 1372, on which day a Wilhelm von Scharpenstein was avouched as Vogt. From him the Vogtei passed on 14 July 1385 in inheritance along the male line to Dietrich Huth von Sonnenberg.

On 17 January 1414, the Archbishop of Mainz John II of Nassau documented that the abbess and convent of Altmünster at Mainz had transferred one third of the court at Heidesheim to the Archbishopric. Outside this arrangement were the Vogtei with all its appurtenances, the income and the landholdings that were part of the convent's estate. This was confirmed in writing to the convent for all time by the Archbishop with the cathedral deacon's and the cathedral capitular's consent. Moreover, Altmünster was henceforth to be freed of all contributions and levies imposed by the Archbishop or the cathedral capitular. Both pledged henceforth to protect and defend the convent with all its holdings and rights – particularly the remaining two thirds of the court at Heidesheim Der Mainzer und Magdeburger Erzbischof Kardinal Albrecht von Brandenburg bestätigte die Verfügung seines Vorgängers am 22. Oktober 1522.

Such deals, under which Mainz ecclesiastical and monastic foundations yielded sovereign rights, which they could hardly assert through their own power, to the Archbishop against assurance and protection of their ownership rights were often struck in the time that followed. In Heidesheim's case, this transfer led to the Archbishop's Amtmann appearing alongside the Altmünster convent's Vogt. Men known to have served as Archiepiscopal Amtmänner after 1414 on are, in 1481 Johann Langwerth von Simmern, and from 1565 to 1584 Mainz cathedral cantor Heinrich von Stockheim. Known Vögte from that same time are, from 1468 to 1489 Philipp von Stockheim, and from 1489 to 1524 Count Emmerich of Nassau and his male heirs, from 1524 to 1537 Ritter (“Knight”, or perhaps “Sir”) Rabe von Liebenstein, from 1537 to 1553 Hans Sifrid vom Oberstein, and from 1553, first Konrad, and then Hans Georg von Bicken. That the Amtmann and Vogt often annoyed each other can be seen in two trials fought by Heinrich von Stockheim and Hans Georg von Bicken before the Imperial Chamber Court.

When Hans Georg von Bicken found out that he would keep being denied inheritance along the male line, he asked Archbishop of Mainz Wolfgang von Dalberg on 10 November 1598 to change the Heidesheim Vogtei, which had been transferred to him and his cousins as a non-heritable fief, into a heritable fief. His request was never answered. Thus, when he died about 1608, the Vogtei passed back to Altenmünster. The convent seized the day: On advice that in these hard times they could no longer fulfil the demands that the remaining two thirds of the sovereign rights in Heidesheim required of them, the abbess and convent offered the Elector this two-thirds share. In return, the Archbishop – as had been done in 1414 and 1522 – was to protect holdings, rights and income in the village. The Archbishop accepted the transfer with the specified conditions on the very same day, which suggests that the matter had been being discussed for quite some time.

The year 1609 was a watershed in the municipality's history. Altenmünster now only held patronage rights at Saint Philip's and Saint James's Parish Church; the convent could still suggest priests and bellringers, who had to be confirmed by the Archbishop. Furthermore, in spiritual matters, the archiepiscopal vicariate general was responsible, while in worldly matters Heidesheim was under an Electoral deputy. The offices of monasterial Vogt and Electoral Amtmann were forgone. Eventually, the Electoral Chamber gave out Windeck Castle – until then the Amtmann’s seat – as a heritable asset.

== Politics ==
=== Municipal council ===
Elections in 2014:

- SPD: 8 seats
- CDU: 7 seats
- Greens: 2 seats
- FDP: 1 seat
- THE LEFT: 1 seat
- FWG: 1 seat
- BLH: 2 seats
- Total: 22 seats

=== Coat of arms ===
The municipality's arms might be described thus: Gules a cross argent surmounting a wheel of the same; Wheel of Mainz.

=== Town partnerships ===
- Auxonne, Côte-d'Or, France since 1964
- (Germany) Egstedt, Thuringia since 1990
- (Germany) Waltersleben, Thuringia since 1990

== Culture and sightseeing ==
=== Buildings ===
==== Saint George’s Chapel ====
===== Antiquity and Middle Ages =====
The Sankt Georgskapelle (Saint George's Chapel) – in Heidesheim's north between the railway line and the Autobahn from Mainz to Koblenz – is “built in the fully preserved space of a Roman villa rustica …of which today still…two walls going up under the roof, in parts with original painting on the jointing outside and wall plaster inside, are preserved.”

The chapel's roughly 1,500-year building history has led to its beginnings being uncovered only bit by bit: Long were those sought – not least of all because of Bishop Sidonius's patronage – in Frankish times. According to more recent investigations, one may presume that there was “in it a late-Antiquity country church” of the Bishop of Mainz, that not least of all because of that can be acknowledged “as an especially vital centre of Roman-Christian tradition”. “The chapel can be said to be…Rhenish Hesse’s oldest established religious structure”.

After 650, Frankish settlers came to live around Saint George's Chapel. Their descendants expanded the chapel in the late 10th and early 11th century with an apse; at this time the triumphal arch imposts were built in. Further expansions came about 1200 – from this time may stem the consecrational inscription on the lintel of the walled-up door on the south façade: “GEWEIHT AM 23. APRIL”, Saint George's Day (the first two words mean “consecrated on the”). At this time, Saint George's was the parish church.

Saint George's and its parish priest held title to a fourth of all incoming tithes in Heidesheim. From the Middle Ages two documents are known in which Saint George's Chapel is mentioned. Both stem from documents that have come down from the Eberbach Monastery, and both deal with whether the Sandhof owed the priest the aforesaid tithe. While Provost Otto von Mariengreden could claim his entitlement between April and June from 1185 to 1196 as Heidesheim's priest, an arbitrary ruling from 23 December 1278 under reference to Pope Alexander III (who had died in 1181) lays down in writing that Eberbach owed Erkenbold – “Priest of Saint George’s Church in Heisensheim” – no tithes from the Sandhof.

Once the village had been moved from the Rhine Plain onto the slope of the Dinkberg and Saint Philip's and Saint James's Parish Church had been built, Saint George's Chapel lost its status as parish church, although it was not thereby forsaken. Rather, at roughly the same time, the apse was replaced with an enclosed quire. In the 15th century came further extensive conversions. That pilgrimages had begun as early as the Middle Ages is made plain by later accounts.

===== Modern times =====
After the Thirty Years' War, Saint George's Chapel was held by Imperial Baron Philipp Erwein von Schönborn (d. 1668), who moved his family's landholdings from the Taunus to the Middle Rhine and the Main. He acquired it because of the Altmünster Convent's fourth of the tithes that were tied to it, of which sometime earlier – the exact circumstances are still unclear – Heidesheim's parish priest had been stripped by the Convent, which was furthermore towards the end of, or just after, the Thirty Years' War – as almost always – in need of money. The priest's livelihood was later disputed by the Convent, making his financial position anything but better.

In a description of the municipality put together by a Heidesheim priest between 1667 and 1677 and found in Johann Sebastian Severus's (d. 1797) Dioecesis Moguntina, it says of Saint George's Chapel:

“Also standing on the field of Heidesheim is a chapel of Saint George, built in the beginning as a building with mean stonework, later expanded because of the crowd of pilgrims streaming there and manifestly hallowed. … After Saint George’s feast here in the village is, as ever, festively celebrated, the local community proceeds there in a festive Rogation procession and attend festive Mass and sermon. In the same way dwellers of Budenheim and Finthen come here on the Rogation days (the three days before Assumption, also used for the whole week).

“As an endowment this chapel enjoys the fourth part of all tithes. And in the year 1665, it was built anew by Baron Philipp Erwein von Schönborn, who is bound as its owner to pay the priest of Heidesheim each year at Saint George’s feast for Mass and sermon two Gulden, but the choristers three Gulden. From these alms the first vespers in the chapel are also to be defrayed.”

The Heidesheim dwellers kept true to Saint George's Chapel through the centuries: when it was being rebuilt in 1665 they transported the lumber from the Rhine to the chapel and set it up there. And when the chapel burnt down again in 1776, Father Michael Priester pressed for the archiepiscopal vicariate general to work towards getting the Count of Schönborn to build it anew. Witnessing the church's Baroque décor is a statue of Saint George, which today is kept in the Heidesheim Catholic parish hall.

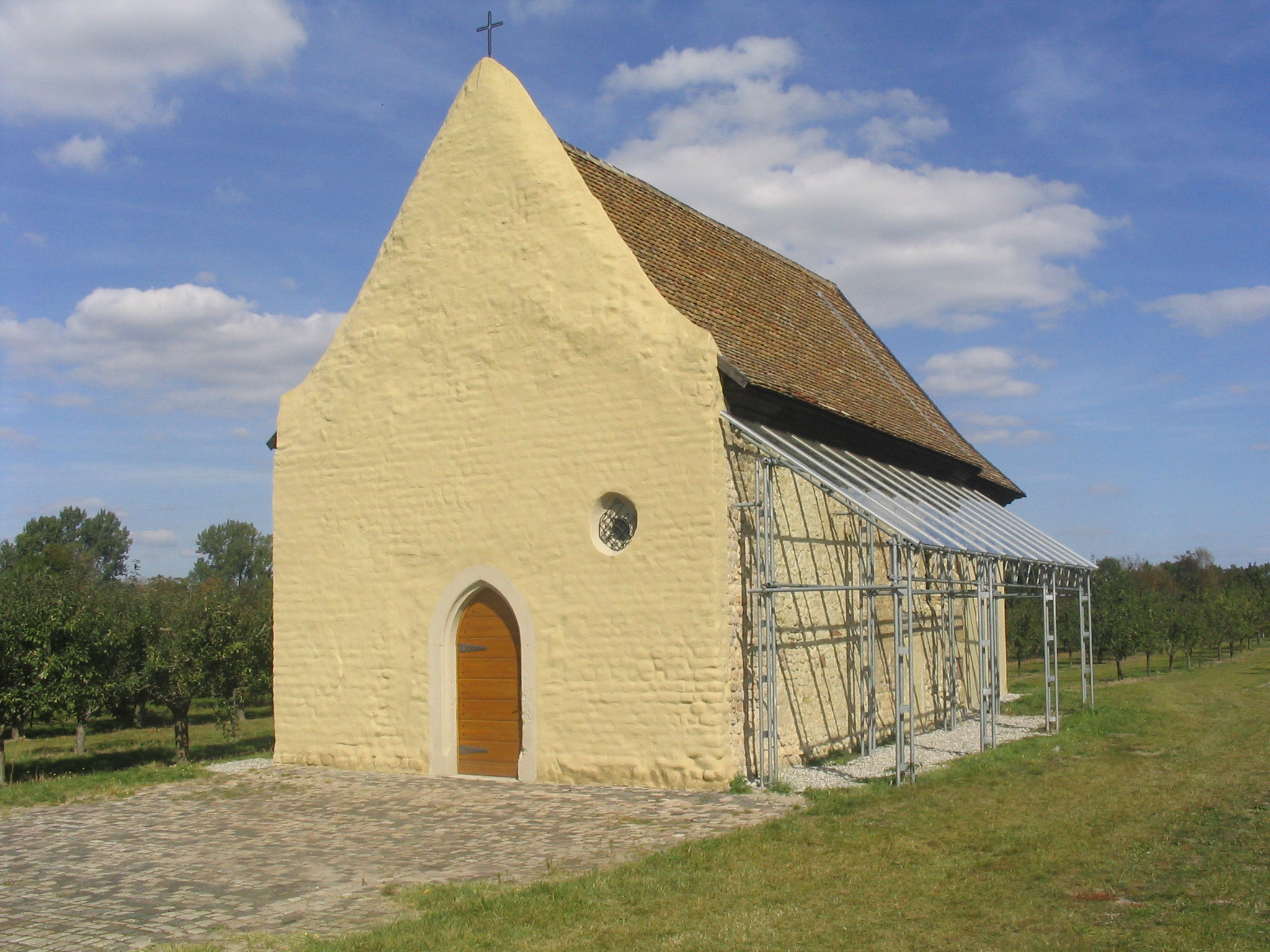
Saint George's Chapel

When France annexed the Rhine's left bank in 1797, Saint George's Chapel passed to the state. The tithes were abolished, and the pilgrimages suspended. When it was announced that the job of tearing the chapel down was to be auctioned to the highest bidder, the Heidesheim dwellers sprang to the chapel's defence: The president of the church board, the mayor and the parish priest asked the prefect of the department of Donnersberg, Jeanbon St. André, to relinquish Saint George's Chapel to the Church. The motion was granted.

Thereafter it became still around Saint George's Chapel. In the legendary handbook by Georg Dehio, the reader seeks it in vain. And in 1934, Ernst Krebs wrote:

“Thus now still stands Saint George’s sanctuary so lonely and forlorn there below as it did hundreds of years ago, and if one enters the church’s humble interior, one feels in this room as if sent back to a vanished time and only a train abruptly roaring by destroys the illusion and recalls the gap that divides the beginnings of the old place of worship from the present.

Even in the new edition of Dehio's handbook supplied by Ernst Gall, Saint George's Chapel is missing. Only in the third edition published in 1972 does one find an appraisal:

“Alone in the field northern Heidesheim, near the former Mainz-Bingen Roman road: hall structure with plain enclosed quire and profiled triumphal arch pillars, probably 10th century (cf. the imposts of the hall church in Nieder-Ingelheim). In the south wall walled-up portal with consecrational inscription on the lintel. West portal and window changed in the 15th century. Remnants of Baroque décor.”.

The public esteem for the oldest building in Heidesheim that has been growing since then. The Heidesheim saint george's promotional association has been restoring the building since 1984. Today the chapel looks to be in a good state both inside and outside, although there is yet much work to be done. It is once again being used for church services. In the coming years, the Association will be undertaking digs in the area around the chapel and thereby promoting the scientific opening of the Roman villa rustica and the settlement bound up with it.

==== Windeck Castle ====
===== The Lords of Winternheim and Lords of Winterau =====
Windeck Castle (Burg Windeck) lies in the municipality's north, south of the railway station. For centuries it stood on the village's northern edge – whence its name Wintereck or Windeck (Ecke means “corner” or “edge” – and is cognate with the latter – in German). The widely held notion that the castle was built in or about the year 1209 is something that needs to be set right. Herdegen I of Winternheim might have built the four-sided defensive tower in the middle before 1150. The arbitrary ruling from 1209, on the other hand, mentions “lands and buildings” that his like-named son, Herdegen II, “has taken away from the Brothers of Eberbach in Heidesheim and upon which he has built his house’s wall and moat”. In 1209, then, it was a castle zone expansion that was being discussed; the castle itself was already standing.

A notice from the years 1211 to 1234 shows that there was a further castle zone expansion. At that time, Herdegen – most likely a son of Herdegen II, and thereby the third who went by this name – and a man named Embricho – possibly this Herdegen's brother – from Eberbach Monastery “the part of a vineyard on which they built their castle’s moat”. Windeck might have looked much as Karl Bronner has reconstructed it no later than that: in the centre the four-sided tower with entrance and wooden parapet eight metres high, girded by an inner wall with a moat and an outer wall, through which flowed either the Sülzbach or the flood channel. Between the walls stood living and working buildings. The core may only have served as a refuge, as suggested by the tower's limited land area and its difficult access.

Whether the Lords of Winternheim came from Groß-Winternheim or Klein-Winternheim cannot be answered without further investigation. In 1235 they were named for the first time as the Lords of Winterau and thereby by the name that they bore in the time that followed. Father Hermann Bär has carefully uttered the assumption hitherto held up as certainty that the Lords’ estate before the middle of the 13th century passed by way of a daughter of the house temporarily to the Lords of Leien. In so doing he refers to a document by which the brothers Philipp, Friedrich and Heinrich of Leien ceded for themselves and their heirs all rights at the Sandhof to Eberbach Monastery, which for its part forwent all levies that it had imposed on them and their father.

Hermann Bär and those who follow him, though, have something working against them: First, it is unclear whether in the document in question it actually says milites in Leien, as it might rather be a question of an abbreviation mark over one of the I's, which would yield milites in Leheim instead. Thus it is with a later remark on the back of the document. Therefore, it has not been determined what rights the document was dealing with at all. Whatever the truth, the Lords of Winterau had already ceded the Vogtei rights that they had held over nine and a half Hufen of the Sandhof to the monks of Eberbach in 1209. Above all, though, Herdegen III of Winterauis named as a witness in documents issued in 1242 and 1255.

The Lords of Winterau owned and lived at Windeck Castle from their beginnings before 1150 up until the family died out in the latter half of the 14th century. In 1326 the Convent of Altmünster at Mainz enfeoffed them with its Vogtei in Heidesheim. In a judgment from 12 April 1372, Wilhelm von Scharpenstein is named as Vogt of the court of Heidesheim and a hern Wernher selgen von Wynthirauwe is named as his neighbour. The word selgen there means “late” – the House of Winterau was no more.

===== 15th to 20th century =====
To whom Windeck Castle passed once the Lords of Winterau were gone is shrouded in darkness. Perhaps it ended up with the Altmünster Convent, which might then have passed it on in 1414, together with a third of the Heidesheim court, to Archbishop of Mainz John II of Nassau. In 1481, the archiepiscopal Amtmann of Heidesheim, Johann Langwert von Simmern, lived at the castle. His successor, Heinrich von Stockheim, had his own seat built after 1577 in the form of the Schlossmühle (“Castle Mill”). Whether his successor moved back into the castle is uncertain. Whatever happened, Windeck was still owned by the Court Chamber (Hofkammer), which then granted Samuel Becker, the cellarmaster (winemaker) at the Martinsburg (a now vanished castle) at Mainz the castle, the estate and the eighth of the Heidesheim tithes that came along with those in 1629, as a heritable holding.

In the description of the Parish of Heidesheim drawn up sometime between 1667 and 1677 in Johann Sebastian Severus's Dioecesis Moguntina, it says:

“On the edge of the village towards the Rhine one beholds farther away the castle house at the Wintereck which in the year 1626 Samuel Beck, chief cellarmaster at Mainz, acquired for himself and his family along with the forest, meadows, fields and cereal tributes for 800 Gulden and today has outfitted with an appealing building and fruit trees.

Towards the end of the Thirty Years' War, the notorious cavalry general Johann von Werth is said to have lived at the castle. After 1650, it ended up with the Barons of Bockenheim, who thereafter held it for roughly 150 years on a heritable lease. The family had entitlement to pewage and burial in the parish church.

When the French occupied Electoral Mainz on 21 October 1793, Windeck Castle, as an ecclesiastical and noble holding, was seized. The von Bockenheim family emigrated to Austria. Only Katharina Elisabeth von Bockenheim stayed in Heidesheim, where in 1844 she died at the great age of 95. The Windeck was auctioned off sometime in 1802 or 1803 as state property. The new owner was a Wackernheim townsman named Radicke. His widow handed the property on to the Mainz businessmen Reinach and Popp, who in the second fourth of the 19th century kept a tannery there. In the 1860s, the family Krebs acquired the Windeck. Otto Krebs ran a winery in it with an inn. After 1908, beginning with Christmas, the Evangelical parish held its church services in the hall on the ground floor. In 1984, the castle was, as once before, a private home.

At the time of the Lords of Winterau, the castle's outer girding wall enclosed an extensive area, as still witnessed today by the cadastral names Hinter den Ziunen or Hinter den Zäunen (“Behind the Fences”) and In der Zingel or In der Ringmauer (“In the Girding Wall”). After the Thirty Years' War, the citizens of Heidesheim began to use this wall as a quarry, tearing it down in the process. Andreas Trauttner's 1754 map shows the Windeck already in the shape seen today. The originally open area between the tower and the inner wall is covered by a gabled roof and thus used as a stately home stretching across the north, east and southeast around the tower. In the southwest and west, the wall has been levelled, through which the tower on the building's western edge rises. It is likely that Samuel Beck gave it this shape after 1626. The ogival-arch portal and the large-scale crossbar windows (windows divided by cross-shaped spars into groups of four windows) in Gothic Revival style stem from the time after 1860, as does the room layout inside. The outbuildings shown in the cadastral plans from 1812 and from 1841 to 1843 have disappeared.

When the municipality of Heidesheim acquired Windeck Castle in 1993, it was in a state of ruin. Since then, the municipality has undertaken works to bring the building into a maintained state: First, the roof framework and the roof, and then the entrance doors and windows were renovated. The building was plastered, given a coat of Mainz red from the Late Middle Ages, and the tower was decorated in natural colours. Finally, a staircase was built into the tower, which leads up to the former roof level with its view. In its efforts to raise the Windeck from its ruins, the municipality is supported by the club Heimatmuseum Burg Windeck e.V.. Volunteer helpers take care of this property.

==== The Castle Mill ====
===== The Lords of Winterau, of Stockheim and of the Leyen (1317-1793) =====
The Castle Mill (Schlossmühle) lies at Heidesheim's southwest edge at the foot of the cadastral area of Sommerau. There Sir Werner of Winterau owned land that he bequeathed to his sons in his will of 16 August 1317. Ernst Krebs has presumed that on the Castle Mill's lands was a farm whose land was already being worked by Sir Werner's forebear Herdegen II. That he moved from there to the castle in 1209 does not make sense – on 27 October 1577, Hans Georg von Bicken (d. 1608) sold Heinrich von Stockheim (d. 1588) the Castle Mill area. Hans Georg von Bicken, from the family Bicken, was the Electoral Mainz vicegerent (Vitztum) in the Rheingau and Vogt of the Mainz Convent of Altmünster in Heidesheim; Heinrich von Stockheim was cathedral cantor at Mainz, povost of Saint Alban's Abbey there and Electoral Amtmann in Heidesheim.

In the years that followed, Heinrich von Stockheim had the still-preserved Renaissance building and the adjoining chapel tower built on the site of a simple mill building. They served him as an official seat and a dwelling. At the same time the main building housed a mill that with surrounding barns and stables formed an economic hub of extensive lands and of rich revenues, which Heinrich von Stockheim acquired in Heidesheim beginning in 1565.

In the description of the Parish of Heidesheim drawn up sometime between 1667 and 1677 in Johann Sebastian Severus's Dioecesis Moguntina, it says of the Castle Mill:

“Incidentally, an important mill is vaunted – with a great house, barns and stalls, garden and other appurtenances. It was built in 1577 by a member of the family Stockheim, who was cathedral cantor in Mainz and village Amtmann.”

The Castle Mill remained in Heinrich von Stockheim's heirs’ ownership until Kurt von Lützow and his son Ernst Christoph sold the Stockheimische Wohnhaus on 28 September 1677 along with appurtenances, holdings and revenue in Heidesheim, Framersheim, Gau-Bickelheim and Selzen (near Alzey) to Elector of Mainz Damian Hartard von der Leyen (d. 1678) and his heirs. Thereafter the property found itself owned by the Lords – beginning in 1711 Counts – of the Leyen, who administered their scattered holdings on the Moselle and the Rhine first from Koblenz and beginning in 1773 from Blieskastel (Saarpfalz) and gave out the Castle Mill on a heritable lease. Information about the time from 1677 to 1793 is promised by the contents of the archives of the (beginning in 1806) Princes of the Leyen, which in 1995 ended up in the Rhineland-Palatinate Main State Archive in Koblenz, but hitherto not much of this information has been forthcoming.

===== The dark 19th century, Krebs, Schön, Schmidt (1793-1920) =====
From the end of the 18th on into the latter half of the 19th century, the Castle Mill's ownership history raises more questions than it answers: on 21 October 1793, French Revolutionary troops occupied Electoral Mainz; on 4 November 1797, France annexed the Rhine's left bank; on 9 February 1801 the German Empire ceded the area to France in the Treaty of Lunéville. Noble and ecclesiastical holdings were seized for the French State and publicly auctioned. Whether or not the Castle Mill met with this fate, it was restored on 25 June 1804 by Napoleon to Count Philipp Franz von der Leyen (d. 1829), and he later sold it – no later than 1820 – when the prince was getting rid of his last holdings on the Middle Rhine, only to acquire Schloss Waal (a castle in Ostallgäu) a few years later.

The archives of the Princes of the Leyen are yielding as little about the upheavals of the French Revolution and the Napoleonic Wars as about the time before this, and as for the decades that followed, no information is forthcoming about the Castle Mill. Although the cadastral plans from 1812 and 1841 to 1843 offer a scale drawing of the property, they say nothing about the castle's owners. The municipality's cadastral register lays down in writing on 26 July 1865 that the estate owners were August Krebs (d. 1905?) and his wife Elisabeth, née Schmahl, who had acquired the Castle Mill by way of trade – from whom it is unknown.

Karl Sturm reports that Klara Fauerbach owned a notarielle Beurkundung (“notarized certification”) about 1970 according to which her grandfather August Krebs “bought the Castle Mill property on 4 February 1870 for 22,000 Gulden from Franz Hembes, mayor and estate owner in Ober-Olm, who had earlier acquired it from the miller Michael Hembes for 20,000 Gulden. According to information from Mrs. Fauerbach, her grandparents were then in possession of the property until 1905…”. Since the buying and selling dates and the circumstances of the transaction are at odds with the official data in the cadastral register, the whole business must be approached with caution.

August Krebs ran on the lands, besides agricultural operations, three mills: one sawmill, which was most likely housed in the southwest in the area bordering the Praumenmühle (not one of his mills), a gristmill, which without doubt was housed in the main building, and an oil mill, which might have been found in the little quarrystone building in the north leaning against the property's west perimeter wall and dating from before 1841. As the J. Schmitt steam mill in Mainz-Mombach expanded in the early years of the 20th century, the traditional watermills in the area became ever less profitable, and August Krebs's mills shut down as surely as the rest. It is likely that they stopped running with his death.

On 17 June 1918 August Krebs's heirs sold the Castle Mill for 48,000 paper marks or 38,400 gold marks to the Wiesbaden engineer Michael Schön and his wife Maria Susanna, née Zahn. They sold it again only a year later, on 25 June 1919 for 62,500 paper marks or 19,437 gold marks – and 50 Pfennigs – to the Wiesbaden master painter Karl Schmidt and his wife Luise, née Krüger, who provided the rather shabby building with a coat of paint, but less than a year later they sold it again, on 7 May 1920 for 180,000 paper marks or 15,822 gold marks, to the Wiesbaden court apothecary Max Holländer.

The prices that Michael Schön and Karl Schmidt paid for the Castle Mill and for which they sold it bespeak their use of the property at the end of the First World War in the run on tangible assets or for speculation. Neither took any measures to move his household to Heidesheim, and instead let the building. Not so Max Holländer; for health reasons he was obliged to flee the Wiesbaden climate and move with his wife into the Castle Mill. Wealth was obviously something that he did not lack.

===== Max and Sofie Holländer (1920-1929) Max and Johanna Hollander (1930-1938) =====
In the years after 1920 to 1929 Max and Sofie Holländer shaped the ruined Castle Mill into a true jewel. In 1929 Max and Sofie Hollander divorced and in 1930 Max Hollander married Johanna Hollander. In 1934, Nikolaus Haupt reported in the municipality's newssheet about the renovation:

“It was carried out from the mighty cellar vaults with the foundation, which here and there is more than two metres thick, up to the loft and it was worked in a radical way. From the three-floor loft, the lower floor was also expanded into dwelling rooms. The important works were performed almost wholly by Heidesheim tradesmen. In the main it is a matter of artistic wall and ceiling coverings, which are made to match the building’s character and which have already enjoyed much attention and approval from professionals. The works are an honorific attestation for former applied arts student and now master joiner Peter Schlitz’s mastery and achievement here.

“In the left wing beside the main building’s entrance is found the former Castle Chapel, a rectangular room with two dainty cross vaults resting in the middle on a column. Even this the owner has in mind to have converted to its former purpose. The property thus represents as a whole through the renovation and careful handling an important jewel within the municipality of Heidesheim.”

In 1938, when Max Holländer had to accept that as a Jew he could no longer remain in Germany, he announced:

“Castle property on the Rhine for sale immediately, Near Mainz! Renaissance building under conservation! Enthusiast’s item! Rarity value! The property, some 5 minutes away from the railway station – Basel-Holland, Frankfurt-Paris lines – forms a complete whole in one plan, utterly enclosed, and comprises over 11 000 m² estate area, built-up area, orchard and vegetable garden (choice fruit, almond trees, choice chestnuts), 2 work buildings supplied by heat from the house. The property has its own spring flowing through it, so that the garden is watered with its own water. The spring can also be used to generate electric power.

“The castle, a Renaissance building from the time about 1160, in finished quarrystones with quoins at the corners, steep slate roof and high Renaissance gables, contains the following: In the cellar: vaulted stock cellar, wine cellar, heating cellar with coke cellar (water heating); on the ground floor: entrance hall, reception room, 4 spacious rooms, 2 maids’ rooms, adjoining bath for household servants, WC; on the first floor: 4 spacious livingrooms, 2 kitchen rooms, 1 ironing room, WC; on the second floor: 5 spacious livingrooms/bedrooms, bath, WC; in the loft: floor space (woodwork made of heavy oak); 1 side building contains: washkitchen, gardener’s dwelling, storage space; 1 stable building contains: stable (for horses and cattle, swine), garage, hay floor; 1 further side building contains: chicken coop, equipment room – electric lighting, gas, sewerage, bath, in the rooms running warm and cold water, heating, telephone, radio at hand.

“Of high artistic and historical worth is the tasteful interior décor, which also matches the castle’s building style, of individual rooms with wall and ceiling coverings made of wood, in parts velvet covering on the room walls, as well as the genuine-style furnishings, which also fit the house’s character, of individual rooms. With much artistic taste and finest style sensitivity the owner has decorated the property. Wonderful master paintings, much genuine carpets and much more complete the whole image of this property, whose uniqueness and cultural-historical worth is marked by the fact that the castle has been placed under conservation…”

It was not enough that Max and Sofie and Johanna Holländer supplied work to Heidesheim craftsmen in economically hard times; they had to further prove themselves worthy, and this they did lavishly: Max Holländer – if not wholly selflessly – had the Grabenstraße (road) paved at his own expense, on which his chauffeur drove him to Wiesbaden each morning and back in the evening. And at Christmastime, Mrs. Hollander went with a basket on her arm down the Grabenstraße, to give gifts out to the children. Older fellow citizens remember today: “a good-hearted woman!” The impositions against the couple as Jews that had been happening since 1933 grew even worse:

After the Second World War, Johanna Holländer reported that already in May 1933, the Bingen Gestapo were extorting money from her husband and her. One month later the mayor of Heidesheim arrested Max Holländer, whom his driver had denounced, and transferred him to Osthofen concentration camp. After a few weeks, he was moved to the prison there, where his wife was also being held. After almost ten weeks, both were allowed to betake themselves, under police supervision, to a sanatorium in Bad Nauheim. In late September 1933, the Mainz regional court acquitted the couple.

Beginning on 1 April 1934, Max and Johanna Holländer lived once again at the Castle Mill. The municipal administration's chicanery, though, steadily grew. In 1938 the couple wanted to sell the property pu blicly (see above) – too late. On 10 November 1938 – the day after Kristallnacht – Max and Johanna Holländer were sitting on packed cases when the Gestapo and municipal officials violently forced their way into the Castle Mill, arrested Max Holländer and took him to the Town Hall. There, the mayor, a councillor and a notary forced him under duress to donate his whole estate to the municipality.

At the same time the couple had to give notice in Heidesheim of their departure and go to Wiesbaden on the next train. There, Max Holländer was arrested at the railway station and taken to Buchenwald concentration camp. Released after 14 days, the couple managed to emigrate in late May 1939. Their way led through the Philippines to New York, where on 10 December 1941, Max Holländer died.

===== Municipality of Heidesheim (1938-1956) =====
As early as 11 November 1938, the day after Max and Johanna Holländer's arrest, there appeared an article in the Gau-Algesheim, Heidesheim and Wackernheim community newssheet under the headline “An Old Historical Building in Ownership of Municipality of Heidesheim”; it could hardly have been full of more hypocrisy and spite:

“The Castle Mill – the oldest building of the Municipality of Heidesheim – passed on 10 November as a donation into the ownership of the Municipality of Heidesheim. Yesterday, 12:45, the owner up to now, Max Holländer, made the building over to the municipality’s ownership through a provisional agreement – of his own free will and influenced by no party. And thus has the long-fostered wish for the property one day to pass to the municipality become reality. Holländer for a long time had the thought of putting the building at the disposal of the Municipality of Heidesheim.”

On the Sunday after Max and Johanna Holländer had been driven out – 20 November 1938 – the municipality opened the Castle Mill with admission at ten Pfennigs so that the citizens could themselves get an idea of the opulence in which the Jews “splurged”, while ethnic Germans were starving. More than 1,000 people gathered. So big was the throng that the spectacle was repeated the next Sunday “by popular demand”.

Thereafter it became oddly quiet about the Castle Mill. Obviously the municipality knew that it had started nothing right with its long yearned-for property, the more so as the Bingen district office brought the donation into doubt, since it was against Nazi principles – if such things could be said to exist – to accept gifts from Jews. Only in 1940 were the ownership relationships clarified, when the Municipality of Heidesheim paid 3,930 Reichsmark into “emigrant” Max Holländer's frozen account, thus changing the apparent donation into a sale. The municipality, though, had long before let out the Castle Mill to the military authorities in Mainz for dwelling purposes. There followed bombed-out families and refugees from Mainz – all in all up to eight parties.

After the end of the Second World War, Johanna Holländer filed suit – obviously from New York – on 20 May 1949 for compensation. In the case of the Castle Mill she sought to get it back and to be paid damages in the amount of DM100,000. Once she had come back to Wiesbaden, the embittered woman pursued the case doggedly and forcefully. When on 22 July 1954 the Fifth Civil Chamber of the Mainz Regional Court awarded her the Castle Mill and damages amounting to DM49,400 together with 4% interest since 20 May 1949, she launched an appeal.

The case was long and drawn out and ended in a settlement, which after a series of expert opinions and various crime scene visits was drawn up on 19 November 1956 after being suggested by the Chief Magistrate presiding at the Third Civil Senate of the Koblenz Chief State Court. Johanna Holländer got the Castle Mill back together with the originally sought damages of DM100,000 and 4% interest since 20 May 1949. Together with the cost of the legal battle, the Municipality of Heidesheim had roughly DM150,000 to bear in costs.

===== Johanna Holländer and C. H. Boehringer Sohn (1956-present) =====
On 26 April 1957, Mayor Joseph Dillmann made a declaration of bankruptcy in the municipality's newssheet:

“After the speech by the municipality’s legal representative before municipal council, it has after due consideration and with a heavy heart accepted the settlement. Given the municipality’s weak legal position, however, the legal dispute, which went on for 7 years, can no longer be further pursued. The damage sum is only a substitute for the damages that the municipality must answer for; the Castle Mill remains the plaintiff’s property. The damage award comprises the compensation of the damage in buildings, gardening facilities and lost use.

“Through this financial burden the municipality’s budgetary economy is being put before some burdensome challenges. Nevertheless, the challenges necessary for the municipality’s further development must be continued. The damage sum can only be covered through the assumption of a short-term municipal credit. Amortization and interest payment must be dealt with out of the regular budget. An increase in property and business tax to 200 or 300 percent of the average state rates therefore cannot be avoided.”

And then came the late confession:

“Perhaps those who are also responsible will recognize the injustice in which they – perhaps unwittingly – have been complicit, and that they have brought the municipality untold harm. It is needless to want to gloss over anything. It was a crime and the whole municipality must bear the consequences. Unfortunately, the main culprit cannot be held liable for compensation, since he owns nothing.”

The rest of the story can be told quickly: Whether Johanna Holländer ever saw the Castle Mill again is questionable. She had whatever still seemed usable fetched from the property. It was rather little, for the wood panelling had been used in the years of need after the war as firewood, and the velvet coverings on the walls had been made into children's clothing. Besides that she settled for the income from the ongoing rental that the utterly ruined property was still bringing in.

Johanna Holländer died sometime before 29 January 1969. On this day the Castle Mill was entered in the Heidesheim register as belonging to her heirs: half went to each of the State League of Jewish Communities in Hesse (Landesverband der Jüdischen Gemeinde in Hessen) and Irgim Olèg Merkaz Europa in Tel Aviv. They could do little with the property and were glad when on 11 March 1970 it was sold off to Heidesheim building entrepreneur Theodor Kiese. Only a fortnight later, he passed it on to the Ingelheim pharmaceutical firm C. H. Boehringer Sohn.

C. H. Boehringer Sohn had the thoroughly run-down property renovated from the ground up as a representative residence for a member of the company's board. When work had already proceeded to a great extent, the main and side buildings burnt down to the foundations and outer walls on 1 September 1971. The question of guilt was never settled. Under the monument authority's strict conditions, C. H. Boehringer Sohn built the Castle Mill anew. From 1976 to 2000, the main building was used for presentations and seminars. Since 2000 it has housed the office of the business association's and shareholders’ foundations: Boehringer Ingelheim Fonds, foundation for basic medical research; Boehringer Ingelheim Stiftung; and Geschwister Boehringer Ingelheim, foundation for the humanities.

==== Jewish graveyard ====
See: Dieter Krienke, ed., Kreis Mainz-Bingen. Städte Bingen und Ingelheim, Gemeinde Budenheim, Verbandsgemeinden Gau-Algesheim, Heidesheim, Rhein-Nahe und Sprendlingen-Gensingen, Worms 2007 (=Denkmaltopographie Bundesrepublik Deutschland, Kulturdenkmäler Rheinland-Pfalz, Bd. 18.1) S. 322.

=== Regular events ===
On the first Sunday in May, the kermis (church consecration festival, locally known as the Kerb) is held. The first Sunday in October is the time for the Harvest Festival (Erntedankfest) with a major parade, an exhibition of fruits and agricultural products and visits from partner towns in France and Germany.

=== Clubs ===
Like many German villages and small towns, Heidesheim is home to many associations, clubs and groups, in German known as "Vereine". They are a major part of civic life and cover many aspects of people's leisure time:

1. Sports association with many divisions, e.g. soccer, hockey, athletics, tennis 2. Choirs: men's, ladies’ and children's choirs, church choirs and mixed choirs 3. Marching bands offer regular concerts, perform at local and regional festivities and provide extensive training for young people aspiring to master musical instruments. 4. Church youth and adult groups cover all ages and both sexes. Examples are KJG and KFD 5. Special interest clubs exist for dog owners, poultry, chess, the preservation of historical monuments (especially Saint George's Chapel), photography, and so on.

== Economy and infrastructure ==
=== Transport ===
Heidesheim lies on the Autobahn A 60, which can be reached through interchanges 16 (west) and 17 (east).

Through the two railway stations Uhlerborn and Heidesheim (Rheinhessen), there are two connections to local rail transport on the West Rhine Railway (KBS 470). The two nearest long-distance railway stations are Bingen and Mainz Hauptbahnhof.

Heidesheim is also linked to the Ingelheim/Mainz bus system (route 620), which runs to Ingelheim in the west and to Budenheim, Mainz Mombach and Mainz Hauptbahnhof in the east, therefore fundamentally following the same route as the train. Thus far there is still no direct bus link to the neighbouring Mainz constituent communities of Gonsenheim and Finthen. There are initiatives, though.

=== Established businesses ===
In the Uhlerborn commercial area are found a gardening centre (Dehner), two supermarkets (Aldi, Edeka) and two bakeries. Moreover, there are a printshop, a carpentry shop, a building firm and a few smaller businesses.

=== Education ===
- Primary school and Hauptschule

== Famous people ==
=== Sons and daughters of the town ===
- Joseph Kehrein, teacher, philologist and historian
- Gerhard Schreeb, youth politician and college lecturer
