= Heidesheim am Rhein (Verbandsgemeinde) =

Former Verbandsgemeinde in Rhineland-Palatinate, Germany

- Former Verbandsgemeinde
- Interactive map of Heidesheim am Rhein
- Coordinates: 50.000°N 8.133°E
- Country: Germany
- State: Rhineland-Palatinate
- District: Mainz-Bingen
- Dissolved: 1 July 2019
- Seat: Heidesheim am Rhein

Heidesheim am Rhein is a former Verbandsgemeinde ("collective municipality") in the district Mainz-Bingen in Rhineland-Palatinate, Germany. The seat of the Verbandsgemeinde was in Heidesheim am Rhein. In 2010 a reform of the communal structure was requested by the Rhineland-Palatinate government. As a result of this on 1 July 2019 Wackernheim and Heidesheim were incorporated into the city of Ingelheim am Rhein.

The Verbandsgemeinde Heidesheim am Rhein consisted of the following Ortsgemeinden ("local municipalities"):

1. Heidesheim am Rhein
2. Wackernheim
