= Larry Burdick =

American confectioner (born 1956)

- Born: 1956 (age 69–70)
- Occupation: confectioner
- Known for: founding L.A. Burdick
- Spouse: Paula Burdick

Lawrence Burdick (born 1956) is an American confectioner and businessman. In 1987, he and his wife established L.A. Burdick, a chocalatier, and opened their first store in New York City. As of 2026, it has seven locations in the United States.

== Early life ==
In the late 1970s, after training as a pastry chef in New York City, Burdick worked as a chocolatier in Bern, Switzerland. Upon completing his training, he returned to the United States and began offering a variety of luxury products, such as truffles, bonbons, his signature chocolate mice, and an assortment of hot chocolate powders specifically to high-end restaurants. He wanted to create chocolate confections that showed the quality of chocolate. He knew that the majority of chocolate in the United States was mass-produced, using low-quality cocoa and high amounts of sugar for flavor. This realization motivated him to bring about a change in the chocolate industry in the United States.

== Career ==
In 1987, Burdick and his wife, Paula, established began making chocolates in their New York City apartment. Shortly thereafter they opened their a store, having named it L.A. Burdick, in the city's Upper East Side. Five years later, he and his family moved the business to Walpole, New Hampshire, for logistic reasons: to be closer to the source of the ingredients for his products. Filmmaker and fellow Walpole resident Ken Burns helped finance the Burdicks' move to larger premises in the town. From there, they continued to expand their reach, opening additional locations in Massachusetts and other parts of the United States. As of 2026, it has seven locations in the United States.

He is a co-owner of Jouvay Chocolate, a cocoa farm in Grenada, along with his wife and Andrew Hastick. It is made at Diamond Chocolate Factory.

== Personal life ==
Burdick is married to Paula, who founded the Cocoa Farming Future Initiative in 2011. She also has a degree in fashion from the Fashion Institute of Technology.
