= Montabaur Castle =

Landmark in Germany

Coordinates: 50°26′20″N 7°49′35″E

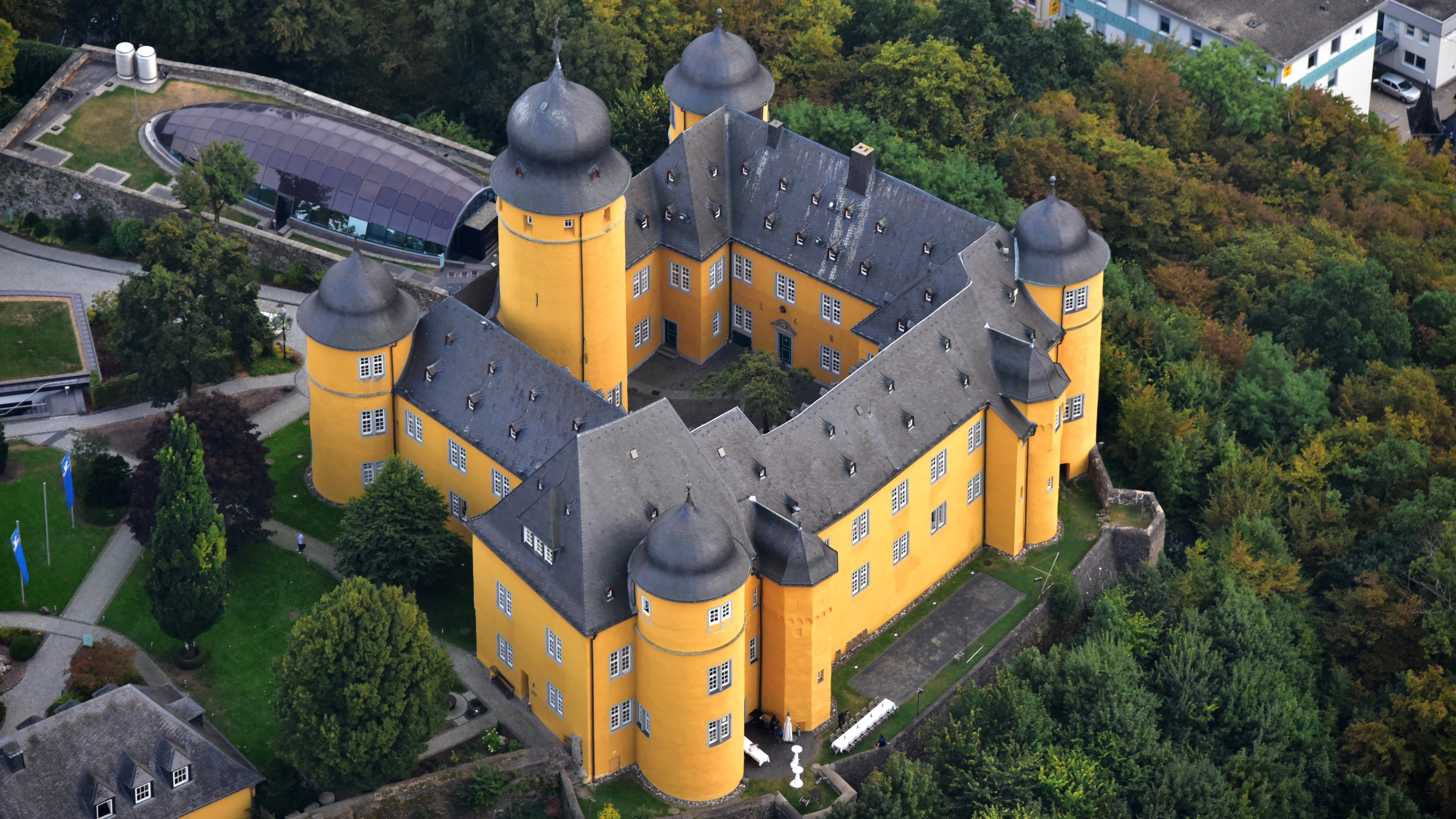
Montabaur Castle, detailed view, aerial photograph (2016)

Montabaur Castle (Schloss Montabaur) is a landmark in the town of Montabaur, a town and the district seat of the Westerwaldkreis in Rhineland-Palatinate, Germany. It stands prominently in the town center on the Schlossberg hill at an elevation of 321 meters above sea level and today serves as a training and conference center for the Academy of German Cooperatives.

== Description ==
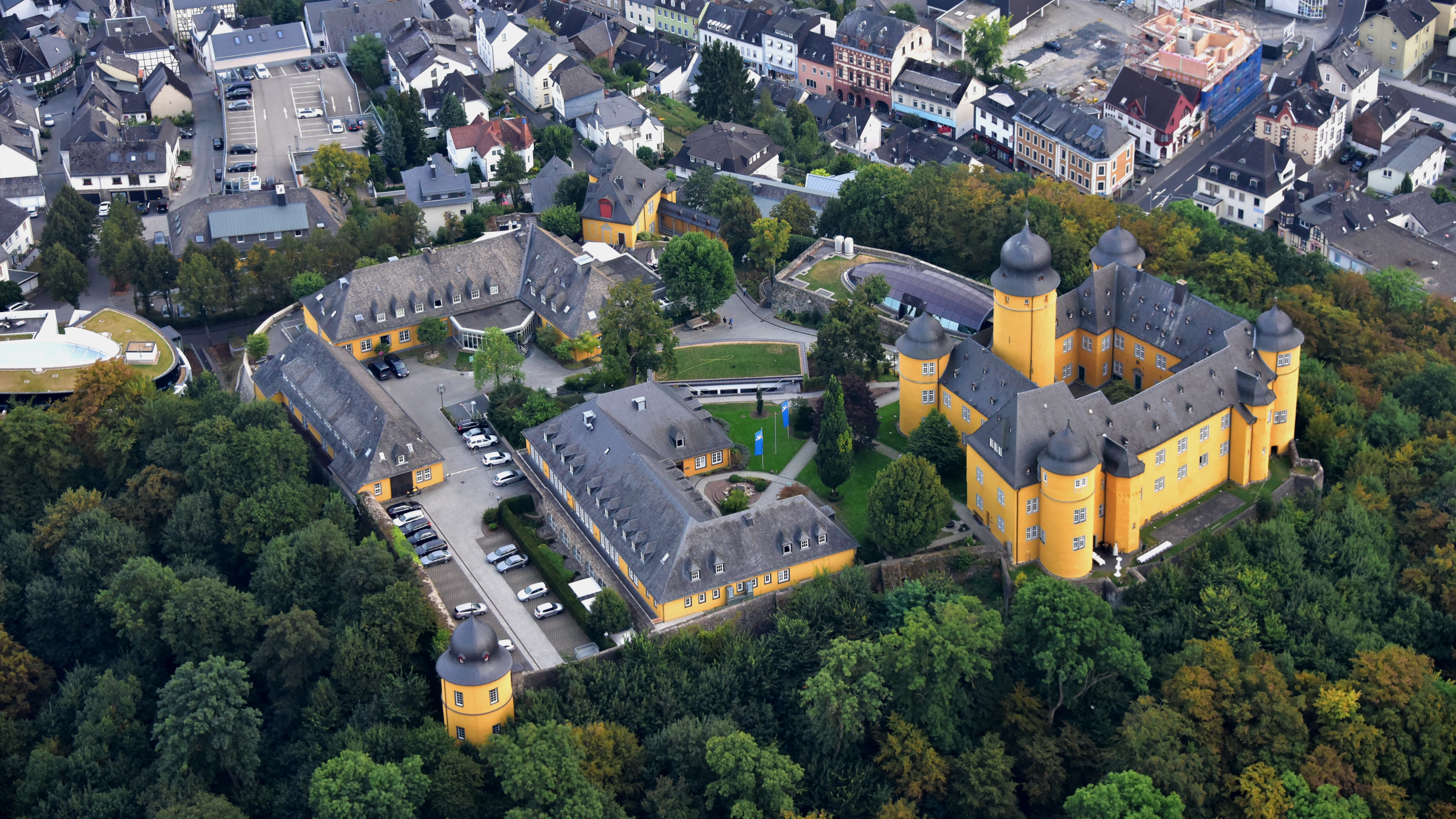
Montabaur Castle, aerial photograph (2016)

The castle consists of an outer bailey and a two-story main building, which, with its four wings, encloses an almost square courtyard. At the corners, it has three-story round towers with flat, curved domes. Its medieval keep is 33 meters high. On the courtyard side, three stair towers protrude from the yellow-painted facade.

The palace complex also includes several individual buildings, including the Zwinger, which was redesigned in the Baroque style, the stables from 1720 and the outer gate building, which dates back to 1588.

== History ==
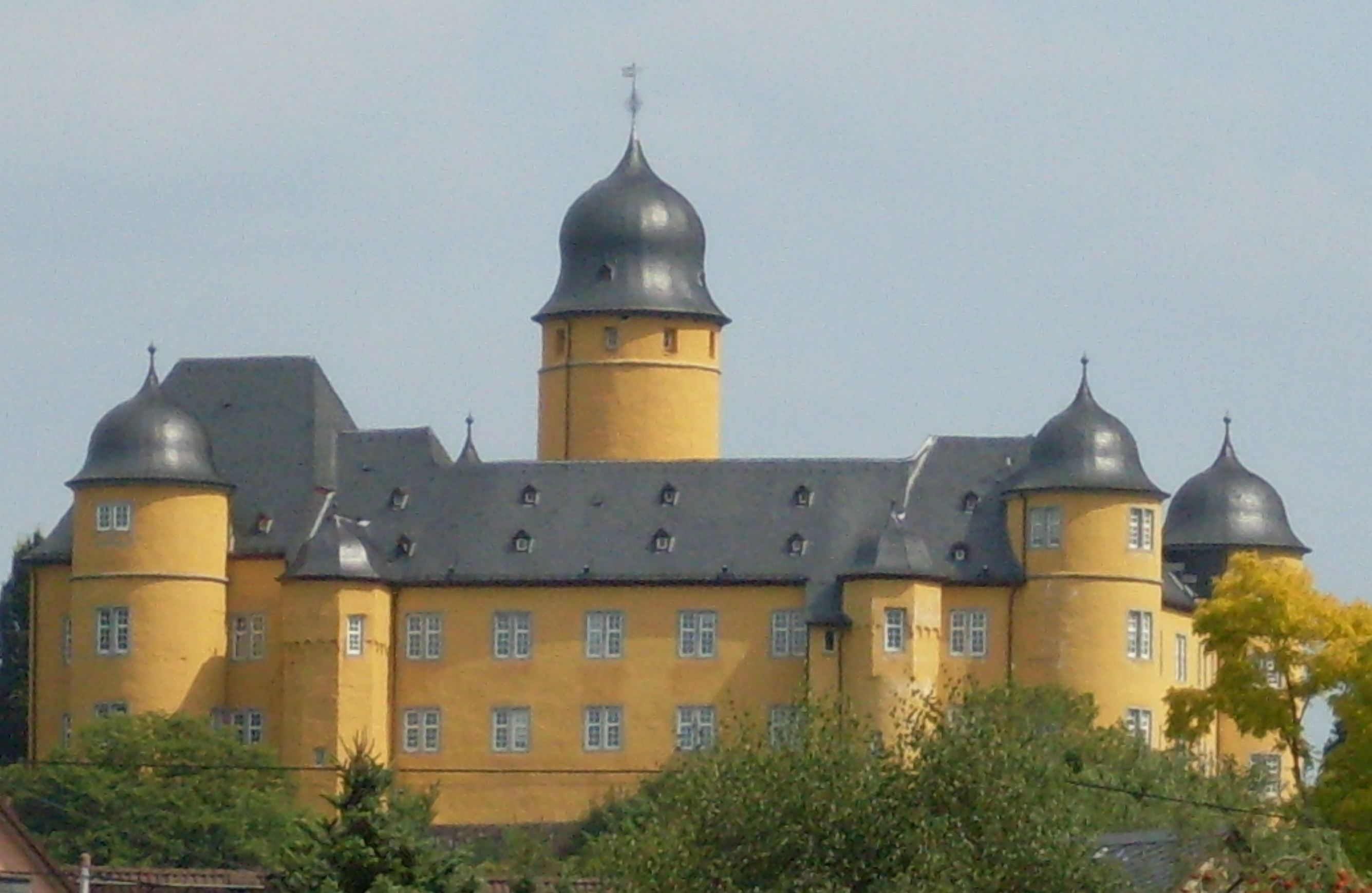
Montabaur Castle (2008)

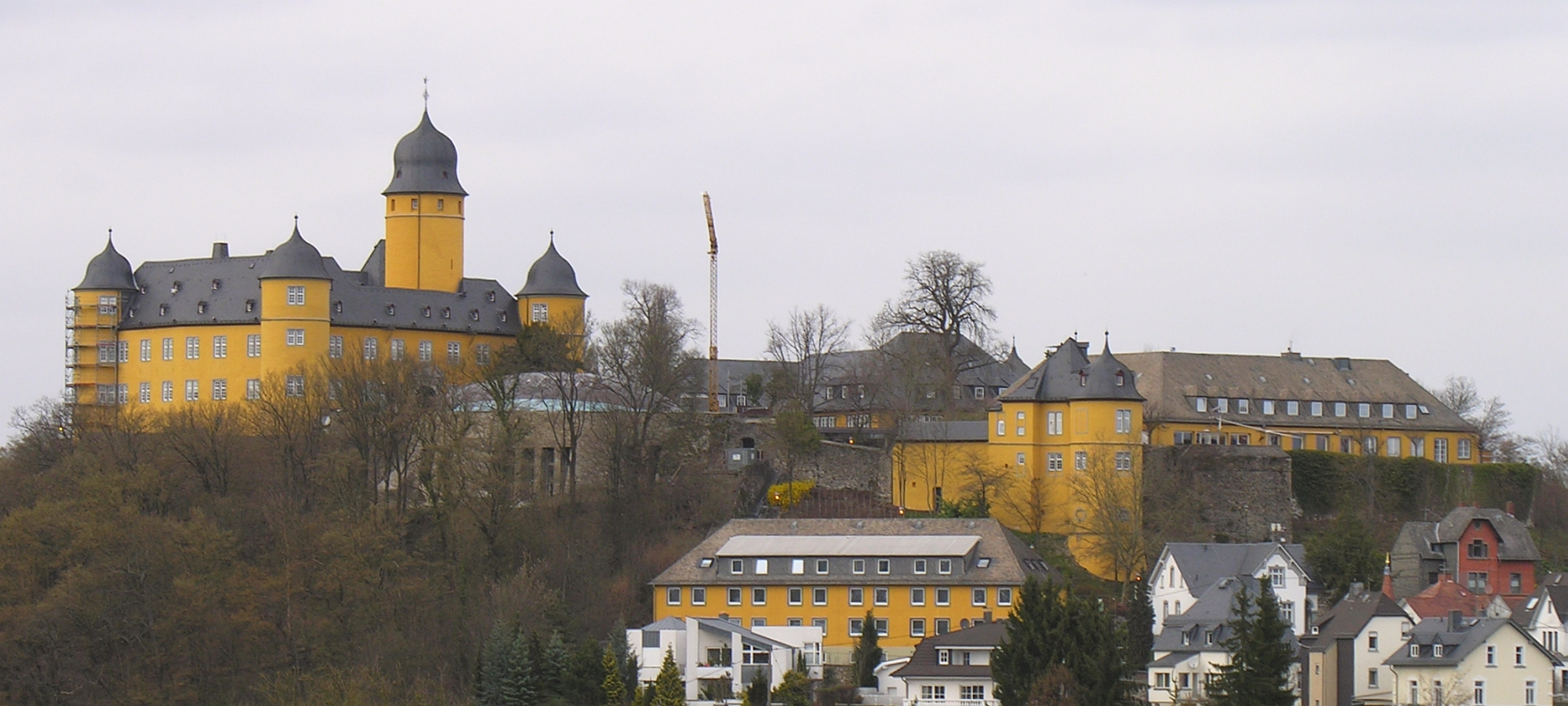
A distinctive cityscape: the castle in the center of Montabaur with the castle complex (2011)

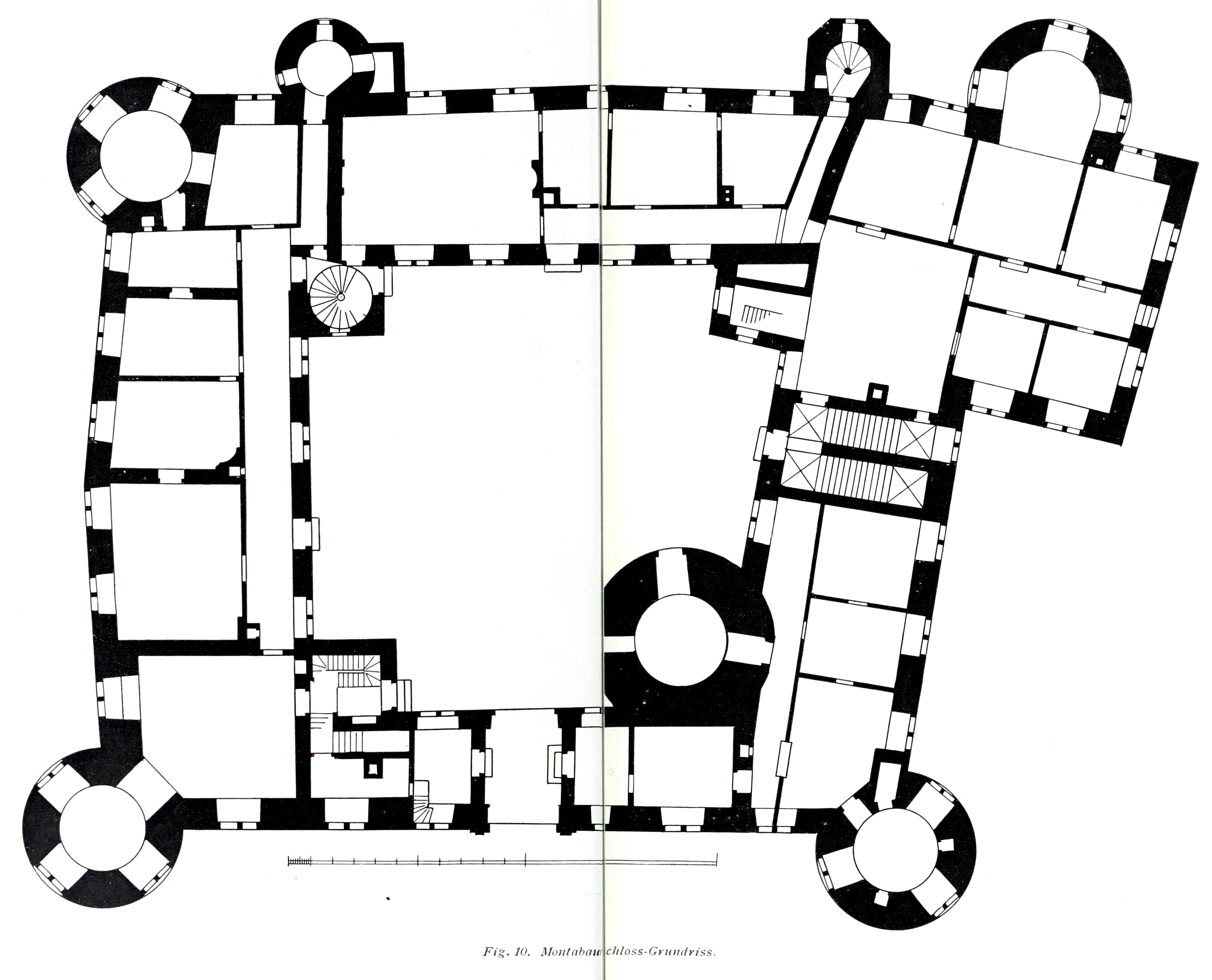
Ground plan of the castle (drawn before 1914)

The history of the castle dates back to the 10th century. In 959, a "Castellum Humbacense" was first mentioned in a document as the residence of Herman I, Duke of Swabia. In 1018, Emperor Henry II transferred the castle and its associated manorial estate to the Archbishop of Trier, Poppo von Babenberg, and thus to the Archbishopric of Trier. Archbishop Theoderich von Wied had it fortified to secure the areas of his Diocese on the right bank of the Rhine, but was unable to prevent the castle from being attacked and destroyed by the Henry II, Count of Nassau in 1212. Inspired by Mount Tabor in Israel, Theoderich had the complex rebuilt in 1217 and named the castle hill "Mons Tabor", from which the later "Montabaur" developed. The complex was first mentioned under this name in 1227.

The castle was subsequently administered by a castle captain. It also served as the official residence of episcopal officials and was guarded by castle guards. Around 1400, there were 53 of them. The keep was built around 1280, but around 1520 the medieval fortification was rebuilt into a four-winged Renaissance palace, the core of which has survived to the present day. Previously, King Maximilian had spent the night in the castle in 1505 with 500 people in his entourage.

The palace received its current appearance between 1687 and 1709, when Elector Johann Hugo von Orsbeck had it redesigned in the Baroque style by his court architect Johann Christoph Sebastiani. The ceiling paintings are by Lazaro Maria Sanguinetti and depict allegories of light and personifications of the four elements: air, earth, fire and water. The complex served as the residence of the Archbishops of Trier until the end of the 18th century, before the last Elector, Clemens Wenceslaus of Saxony, fled from the French revolutionary armies in 1794, and the Electorate was abolished in 1801. The former Trier possessions - and with them Montabaur Palace - fell to the Duchy of Nassau-Weilburg. The Dukes of Nassau subsequently used the complex as a hunting lodge.

From 1851 until 1880, the buildings housed the Ducal Nassau Teacher Training College. From 1868 onward, they also served as the seat of the district administration office and, until 1945, as the residence of the district administrator of the Lower Westerwald district. After the Second World War, the castle was used as the administrative seat of the Montabaur administrative district from 1946 onward.

In 1969, the German Cooperative Society acquired the property, which was subsequently used by the Schulze-Delitzsch Institute and the Federal Cooperative School Raiffeisen. After the two institutes merged in 1978 to form the Academy of German Cooperatives, the Academy purchased the castle and converted it into a seminar and conference center.

=== Current use ===
Since 1970, Montabaur Castle has served as a nationwide center for management training for prospective and current managers of cooperative banks and cooperative enterprises.

The ADG Group on the Montabaur Castle campus includes the Academy of German Cooperatives, the ADG Business School at Steinbeis University, the ADG Scientific – Center for Research and Cooperation, and the Hotel Schloss Montabaur.

== See also ==
- List of castles in Rhineland-Palatinate
