= Klöckner Pentaplast =

Luxembourg plastics manufacturer

Klöckner Pentaplast Group
- Industry: Plastic processing / plastic packaging
- Founded: 1965
- Area served: London, UK, Montabaur, Germany and Gordonsville, Virginia, USA
- Key people: Roberto Villaquiran CEO; Marc Rotella (CFO); Alan Richards (COO and Head of Corporate Sustainability); Tony Harrison (CPO); Garry Randall (Chief Human Resources Officer); Svetlana Walker (General Counsel & Chief Compliance Officer); Thomas Kure Jakobsen (President Food Packaging); Sofiane Laoussadi (President Pharma, Health & Protection and Durables); Paul McCombs (Chief Information Officer)
- Revenue: ~ 2 Billion
- Number of employees: 5600
- Website: www.kpfilms.com

Klöckner Pentaplast, also known as “kp”, is a manufacturer of plastic packaging products. Headquartered in Luxembourg, with other corporate offices in London UK, Montabaur Germany, and Gordonsville, Virginia, USA, kp has a total of 31 facilities in 18 countries, with ca. 5,700 employees worldwide.

With around €2 billion in revenues annually, the Group operates 2 divisions: (1) Pharma, Health & Protection and Durables (PHD); (2) Food Packaging (FP); servicing a wide variety of customers in the food-, pharmaceutical-, medical device- and consumer packaging sectors, as well as films for labels, cards, printing and construction industries.

The company is held by a group of investors led by the financial investor Strategic Value Partners (SVP).

== History ==
Klöckner Pentaplast was originally founded in 1965 as a subsidiary of Klöckner-Werke AG in Montabaur, Germany, in the course of the establishment of the plastics industry in the 1960s. Its first production facility outside Germany was opened in 1979 in Gordonsville, Virginia, United States.

In 1996, Klöckner Pentaplast and Kalle Hartfolien GmbH, a subsidiary of Hoechst AG, formed a joint venture under the name of Kalle Pentaplast GmbH, making rigid plastic films. When Klöckner-Werke AG acquired Höchst AG's share in Kalle Pentaplast in 1998, the company was renamed back to Klöckner Pentaplast.

The company was sold in 2001 to a partnership between Cinven and JP Morgan. In 2007 it was purchased by the Blackstone Group. In June 2012, a group of investors under the leadership of Strategic Value Partners (SVP) acquired Klöckner Pentaplast from Blackstone.

In 2025, the company filed for a prepackaged Chapter 11 bankruptcy protection as part of a restructuring plan to eliminate the majority of its $1.5 billion debt. After eliminating the vast majority of its debt, the company emerged from bankruptcy in February 2026.
