= Ingelheim am Rhein =

- Town
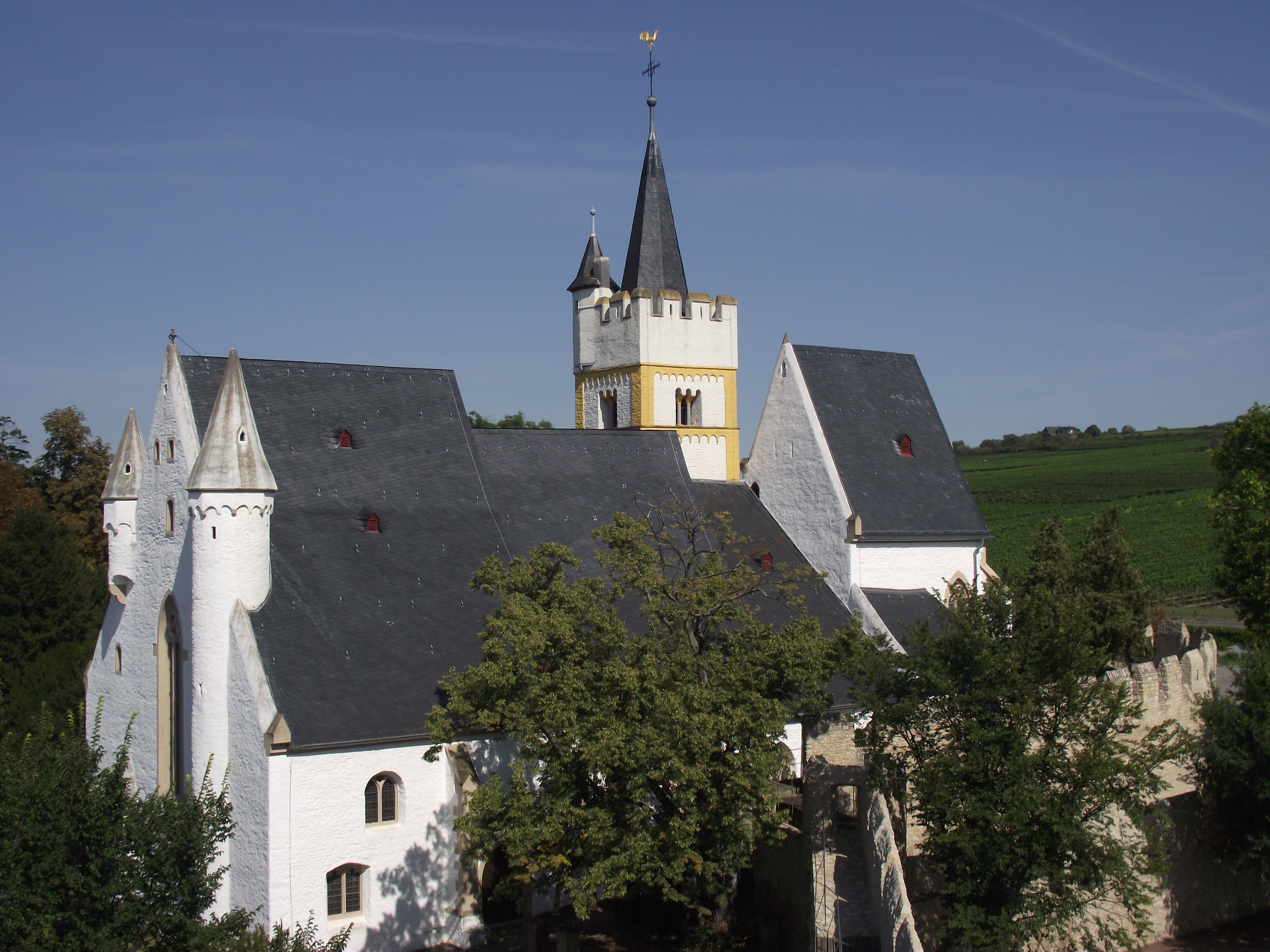
- The Burgkirche ("Castle Church") in Ingelheim

- Flag Coat of arms

- Location of Ingelheim am Rhein within Mainz-Bingen district
- Interactive map of Ingelheim am Rhein
- Location within Germany Location within Rhineland-Palatinate
- Coordinates: 49°58′29″N 8°3′23″E
- Country: Germany
- State: Rhineland-Palatinate
- District: Mainz-Bingen

Government
  - Mayor (2026–34): Eveline Breyer (CDU)

Area
  - Total: 73.31 km^{2} (28.31 sq mi)
- Elevation: 80–247 m (262–810 ft)

Population (2025-12-31)
  - Total: 34,903
  - Density: 476.1/km^{2} (1,233/sq mi)
- Time zone: UTC+01:00 (CET)
  - Summer (DST): UTC+02:00 (CEST)
- Postal codes: 55218
- Dialling codes: 06132; 06130-Großwinternheim; 06725-Sporkenheim
- Vehicle registration: MZ, BIN
- Website: www.ingelheim.de

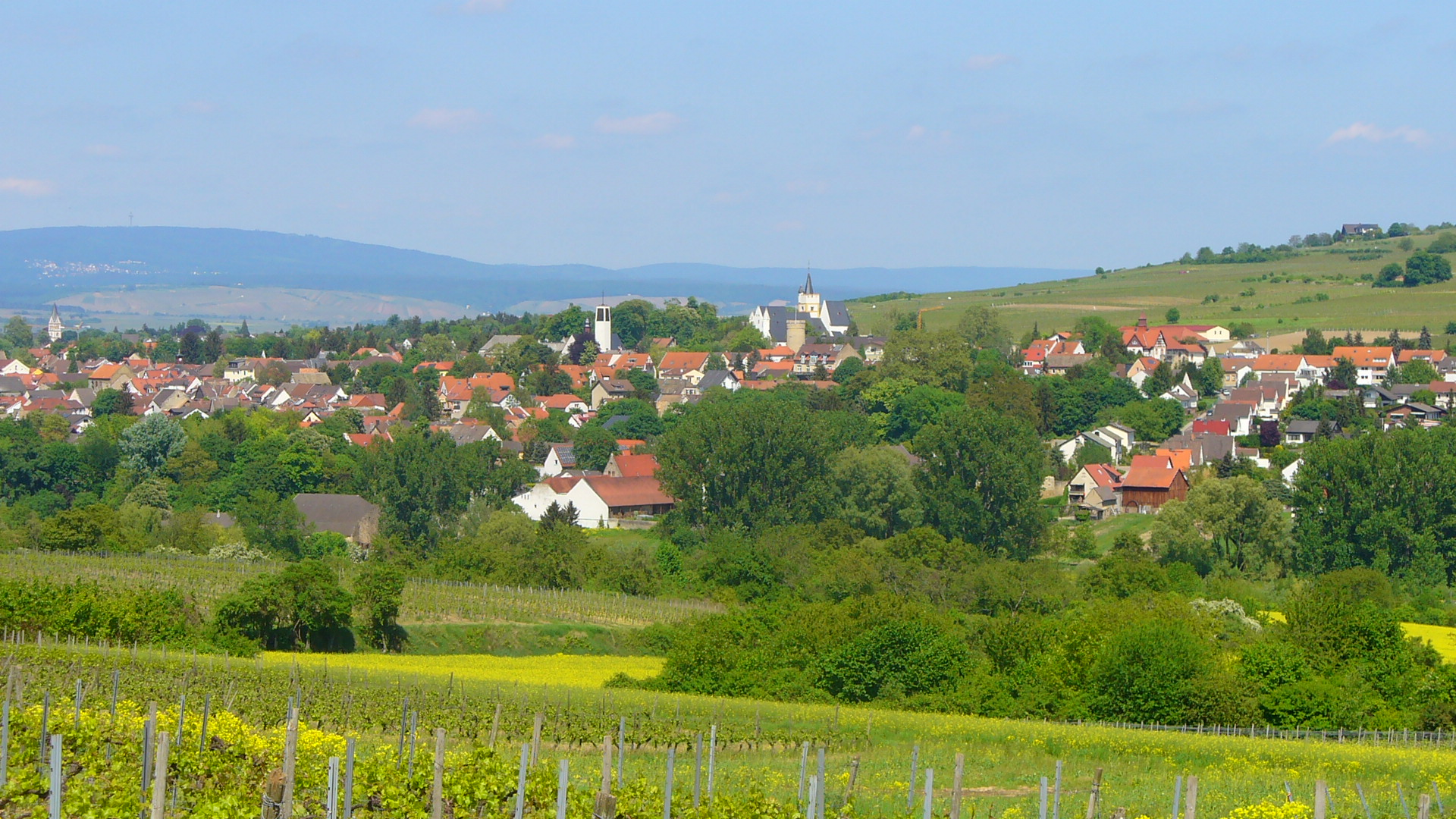
Ingelheim, 2009

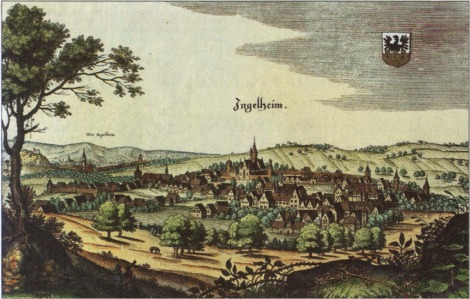
Coloured engraving of Ingelheim, Matthäus Merian, 1645

Ingelheim (German pronunciation: [ˈɪŋəlhaɪm]), officially Ingelheim am Rhein (German pronunciation: [ˈɪŋəlhaɪm ʔam ˈʁaɪn], lit. 'Ingelheim on the Rhine'), is a town in the Mainz-Bingen district in the Rhineland-Palatinate state of Germany and also the seat of the Mainz-Bingen district. The town sprawls along the Rhine's left bank. It has been Mainz-Bingen's district seat since 1996.

From the later half of the 8th century, the Ingelheim Imperial Palace, which served emperors and kings as a lodging and a ruling seat until the 11th century, was to be found here.

== Etymology ==
The typically Rhenish-Hessian placename ending —heim might well go back to Frankish times, that is to say, likely as far back as the 5th or 6th century. Settlements or estates then took their lords’ names and were given this suffix, which means "home" in German. The name is recorded in later documents as Ingilinhaim, Ingilinheim (782), Ingilenhaim, Engelheim, Hengilonheim, Engilonheim (822), Engilinheim (826), Hingilinheim (855), Ingilunheim (874), Ingulinheim (889), Ingelesheim (891), Ingelenheim (940), Anglia sedes (1051), Ingilheim and Ingelnheim (1286), among other forms.

Since 1269, a distinction has been made between Nieder-Ingelheim and Ober-Ingelheim (Lower and Upper Ingelheim).

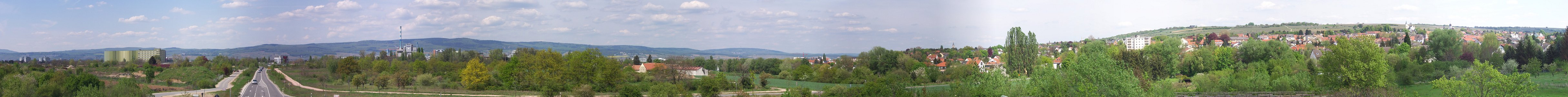
Panorama of Ingelheim

== Geography ==
=== Location ===
Ingelheim am Rhein lies in the north of Rhein Hessen on the so-called Rhein Knee, west of the state capital, Mainz. The Rhein forms the town's northern limit. Southwards, the town stretches into the valley of the river Selz, which empties into the Rhein in the constituent community of Frei-Weinheim or Ingelheim-Nord ("North").

The constituent communities of Ingelheim-Mitte and Ingelheim-Süd ("Middle" and "South") are nestled against the corner of the so-called Mainzer Berg ("Mainz Mountain").

The municipal area's lowest point is the harbour on the Rhein at 80.8 m above sea level. The two highest points are the Mainzer Berg at 247.8 m above sea level and the Westerberg at 247.5 m above sea level.

An obelisk on the south side of the village in direction Wackernheim, marks the road begun by Charlemagne, and completed by Napoleon. From this point a fine prospect of the entire Rheingau could be obtained.

=== Municipal area’s extent ===
The municipal area's north-south extent is 7.9 km, while the east-west extent is 5 km.

=== Neighbouring municipalities ===
Clockwise from the north, these are Geisenheim, Oestrich-Winkel on the Rhine's right bank, and on the left bank Budenheim, Finthen (a suburb of Mainz), the Verbandsgemeinde of Nieder-Olm, Schwabenheim, Gau-Algesheim (both belonging to the Verbandsgemeinde of Gau-Algesheim) and Bingen am Rhein. Since 1 July 2019 Wackernheim and Heidesheim are incorporated into the city of Ingelheim.

=== Constituent communities ===
Ingelheim is currently divided into six Stadtteile: Ingelheim-Mitte, Ingelheim-Nord, Ingelheim-Süd, Sporkenheim, Groß-Winternheim and Ingelheim-West. Before Ingelheim became a town in 1939, the first three centres bore the names Nieder-Ingelheim, Frei-Weinheim and Ober-Ingelheim. Official changes notwithstanding, the old names are still quite often used.

=== Climate ===
The town lies in the temperate zone. The average yearly temperature in Ingelheim is 9.8 °C. The warmest months are July and August with average temperatures of 18.0 and 18.5 °C respectively, and the coldest month is January at 1.0 °C on average. The most precipitation falls in June and August with an average of 64 mm, and the least in March with an average of 31 mm. Like all Rhenish Hesse, Ingelheim, too, is sheltered from the weather by the Hunsrück, the Taunus, the Odenwald and the Donnersberg, thereby limiting the yearly precipitation to only 560 mm.

Month	Jan	Feb	Mar	Apr	May	Jun	Jul	Aug	Sep	Oct	Nov	Dec	Year
Temperature (°C)	1.0	2.0	4.5	9.5	14	17	18	18	14.5	10.5	5	2	9.7
Precipitation (mm)	40	35	31	36	52	64	59	64	45	40	51	43	560
Source: Deutscher Wetterdienst

== History ==
The Ingelheim area was already settled in prehistoric times. The place first earned itself particular importance, though, only under Charlemagne and his successors. Charlemagne had built the Ingelheim Imperial Palace (Ingelheimer Kaiserpfalz) here, where synods and Imperial diets were held in the time that followed. His son and successor, Emperor Louis the Pious, died on 20 June 840 in Ingelheim.

In the High and Late Middle Ages, the Palatinate's, and thereby also Ingelheim's, importance shrank.

For German justice history, the Ingelheimer Oberhof ("Ingelheim Upper Court") is of particular importance, as a unique collection of judgments from the 15th and 16th centuries that it handed down has been preserved.

Late 19th century Ingelheim was the residence of the Dutch writer Multatuli (Eduard Douwes Dekker).

In 1939, the formerly self-administering municipalities of Nieder-Ingelheim, Ober-Ingelheim and Frei-Weinheim were merged into the Town of Ingelheim am Rhein.

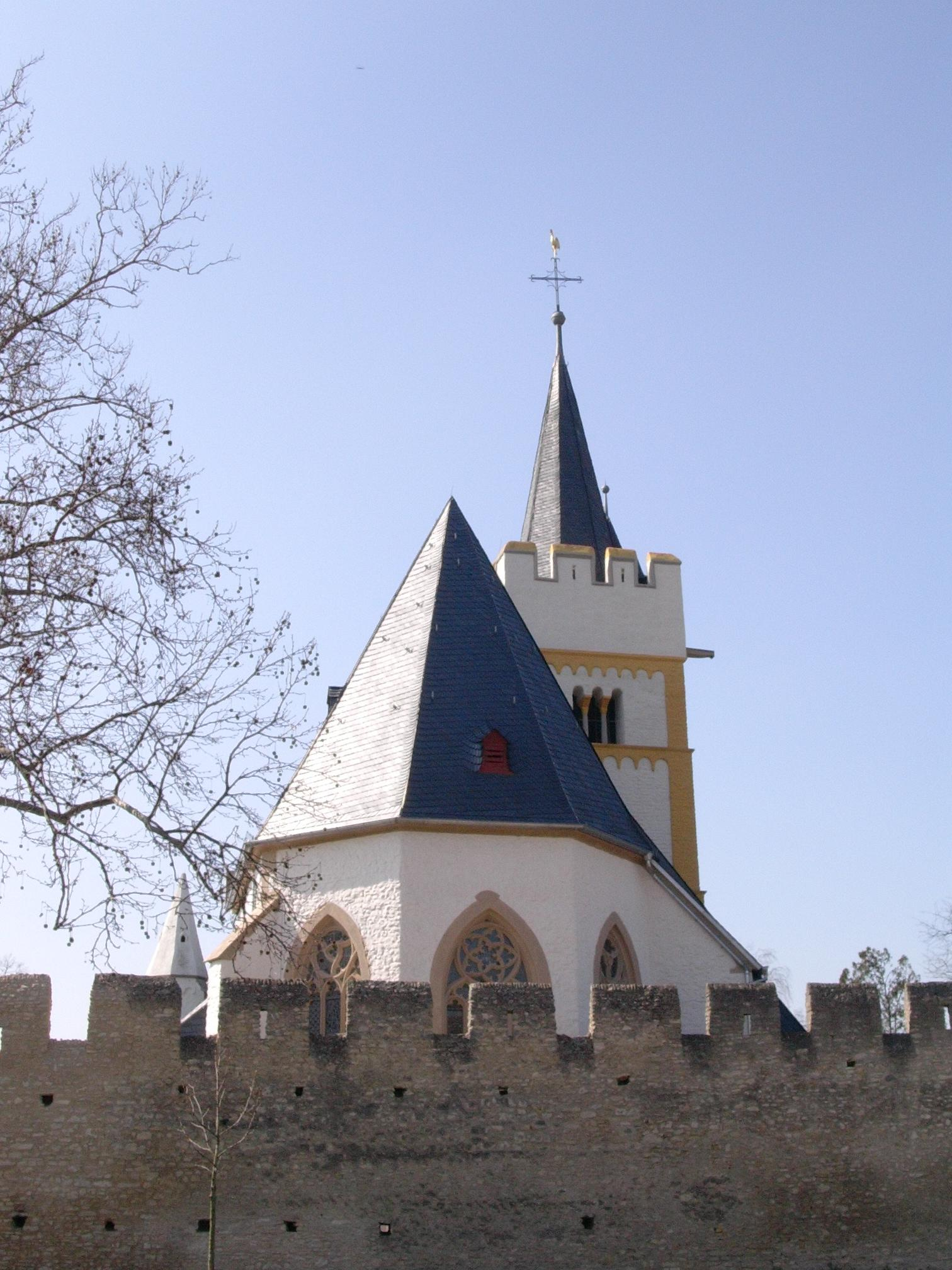
Burgkirche – "Castle Church" – the town's landmark

From the Second World War, Ingelheim emerged as the only unscathed town between Mainz and Koblenz. Today, Ingelheim is a middle centre in Rhineland-Palatinate, a Great District-Bound Town (Große kreisangehörige Stadt – a status deriving from the Rhineland-Palatinate Municipal Order) and the seat of district administration for Mainz-Bingen.

Furthermore, Ingelheim harbours the business Boehringer Ingelheim which is active worldwide.

== Population data ==
=== Religion ===
In 2004, 36% of Ingelheim's inhabitants belonged to the Lutheran faith, and 34% were Catholic, while 24% were without any religious faith; from 2% of the population, no data were forthcoming.

The six Catholic parishes belong, within the Roman Catholic Diocese of Mainz to the Deanery of Bingen.

The five Protestant parishes of the EKHN belong to the Provostship (Propstei) of Mainz, and within this to the Deanery of Ingelheim.

Besides these, the Baptists, Religious humanists and Muslims each have small communities in Ingelheim, as do the Jehovah's Witnesses and Buddhists.

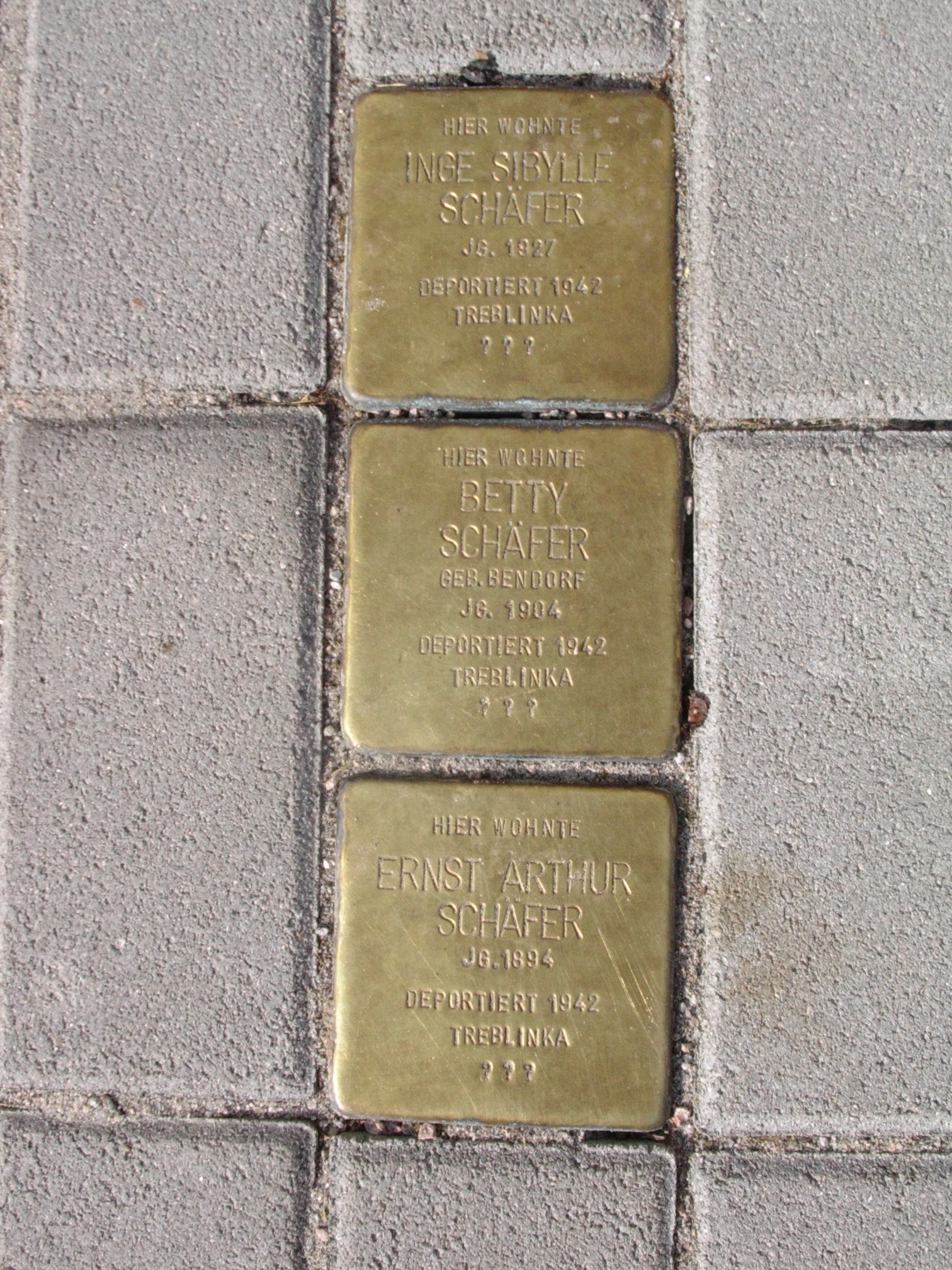
Stolpersteine

Until 1942 there was a Jewish community, whose beginnings went back to the 16th century. About 1850, roughly 200 Jewish inhabitants lived in Ober-Ingelheim, and by 1933 there were still 134 all together in Oberingelheim and Niederingelheim. In 1840 and 1841, a synagogue that was important to architectural history was built. It was dedicated on 27 August 1841 and destroyed on 9 November 1938 – Kristallnacht. Many Jewish inhabitants lost their lives after being deported to the death camps during the time of the Third Reich.

=== Amalgamations ===
On 22 April 1972 the municipality of Groß-Winternheim was amalgamated. The former municipalities Heidesheim am Rhein and Wackernheim were merged into Ingelheim am Rhein on 1 July 2019.

=== Population development ===
==== Before 1939 ====
Year	Nieder-Ingelheim	Ober-Ingelheim	Frei-Weinheim	total
1815	1,360	1,738	192	3,290
1871				5,760
1885	2,729	3,160	701	6,590
1900	3,435	3,402	838	7,675
1905				8,098
1910	3,852	3,479	882	8,213
1933	5,157	4,116	1,183	10,456
1939	5,526	4,309	1,200	11,035

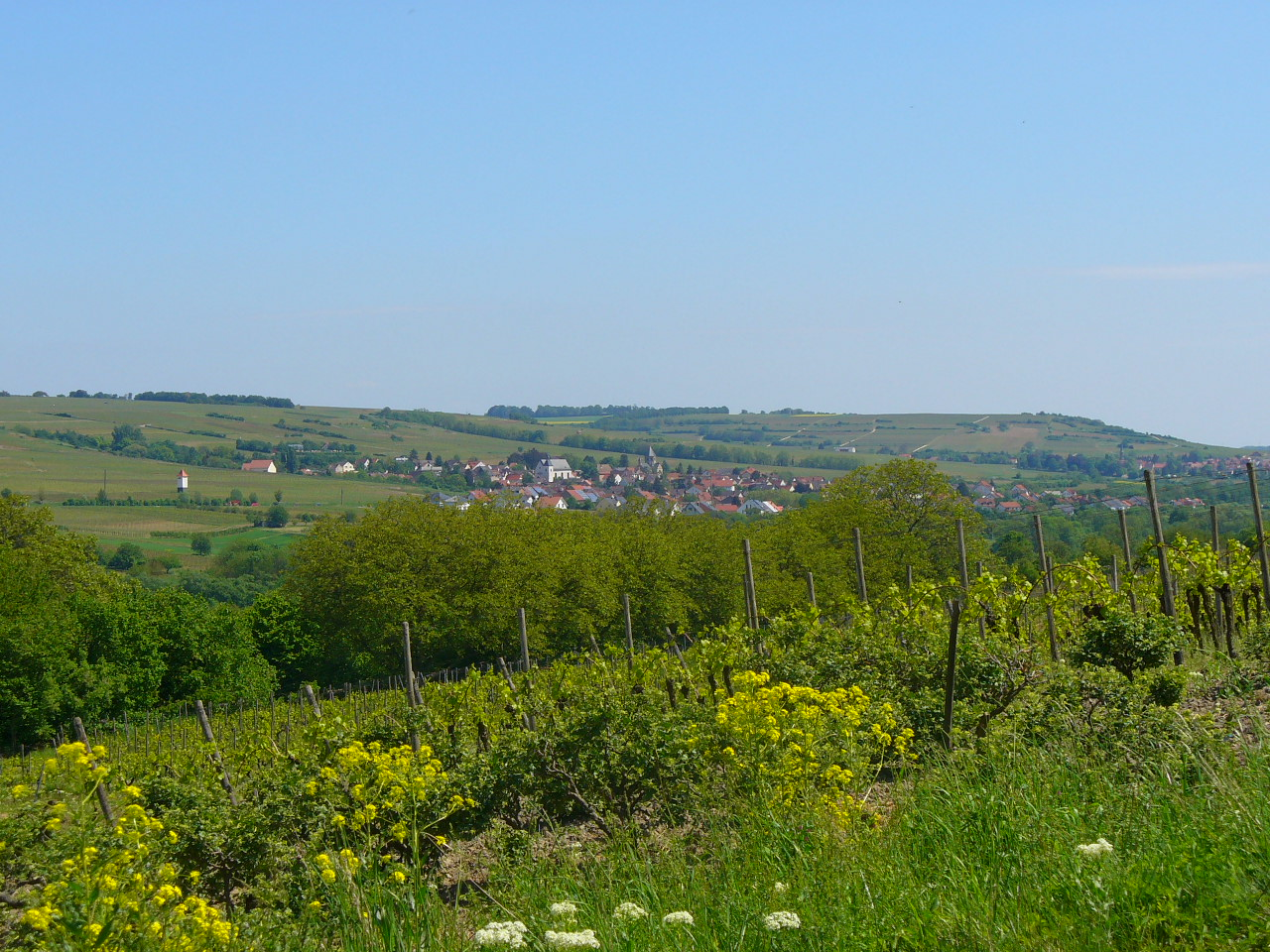
Groß-Winternheim in March 2009

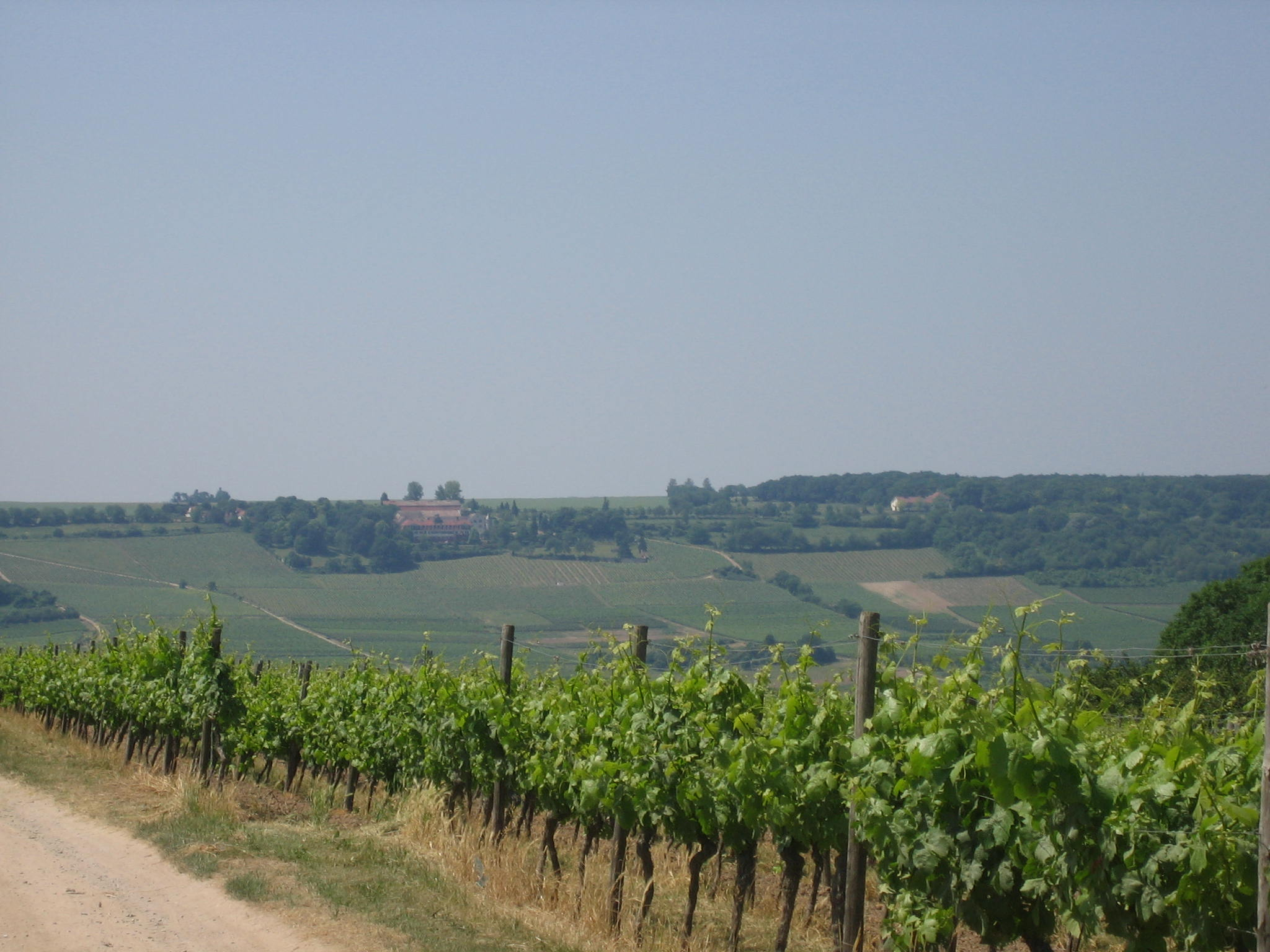
Schloss Westerhaus on the Westerberg, since 1900 owned by the Family Opel

==== Beginning in 1939 ====
Year	Population
1939	11,035
1945	11,348
1946	11,875¹
1949	12,500
1955	15,078
1/1/1957	15,428
1961	15,792
early 1966	~19,000
1970	18,719
1971	21,501
1972	22,534
1974	23,323

Year	Population
1975	19,224
1980	20,855
1985	21,712
1990	22,111
1995	24,747
1997	25,683
2000	25,840
2001	25,764
2002	25,954
2003	26,153
2004	26,289
2019	35,193
¹: Census

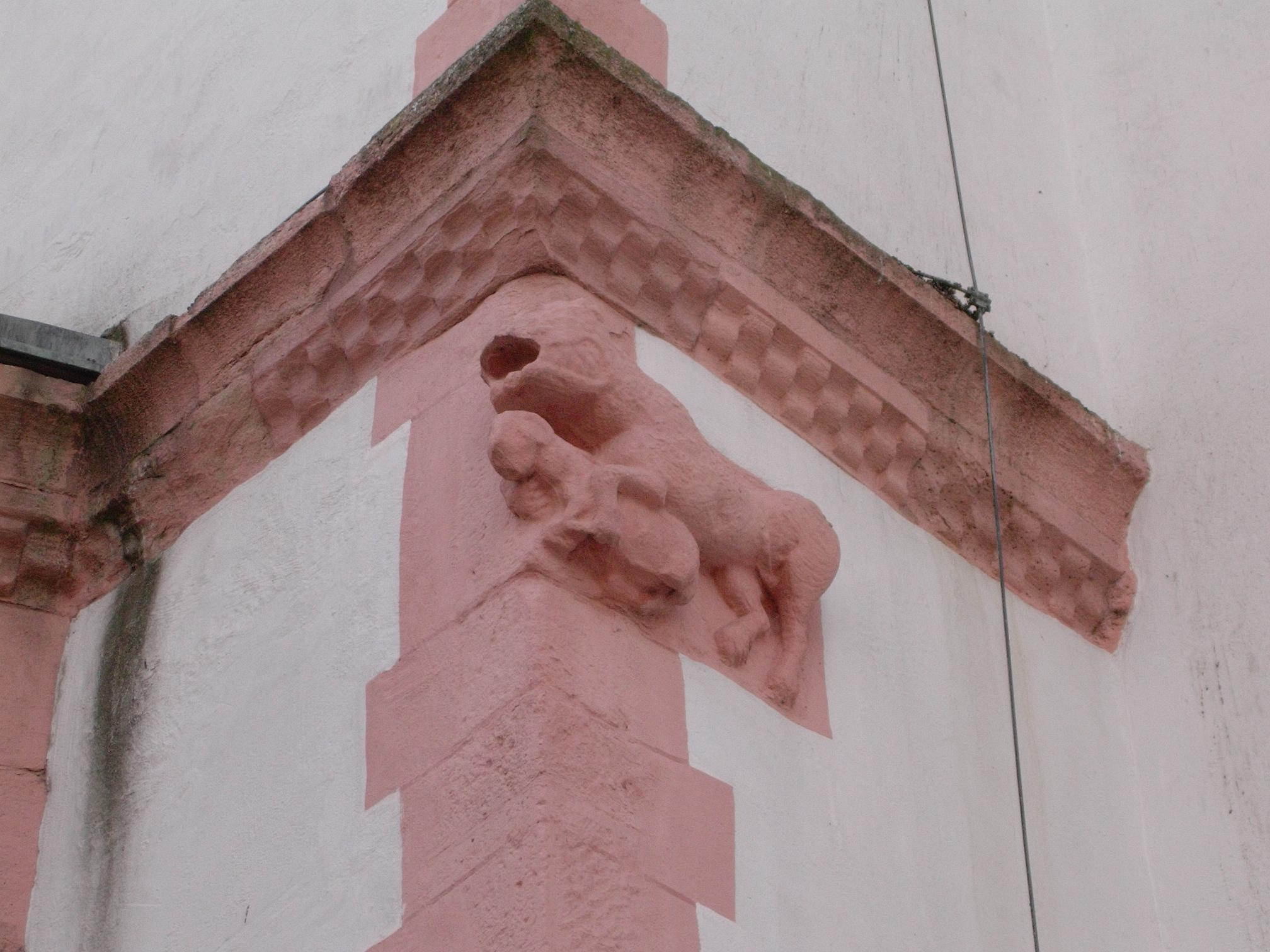
Imposts in the church's apse

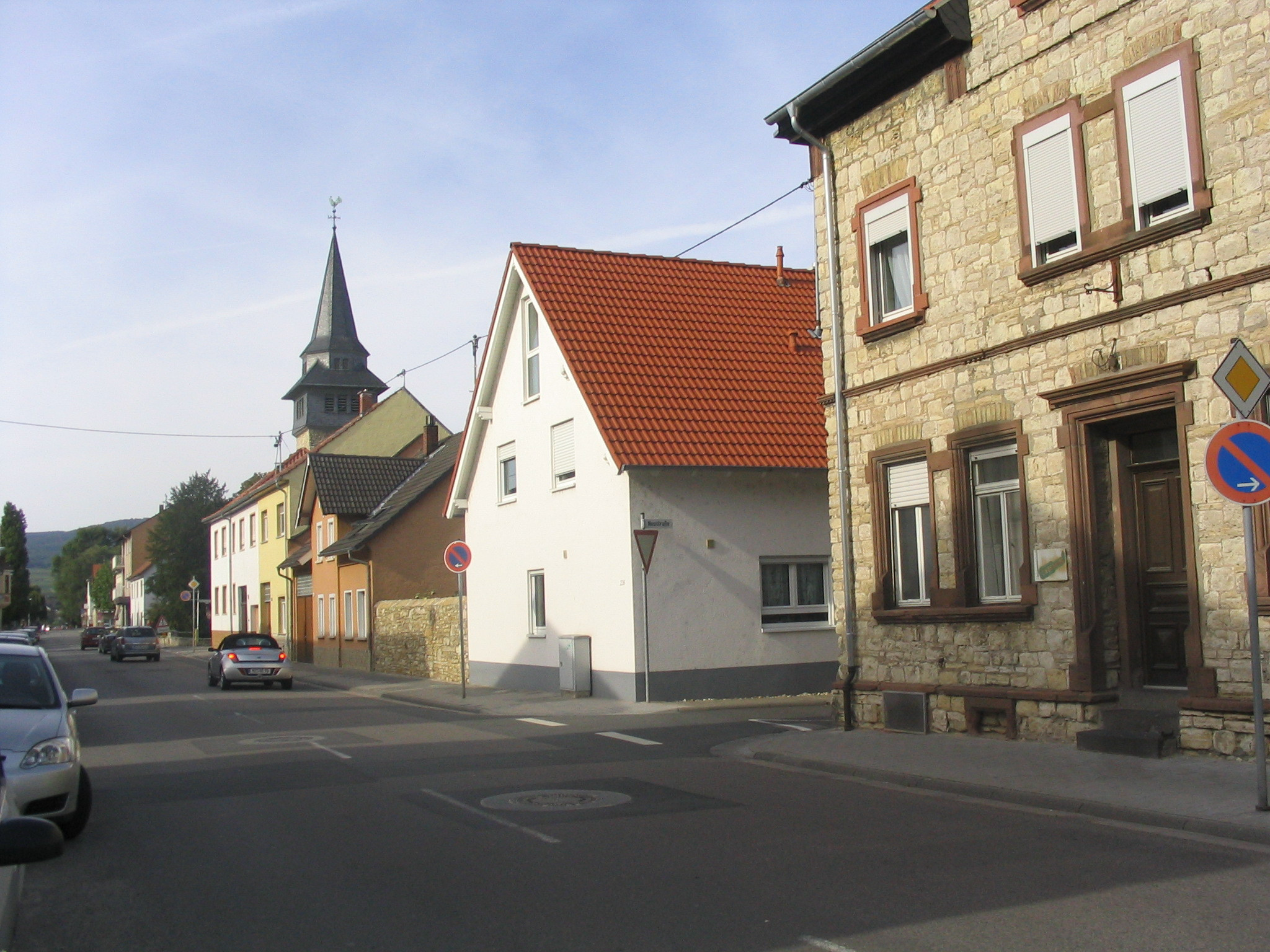
Ingelheim Nord (Frei-Weinheim)

== Politics ==
=== Town council ===
The municipal election held in 2004 yielded the following results:

Party	%	Seats
Christian Democratic Union of Germany	37.53% (-4.24%)	13
Social Democratic Party of Germany	29.64% (-5.90%)	11
Grünen	10.41% (+2.52%)	4
Liste Klose	10.19% (+10.19%)	4
Freie Wähler	7.30% (-2.33%)	2
Free Democratic Party	4.93% (-0.24%)	2

=== Mayor ===
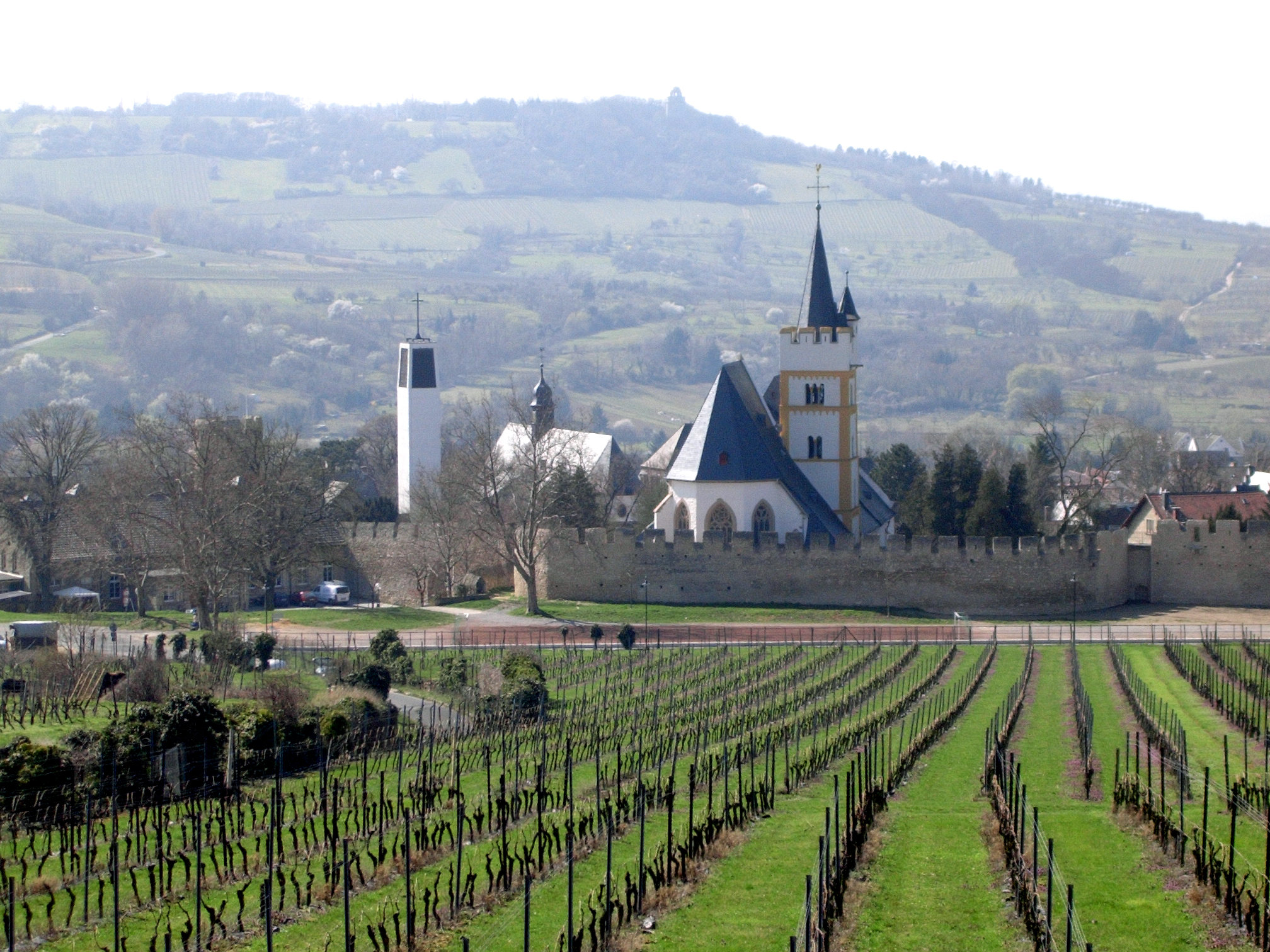
Ingelheim-Süd (Ober-Ingelheim) with Burgkirche, St. Michael and Bismarckturm on the Westerberg

In the last mayoral elections, held on 22 March 2026, Eveline Breyer was elected as mayor:

Candidate	Party	%
Breyer, Eveline	CDU	55.8%
Schäfer, Sybille	SPD	26.5%
Heiser, Stephen	Grüne	17.7%

This election became necessary after the previous mayor Claus Schick, in office since 2012, announced his retirement on 30 April 2026.

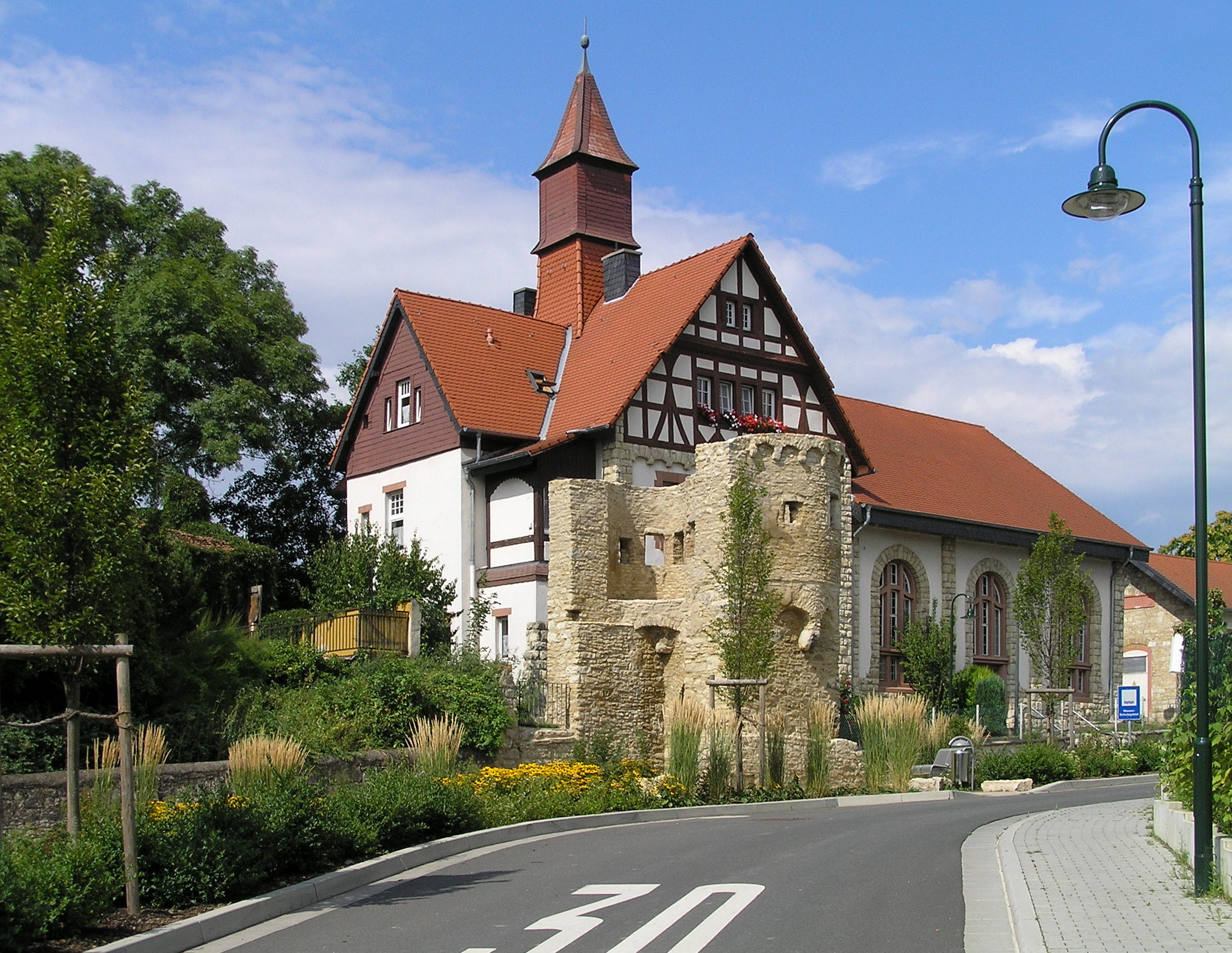
Old power station with Uffhubtor and newly made greenspace

=== Results of council elections since 1946 ===
- 1946
  - CDU: 42.2%
  - SPD: 26%
  - KPD: 9.2%
  - Liste Gemünden/Gaul: 22.6%

Eligible voters: 6,899
Voter turnout: 88.6%

- 1948
  - CDU: 35.1%
  - SPD: 33.1%
  - DP: 25.3%
  - KP: 6.5%
- 9 November 1952
  - Freie Bürgerliste Rausch: 40.1%, 2,882 votes — 11 seats
  - SPD: 23.04%, 1,656 votes — 6 seats
  - CDU: 22.43%, 1,612 votes — 6 seats
  - FDP: 10.21%, 734 votes — 2 seats
  - KPD: 4.2%, 303 votes

Eligible voters: 9,488
Voter turnout: 77.76%, 7378 votes, 7,187 valid votes

- 1956
  - SPD: 36.79%, 2,611 votes — 9 seats
  - CDU: 27.06%, 1,920 votes — 7 seats
  - Wählergruppe Bambach: 24.45%, 1,735 votes — 6 seats
  - FDP: 11.7%, 830 votes — 3 seats

Eligible voters: 9,979
Voter turnout: 72.62%, 7,247 votes, 7,096 valid votes

- 23 October 1960
  - SPD: 42.61%, 3,114 votes — 11 seats
  - CDU: 36.65%, 2,679 votes — 10 seats
  - FDP: 16.92%, 1,237 votes — 2 seats
  - Wählergruppe Kaufmann: 3.82%, 279 votes

Eligible voters: 10,695
Voter turnout: 70.14%, 7,502 votes, 7,309 valid votes

- 25 October 1964
  - SPD: 51.7% — 13 seats (absolute majority)
  - CDU: 34.7%, 2,800 votes — 9 seats
  - FDP: 13.6%, 1,098 votes — 3 seats

Eligible voters: 11,369 (50a CDU) 11,312 (40a Ing)
Voter turnout: 72.77%, 8,231 votes (50a CDU) 8,232 (40a Ing)

- 8 June 1969
  - CDU: 37.15%, 3,397 votes — 12 seats
  - SPD: 34.45%, 3,150 votes — 11 seats
  - FDP: 10.45%, 956 votes — 3 seats
  - Freie Wählergruppe Kaege: 17.95%, 1,641 votes — 5 seats

Eligible voters: 12,295
Voter turnout: 75.51%, 9,309 votes, 9,144 valid votes

- 23 April 1972
  - SPD: 41.99%, 4,263 votes — 14 seats (according to 40a 4,264)
  - CDU: 38.92%, 3,952 votes — 12 seats
  - FDP: 8.79%, 892 votes — 2 seats
  - Wählergruppe Kaege: 10.28%, 1,044 votes — 3 seats

Eligible voters: 13,992
Voter turnout: 73.46%, 10,280 votes, 10,153 valid votes

- 17 March 1974
  - CDU: 46.6%, 5,092 votes — 17 seats (40a: 46.40%)
  - SPD: 34.34%, 3,769 votes — 12 seats
  - FDP: 10.26%, 1,126 votes — 3 seats
  - FWG: 8.98%, 986 votes — 3 seats

Eligible voters: 14,027
Voter turnout: 79.17%, 11,106 votes, 10,973 valid votes

- 10/11 June 1979
  - SPD: 42.12%, 4,322 votes — 14 seats
  - CDU: 41.52%, 4,261 votes — 13 seats
  - FDP: 8.21%, 842 votes — 2 seats
  - FWG: 8.15%, 837 votes — 2 seats

Eligible voters: 14,238
Voter turnout: 73.54%, 10,470 votes, 10,262 valid votes

- 17 June 1984
  - CDU: 40.7%, 4,576 votes — 15 seats
  - SPD: 44.1%, 4,966 votes — 16 seats
  - FDP: 7.8% — 2 seats
  - FWG: 10.6% — 2 seats
  - DKP: 1% — 112 votes

Eligible voters: 15,408
Voter turnout: 74.9%, 11,252 valid votes

- 18 June 1989
  - SPD: 41.0% — 15 seats
  - CDU: 31.2% — 11 seats
  - FWG: 10.6% — 4 seats
  - FDP: 7.75% — 3 seats
  - Grüne: 7.38% — 2 seats
- 12 June 1994
  - SPD: 36.6% — 13 seats
  - CDU: 31.0% — 11 seats
  - FWG: 6 seats
  - Grüne: 4 seats
  - FDP: 2 seats

Voter turnout: 70%, 11,781 votes

=== Mayors before 1939 ===
- Nieder-Ingelheim
  - Weitzel about 1881
  - Leonard Muntermann (DDP, 1912 - 7 April 1932)
- Ober-Ingelheim
  - Dr. Georg Rückert (February 1932 - April 1933)
  - Gaul (1933-)

=== (Chief) Mayors since 1939 ===
Mayors (Bürgermeister) from 1946, Chief Mayors (Oberbürgermeister) from 1972:

- 1939-1945: Franz Bambach (NSDAP)
- 15 April 1945 - 23 June 1945: Georg Schick
- 23 June 1945 - : Dr. iur. Georg Rückert (SP)
- 22 September 1946 – 1948: Dr. iur. Georg Rückert (SP)
- 1949 - 1 October 1956: Dr. rer. pol. Heinz Brühne (SPD)
- 1957-1964: Heinz Kühn
- 1964-1965: Albert Saalwächter
- 1966-1972: Hans-Ulrich Oehlschlägel, BM (SPD)
- 1972-1975: Hans-Ulrich Oehlschlägel, OB (SPD)
- 1975-1995: Anno Vey (CDU)
- 1995-2012: Dr. Joachim Gerhard (CDU)
- 2012-2026: Ralf Claus (SPD)
- 2026-: Eveline Breyer (CDU)

=== Coat of arms ===
The town's arms might be described thus: Argent an eagle displayed sable armed and langued gules.

The eagle is the Imperial Eagle. The arms have their roots in the Imperial Freedom enjoyed by the Ingelheimer Grund (Ingelheim area).

==== Old coats of arms ====
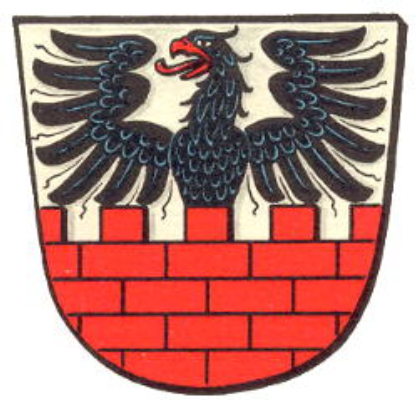
Nieder-Ingelheim (1530–1939)

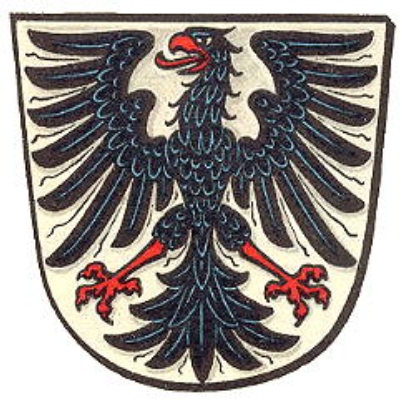
Ober-Ingelheim (until 1939)

Nieder-Ingelheim: Argent a wall embattled gules masoned sable, issuant therefrom a demi-eagle displayed of the third beaked and langued of the second.

Ober-Ingelheim: Argent an eagle displayed sable armed, beaked and langued gules.

=== Sponsorships ===
- Airbus Ingelheim am Rhein D-ABJE, Boeing 737-530, SN 25310/2126
- Until her decommissioning on 28 June 2001 there was a partnership with S58 Pinguin, a German Navy Fast Attack Craft.

== Twin towns – sister cities ==
Ingelheim am Rhein is twinned with:

- Stevenage, England, United Kingdom (1963)
- Autun, France (1963)
- San Pietro in Cariano, Italy (1984)
- Friedrichshain-Kreuzberg (Berlin), Germany (1971)
- Limbach-Oberfrohna, Germany (1990)
- Nysa, Poland (2002)

On 24 October 1975, the three-way partnership between Ingelheim, Autun and Stevenage was officially sealed.

== Culture and sightseeing ==
=== kING culture centre ===
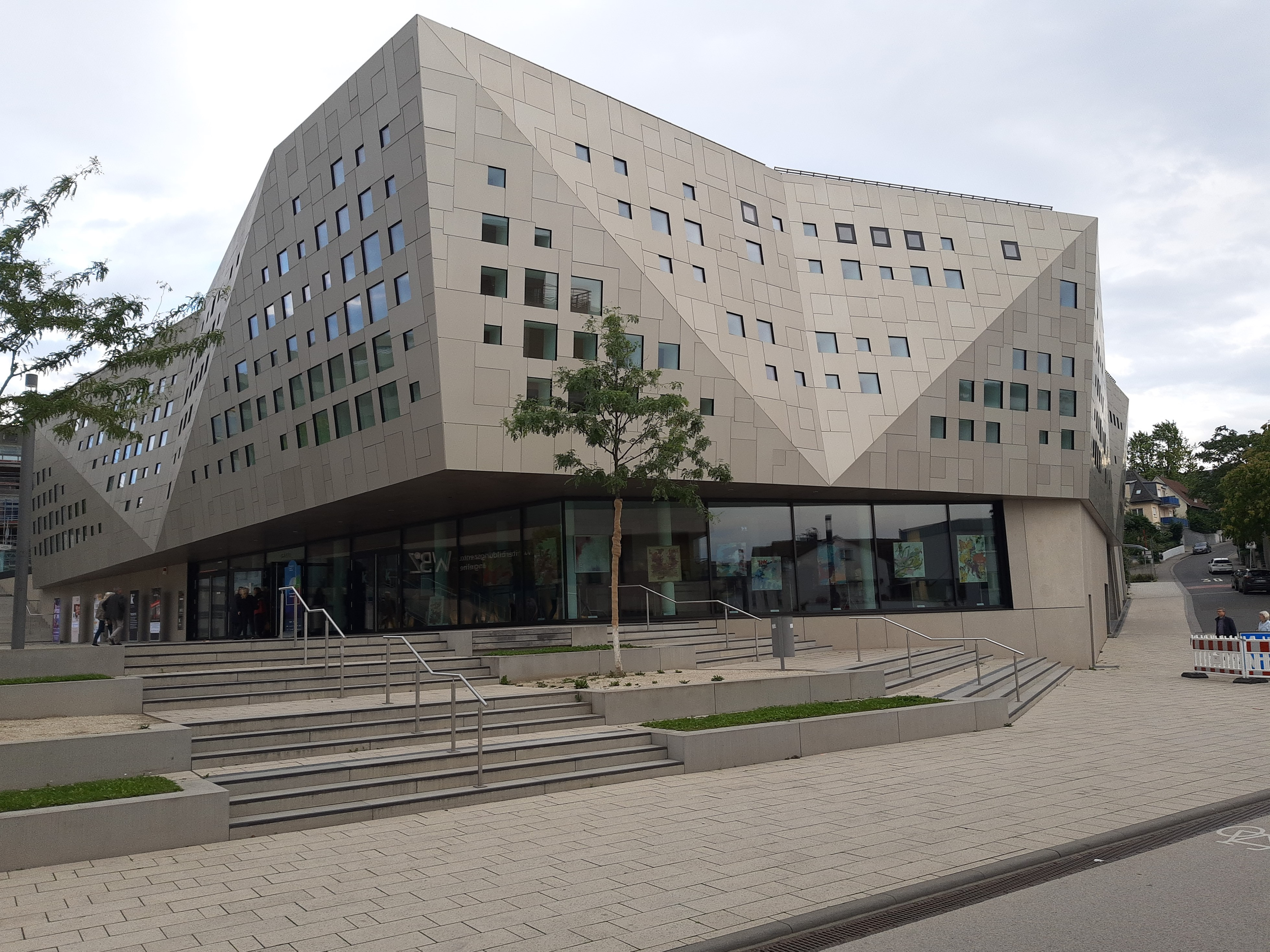
kING from the street

Ingelheim has a multi-purpose culture centre, named kING, located close to the station.

=== Museums ===
The Museum bei der Kaiserpfalz ("Museum at the Imperial Palace") has an exhibit dedicated to the Imperial Palace built in Ingelheim after 785 by Charlemagne. On show are small archaeological finds, objects from architectural sculpture and a demonstrative model of the once imposing building. Remnants of the Imperial Palace can be seen right near the museum. Of Europe-wide importance is the golden solidus found in 1996, which is hitherto still the only gold coin ever found struck with Charlemagne's effigy.

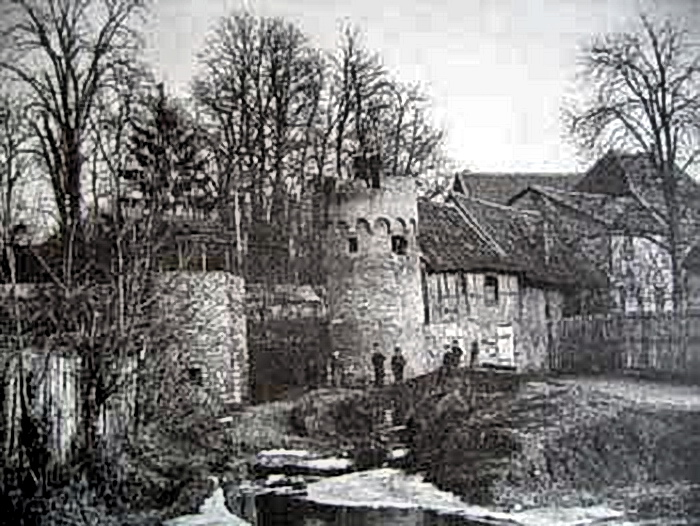
Ohrenbrücker Tor around 1900, with Engelthal abbey

=== Ohrenbrücker Tor ===
The Ohrenbrücker Tor is the southwestern gate in the city wall. The gate comprises two towers and a gothic arch. The northern tower had been reconstructed together with the arch in the middle of the 20th century. It is assumed that at the top of two of the towers, slender upright spires at the top of their buttresses existed. The gate was equipped with a machicolation above the arch. Both towers are decorated with Lombard bands.

The first reference to the gate dates back to the 13th century. It had been erected as an infrastructure provision for the Westerberg. Naturally the terrain outside the gate was a marshy ground fed by the Selz. It was difficult to come inside or outside the town by carts. Simply a small bridge for pedestrians existed.

=== Ingelheimer Fassenacht ===
There is in Ingelheim a well-developed carnival culture, which admittedly is very much under the Mainz carnival’s influence. All together, the town counts four Carnival clubs:

- Carneval-Verein "Wäschbächer" 1885
- Carnevalverein Frei-Weinheim
- Ingelheimer Carnevalverein
- Narrenclub Ingelheim 1987 ("Fools’ Club")

=== Music ===
- Further Education Centre Symphony Orchestra
- Ingelheimer Konfettis (performing and singing group)
- Ingelheim church choir
- Bläserchöre Ingelheim (wind choirs)
- Carolus Magnus-Ingelheimer Kaiserpfalzbläser (wind ensemble)
- Telemann-Chor Ingelheim (choir)

==== Singing clubs ====
- GV Liederkranz 1857
- GV Einigkeit 1885
- GV Germania 1862
- MGV 1866
- Schubert-Quartett 1924 e.V.
- Boehringer Jazz & Pop Chor 2009

=== Buildings ===
The town has at its disposal a range of historical buildings worth seeing:

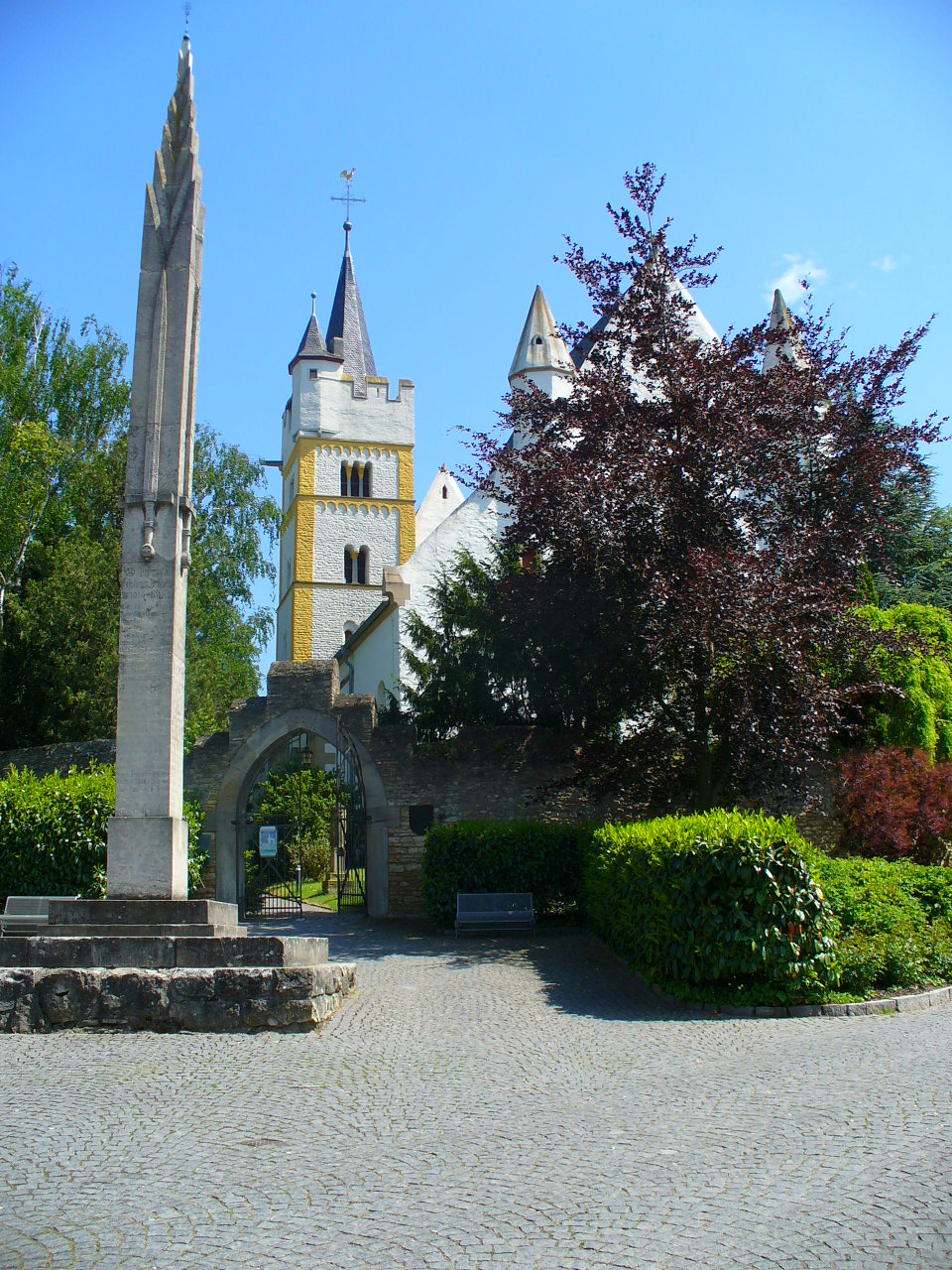
Burgkirche

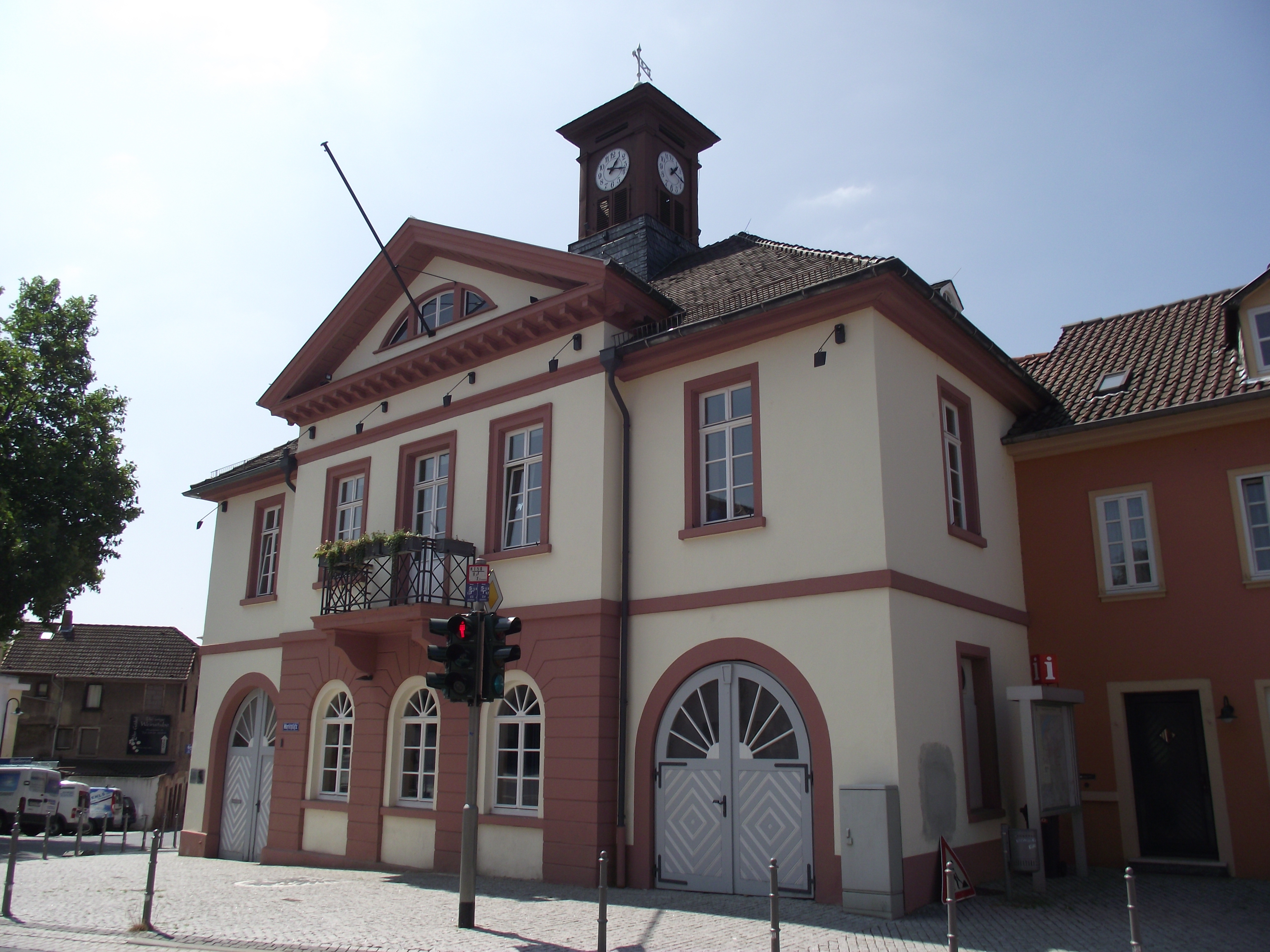
Ober-Ingelheim Old Town Hall

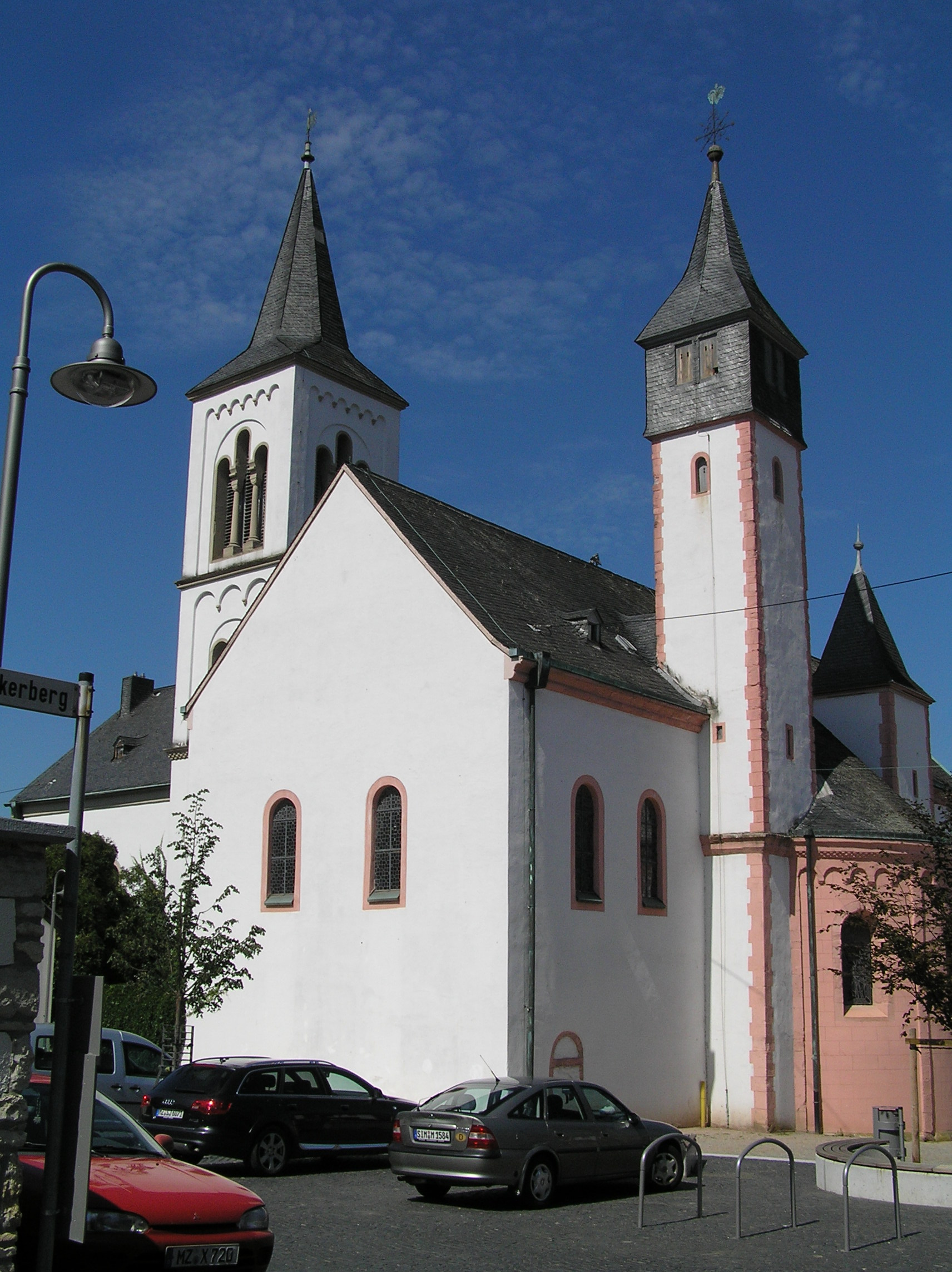
Evangelical Church, built in 997 as Saint Peter's Chapel of the Imperial Palace

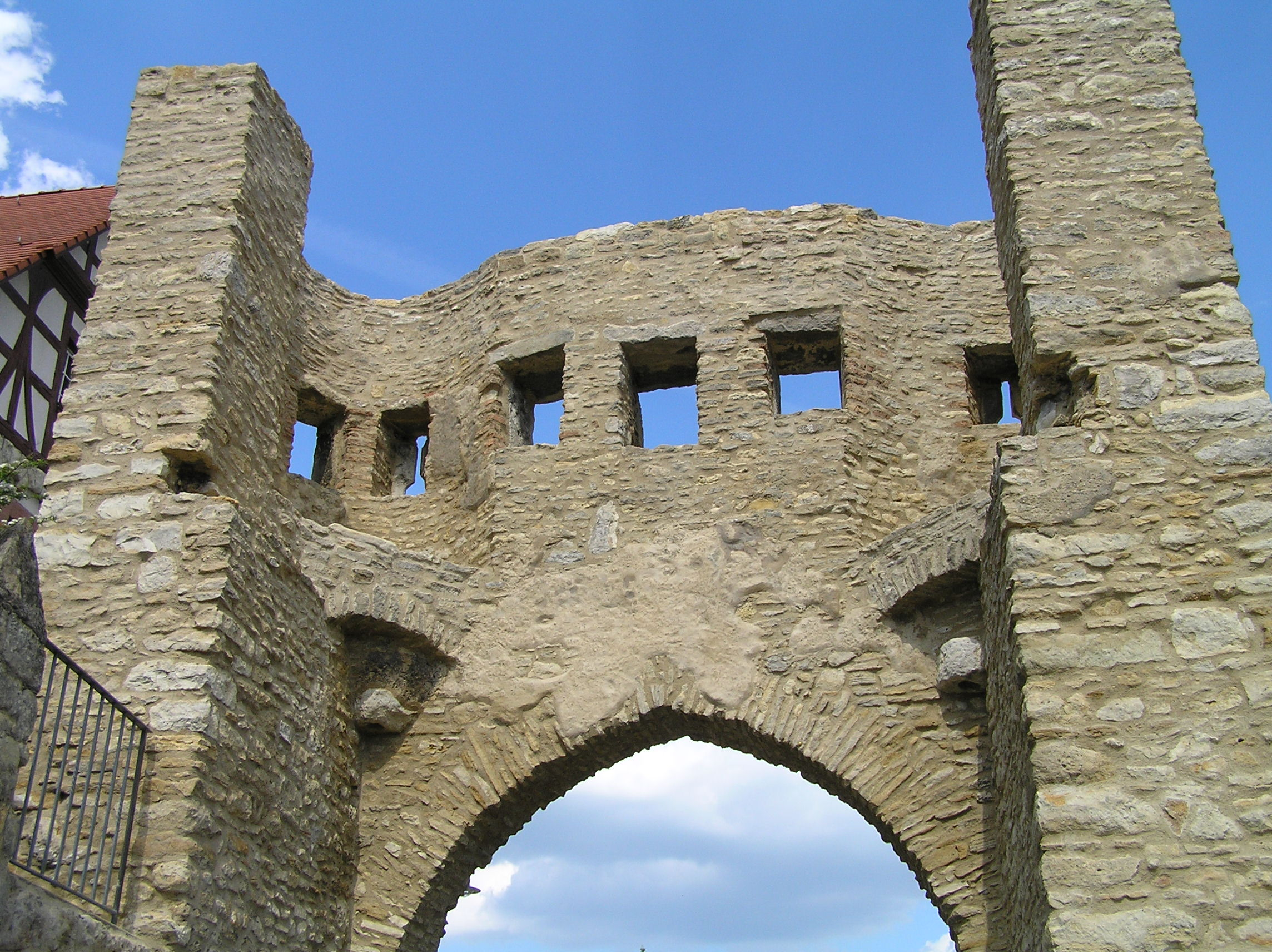
Uffhubtor

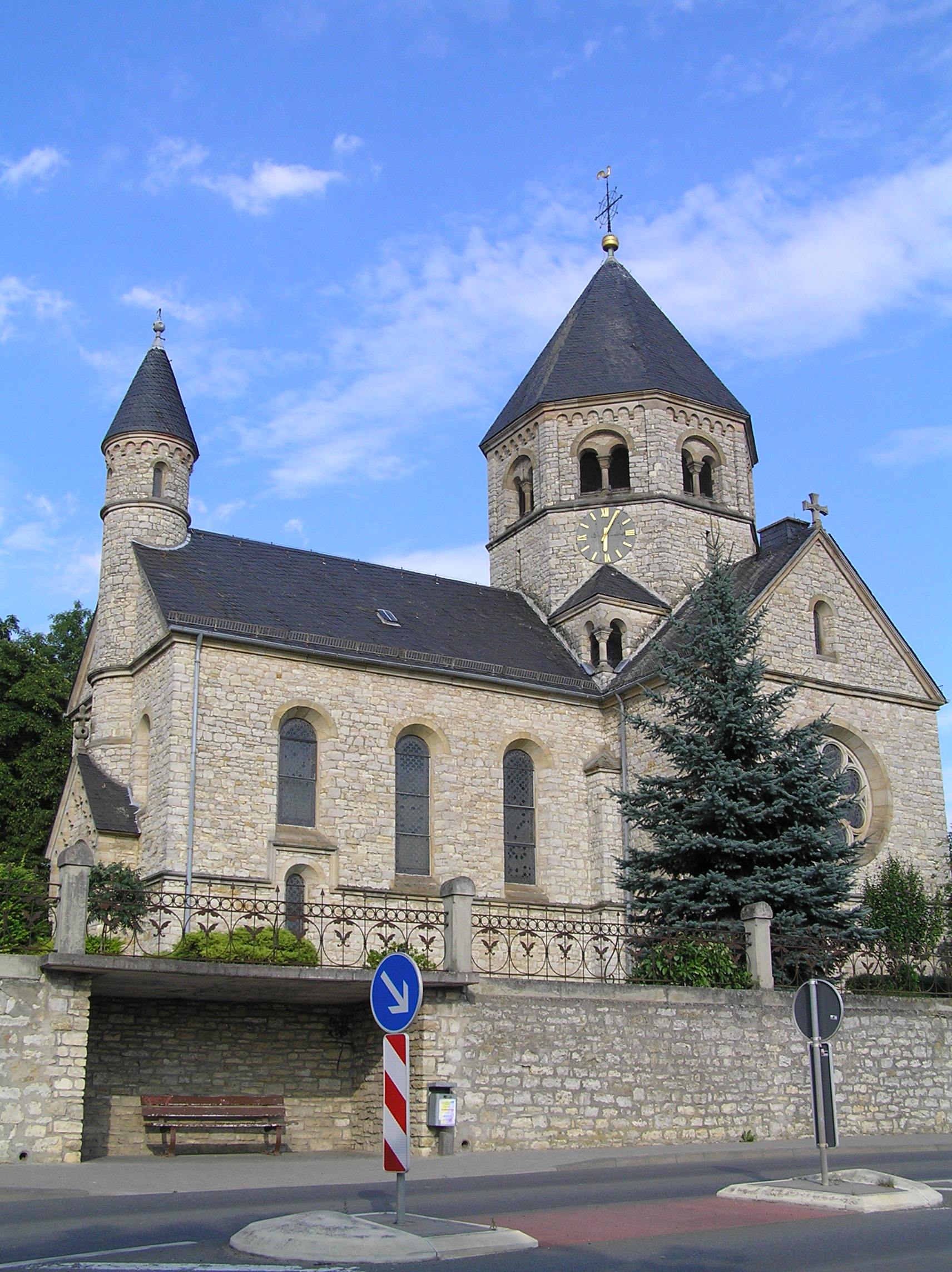
Selztaldom ("Selz Valley Cathedral")

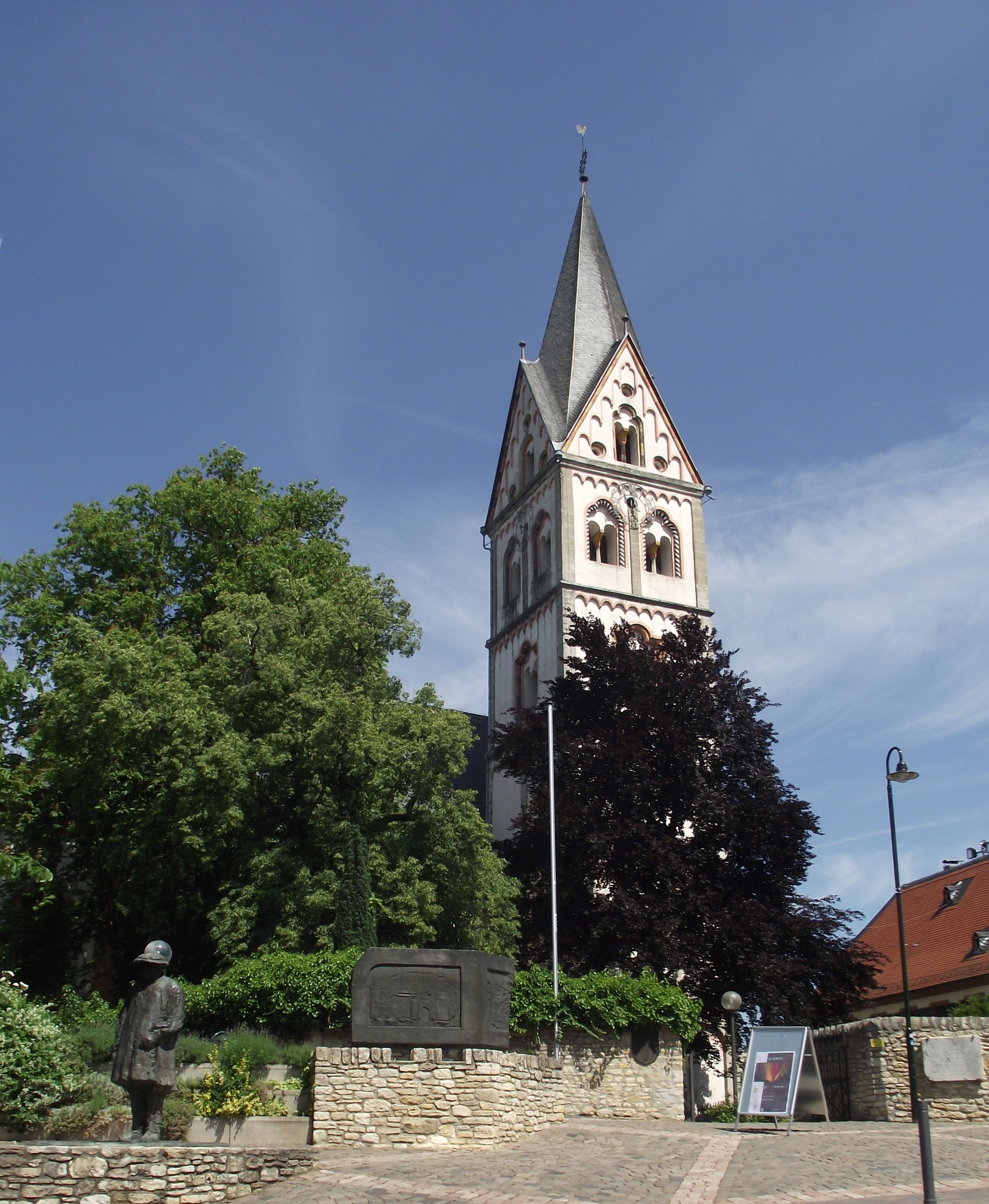
Saint Remigius's Church (Cath.) with Sebastian Münster statue

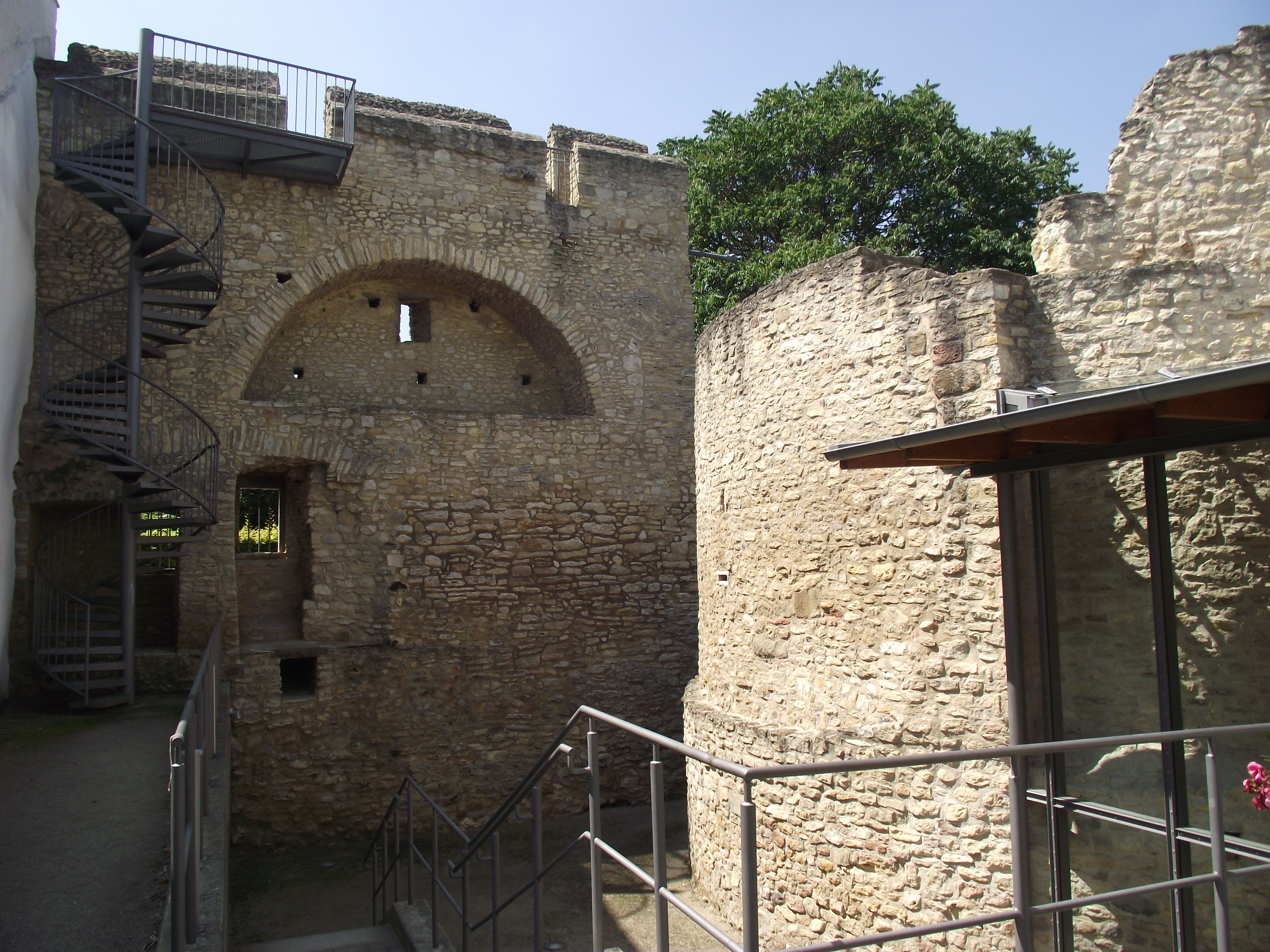
The Aula Regia at Charlemagne’s Imperial Palace

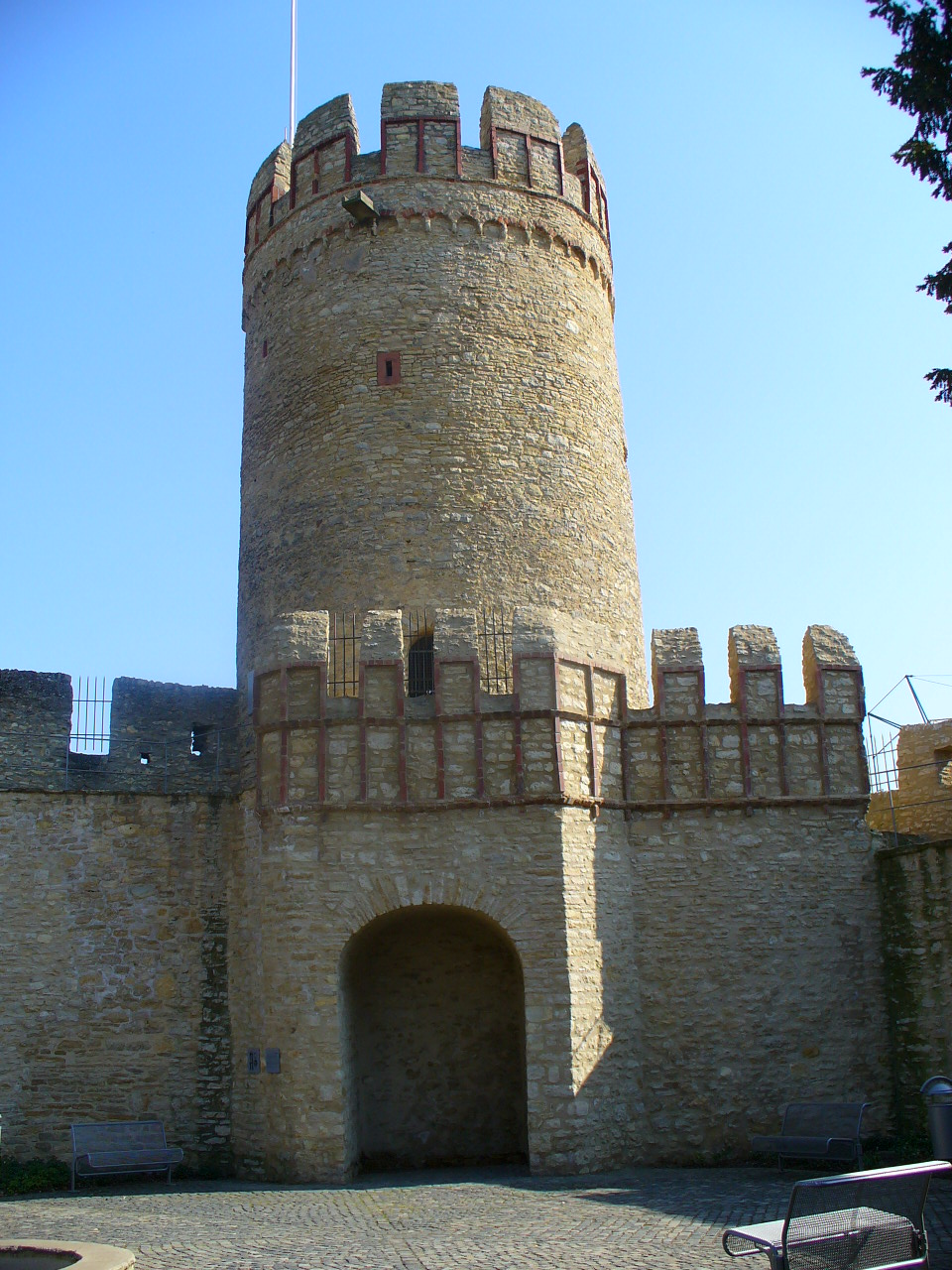
Malakoff tower

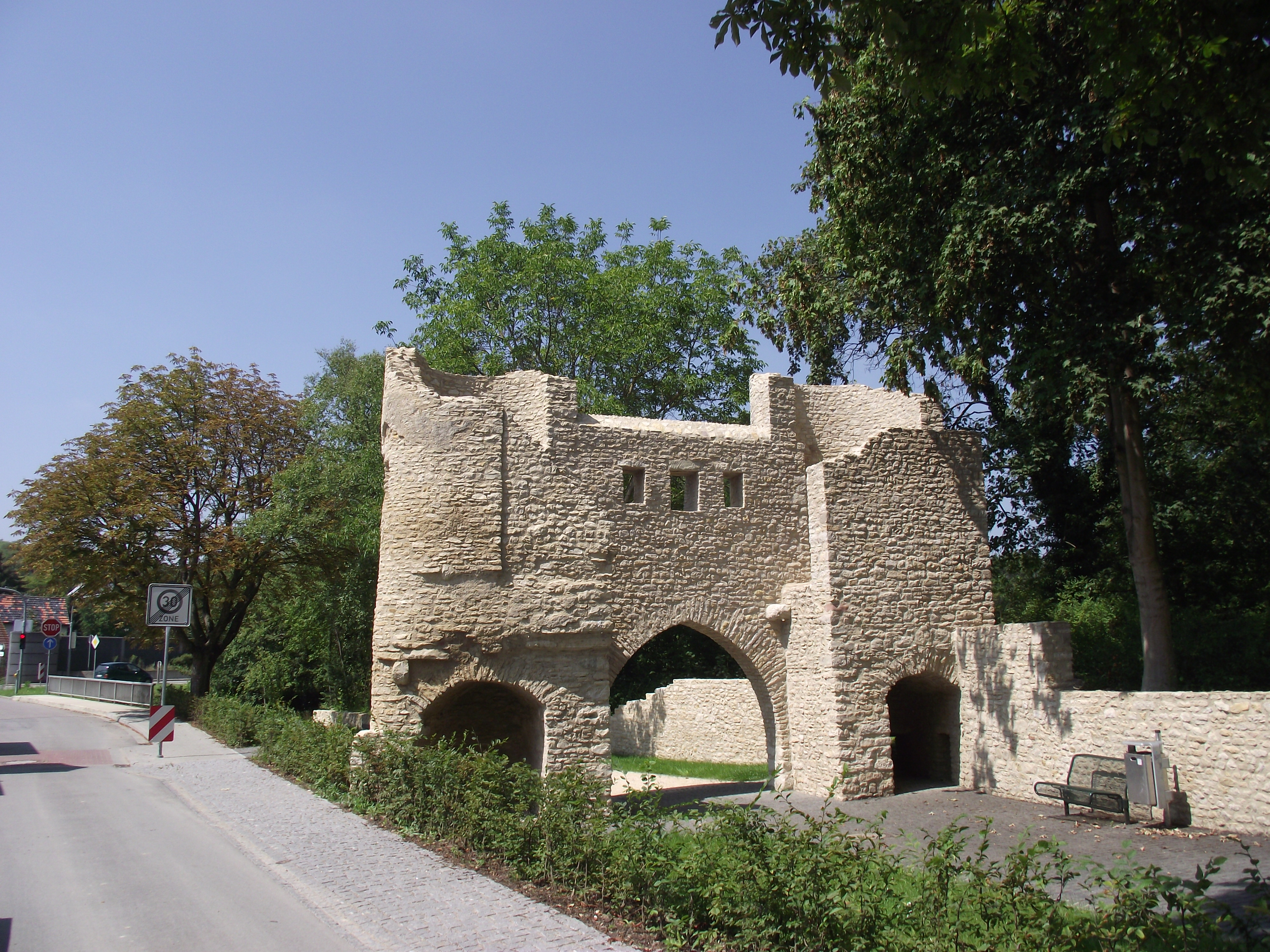
Ohrenbrückertor

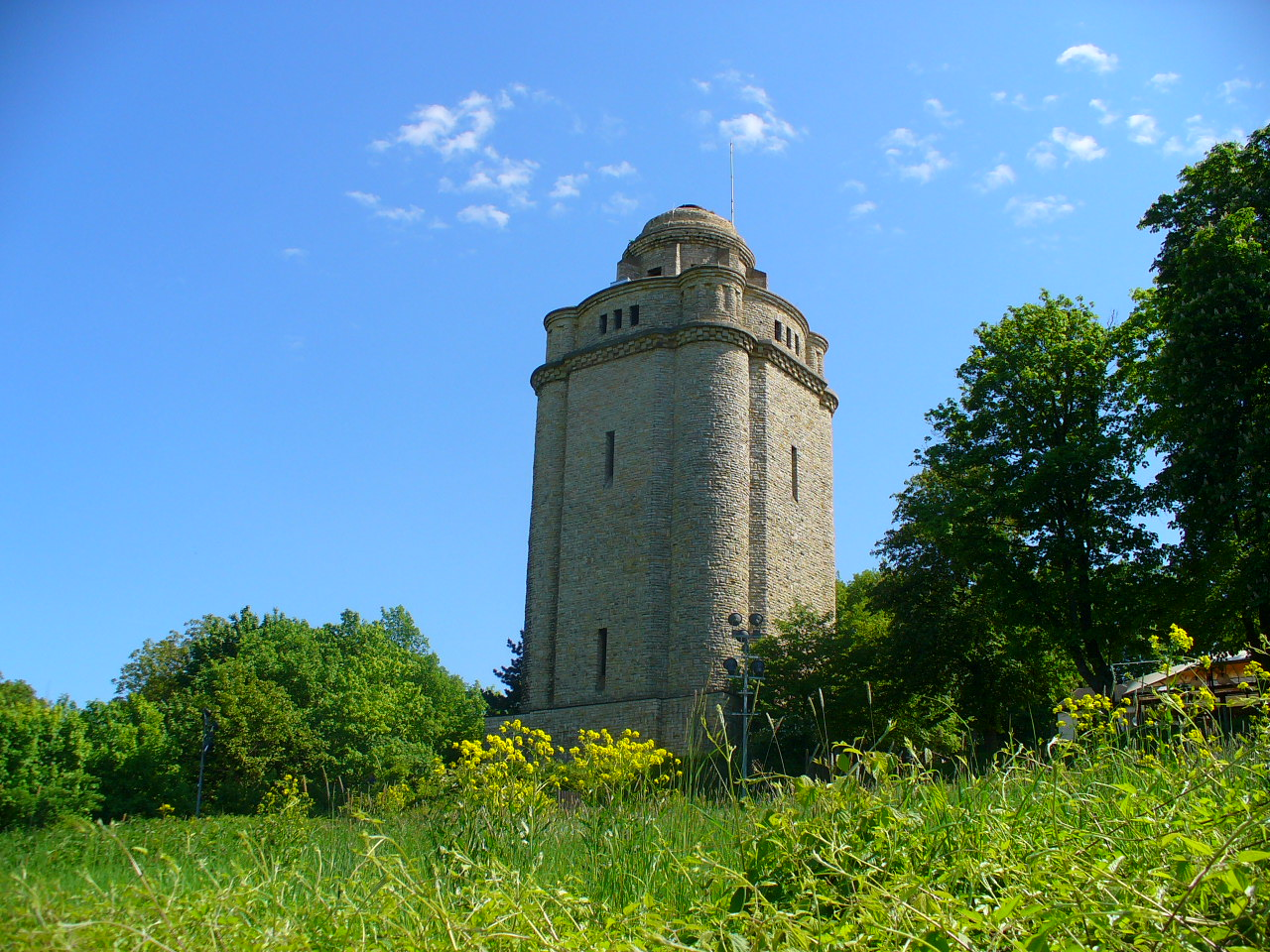
Bismarck Tower

==== Others ====
- St. Michael with Plague Cross
- Carolingian aqueduct
- Heidesheimer Tor (gate)
- Bismarck Tower
- Ohrenbrücker Tor (gate)
- Jewish graveyard
- Old market hall in Nieder-Ingelheim

=== Parks ===
- Kommerzienrat-Boehringer-Anlage
- Emmerlingscher Park
- Rosengärtchen
- Uffhubtor-Anlage

=== Natural monuments ===
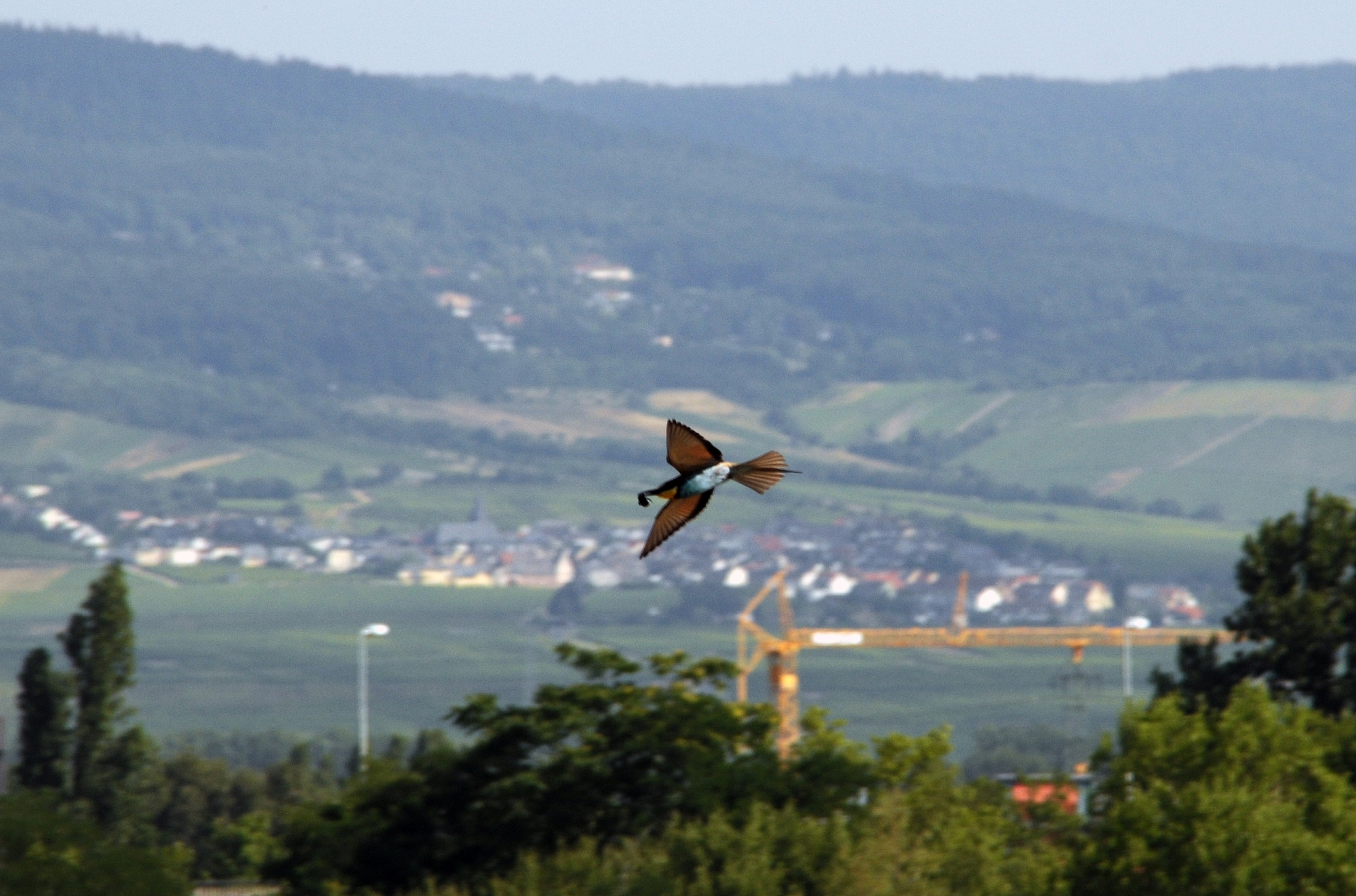
European bee-eater over Ingelheim

- Drifting chalk sands and dunes

In the cadastral areas of Nieder-Ingelheim and Frei-Weinheim, mainly north of the Autobahn along Konrad-Adenauer-Straße, but also south of the Autobahn – even within the Boehringer Ingelheim industrial lands – are found drifting chalk sands. Likewise a deposit is to be found in the area of the Griesmühle (mill).

These formations are under conservational protection under the Rhineland-Palatinate State Care Law. Damaging them or removing them, among other acts, is considered an incompensable encroachment on nature and the landscape. Municipal building uses in drifting chalk sand areas are therefore routinely excluded or only approved in very special cases. Two such exceptions were the building of Konrad-Adenauer-Straße (from the Autobahn bridge to Rheinstraße) and the building of the daycare centre on Sporkenheimer Straße.

=== Sport ===
- 1. Schwimmsportverein Ingelheim 1966 e.V. (swimming)
- RV Ingelheim
- SpVgg Ingelheim
- TUS Ober-Ingelheim
- Turngemeinde 1847 Corp. Nieder-Ingelheim (gymnastics)
- SV Ingelheim 1949 e.V.
- VfL Frei Weinheim
- HSC Ingelheim
- TV Frei-Weinheim (gymnastics)
- MFG-Ingelheim e.V. - Modellfluggruppe Ingelheim e.V.
- TSC Ingelheim
- FSC Ingelheim 07
- Bridgeclub Ingelheim

=== Regular events ===
- Since 1972 there has been a yearly folk music event, the Eurofolkfestival Ingelheim, on the Burgkirche Fairgrounds. It is said to be one of the successor festivals to the famous Waldeck-Festivals. A great number of the visitors are people from the hippie culture and youths from the local area and from throughout Germany. The number of visitors varies from 2,000 to 3,000. It is usually held between mid-June and mid-July and always lasts from Friday to Sunday. Out of the Eurofolkfestival grew the OpenOhr Festival (a youth cultural festival) in Mainz in 1974 and 1975.
- Hafenfest auf der Jungau ("Harbour Festival on the Jungau"), each year in early August.
- Ingelheimer Rotweinfest ("Ingelheim Red Wine Festival") on the Burgkirche Fairgrounds, is held each year from the last weekend in September to the first weekend in October.
- Kerb in Groß-Winternheim ("kermis, or church consecration festival"), second weekend in September
- Internationale Tage ("International Days"), each year since 1959. Organized for Boehringer Ingelheim by François Lachenal till 1997.till 2000 curated by Patricia Rochat and since then by Ulrich Luckhardt.
- Umsonst-und-drinnen, international music festival for new blood groups.
- Kinderfest der DPSG Ingelheim ("Ingelheim DPSG Children’s Festival"), each year on Ascension Day since 1969 on the Jungau in Frei-Weinheim.
- Entekerb ("Harvest Kermis"), in October in Frei-Weinheim.
- Altstadtfest ("Old Town Festival"), second weekend in August, staged by NCI
- Fest der Generationen, second Saturday in September around the old Gymnasium, staged by the MütZe

=== Culinary specialities ===
Regional Rhenish-Hessian specialities are asparagus and morello cherries (a cultivar of sour cherries).

== Economy and infrastructure ==
=== Transport ===
The Autobahn A 60 runs through the municipal area and has two interchanges there. Bundesstraße 41 ends in Ingelheim. The Autobahnen A 61 and A 63 lie right nearby. Frankfurt Airport can be reached by Autobahn in roughly 30 minutes. Frankfurt-Hahn Airport can be reached in roughly 50 minutes by Autobahnen A 60 and A 61 or Bundesstraße 50. A Bus to Hahn can be caught in Mainz

Ingelheim lies on the Mainz-Bingen-Cologne (West Rhine Railway) and Saarbrücken-Mainz-Frankfurt railway lines. Between Ingelheim-Nord and Oestrich-Winkel runs a Rhine ferry. The constituent communities and the surrounding municipalities are served by city and regional bus routes of Omnibusverkehr Rhein-Nahe GmbH. The local rail transport is served by the Rhein-Nahe-Nahverkehrsverbund.

=== Established businesses ===
- Boehringer Ingelheim, pharmaceutical enterprise
- Envision Entertainment GmbH, formerly EA Phenomic, a video game developer
- Goldener Engel, brewery
- Karl Gemünden, building company
- Rheinhessische Energie- und Wasserversorgungs-GmbH, energy and water supply
- Vereinigte Obst- und Gemüsemärkte (VOG), Europe's biggest transshipment centre for sour cherries
- WetterKontor, supplier of weather information

=== Agricultural produce ===
Of the 4,987-hectare municipal area, 641 ha is used for winegrowing and 1 373 ha is used for crops. The main agricultural produce is sour cherries, white asparagus and Wine. Although the town lies in a region dominated by white wine, 54.9% of the vineyard area in Ingelheim am Rhein is used for growing red wine varieties. With 641 ha in vineyards, the town is moreover one of Rhenish Hesse’s biggest winegrowing centres after Worms, (1,490 ha), Nierstein (783 ha), Alzey (769 ha), Westhofen (764 ha), Alsheim (704 ha) and Bechtheim (654 ha), and one of the biggest in the whole state of Rhineland-Palatinate.

"The red wines of Ingelheim and Heidesheim (…) opposite to Eltville (…) enjoy a high reputation."

The Geisenheim Grape Breeding Institute’s vegetable farming department runs an experimental asparagus field in Ingelheim. The research results can be viewed on the Internet.

=== Media ===
Local daily newspaper: Allgemeine Zeitung Ingelheim within the Rhein Main Presse, published by the Verlagsgruppe Rhein Main, Mainz.

Municipal television: "Blickpunkt Ingelheim", which is broadcast every Monday and Thursday on regional channel K3.

=== Public institutions ===
Since 1996, Ingelheim has been the seat of district administration for Mainz-Bingen.

=== Education ===
Ingelheim is home to:

- three primary schools (Präsident-Mohr-Grundschule, Theodor-Heuss-Grundschule, Brüder-Grimm-Grundschule)
- a combination primary school and Hauptschule (Pestalozzi-Grund- u. Hauptschule)
- a professional college, die BBS Ingelheim
- a school for those with learning difficulties (Albert-Schweitzer-Sonderschule)
- a Realschule (Kaiserpfalz-Realschule)
- an integrated comprehensive school (Kurt Schumacher)
- a Gymnasium (Sebastian-Münster-Gymnasium)

Under the umbrella of the Ingelheim Further Education Centre Weiterbildungszentrum Ingelheim the following institutions work:

- Volkshochschule (folk high school)
- Fridtjof-Nansen-Akademie für politische Bildung (political education)
- Music school
- Jugendbildungswerk (youth education)

== Notable people ==
=== Honorary citizens ===
- Christian Rauch (1878–1976), archaeologist, named an honorary citizen of Ingelheim 16 December 1974
- Robert Boehringer (1884–1974), entrepreneur and lyricist, named an honorary citizen of Ingelheim in 1974

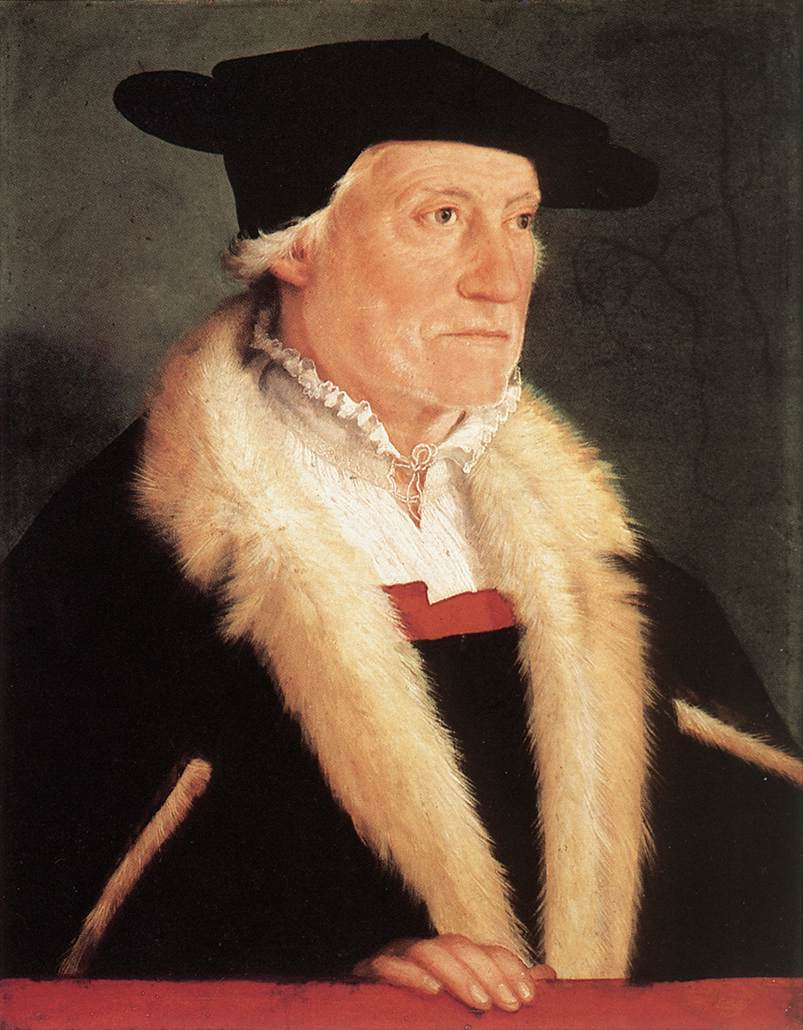
Sebastian Münster

=== Sons and daughters of the town ===
- Sebastian Münster (1488–1552), scientist (cosmographer) and a Hebraist
- Johannes Anspach (1752–1823), pastelist, draftsman, painter, owner of an artist's studio in the Netherlands
- Klaus Knopper (born 1968), developer of Linux distribution Knoppix
- Markus Kreuz (born 1977), footballer

=== Other celebrities ===
- Charlemagne (747–814), held court in Ingelheim in 807.
- Louis the Pious (778–840), died in a summer tent on an island in the Rhine off Ingelheim.
- Pope Joan Johanna von Ingelheim, according to legend she reigned as Pope from 855 to 857.
- Anselm Franz von Ingelheim (1634–1695), Archbishop-Elector of Mainz from 1679
- Jean-Baptiste Kléber (1753–1800), during the Siege of Mainz in 1793 headquartered in Ingelheim
- Eduard Douwes Dekker, known as Multatuli (1820–1887 in Ingelheim am Rhein), Dutch writer
- Richard von Weizsäcker (1920–2015), noble and politician, from 1962 to 1966 managing partner of Boehringer Ingelheim

== See also ==
Universal Synod of Ingelheim
