= King, Ingelheim =

German event venue

kING
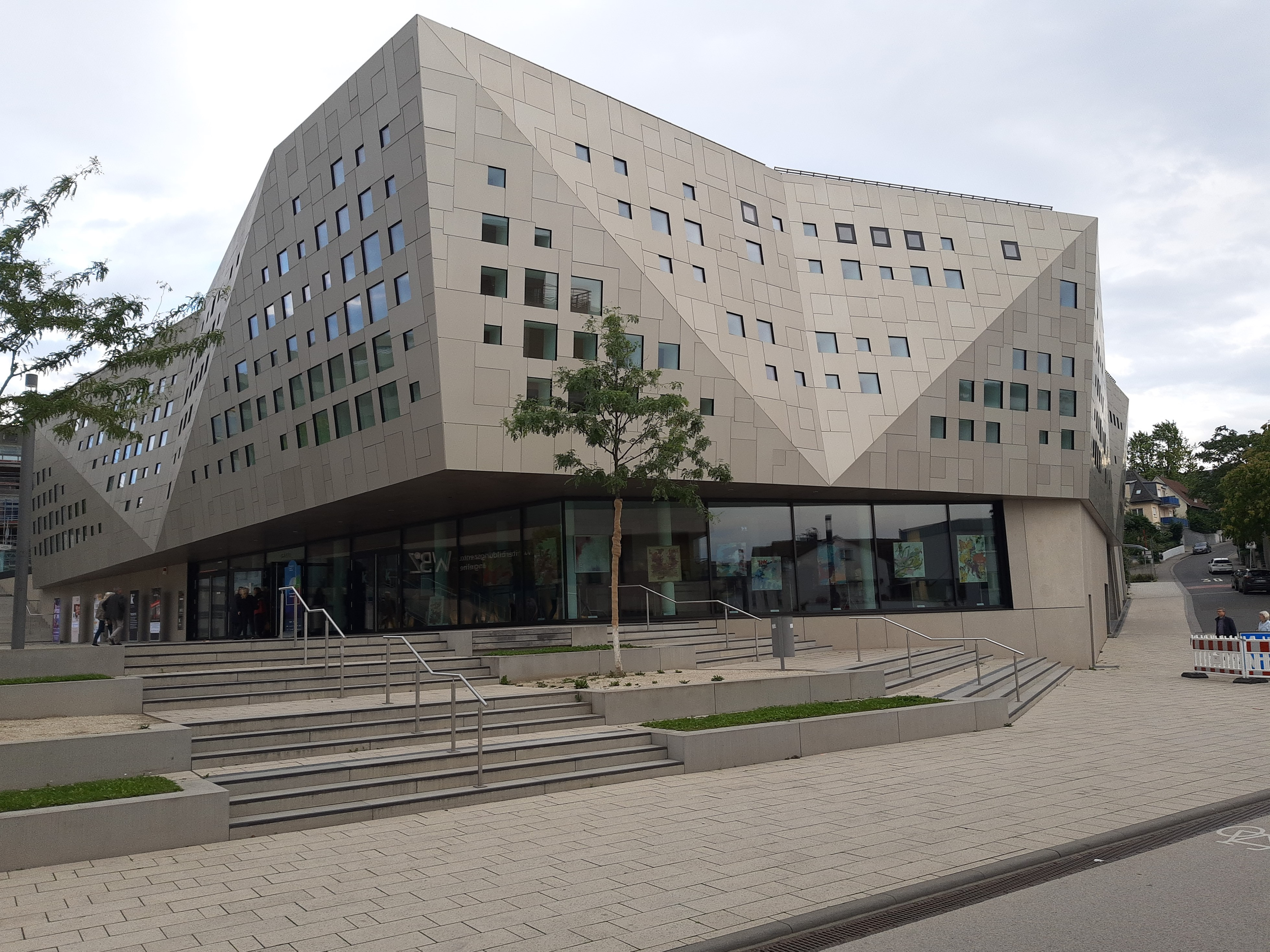
- The hall on 5 August 2023
- Interactive map of kING
- Location: Ingelheim, Rheinland-Pfalz, Germany
- Coordinates: 49.9741°N 8.0573°E

Construction
- Opened: 2017

King, styled kING, is a venue for cultural events and conventions in Ingelheim, Rheinland-Pfalz, Germany, completed in 2017. The German description is Kultur- und Kongresszentrum, or Kultur- und Veranstaltungshalle Ingelheim. It offers a large hall (Großer Saal) and five smaller rooms. The k in the name stands for Kultur (culture), and the ING for Ingelheim.

== Building ==
The hall is located in the centre of Ingelheim, in walking distance from the station. It was commissioned by the town of Ingelheim, and completed in 2017.

The main hall seats an audience of 624, and 1000 when the balcony is included. The hall has been used for theatre, concerts, shows, and cabaret, among others.
