= Selztaldom =

Church building in Rhineland-Palatinate, Germany

Coordinates: 49°56′31″N 8°05′03″E

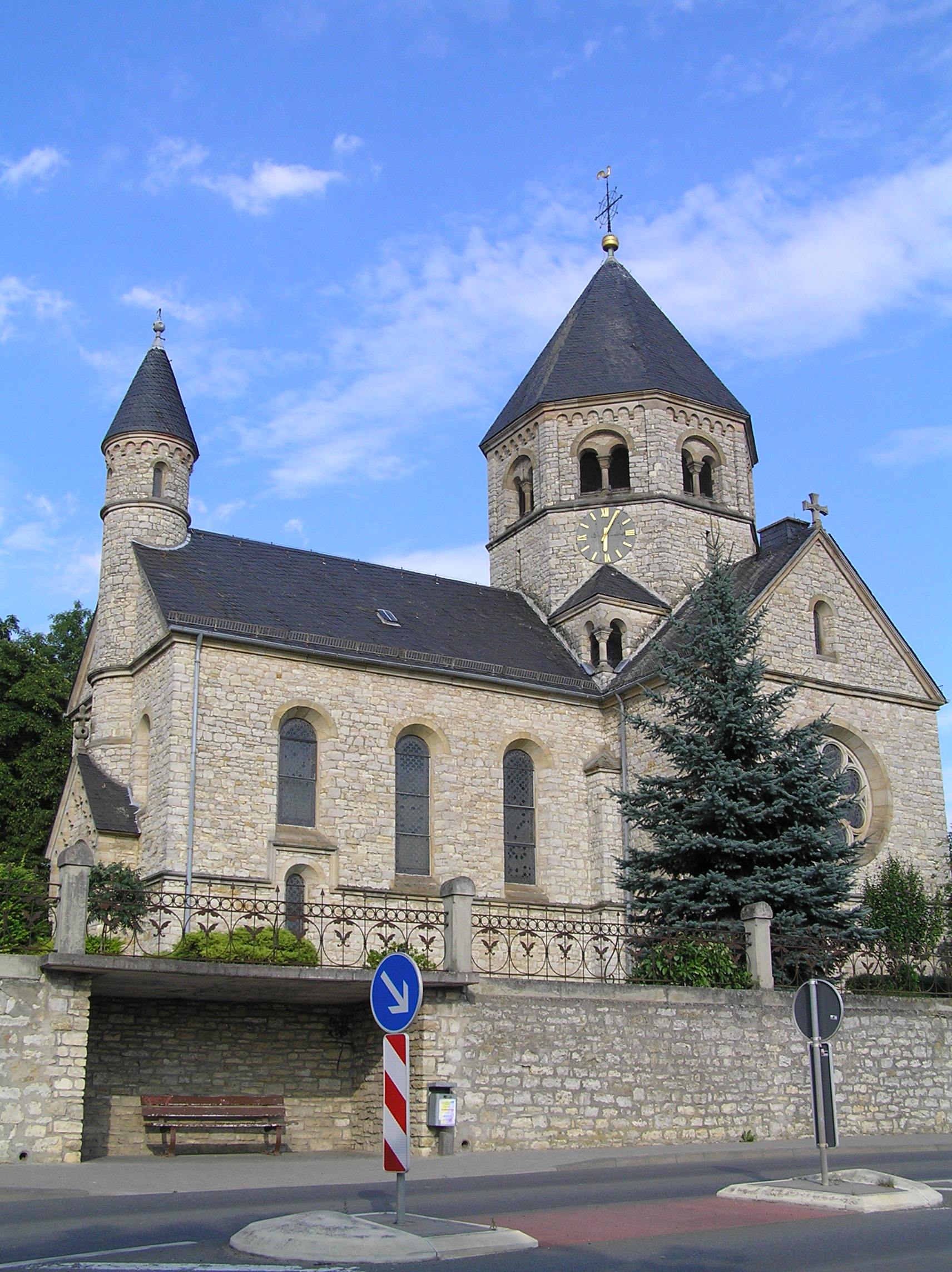
Selztaldom, view from the main road

The Evangelische Pfarrkirche in Großwinternheim, part of Ingelheim am Rhein, also called Selztaldom meaning Selz valley cathedral, is a romanesque revival aisleless church built according to Romanesque architecture blueprints from the Middle Rhine. The building is protected by cultural heritage management.

== History ==
The church was erected in 1888 according to the drawings of Heinrich von Schmidt (Munich) on the cemetery, still in use. The building time was two years. It replaced the old church in the village center, being now the fire brigade's home.

== Architecture ==
=== Exterior ===
The church is built as hall church in southward direction with a short nave and crossing as well as a diminished apse.

== Literature ==
- Dieter Krienke, Kreis Mainz-Bingen. Städte Bingen und Ingelheim, Gemeinde Budenheim, Verbandsgemeinden Gau-Algesheim, Heidesheim, Rhein-Nahe und Sprendlingen-Gensingen (= Kulturdenkmäler in Rheinland-Pfalz. Denkmaltopographie Bundesrepublik Deutschland. Band 18.1). Wernersche Verlagsgesellschaft, Worms 2007, ISBN 978-3-88462-231-5.
- Georg Dehio, Rheinland-Pfalz / Saarland, Deutscher Kunstverlag, 1972, p. 275
