= 1957–58 Rheinlandliga =

1. Amateurliga Rheinland
- Season: 1957–58
- Champions: Sportfreunde Herdorf
- Relegated: SC Eitelborn, VfL Bad Ems, SV Ehrang, Fortuna Kottenheim

The 1957–58 Rheinlandliga was the sixth season of the highest amateur class of the Rhineland Football Association under the name of 1. Amateurliga Rheinland. It was a predecessor of today's Rheinlandliga. It was the second season in which the league played with two game divisions, East and West. The Rhineland champion was determined through a game between the division champions.

The 1. Amateurliga was below II. Division Southwest until 1963 and therefore the third-class in the hierarchy. In the seasons 1956–57 to 1962–63 the league was played in two divisions (East and West). The two division champions played to determine the Rhineland champion. With the introduction of the regional league Southwest as second highest class, starting in the 1963–64 season, the Amateur league Rheinland was again combined into one division. Beginning in the 1974–75 season, the league played a role as a sub-team to the newly introduced 2. Bundesliga, where the Rhineland champion played in a relegation against the champion of the Verbandsliga Südwest and the Saarlandliga, for a position in the south divisions of the 2. Bundesliga. Starting from the 1978–79 season, the Oberliga Rheinland-Pfalz/Saar was introduced as the highest amateur class and this class was renamed to the "Verbandsliga Rheinland" and since then only fourth class.

== Results ==
Rhineland champion was the winner of the East division, Sportfreunde Herdorf, after a victory over the West division champion TuS Mayen. During the subsequent rise to the II. Division Southwest, Herdorfe was not successful and had to remain in the amateur league. At the end of this season, SC Eitelborn, VfL Bad Ems, SV Ehrang and Fortuna Kottenheim had to move down to the 2. Amateur league.

For the following season 1958-59, promoted from the 2. Amateur league were:

- From the East division: SV Woppenrath, SV Trier-West
- From the West division: TuS Diez, SV Hönningen

For the following season 1958-59, teams that descended from the II.Division were:

- From the East division: VfL Neuwied
- From the West division: Germania Metternich

SpVgg Bendorf, FC Urbar, Eintracht Höhr-Grenzhausen and SSV Heimbach-Weis switched to the West division after the season.

SV Neuwied, SpVgg Andernach Amat., SC Sinzig and SC 07 Bad Neuenahr switched to the East division after the season.

=== East Division ===
Rank	Club	Matches	Goals	Points
1.	Sportfreunde Herdorf (A)	22	90:25	38:6
2.	TuS Montabaur	22	45:43	25:19
3.	Adler Niederfischbach	22	43:42	23:21
4.	SpVgg Bendorf	22	55:62	23:21
5.	FC Urbar	22	43:39	22:22
6.	VfB Wissen (N)	22	64:39	21:23
7.	SG Betzdorf	22	42:42	21:23
8.	Eintracht Höhr-Grenzhausen	22	47:64	21:23
9.	SC Eitelborn	22	45:56	20:24
10.	SSV Heimbach-Weis (N)	22	40:53	19:25
11.	SC Wirges	22	53:64	18:26
12.	VfL Bad Ems	22	40:77	13:31

=== West Division ===
Rang	Verein	Spiele	Tore	Punkte
1.	TuS Mayen	22	67:33	32:12
2.	Rheinland Mayen	22	65:39	28:16
3.	FC Bitburg (M)	22	55:57	24:20
4.	TuS Mosella Schweich (N)	22	51:42	22:22
5.	Fortuna Saarburg	22	36:39	22:22
6.	SC Moselweiß	22	54:58	22:22
7.	SV Neuwied	22	38:44	22:22
8.	SpVgg Andernach Amat.	22	50:44	21:23
9.	SC Sinzig	22	46:46	21:23
10.	SC 07 Bad Neuenahr	22	43:46	20:24
11.	SV Ehrang	22	48:57	20:24
12.	Fortuna Kottenheim	22	25:69	10:34

	Division Champion
	Relegation to 2. Amateur League
(M)	Previous year's champions
(A)	Previous year's descendants from the 2nd Division
(N)	Previous year's climbers from the 2. Amateur League
