= 1955–56 Rheinlandliga =

1. Amateurliga Rheinland
- Season: 1955–56
- Champions: SV Niederlahnstein
- Relegated: Sportfreunde Daaden, Grün-Weiß Vallendar

The 1955–56 Rheinlandliga was the fourth season of the highest amateur class of the Rhineland Football Association under the name of 1. Amateurliga Rheinland. It was a predecessor of today's Rheinlandliga.

The 1. Amateurliga was below II. Division Southwest until 1963 and therefore the third-class in the hierarchy. In the seasons 1956–57 to 1962–63 the league was played in two divisions (East and West). The two division champions played to determine the Rhineland champion. With the introduction of the regional league Southwest as second highest class, starting in the 1963–64 season, the Amateur league Rheinland was again combined into one division. Beginning in the 1974–75 season, the league played a role as a sub-team to the newly introduced 2. Bundesliga, where the Rhineland champion played in a relegation against the champion of the Verbandsliga Südwest and the Saarlandliga, for a position in the south divisions of the 2. Bundesliga. Starting from the 1978–79 season, the Oberliga Rheinland-Pfalz/Saar was introduced as the highest amateur class and this class was renamed to the "Verbandsliga Rheinland" and since then only fourth class.

== Results ==
Rhineland champion was SV Niederlahnstein, who rose through a second-place finish in the relegation round to the II. Division Southwest. As a Rhineland representative, Niederlahnstein also participated in the German football amateur championship 1956 and lost in the elimination game against Berlin's representative BFC Südring with 1–2. Sportfreunde Daaden and TuS Konz had to move down to the 2. Amateur League after this season. For the following season 1956–57, which was played with two divisions, FC Bitburg, Fortuna Kottenheim, Fortuna Saarburg, Germania Metternich, SC Moselweiss, SC Eitelborn, SG Betzdorf, Sportfreunde Herdorf, SV Trier-West, TuS Diez, and TuS Mayen moved up from the 2. Amateur League.

Rank	Club	Matches	Goals	Points
1.	SV Niederlahnstein	28	82:42	39:17
2.	VfL Bad Ems (N)	28	85:49	36:20
3.	SC Wirges	28	74:59	35:21
4.	SC Bad Neuenahr (A)	28	85:55	32:24
5.	SpVgg Bendorf	28	78:54	32:24
6.	SpVgg Neuwied	28	54:40	31:25
7.	SV Ehrang	28	60:57	31:25
8.	SpVgg Andernach (N)	28	73:60	30:26
9.	TuS Montabaur	28	52:49	28:28
10.	SC Sinzig	28	66:68	28:28
11.	Eintracht Höhr	28	56:60	26:30
12.	SV Niederfischbach (N)	28	57:79	26:30
13.	TuS Konz (N)	28	45:79	20:36
14.	Grün-Weiß Vallendar	28	36:81	15:41
15.	Sportfreunde Daaden	28	53:113	11:45

	Amateur League Champion Southwest
	Relegation to 2. Amateur League
(M)	Previous year's champions
(A)	Previous year's descendants from the 2nd Division
(N)	Previous year's climbers from the 2. Amateur League
