= 1973–74 Rheinlandliga =

1. Amateurliga Rheinland
- Season: 1973–74
- Champions: SV Leiwen
- Relegated: SV Speicher, VfB Lützel, Alemannia Plaidt, FV Engers

The 1973–74 Rheinlandliga was the 22nd season of the highest amateur class of the Rhineland Football Association under the name of 1. Amateurliga Rheinland. It was a predecessor of today's Rheinlandliga.

== Results ==
The Rhineland champion was SV Leiwen. With the introduction of the two-division 2nd soccer Bundesliga this season, there were no newcomers from the amateur league. SV Leiwen represented Rhineland in the 1974 German Soccer Amateur Championship and lost in the first round to ASV Herzogenaurach (Bavaria).

SV Speicher, VfB Lützel, Alemannia Plaidt and FV Engers had to move down to the 2. Amateur league. For the following 1974–75 season, Ahrweiler BC, TuS Bad Marienberg and FC Bitburg moved up from the 2. A mature league, as well as a descendants from the Regional league, TuS Neuendorf and Sportfreunde Eisbachtal.

Rank	Clubs	Games	Goals	Points
1.	SV Leiwen	30	73:21	47:13
2.	Eintracht Trier (A)	30	86:47	39:21
3.	SC 07 Bad Neuenahr	30	55:42	39:21
4.	TuS Mayen (N)	30	67:42	38:22
5.	VfL Neuwied	30	57:38	38:22
6.	SpVgg Andernach (M)	30	76:59	35:25
7.	SV Ellingen (N)	30	57:52	34:26
8.	SpVgg Bendorf	30	51:56	32:38
9.	VfB Wissen	30	44:38	30:30
10.	SC Sinzig	30	61:64	30:30
11.	SG Eintracht Lahnstein	30	55:47	28:32
12.	SV Remagen	30	44:69	26:34
13.	SV Speicher (N)	30	48:69	25:35
14.	VfB Lützel	30	28:77	15:45
15.	Alemannia Plaidt	30	37 :76	14 :46
16.	FV Engers	30	44 :86	10 :50

	Division Champion
	Relegation to 2. Amateur League
(M)	Previous year's champions
(A)	Previous year's descendants from the 2nd Division
(N)	Previous year's climbers from the 2. Amateur League
