= 1972–73 Rheinlandliga =

1. Amateurliga Rheinland
- Season: 1972–73
- Champions: SpVgg Andernach
- Relegated: Eintracht Höhr-Grenzhausen, Ahrweiler BC, SV Ehrang

The 1972–73 Rheinlandliga was the 21st season of the highest amateur class of the Rhineland Football Association under the name of 1. Amateurliga Rheinland. It was a predecessor of today's Rheinlandliga.

== Results ==
Last years relegation team from the Regional League, SpVgg Andernach, became Rhineland champion. SC Oberlahnstein represented Rhineland in the 1973 German Soccer Amateur Championship and lost in the second round to the amateurs of 1. FC Kaiserslautern (Südwest). All three newcomers, Eintracht Höhr-Grenzhausen, Ahrweiler BC and SV Ehrang moved down 2. Amateur league. For the following 1973–74 season, SV Speicher, TuS Mayen and SV Ellingen came up from the 2. Amateur League, as well as a descendant from the Regional league, Eintracht Trier.

SC Oberlahnstein and SV Niederlahnstein merged after the season to become SG Eintracht Lahnstein.

Rank	Clubs	Games	Goals	Points
1.	SpVgg Andernach (A)	30	81:37	45:15
2.	SC Oberlahnstein	30	92:57	40:20
3.	SC Sinzig	30	71:52	39:21
4.	SV Leiwen	30	65:41	38:22
5.	VfB Wissen	30	61:39	27:33
6.	SC 07 Bad Neuenahr	30	51:39	36:24
7.	Alemannia Plaidt	30	55:50	29:31
8.	SpVgg Bendorf	30	49:52	29:31
9.	VfL Neuwied	30	38:48	27:33
10.	SV Remagen	30	46:69	25:35
11.	FV Engers	30	54:60	24:36
12.	SV Niederlahnstein	30	47:78	24:36
13.	VfB Lützel	30	51:63	23:37
14.	Eintracht Höhr-Grenzhausen (N)	30	40:63	23:37
15.	Ahrweiler BC (N)	30	38:63	23:37
16.	SV Ehrang (N)	30	41:71	18:42

	Division Champion
	Relegation to 2. Amateur League
(M)	Previous year's champions
(A)	Previous year's descendants from the 2nd Division
(N)	Previous year's climbers from the 2. Amateur League
