= 1969–70 Rheinlandliga =

1. Amateurliga Rheinland
- Season: 1969–70
- Champions: VfL Neuwied
- Relegated: VfL Trier, TuS Bad Marienberg, BSV Weißenthurm

The 1969–70 Rheinlandliga was the 18th season of the highest amateur class of the Rhineland Football Association under the name of 1. Amateurliga Rheinland. It was a predecessor of today's Rheinlandliga.

== Results ==
Rhineland champion was last year's champion VfL Neuwied. SpVgg Bendorf took part as the representative for Rhineland in the 1970 German Soccer Amateur Championship and lost in the final round to representative from Saarland, FV Eppelborn.

VfL Trier, TuS Bad Marienberg and BSV Weißenthurm had to move down to the 2. Amateur League. Eintracht Trier II, FV Rübenach and Sportfreunde Eisbachtal came as newcomers from the 2. Amateur League for the following 1970–71 season.

Rank	Clubs	Games	Goals	Points
1.	VfL Neuwied	30	63:36	46:14
2.	SpVgg Bendorf	30	74:31	44:16
3.	SC Oberlahnstein (N)	30	71:64	36:24
4.	SSV Mülheim	30	53:38	35:25
5.	Alemannia Plaidt	30	60:46	34:26
6.	SpVgg Andernach	30	61:52	34:26
7.	SC Sinzig	30	66:50	32:28
8.	SC 07 Bad Neuenahr	30	54:54	31:29
9.	SV Niederlahnstein	30	49:52	31:29
10.	FV Engers (N)	30	53:60	26:34
11.	VfB Wissen	30	43:54	26:34
12.	Germania Metternich	30	46:69	24:36
13.	VfB Lützel	30	45:61	23:37
14.	VfL Trier (N)	30	44:68	21:39
15.	TuS Bad Marienberg	30	37:57	20:40
16.	BSV Weißenthurm	30	38:65	17:43

	Division Champion
	Relegation to 2. Amateur League
(M)	Previous year's champions
(A)	Previous year's descendants from the 2nd Division
(N)	Previous year's climbers from the 2. Amateur League
