= 1963–64 Rheinlandliga =

1. Amateurliga Rheinland
- Season: 1963–64
- Champions: Germania Metternich
- Relegated: SV Elkenroth, SSV Heimbach-Weis, Sportfreunde Herdorf

The 1963–64 Rheinlandliga was the 12th season of the highest amateur class of the Rhineland Football Association under the name of 1. Amateurliga Rheinland. It was a predecessor of today's Rheinlandliga.

== Results ==
Rhineland champion was the relegation team from the previous season, Germania Metternich. Metternich also represented the South West in the German soccer amateur championship in 1964, but failed in the knock-out game with a 5–1 loss against the Berlin representative BFC Viktoria 1889.

The relegation to the second amateur league was SV Elkenroth, SSV Heimbach-Weis and the Sportfreunde Herdorf.

For the following season 1964–65, TuS Mosella Schweich, SG Altenkirchen and SC 07 Bad Neuenahr came up from the 2. Amateur League, as well as descendant from the II. Division, SV Niederlahnstein.

Rank	Clubs	Games	Goals	Points
1.	Germania Metternich (A)	30	86:38	50:10
2.	SSV Mülheim (N)	30	84:52	40:20
3.	SpVgg Bendorf	30	87:56	38:22
4.	FV Engers (A)	30	59:52	37:23
5.	SpVgg Andernach	30	59:45	36:24
6.	Alemannia Plaidt	30	57:55	34:26
7.	TuS Mayen	30	73:64	33:27
8.	SC Sinzig	30	65:62	30:30
9.	BSV Weißenthurm	30	74:73	29:31
10.	VfL Trier	30	66:61	28:32
11.	VfB Wissen (A)	30	64:63	27:33
12.	VfL Neuwied	30	47:54	27:33
13.	SC Oberlahnstein	30	57:80	22:38
14.	SV Elkenroth	30	47:72	21:39
15.	SSV Heimbach-Weis	30	45:98	16:44
16.	Sportfreunde Herdorf	30	44:89	12:48

	Division Champion
	Relegation to 2. Amateur League
(M)	Previous year's champions
(A)	Previous year's descendants from the 2nd Division
(N)	Previous year's climbers from the 2. Amateur League
