= 1967–68 Rheinlandliga =

1. Amateurliga Rheinland
- Season: 1967–68
- Champions: SC Sinzig
- Relegated: FC Bitburg, FV Engers, VfL Trier, SG Altenkirchen

The 1967–68 Rheinlandliga was the 16th season of the highest amateur class of the Rhineland Football Association under the name of 1. Amateurliga Rheinland. It was a predecessor of today's Rheinlandliga.

== Results ==
Rhineland champion was SC Sinzig, who participated as a Rhineland representative at the German football amateur championship 1968 and failed there, in the round of 16, to the Württemberg representative SSV Reutlingen 05.

The relegation to the second amateur league was made by SV Ehrang, FV Rübenach, and FC Horchheim.

For the following 1968–69 season, FC Bitburg, FV Engers, VfL Trier and SG Altenkirchen moved up from the 2. The amateur league, as well as descendant SSV Mülheim from the II. Division.

Rank	Clubs	Games	Goals	Points
1.	SC Sinzig	30	67:38	40:20
2.	SpVgg Andernach	30	59:46	40:20
3.	SC 07 Bad Neuenahr	30	58:38	39:21
4.	Sportfreunde Herdorf	30	70:69	35:25
5.	SpVgg Bendorf	30	77:57	34:26
6.	Alemannia Plaidt	30	72:72	33:27
7.	Germania Metternich (A)	30	54:43	31:29
8.	TuS Mayen	30	49:53	30:30
9.	BSV Weißenthurm	30	55:62	30:30
10.	VfL Neuwied	30	63:57	28:32
11.	TuS Marienberg	30	51:50	27:33
12.	SV Niederlahnstein (N)	30	57:61	26:34
13.	FC Bitburg (N)	30	50:59	26:34
14.	FV Engers	30	64:81	24:36
15.	VfL Trier	30	42:67	19:41
16.	SG Altenkirchen (N)	30	46:81	18:42

	Division Champion
	Relegation to 2. Amateur League
(M)	Previous year's champions
(A)	Previous year's descendants from the 2nd Division
(N)	Previous year's climbers from the 2. Amateur League
