= 1971–72 Rheinlandliga =

1. Amateurliga Rheinland
- Season: 1971–72
- Champions: Sportfreunde Eisbachtal
- Relegated: SSV Mülheim, Germania Metternich, ESG Betzdorf

The 1971–72 Rheinlandliga was the 20th season of the highest amateur class of the Rhineland Football Association under the name of 1. Amateurliga Rheinland. It was a predecessor of today's Rheinlandliga.

== Results ==
Sportfreunde Eisbachtal became Rheinland Champion. VfB Wissen represented Rhineland at the 1972 German Football Amateur Championship and lost early in the preliminary rounds against MTV Ingolstadt (Bavaria). SSV Mülheim, Germania Metternich and newcomer ESG Betzdorf had to move down to the 2. Amateur league. For the following 1972–73 season, newcomers from the 2. Amateur League were SV Ehrang, BC Ahrweiler and Eintracht Höhr-Grenzhausen and from the Regional league, last years champion, SpVgg Andernach:

Rank	Clubs	Games	Goals	Points
1.	Sportfreunde Eisbachtal	30	85:29	48:12
2.	VfB Wissen	30	80:28	44:16
3.	SC Sinzig	30	53:29	40:20
4.	SC Oberlahnstein	30	71:42	38:22
5.	SV Niederlahnstein	30	64:36	36:24
6.	SV Remagen (N)	30	63:50	36:24
7.	SV Leiwen (N)	30	50:56	32:28
8.	Alemannia Plaidt	30	33:42	27:33
9.	FV Engers	30	65:65	26:34
10.	VfB Lützel	30	45:63	25:35
11.	SpVgg Bendorf	30	49:68	24:36
12.	SC 07 Bad Neuenahr	30	47:67	24:36
13.	VfL Neuwied	30	44:54	23:37
14.	SSV Mülheim	30	40:71	22:38
15.	Germania Metternich	30	35:75	19:41
16.	ESG Betzdorf (N)	30	37:86	16:44

	Division Champion
	Relegation to 2. Amateur League
(M)	Previous year's champions
(A)	Previous year's descendants from the 2nd Division
(N)	Previous year's climbers from the 2. Amateur League
