= 1970–71 Rheinlandliga =

1. Amateurliga Rheinland
- Season: 1970–71
- Champions: SpVgg Andernach
- Relegated: FV Rübenach, Eintracht Trier II

The 1970–71 Rheinlandliga was the 19th season of the highest amateur class of the Rhineland Football Association under the name of 1. Amateurliga Rheinland. It was a predecessor of today's Rheinlandliga.

== Results ==
SpVgg Andernach became Rheinland Champion. Sportfreunde Eisbachtal represented Rhineland in the 1971 German Soccer Amateur Championship and lost in the quarterfinals against SC Jülich (Middle Rhine).

FV Rübenach and Eintracht Trier II had to move down to the 2. Amateur League. For the following 1971–72 season, ESG Betzdorf, SV Leiwen and SV Remagen moved up.

Rank	Clubs	Games	Goals	Points
1.	SpVgg Andernach	30	76:32	46:14
2.	Sportfreunde Eisbachtal (N)	30	86:39	45:15
3.	SC Sinzig	30	60:38	41:19
4.	VfL Neuwied (M)	30	59:40	38:22
5.	SC Oberlahnstein	30	67:54	36:24
6.	SV Niederlahnstein	30	41:43	33:27
7.	SC Bad Neuenahr	30	40:43	30:30
8.	Alemannia Plaidt	30	51:36	29:31
9.	SSV Mülheim	30	49:48	26:34
10.	VfB Lützel	30	63:62	26:34
11.	VfB Wissen	30	46:46	26:34
12.	FV Engers	30	47:77	25:35
13.	SpVgg Bendorf	30	37:60	24:36
14.	Germania Metternich	30	44:63	22:38
15.	FV Rübenach (N)	30	39:74	20:40
16.	Eintracht Trier II (N)	30	29:81	13:47

	Division Champion
	Relegation to 2. Amateur League
(M)	Previous year's champions
(A)	Previous year's descendants from the 2nd Division
(N)	Previous year's climbers from the 2. Amateur League
