= 1965–66 Rheinlandliga =

1. Amateurliga Rheinland
- Season: 1965–66
- Champions: Germania Metternich
- Relegated: FC Horchheim, SV Ehrang, TuS Marienberg

The 1965–66 Rheinlandliga was the 14th season of the highest amateur class of the Rhineland Football Association under the name of 1. Amateurliga Rheinland. It was a predecessor of today's Rheinlandliga.

== Results ==
Rhineland champion was Germania Metternich. SSV Mülheim participated as a Rhineland representative in the German football amateur championship 1966, failed in the quarter finale against the Baden representative Amicitia Viernheim.

The relegation to the second amateur league was made by the newcomer SV Prüm and SV Niederlahnstein.

For the subsequent 1966–67 season, FC Horchheim, SV Ehrang and TuS Marienberg came up from the 2. Amateur league.

Rank	Clubs	Games	Goals	Points
1.	Germania Metternich (A)	30	84:35	45:15
2.	SSV Mülheim	30	82:42	41:19
3.	BSV Weißenthurm	30	71:52	37:23
4.	FV Engers	30	60:55	36:24
5.	Alemannia Plaidt	30	83:64	35:25
6.	SC Sinzig	30	79:74	34:26
7.	Sportfreunde Herdorf	30	72:66	33:27
8.	SC 07 Bad Neuenahr	30	55:52	30:30
9.	FV Rübenach (N)	30	61:73	29:31
10.	VfL Neuwied	30	75:62	29:31
11.	SpVgg Andernach	30	65:65	27:33
12.	TuS Mayen	30	56:58	27:33
13.	VfL Trier	30	45:50	27:33
14.	SpVgg Bendorf (M)	30	58:78	26:34
15.	SV Prüm (N)	30	50:106	14:46
16.	SV Niederlahnstein	30	47:111	10:50

	Division Champion
	Relegation to 2. Amateur League
(M)	Previous year's champions
(A)	Previous year's descendants from the 2nd Division
(N)	Previous year's climbers from the 2. Amateur League
