= 1966–67 Rheinlandliga =

1. Amateurliga Rheinland
- Season: 1966–67
- Champions: SSV Mülheim
- Relegated: SG Altenkirchen, FC Bitburg, SV Niederlahnstein

The 1966–67 Rheinlandliga was the 15th season of the highest amateur class of the Rhineland Football Association under the name of 1. Amateurliga Rheinland. It was a predecessor of today's Rheinlandliga.

== Results ==
Rhineland champion was SSV Mülheim. FV Engers 07 took part as a Rhineland representative at the German football amateur championship 1967, failed there, in the round of the last 16, against Niederrhein representative Bayer Uerdingen.

For the relegation to the second amateur league, last seasons teams that moved up, SV Ehrang and FC Horchheim, as well as FV Rübenach had to move down.

For the following 1967/68 season, SG Altenkirchen, FC Bitburg and SV Niederlahnstein moved up from the 2. Amateur league, as well as Germania Metternich, who moved down from the II.Division.

Rank	Clubs	Games	Goals	Points
1.	SSV Mülheim	30	73:34	41:19
2.	FV Engers 07	30	56:38	36:24
3.	SC 07 Bad Neuenahr	30	80:50	35:25
4.	Alemannia Plaidt	30	71:58	35:25
5.	VfL Trier	30	61:51	33:27
6.	SC Sinzig	30	62:52	33:27
7.	TuS Marienberg (N)	30	62:55	32:28
8.	Sportfreunde Herdorf	30	52:62	32:28
9.	SpVgg Andernach	30	49:45	30:30
10.	SpVgg Bendorf	30	64:67	29:31
11.	TuS Mayen	30	53:57	27:33
12.	BSV Weißenthurm	30	39:61	27:33
13.	VfL Neuwied	30	50:58	26:34
14.	SV Ehrang (N)	30	44:55	25:35
15.	FV Rübenach	30	54:74	24:36
16.	FC Horchheim (N)	30	30:83	15:45

	Division Champion
	Relegation to 2. Amateur League
(M)	Previous year's champions
(A)	Previous year's descendants from the 2nd Division
(N)	Previous year's climbers from the 2. Amateur League
