= 1968–69 Rheinlandliga =

1. Amateurliga Rheinland
- Season: 1968–69
- Champions: SSV Mülheim
- Relegated: Sportfreunde Herdorf, VfB Wissen, SV Ruwer, TuS Mayen

The 1968–69 Rheinlandliga was the 17th season of the highest amateur class of the Rhineland Football Association under the name of 1. Amateurliga Rheinland. It was a predecessor of today's Rheinlandliga.

== Results ==
Rhineland champion was last year's champion SSV Mülheim. SV Niederlahnstein participated as a Rhineland representative in the German football amateur championship 1969, failed there, in the round of the last 16, to the South Baden representative FC Emmendingen.

The relegation into the 2. Amateur League was made by Sportfreunde Herdorf, VfB Wissen, SV Ruwer and TuS Mayen. For the following 1969–70 season, VfL Trier, FV Engers and SC Oberlahnstein moved up from the 2. Amateur League.

Rank	Clubs	Games	Goals	Points
1.	SSV Mülheim (A)	30	65:26	44:16
2.	SpVgg Andernach	30	70:31	43:17
3.	SV Niederlahnstein	30	72:44	43:17
4.	Alemannia Plaidt	30	77:59	37:23
5.	SC 07 Bad Neuenahr	30	60:49	33:27
6.	VfL Neuwied	30	59:56	32:28
7.	SpVgg Bendorf	30	53:67	32:28
8.	SC Sinzig (M)	30	70:51	29:31
9.	TuS Bad Marienberg	30	47:56	27:33
10.	Germania Metternich	30	54:66	26:34
11.	VfB Lützel (N)	30	43:55	24:36
12.	BSV Weißenthurm	30	53:73	24:36
13.	Sportfreunde Herdorf	30	43:52	23:37
14.	VfB Wissen (N)	30	46:59	23:37
15.	SV Ruwer (N)	30	56:84	22:38
16.	TuS Mayen	30	46:86	18:42

	Division Champion
	Relegation to 2. Amateur League
(M)	Previous year's champions
(A)	Previous year's descendants from the 2nd Division
(N)	Previous year's climbers from the 2. Amateur League
