= 1958–59 Rheinlandliga =

1. Amateurliga Rheinland
- Season: 1958–59
- Champions: Germania Metternich
- Relegated: SpVgg Andernach Amat., SG Betzdorf, SV Bendorf, SV Woppenrath

The 1958–59 Rheinlandliga was the seventh season of the highest amateur class of the Rhineland Football Association under the name of 1. Amateurliga Rheinland. It was a predecessor of today's Rheinlandliga. It was the third season in which the league played with two game divisions, East and West. The Rhineland champion was determined through a game between the division champions.

The 1. Amateurliga was below II. Division Southwest until 1963 and therefore the third-class in the hierarchy. In the seasons 1956–57 to 1962–63 the league was played in two divisions (East and West). The two division champions played to determine the Rhineland champion. With the introduction of the regional league Southwest as second highest class, starting in the 1963–64 season, the Amateur league Rheinland was again combined into one division. Beginning in the 1974–75 season, the league played a role as a sub-team to the newly introduced 2. Bundesliga, where the Rhineland champion played in a relegation against the champion of the Verbandsliga Südwest and the Saarlandliga, for a position in the south divisions of the 2. Bundesliga. Starting from the 1978–79 season, the Oberliga Rheinland-Pfalz/Saar was introduced as the highest amateur class and this class was renamed to the "Verbandsliga Rheinland" and since then only fourth class.

== Results ==
Rheinland champion was the winner of the West Division, Germania Metternich, after a victory over the East Division champion SC Sinzig. The following the move up to the II. Division Southwest, Metternich unsuccessfully landed in last place and had to continue to play in the Amateurliga.

The amateurs of SpVgg Andernach, SG Betzdorf, SV Bendorf and SV Woppenrath had to move down to the 2. Amateur League.

For the following season 1959–60, promoted from the 2. Amateur League were:

- From the East division: SC Eitelborn
- From the West division: SV Ehrang, VfB Lützel and BSV Weißenthurm

VfL Trier came as relegated team down from the II. Division and played in the West Division in the following season.

SSV Heimbach-Weis and Eintracht Höhr-Grenzhausen switched from the West to the East Division after this season.

=== East Division ===
Rang	Verein	Spiele	Tore	Punkte
1.	SC Sinzig	24	58:34	36:12
2.	Sportfreunde Herdorf	24	70:36	35:13
3.	VfB Wissen	24	66:37	32:16
4.	VfL Neuwied (A)	24	74:49	28:20
5.	SC 07 Bad Neuenahr	24	44:37	28:20
6.	SC Wirges	24	49:49	23:25
7.	Adler Niederfischbach	24	29:40	21:23
8.	TuS Montabaur	24	40:50	20:28
9.	SSV Hönningen (N)	24	42:56	20:28
10.	TuS Diez (N)	24	49:67	20:28
11.	SV Neuwied	24	24:46	18:30
12.	SpVgg Andernach Amat.	24	32:51	17:31
13.	SG Betzdorf	24	48:73	14:34

=== West Division ===
Rang	Verein	Spiele	Tore	Punkte
1.	Germania Metternich (A)	24	91:24	38:8
2.	TuS Mayen (M)	24	69:36	37:11
3.	FC Urbar	24	86:39	34:14
4.	SSV Heimbach-Weis	24	62:48	29:19
5.	Rheinland Mayen	24	51:62	23:25
6.	Fortuna Saarburg	24	50:55	22:26
7.	SC Moselweiß	24	48:51	21:27
8.	Eintracht Höhr-Grenzhausen	24	52:62	18:28
9.	TuS Mosella Schweich	24	39:58	18:30
10.	FC Bitburg	24	45:75	18:30
11.	SV Trier-West (N)	24	48:86	18:30
12.	SV Bendorf	24	42:64	17:31
13.	SV Woppenrath (N)	24	59:82	17:31

	Division Champion
	Relegation to 2. Amateur League
(M)	Previous year's champions
(A)	Previous year's descendants from the 2nd Division
(N)	Previous year's climbers from the 2. Amateur League
