= 1962–63 Rheinlandliga =

1. Amateurliga Rheinland
- Season: 1962–63
- Champions: VfL Neuwied
- Relegated: SSV Bad Hönningen, SpVgg Neuwied, Eintracht Höhr-Grenzhausen, SV Niederbieber, Adler Niederfischbach, SC Eitelborn, TuS Montabaur, SC 07 Bad Neuenahr, FV Rübenach, VfB Lützel, TuS Saarburg, TuS Mosella Schweich, VfL Pünderich, SV Prüm

The 1962–63 Rheinlandliga was the 11th season of the highest amateur class of the Rhineland Football Association under the name of 1. Amateurliga Rheinland. It was a predecessor of today's Rheinlandliga. It was the seventh and final season in which the league played with two game divisions, East and West. The Rhineland champion was determined through a game between the division champions.

The 1. Amateurliga was below II. Division Southwest until 1963 and therefore the third-class in the hierarchy. In the seasons 1956–57 to 1962–63 the league was played in two divisions (East and West). The two division champions played to determine the Rhineland champion. With the introduction of the regional league Southwest as second highest class, starting in the 1963–64 season, the Amateur league Rheinland was again combined into one division. Beginning in the 1974–75 season, the league played a role as a sub-team to the newly introduced 2. Bundesliga, where the Rhineland champion played in a relegation against the champion of the Verbandsliga Südwest and the Saarlandliga, for a position in the south divisions of the 2. Bundesliga. Starting from the 1978–79 season, the Oberliga Rheinland-Pfalz/Saar was introduced as the highest amateur class and this class was renamed to the "Verbandsliga Rheinland" and since then only fourth class.

== Results ==
Rhineland champion was the winner of the East division, VfL Neuwied, after a victory over the West division champion, VfL Trier.

A relegation round was not played that year, since the former II Division was replaced to create the Regional League South.

The relegation for the second amateur league was therefore all teams from 7th place and lower from both divisions, because of the merge.

For the coming 1963/64 season, the descendant from the second amateur League was SSV Mülheim, as well as VfB Wissen, Germania Metternich and FV Engers from the II. Division.

=== East Division ===
Rank	Clubs	Games	Goals	Points
1.	VfL Neuwied	24	58:33	36:12
2.	Sportfreunde Herdorf	24	60:30	32:16
3.	SC Oberlahnstein	24	72:43	32:16
4.	SpVgg Bendorf	24	65:43	31:17
5.	SV Elkenroth	24	57:34	29:19
6.	SSV Heimbach-Weis	24	48:40	27:21
7.	SSV Bad Hönningen	24	48:50	25:23
8.	SpVgg Neuwied (N)	24	45:70	19:29
9.	Eintracht Höhr-Grenzhausen	24	61:70	18:30
10.	SV Niederbieber	24	46:73	18:30
11.	Adler Niederfischbach	24	43:57	17:31
12.	SC Eitelborn	24	39:55	17:31
13.	TuS Montabaur (N)	24	24:68	11:37

=== West Division ===
Rank	Clubs	Games	Goals	Points
1.	VfL Trier	24	50:29	35:13
2.	TuS Mayen	24	64:39	34:14
3.	BSV Weißenthurm (M)	24	67:47	29:19
4.	SC Sinzig	24	58:43	28:20
5.	SpVgg Andernach	24	55:49	27:21
6.	Alemannia Plaidt	24	58:50	26:22
7.	SC 07 Bad Neuenahr	24	54:48	24:24
8.	FV Rübenach	24	57:54	23:25
9.	VfB Lützel	24	47:59	23:25
10.	TuS Saarburg	24	49:56	19:29
11.	TuS Mosella Schweich	24	46:53	18:30
12.	VfL Pünderich (N)	24	34:70	15:33
13.	SV Prüm	24	31:73	11:37

	Division Champion
	Relegation to 2. Amateur League
(M)	Previous year's champions
(A)	Previous year's descendants from the 2nd Division
(N)	Previous year's climbers from the 2. Amateur League
