= 1956–57 Rheinlandliga =

1. Amateurliga Rheinland
- Season: 1956–57
- Champions: Germania Metternich
- Relegated: Sportfreunde Herdorf II, TuS Diez (East Division), TuS Konz, SV Trier-West (West Division)

The 1956–57 Rheinlandliga was the fifth season of the highest amateur class of the Rhineland Football Association under the name of 1. Amateurliga Rheinland. It was a predecessor of today's Rheinlandliga. It was the first season in which the league played with two game divisions, East and West. The Rhineland champion was determined through a game between the division champions.

The 1. Amateurliga was below II. Division Southwest until 1963 and therefore the third-class in the hierarchy. In the seasons 1956–57 to 1962–63 the league was played in two divisions (East and West). The two division champions played to determine the Rhineland champion. With the introduction of the regional league Southwest as second highest class, starting in the 1963–64 season, the Amateur league Rheinland was again combined into one division. Beginning in the 1974–75 season, the league played a role as a sub-team to the newly introduced 2. Bundesliga, where the Rhineland champion played in a relegation against the champion of the Verbandsliga Südwest and the Saarlandliga, for a position in the south divisions of the 2. Bundesliga. Starting from the 1978–79 season, the Oberliga Rheinland-Pfalz/Saar was introduced as the highest amateur class and this class was renamed to the "Verbandsliga Rheinland" and since then only fourth class.

== Results ==
Rhineland champion was Germania Metternich through the victory against West division champion FC Bitburg. Subsequently, Germania Metternich managed a second place in the relegations rounds and moved up to the II. Division Southwest. TuS Diez, Sportsfreunde Herdorf II, SV Trier-West and TuS Konz had to descend, after this season, into the 2. Amateur League.

For the following 1957–58 season, teams that moved up from the 2. Amateur League:

- From the West Division: TuS Mosella Schweich
- From the East Division: SSV Heimbach-Weis, VfB Wissen

For the following 1957–58 season, Sportsfreunde Herdorf came down from the II.Division into the East division.

SC Moselweiß switched to the West division after the season.

== East Division ==
Rank	Club	Matches	Goals	Points
1.	Germania Metternich (N)	22	76:38	34:10
2.	SG Betzdorf (N)	22	69:44	32:12
3.	SpVgg Bendorf	22	58:37	32:12
4.	VfL Bad Ems	22	80:63	25:19
5.	Adler Fischbach	22	51:57	23:21
6.	SC Wirges	22	69:53	22:22
7.	SC Moselweiß (N)	22	44:55	20:24
8.	TuS Montabaur	22	39:44	18:26
9.	Eintracht Höhr-Grenzhausen	22	41:58	18:26
10.	SC Eitelborn (N)	22	38:54	17:27
11.	TuS Diez (N)	22	36:50	16:28
12.	Sportfreunde Herdorf II (N)	22	36:74	7:37

== West Division ==
Rank	Club	Matches	Goals	Points
1.	FC Bitburg (N)	22	55:50	30:14
2.	TuS Mayen (N)	22	71:41	29:15
3.	SC 07 Bad Neuenahr	22	43:30	28:16
4.	Fortuna Saarburg (N)	22	53:42	27:17
5.	SpVgg Andernach (A)	22	81:43	25:19
6.	Rheinland Mayen	22	59:51	25:19
7.	SC Sinzig	22	57:49	25:19
8.	SV Ehrang	22	62:53	23:21
9.	Fortuna Kottenheim (N)	22	45:51	16:28
10.	SV Neuwied	22	38:53	15:29
11.	SV Trier-West (N)	22	40:61	15:29
12.	TuS Konz	22	28:111	6:38

	Amateur League Champion Southwest
	Relegation to 2. Amateur League
(M)	Previous year's champions
(A)	Previous year's descendants from the 2nd Division
(N)	Previous year's climbers from the 2. Amateur League
