= 1954–55 Rheinlandliga =

1. Amateurliga Rheinland
- Season: 1954–55
- Champions: VfL Trier
- Relegated: SV Wittlich, FC Urbar, VfB Lützel

The 1954–55 Rheinlandliga was the third season of the highest amateur class of the Rhineland Football Association under the name of 1. Amateurliga Rheinland. It was a predecessor of today's Rheinlandliga.

The 1. Amateurliga was below II. Division Southwest until 1963 and therefore the third-class in the hierarchy. In the seasons 1956–57 to 1962–63 the league was played in two divisions (East and West). The two division champions played to determine the Rhineland champion. With the introduction of the regional league Southwest as second highest class, starting in the 1963–64 season, the Amateur league Rheinland was again combined into one division. Beginning in the 1974–75 season, the league played a role as a sub-team to the newly introduced 2. Bundesliga, where the Rhineland champion played in a relegation against the champion of the Verbandsliga Südwest and the Saarlandliga, for a position in the south divisions of the 2. Bundesliga. Starting from the 1978–79 season, the Oberliga Rheinland-Pfalz/Saar was introduced as the highest amateur class and this class was renamed to the "Verbandsliga Rheinland" and since then only fourth class.

== Results ==
Rhineland champion was, as in the previous season, VfL Trier, which this time won the relegation round for the II. Division southwest and moved up. Runner up, SV Niederlahnstein, participated as a Rhineland representative in the German Football Amateur Championship in 1955 and failed in the group stage. VfB Lützel, FC Urbar and SV Wittlich had to move down to the 2. amateur league after this season. For the following season, 1955–56, SG Andernach, SV Niederfischbach, TuS Konz and VfL Bad Ems moved up from the 2. Amateur league, as well as the descendant from the II. Division, SC 07 Bad Neuenahr.

Rank	Club	Matches	Goals	Points
1.	VfL Trier (M)	28	58:42	46:10
2.	SV Niederlahnstein	28	77:32	43:13
3.	SpVgg Bendorf	28	88:42	39:17
4.	Eintracht Höhr (N)	28	69:59	30:26
5.	SpVgg Neuwied	28	53:58	30:26
6.	Grün-Weiß Vallendar	28	65:62	28:28
7.	SC Sinzig (N)	28	73:71	27:29
8.	TuS Montabaur	28	56:57	26:30
9.	Sportfreunde Daaden (N)	28	68:74	26:30
10.	SV Ehrang	28	47:58	26:30
11.	SV Trier-West (N)	28	55:59	25:31
12.	SC Wirges	28	52:63	25:31
13.	VfB Lützel	28	50:64	22:34
14.	FC Urbar	28	36:70	21:35
15.	SV Wittlich	28	25:96	6:50

	Amateur League Champion Southwest
	Relegation to 2. Amateur League
(M)	Previous year's champions
(A)	Previous year's descendants from the 2nd Division
(N)	Previous year's climbers from the 2. Amateur League
