= 1952–53 Rheinlandliga =

1. Amateurliga Rheinland
- Season: 1952–53
- Champions: SpVgg Bendorf
- Relegated: SV Remagen, TuS Mayen, SV Trier-West, SG 06 Betzdorf

The 1952–53 Rheinlandliga was the first season of the highest amateur class of the Rhineland Football Association under the name of 1. Amateurliga Rheinland. It replaced the multi-tracked Landesliga Rheinland as the highest amateur class and was a predecessor of today's Rheinlandliga.

The 1. Amateurliga was below II. Division Southwest until 1963 and therefore the third-class in the hierarchy. In the seasons 1956–57 to 1962-63 the league was played in two divisions (East and West). The two division champions played to determine the Rhineland champion. With the introduction of the regional league Southwest as second highest class, starting in the 1963–64 season, the Amateur league Rheinland was again combined into one division. Beginning in the 1974–75 season, the league played a role as a sub-team to the newly introduced 2. Bundesliga, where the Rhineland champion played in a relegation against the champion of the Verbandsliga Südwest and the Saarlandliga, for a position in the south divisions of the 2. Bundesliga. Starting from the 1978–79 season, the Oberliga Rheinland-Pfalz/Saar was introduced as the highest amateur class and this class was renamed to the "Verbandsliga Rheinland" and since then only fourth class.

== Results ==
Rhineland champion was SpVgg Bendorf. In the relegation rounds to move up to the 2. league Southwest, Bensdorf finished in last place had to remain in the league. FC Urbar participated as a Rhineland representative in the German Soccer Amateur Championship in 1953, but did not go beyond the group stage.

SV Remagen, TuS Mayen, SV Trier-West and SG Betzdorf had to move down into the 2. Amateur League after this season. For the following season, 1953–54, Grün-Weiß Vallendar, SV Wittlich, TuS Montabaur and VfL Brohl moved up from the 2. Amateur league

Germania Mudersbach switched to the Landesliga Westfalen after that season.

| Rank | Club | Matches | Goals | Points |
|---|---|---|---|---|
| 1. | SpVgg Bendorf | 30 | 76:32 | 44:16 |
| 2. | FC Urbar | 30 | 77:41 | 39:21 |
| 3. | VfL Trier | 30 | 81:62 | 38:22 |
| 4. | SpVgg Neuwied | 30 | 77:57 | 37:23 |
| 5. | SC Wirges | 30 | 80:57 | 35:25 |
| 6. | SV Niederlahnstein | 30 | 52:44 | 34:26 |
| 7. | SV Ehrang | 30 | 73:59 | 33:27 |
| 8. | Germania Mudersbach | 30 | 76:58 | 31:29 |
| 9. | TuS Konz (A) | 30 | 68:68 | 27:33 |
| 10. | SSV Heimbach-Weis | 30 | 55:57 | 26:34 |
| 11. | SpVgg Zewen | 30 | 54:73 | 26:34 |
| 12. | VfB Lützel (A) | 30 | 49:73 | 24:36 |
| 13. | SV Remagen | 30 | 47:73 | 23:37 |
| 14. | TuS Mayen | 30 | 47:81 | 22:38 |
| 15. | SV Trier-West | 30 | 51:89 | 22:38 |
| 16. | SG 06 Betzdorf | 30 | 52:91 | 19:41 |

| Champion of Rheinlandliga |
| Relegation to 2. Amateurliga |
