= 1959–60 Rheinlandliga =

1. Amateurliga Rheinland
- Season: 1959–60
- Champions: Germania Metternich
- Relegated: TuS Montabaur, SC Wirges, SC Moselwei0, FC Bitburg

The 1959–60 Rheinlandliga was the eighth season of the highest amateur class of the Rhineland Football Association under the name of 1. Amateurliga Rheinland. It was a predecessor of today's Rheinlandliga. It was the fourth season in which the league played with two game divisions, East and West. The Rhineland champion was determined through a game between the division champions.

The 1. Amateurliga was below II. Division Southwest until 1963 and therefore the third-class in the hierarchy. In the seasons 1956–57 to 1962–63 the league was played in two divisions (East and West). The two division champions played to determine the Rhineland champion. With the introduction of the regional league Southwest as second highest class, starting in the 1963–64 season, the Amateur league Rheinland was again combined into one division. Beginning in the 1974–75 season, the league played a role as a sub-team to the newly introduced 2. Bundesliga, where the Rhineland champion played in a relegation against the champion of the Verbandsliga Südwest and the Saarlandliga, for a position in the south divisions of the 2. Bundesliga. Starting from the 1978–79 season, the Oberliga Rheinland-Pfalz/Saar was introduced as the highest amateur class and this class was renamed to the "Verbandsliga Rheinland" and since then only fourth class.

== Results ==
Rhineland champion was the winner of the West Division, Germania Metternich, after a victory over East division champion, Sportsfreunde Herdorf. The following move up to the II. Division Southwest, Metternich successfully managed to place second, which was sufficient for the promotion.

TuS Montabaur, SC Wirges, SC Moselweiß and FC Bitburg had to move down to the 2. Amateur League.

For the following season 1960–61, promoted from the 2. Amateur league were:

- From the East division: SV Elkenroth
- From the West division: SV Prüm, SC Oberlahnstein, Alemannia Plaidt

=== East Division ===
Rang	Verein	Spiele	Tore	Punkte
1.	Sportfreunde Herdorf	26	62:34	34:18
2.	VfL Neuwied	26	63:43	33:19
3.	SC 07 Bad Neuenahr	26	56:41	33:19
4.	SC Sinzig (M)	26	57:33	31:21
5.	VfB Wissen	26	54:36	29:23
6.	TuS Diez	26	48:52	29:23
7.	SSV Heimbach-Weis	26	70:58	27:25
8.	SC Eitelborn (N)	26	44:55	25:27
9.	SSV Bad Hönningen	26	50:63	23:29
10.	Adler Niederfischbach	26	43:54	22:30
11.	Eintracht Höhr-Grenzhausen	26	50:62	22:30
12.	SpVgg Neuwied	26	34:50	21:31
13.	TuS Montabaur	26	44:61	20:32
14.	SC Wirges	26	32:67	15:37

=== West Division ===
Rang	Verein	Spiele	Tore	Punkte
1.	Germania Metternich (M)	24	86:29	38:10
2.	BSV Weißenthurm (N)	24	61:50	30:18
3.	TuS Mosella Schweich	24	56:49	27:21
4.	TuS Mayen	24	46:51	26:22
5.	FC Urbar	24	44:54	25:23
6.	VfB Lützel (N)	24	52:52	24:24
7.	VfL Trier (A)	24	52:54	24:24
8.	SV Ehrang (N)	24	50:40	23:25
9.	TuS Saarburg	24	49:46	23:25
10.	Rheinland Mayen	24	40:56	23:25
11.	SV Trier-West	24	55:64	21:27
12.	SC Moselweiß	24	47:45	20:28
13.	FC Bitburg	24	28:76	8:40

	Division Champion
	Relegation to 2. Amateur League
(M)	Previous year's champions
(A)	Previous year's descendants from the 2nd Division
(N)	Previous year's climbers from the 2. Amateur League
