= 1960–61 Rheinlandliga =

1. Amateurliga Rheinland
- Season: 1960–61
- Champions: SV Ehrang
- Relegated: TuS Diez, SpVgg Neuwied, SV Trier–West, Rheinland Mayen

The 1960–61 Rheinlandliga was the ninth season of the highest amateur class of the Rhineland Football Association under the name of 1. Amateurliga Rheinland. It was a predecessor of today's Rheinlandliga. It was the fifth season in which the league played with two game divisions, East and West. The Rhineland champion was determined through a game between the division champions.

The 1. Amateurliga was below II. Division Southwest until 1963 and therefore the third–class in the hierarchy. In the seasons 1956–57 to 1962–63 the league was played in two divisions (East and West). The two division champions played to determine the Rhineland champion. With the introduction of the regional league Southwest as second highest class, starting in the 1963–64 season, the Amateur league Rheinland was again combined into one division. Beginning in the 1974–75 season, the league played a role as a sub–team to the newly introduced 2. Bundesliga, where the Rhineland champion played in a relegation against the champion of the Verbandsliga Südwest and the Saarlandliga, for a position in the south divisions of the 2. Bundesliga. Starting from the 1978–79 season, the Oberliga Rheinland-Pfalz/Saar was introduced as the highest amateur class and this class was renamed to the "Verbandsliga Rheinland" and since then only fourth class.

== Results ==
Rhineland champion was the winner of the West Division, SV Ehrang, after a victory over the East Division champion, VfB Wissen. The following move up to the II. Division Southwest ended with last place and the team had to remain in the Rheinlandliga.

TuS Diez, SpVgg Neuwied, SV Trier–West and Rheinland Mayen had to move down to the 2. Amateur league.

For the following season 1961−62, promoted from the 2. Amateur league were:

- From the East division: SV Niederbieber, SG Altenkirchen
- From theWest division: SV Leiwen, FV Rübenach

SC 07 Bad Neuenahr and SC Sinzig joined the West division in the next season.

SC Oberlahnstein and FC Urbar moved to the East division in the next season.

=== East Division ===
Rang	Verein	Spiele	Tore	Punkte
1.	VfB Wissen	24	79:37	37:11
2.	Sportfreunde Herdorf (M)	24	56:38	32:16
3.	SC Sinzig	24	53:40	32:16
4.	SC Eitelborn	24	62:57	25:23
5.	Eintracht Höhr-Grenzhausen	24	48:52	25:23
6.	SSV Bad Hönningen	24	51:51	23:25
7.	Adler Niederfischbach	24	48:57	22:26
8.	SSV Heimbach-Weis	24	40:43	22:26
9.	VfL Neuwied	24	42:46	21:27
10.	SV Elkenroth (N)	24	45:57	21:27
11.	SC 07 Bad Neuenahr	24	44:57	21:27
12.	TuS Diez	24	46:53	19:29
13.	SpVgg Neuwied	24	32:59	12:36

=== West Division ===
Rang	Verein	Spiele	Tore	Punkte
1.	SV Ehrang	24	65:36	32:16
2.	FC Urbar	24	63:43	32:16
3.	Alemannia Plaidt (N)	24	65 :45	29 :19
4.	TuS Mayen	24	62 :47	28 :20
5.	BSV Weißenthurm	24	54 :43	28 :20
6.	TuS Mosella Schweich	24	38:33	26:22
7.	VfB Lützel	24	45:44	25:23
8.	SC Oberlahnstein (N)	24	57:54	24:24
9.	VfL Trier	24	41:43	22:26
10.	TuS Saarburg	24	43:56	22:26
11.	SV Prüm (N)	24	66:72	20:28
12.	SV Trier-West	24	50:73	17:31
13.	Rheinland Mayen	24	24:86	7:41

	Division Champion
	Relegation to 2. Amateur League
(M)	Previous year's champions
(A)	Previous year's descendants from the 2nd Division
(N)	Previous year's climbers from the 2. Amateur League
