= 1953–54 Rheinlandliga =

1. Amateurliga Rheinland
- Season: 1953–54
- Champions: VfL Trier
- Relegated: SSV Heimbach-Weis, TuS Konz, SpVgg Zewen, VfL Brohl

The 1953–54 Rheinlandliga was the second season of the highest amateur class of the Rhineland Football Association under the name of 1. Amateurliga Rheinland. It was a predecessor of today's Rheinlandliga.

The 1. Amateurliga was below II. Division Southwest until 1963 and therefore the third-class in the hierarchy. In the seasons 1956–57 to 1962–63 the league was played in two divisions (East and West). The two division champions played to determine the Rhineland champion. With the introduction of the regional league Southwest as second highest class, starting in the 1963–64 season, the Amateur league Rheinland was again combined into one division. Beginning in the 1974–75 season, the league played a role as a sub-team to the newly introduced 2. Bundesliga, where the Rhineland champion played in a relegation against the champion of the Verbandsliga Südwest and the Saarlandliga, for a position in the south divisions of the 2. Bundesliga. Starting from the 1978–79 season, the Oberliga Rheinland-Pfalz/Saar was introduced as the highest amateur class and this class was renamed to the "Verbandsliga Rheinland" and since then only fourth class.

== Results ==
Rhineland champion was VfL Trier. In the relegation rounds to 2nd Division Southwest, Trier took third place and had to remain in the amateur league. Runner up, FC Urbar, took part in the German Football Amateur Championship in 1954 as a Rhineland representative, but failed again in the group stage. SSV Heimbach-Weis, TuS Konz, SpVgg Zewenr and VfL Brohl had to move down into the 2. amateur league after this season. For the following season, 1954–55, Eintracht Höhr, SC Sinzig, Sportfreunde Daaden and SV Trier-West moved up from the 2. Amateur League.

Rank	Club	Matches	Goals	Points
1.	VfL Trier	28	76:47	36:20
2.	FC Urbar	28	70:44	35:21
3.	SpVgg Bendorf (M)	28	65:40	35:21
4.	Grün-Weiß Vallendar (N)	28	63:41	35:21
5.	SC Wirges	28	73:53	30:26
6.	TuS Montabaur (N)	28	45:45	29:27
7.	SV Ehrang	28	48:53	29:27
8.	SpVgg Neuwied	28	60:60	27:29
9.	SV Wittlich (N)	28	61:65	26:30
10.	VfB Lützel	28	55:68	26:30
11.	SV Niederlahnstein	28	55:59	25:31
12.	SSV Heimbach-Weis	28	57:75	24:32
13.	TuS Konz	28	47:64	24:32
14.	SpVgg Zewen	28	54:79	20:36
15.	VfL Brohl (N)	28	50:86	19:37

	Amateur League Champion Southwest
	Relegation to 2. Amateur League
(M)	Previous year's champions
(A)	Previous year's descendants from the 2nd Division
(N)	Previous year's climbers from the 2. Amateur League
