= Rheinlandliga =

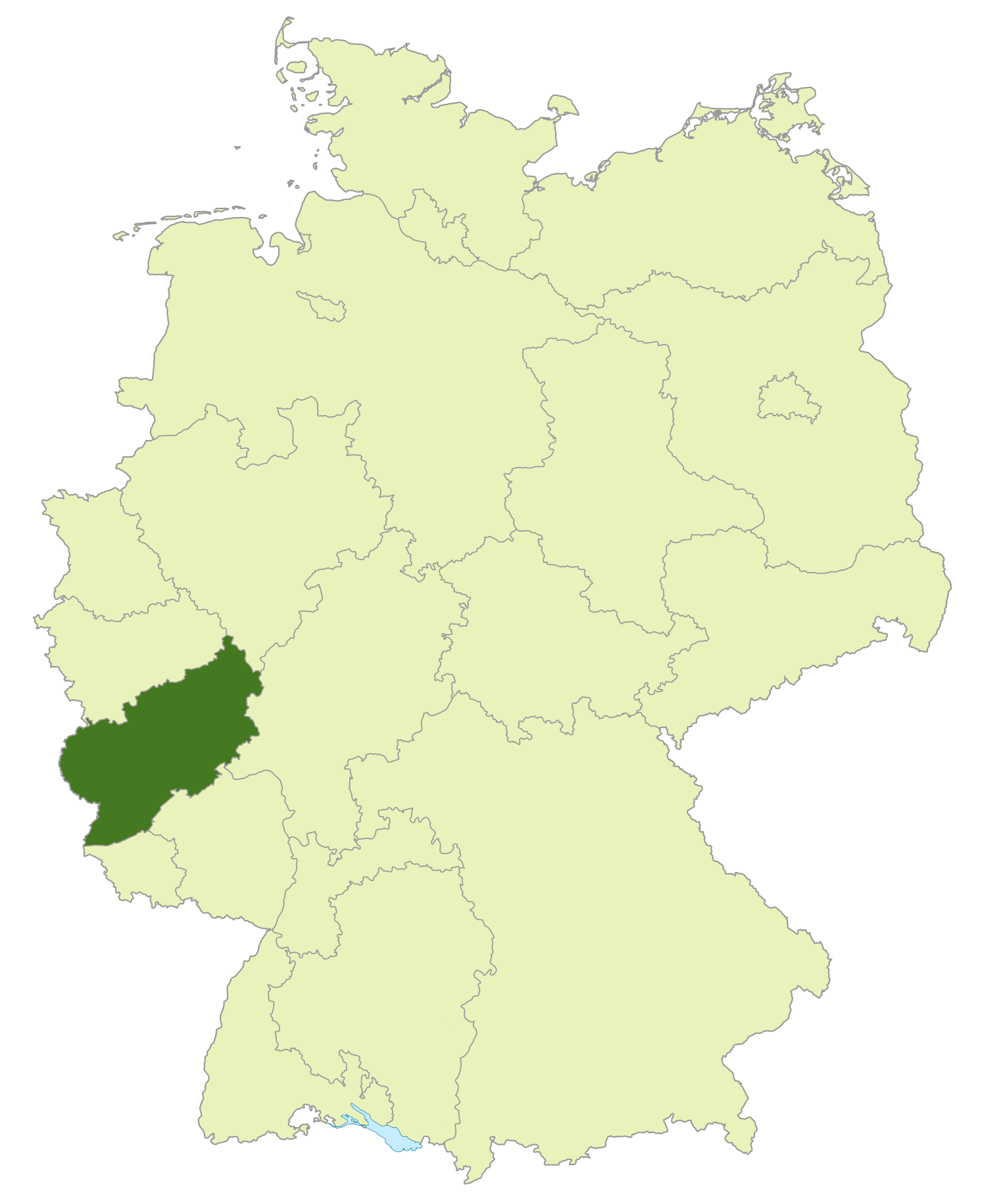
- Organising body: Rhineland Football Association
- Founded: 1952
- Country: Germany
- State: Rhineland-Palatinate
- Region: Rheinland
- Number of clubs: 18
- Level on pyramid: Level 6
- Promotion to: Oberliga Rheinland-Pfalz/Saar
- Relegation to: Bezirksliga Rheinland-Mitte; Bezirksliga Rheinland-Ost; Bezirksliga Rheinland-West
- Domestic cup(s): Rhineland Cup
- Current champions: Ahrweiler BC (2021–22)

The Rheinlandliga is a German amateur football division administered by the Rhineland Football Association, one of the 21 German state football associations. Being the top flight of the Rhineland state association, the Verbandsliga is currently a level 6 division of the German football league system.

== Overview ==
The Amateurliga Rheinland was formed in 1952 in the northern half of the state of Rhineland-Palatinate. Before its inception, three separate leagues operated in the area as the highest level of play. The league was a feeder league to the 2nd Oberliga Südwest. From 1952 until the establishment of the Oberliga Südwest in 1978, it was the third tier of the football league system.

The winner of the Amateurliga Rheinland was not automatically promoted to its superior league but rather had to take part in a promotion play-off. The champion would have to compete with the winners of the Amateurligen Saarland and Südwest.

Until 1933, the region covered by the Rhinrland FA was politically part of the now dissolved German state of Prussia. It was part of the Prussian Rhine Province.

The league was established in 1952 with sixteen teams, the winner gaining promotion to the 2nd Oberliga Südwest. The founder members were:

- SpVgg Bendorf
- FC Urbar
- VfL Trier
- SpVgg Neuwied
- SC Wirges
- SV Niederlahnstein
- SV Ehrang
- Germania Mudersbach
- TuS Konz
- SSV Heimbach-Weis
- SpVgg Zewen
- VfB Lützel
- SV Remagen
- TuS Mayen
- SV Trier-West
- SG Betzdorf

In 1956 the league was split into a western and an eastern group with twelve teams each. In 1963 it reverted to its old single group setup.

With the introduction of the Bundesliga in 1963 the Amateurliga was placed below the new Regionalliga Südwest but still retained its third-tier status. It continued to do so after the introduction of the 2nd Bundesliga Süd in 1974.

SC Bad Neuenahr and SC Sinzig hold the record for years in the Amateurliga, each with 22 out of a possible 26.

In 1978, the league was renamed Verbandsliga Rheinland. At the same time, the Oberliga Südwest was reintroduced. The top five teams out of the Amateurliga went to the new Oberliga while the teams from place 6 to 15 found themselves in the Verbandsliga. The bottom team was relegated. The Verbandsliga was now the fourth tier of the league system.

The winner of the Rheinlandliga, like the winners of the Verbandsliga Südwest and the Saarlandliga gains direct promotion to the Oberliga Rheinland-Pfalz/Saar, formerly the Oberliga Südwest. The runners-up will only get a chance for promotion when there is additional spots to fill in the Oberliga, like 1994 when the Regionalligas were introduced and SpVgg EGC Wirges and the SG Betzdorf were promoted.

In the Rheinland, the Verbandsliga is called Rheinlandliga.

The Rheinland contains an unproportional amount of SG's, which are joint teams without the contributing clubs actually merging. The reason for this is the relatively low population density and therefore a lack of players. SG's can usually not be promoted above their Verbandsliga.

Feeder Leagues to the Rheinlandliga

- Bezirksliga Rheinland-Mitte
- Bezirksliga Rheinland-Ost
- Bezirksliga Rheinland-West

Until 2003, two Landesligas, north and south, existed in the region, set between Verbandsliga and Bezirksliga. Those leagues were disbanded in 2003.

== League champions ==
The league champions:

Season	Club
1952–53	**SpVgg Bendorf**
1953–54	VfL Trier
1954–55	**VfL Trier**
1955–56	**SV Niederlahnstein**
1956–57	**Germania Metternich**
1957–58	Spfr. Herdorf
1958–59	Germania Metternich
1959–60	**Germania Metternich**
1960–61	SV Ehrang
1961–62	**VfB Wissen**
1962–63	VfL Neuwied
1963–64	**Germania Metternich**
1964–65	SpVgg Bendorf
1965–66	**Germania Metternich**
1966–67	**SSV Mülheim**
1967–68	SC Sinzig
1968–69	SSV Mülheim
1969–70	VfL Neuwied
1970–71	**SpVgg Andernach**
1971–72	**Eisbachtaler SF**
1972–73	SpVgg Andernach
1973–74	SV Leiwen
1974–75	Eintracht Trier
1975–76	**Eintracht Trier**

Season	Club
1976–77	TuS Neuendorf
1977–78	TuS Neuendorf
1978–79	**SV Leiwen**
1979–80	**TuS Mayen**
1980–81	**SV Leiwen**
1981–82	**VfL Hamm/Sieg**
1982–83	**SpVgg EGC Wirges**
1983–84	**TuS Mayen**
1984–85	**VfL Hamm/Sieg**
1985–86	**SV Leiwen**
1986–87	**SpVgg EGC Wirges**
1987–88	**VfB Wissen**
1988–89	**TuS Mayen**
1989–90	**Eisbachtaler SF**
1990–91	**VfB Wissen**
1991–92	**SV Wittlich**
1992–93	**SV Prüm**
1993–94	**TuS Koblenz**
1994–95	**VfL Trier**
1995–96	**SV Prüm**
1996–97	**TuS Montabaur**
1997–98	**SpVgg EGC Wirges**
1998–99	**TuS Mayen**

Season	Club
1999–2000	**Germania Metternich**
2000–01	**TuS Mayen**
2001–02	**FV Engers 07**
2002–03	**SV Klausen**
2003–04	**SG Betzdorf**
2004–05	**Eintracht Trier**
2005–06	SG Rossbach–Verscheid
2006–07	**SV Rossbach-Verscheid**
2007–08	**SG Betzdorf**
2008–09	**Eisbachtaler SF**
2009–10	**Eintracht Trier**
2010–11	**FSV Salmrohr**
2011–12	**SV Mehring**
2012–13	**SpVgg Burgbrohl**
2013–14	**SpVgg EGC Wirges**
2014–15	**FC Karbach**
2015–16	**TuS Rot-Weiss Koblenz**
2016–17	**FV Engers 07**
2017–18	**TSV Emmelshausen**
2018–19	**Eisbachtaler SF**
2019–20	**SG 2000 Mülheim-Karlich**
2020–21	Season curtailed and annulled
2021–22	**Ahrweiler BC**

Source: "Verbandsliga Rheinland". Das deutsche Fussball-Archiv.

- **bold** denotes club gained promotion.
- In 1994 SpVgg EGC Wirges and SG Betzdorf were also promoted.
- SG Betzdorf was again promoted as runner–up in 1998.
- In 2006 FSV Salmrohr was promoted instead of the first placed SG Rossbach–Verscheid. The reason for this is the fact that a conglomerate of clubs, usually called SG (Spielgemeinschaft), can be refused promotion by their Verband. Rossbach–Verscheid were two separate clubs fielding a joint team, not a merger of two clubs. In 2007, promotion was granted as the club was now an SV (Sportverein).
- In 2015 runner–up SV Mehring was also promoted after play–offs.
- In 2020 runners-up TSV Emmelshausen and FSV Salmrohr were also promoted.
- In 2022 runner-up TuS Kirchberg was also promoted after play-offs.
