= 2020–21 Verbandspokal =

Tournament details
- Country: Germany
- Teams: 44

The 2020–21 Verbandspokal (English: 2020–21 Association Cup) consisted of twenty-one regional cup competitions, the Verbandspokale, the qualifying competition for the 2021–22 DFB-Pokal, the German Cup.

All clubs from the 3. Liga and below could enter the regional Verbandspokale, subject to the rules and regulations of each region. Clubs from the Bundesliga and 2. Bundesliga could not enter but were instead directly qualified for the first round of the DFB-Pokal. Reserve teams were not permitted to take part in the DFB-Pokal or the Verbandspokale. The precise rules of each regional Verbandspokal are laid down by the regional football association organising it.

All twenty-one winners qualified for the first round of the German Cup in the following season. Three additional clubs also qualified for the first round of the German Cup, these being from the three largest state associations, Bavaria, Westphalia and Lower Saxony. The Lower Saxony Cup was split into two paths, one for teams from the 3. Liga and the Regionalliga Nord and one for the teams from lower leagues. The winners of both paths qualified for the DFB-Pokal. In Bavaria the winners of the Bavarian Regional League Cup qualified for the DFB-Pokal while in Westphalia the best-placed Westphalian Regionalliga West team qualified.

The finals of the Verbandspokal competitions were scheduled to be played on the Amateurs' Final Day (German: Finaltag der Amateure), which was scheduled for 29 May 2021.

By the end of April 2021, a large number of state and regional associations had already cancelled or even annulled their league seasons from the Regionalliga downwards due to the COVID-19 pandemic in Germany. As a result, in several association cup competitions, the final rounds had not even been reached or only the first rounds had been played. Further handling was therefore up to each individual association, which should ultimately determine two finalists or a participant in the DFB-Pokal.

== Competitions ==
The finals of the 2020–21 Verbandspokal competitions (winners listed in bold):

Cup	Date	Location	Team 1	Result	Team 2	Attendance	Report
Baden Cup (Note: On 3 May 2021, the Baden Football Association decided to cancel the semi-finals and remove the remaining amateur teams from the competition, leaving Waldhof Mannheim and Astoria Walldorf to compete in the final.) (2020–21 season)	29 May 2021	Pforzheim	**Waldhof Mannheim**	2–1	Astoria Walldorf		Report
Bavarian Cup (Note: As one of the three largest regional associations, Bavaria gets an additional DFB-Pokal berth, which goes to the winners of the Bavarian Regional League Cup.) (2020–21 season (regular competition)) (2020–21 season (final rounds))	27 June 2021	Illertissen	FV Illertissen	0–0 (7–8 p)	**Türkgücü München**	500	Report
Berlin Cup (2020–21 season (regular competition)) (2020–21 season (final rounds))	29 May 2021	Berlin	**BFC Dynamo**	2–1	Berliner AK		Report
Brandenburg Cup (2020–21 season)	29 May 2021	Luckenwalde	Union Fürstenwalde	0–2	**SV Babelsberg**		Report
Bremen Cup (2020–21 season)	30 June 2021	Bremen	Brinkumer SV	1–2	**Bremer SV**		Report
Hamburg Cup (Note: The Hamburg Cup was abandoned on 25 May 2021. The highest-ranked team from Hamburg was supposed to be awarded the DFB-Pokal berth; however, the 2020–21 Regionalliga Nord season was annulled, which meant that Eintracht Norderstedt, Teutonia Ottensen and Altona 93 were equally ranked. Since Altona 93 declined to participate in a play-off, only a single play-off match was held between Eintracht Norderstedt and Teutonia Ottensen.) (2020–21 season)	26 June 2021	Norderstedt	**Eintracht Norderstedt**	1–0	Teutonia Ottensen		Report
Hessian Cup (2020–21 season)	29 May 2021	Haiger	TSV Steinbach Haiger	0–3	**Wehen Wiesbaden**		Report
Lower Rhine Cup (2020–21 season (regular competition)) (2020–21 season (final rounds))	29 May 2021	Duisburg	**Wuppertaler SV**	2–1	SV Straelen		Report
Lower Saxony Cup (Note: As one of the three largest regional associations, Lower Saxony gets an additional DFB-Pokal berth, which goes to the winner of the second cup path.) (2020–21 season (3. Liga / Regionalliga)) (2020–21 season (amateurs))	29 May 2021	Hanover	SV Drochtersen/Assel	2–2 (3–4 p)	**SV Meppen**	150	Report
Lower Saxony Cup (2020–21 season (3. Liga / Regionalliga)) (2020–21 season (amateurs))	Abandoned (Note: The amateurs' path of the Lower Saxony Cup was abandoned on 19 May 2021. VfL Oldenburg was awarded the DFB-Pokal berth after a draw between the remaining participants.)						
Mecklenburg-Vorpommern Cup (2020–21 season)	Abandoned (Note: The Mecklenburg-Vorpommern Cup was abandoned on 20 May 2021. Greifswalder FC was awarded the DFB-Pokal berth.)						
Middle Rhine Cup (2020–21 season)	29 May 2021	Bonn	**Viktoria Köln**	2–0	Alemannia Aachen	250	Report
Rhineland Cup (Note: On 4 May 2021, the Rhineland Football Association announced that, since the cup season could not be completed until 30 June, a qualification match for the DFB-Pokal spot would be played between the top-ranked remaining team, Rot-Weiß Koblenz, and another team decided by draw between the remaining teams that are allowed and willing to participate in the match. The result of the draw was that Koblenz's opponent would be VfB Linz. The remainder of the cup season was to be completed by August, originally 24 July; however, the winner would not qualify for the DFB-Pokal.) (2020–21 season (regular competition)) (2020–21 season (final rounds))	29 May 2021	Koblenz	**Rot-Weiß Koblenz**	6–1	VfB Linz	100	Report
Rhineland Cup (2020–21 season (regular competition)) (2020–21 season (final rounds))	15 September 2021	Koblenz	**Rot-Weiß Koblenz**	3–0	Hunsrückhöhe Morbach	312	Report
Saarland Cup (Note: On 21 April 2021, the Saarland Football Association has decided to cancel the remaining regularly scheduled cup matches and have SV Elversberg, FC 08 Homburg and 1. FC Saarbrücken play for the title. In a draw, SV Elversberg was given a bye to the final while Homburg and Saarbrücken played a semi-final match to decide the second finalist.) (2020–21 season (regular competition)) (2020–21 season (final rounds))	29 May 2021	Spiesen-Elversberg	**SV Elversberg**	1–0	1. FC Saarbrücken		Report
Saxony Cup (2020–21 season)	29 May 2021	Leipzig	**Lokomotive Leipzig**	1–0 (a.e.t.)	Chemnitzer FC		Report
Saxony-Anhalt Cup (Note: On 24 April 2021, the Saxony-Anhalt Cup was paused and would be continued in 2021–22 starting with the round of 16. The 3. Liga teams Hallescher FC and 1. FC Magdeburg played a "qualification match" to determine the DFB-Pokal participant. On 28 May 2021, this decision was overturned by the association court. The dispute was settled on 23 June 2021, allowing Magdeburg to participate in the DFB-Pokal.) (2020–21 season)	29 May 2021	Halberstadt	Hallescher FC	2–3	**1. FC Magdeburg**		Report
Schleswig-Holstein Cup (2020–21 season)	27 June 2021	Malente	Phönix Lübeck	1–2 (a.e.t.)	**Weiche Flensburg**	250	Report
South Baden Cup (2020–21 season)	27 June 2021	Bahlingen	**FC 08 Villingen**	5–1	Freiburger FC		Report
Southwestern Cup (2020–21 season)	Abandoned (Note: The Southwestern Cup was abandoned on 14 June 2021. 1. FC Kaiserslautern was awarded the DFB-Pokal berth.)						
Thuringian Cup (Note: On 19 April 2021, the football season in Thuringia was abandoned and annulled. The Thuringian Football Association (TFV) originally decided that the cup final is to be played between the only two remaining teams that were allowed to train at that moment, Carl Zeiss Jena and ZFC Meuselwitz. However, on 4 May 2021, this decision was overturned by the TFV sports court. It was then decided to finish the season with 16 teams until 30 June 2021.) (2020–21 season)	30 June 2021	Meuselwitz	**Carl Zeiss Jena**	4–1 (a.e.t.)	FC An der Fahner Höhe	1,005	Report
Westphalian Cup (Note: As one of the three largest regional associations, Westphalia gets an additional DFB-Pokal berth, which goes to the best-placed Westphalian team of the Regionalliga West.) (2020–21 season (regular competition)) (2020–21 season (final rounds))	29 May 2021	Verl	Sportfreunde Lotte	0–1	**Preußen Münster**		Report
Württemberg Cup (Note: On 4 May 2021, the remaining amateur teams were removed from the competition, letting SSV Ulm advance to the final. Stuttgarter Kickers and TSG Balingen played a semi-final match to determine the second finalist.) (2020–21 season)	29 May 2021	Stuttgart	TSG Balingen	0–3	**SSV Ulm**		Report
