= 2024–25 Verbandspokal =

Tournament details
- Country: Germany
- Teams: 44

The 2024–25 Verbandspokal (English: 2024–25 Association Cup) consisted of twenty-one regional cup competitions, the Verbandspokale, the qualifying competition for the 2025–26 DFB-Pokal, the German Cup.

All clubs from the 3. Liga and below could enter the regional Verbandspokale, subject to the rules and regulations of each region. Clubs from the Bundesliga and 2. Bundesliga do not enter but were instead directly qualified for the first round of the DFB-Pokal. Reserve teams were not permitted to take part in the DFB-Pokal or the Verbandspokale. The precise rules of each regional Verbandspokal were laid down by the regional football association organising it.

All twenty-one winners qualified for the first round of the German Cup in the following season. Three additional clubs also qualified for the first round of the German Cup, these being from the three largest state associations, Bavaria, Westphalia and Lower Saxony. The Lower Saxony Cup was split into two paths, one for teams from the 3. Liga and the Regionalliga Nord and one for the teams from lower leagues. The winners of both paths qualified for the DFB-Pokal. In Bavaria the best-placed non-reserve Regionalliga Bayern team qualified for the DFB-Pokal, while in Westphalia the spot alternates between the Oberliga Westfalen champion and best-placed Westphalian team from the Regionalliga West. This season, the best-placed Regionalliga West team qualified .

Most of the finals of the Verbandspokal competitions were played on the Amateurs' Final Day (German: Finaltag der Amateure), on 24 May 2025.

== Competitions ==
The finals of the 2024–25 Verbandspokal competitions (winners listed in bold):

Cup	Date	Location	Team 1	Result	Team 2	Report
Baden Cup (2024–25 season)	24 May 2025	Eppingen	GU-Türk. SV Pforzheim	0–4	**SV Sandhausen**	Report
Bavarian Cup (Note: As one of the three largest regional associations, Bavaria gets an additional DFB-Pokal berth, which goes to the best non-reserve team of the Regionalliga Bayern.) (2024–25 season)	24 May 2025	Illertissen	**FV Illertissen**	1–0	SpVgg Unterhaching	Report
Berlin Cup (2024–25 season)	24 May 2025	Berlin	Eintracht Mahlsdorf	0–2	**BFC Dynamo**	Report
Brandenburg Cup (2024–25 season)	24 May 2025	Neuruppin	VfB Krieschow	0–1	**RSV Eintracht**	Report
Bremen Cup (2024–25 season)	24 May 2025	Bremen	**SV Hemelingen**	1–0	Bremer SV	Report
Hamburg Cup (2024–25 season)	24 May 2025	Hamburg	**Eintracht Norderstedt**	0–0 (5–4 p)	USC Paloma	Report
Hessian Cup (2024–25 season)	24 May 2025	Frankfurt	Hessen Kassel	1–1 (4–5 p)	**Wehen Wiesbaden**	Report
Lower Rhine Cup (2024–25 season)	24 May 2025	Duisburg	MSV Duisburg	1–2	**Rot-Weiss Essen**	Report
Lower Saxony Cup (Note: As one of the three largest regional associations, Lower Saxony gets an additional DFB-Pokal berth, which goes to the winner of the second cup path.) (2024–25 season (3. Liga / Regionalliga)) (2024–25 season (amateurs))	24 May 2025	Osnabrück	VfL Osnabrück	2–4	**Blau-Weiß Lohne**	Report
Lower Saxony Cup (2024–25 season (3. Liga / Regionalliga)) (2024–25 season (amateurs))	24 May 2025	Rehden	Schwarz-Weiß Rehden	1–2	**Atlas Delmenhorst**	Report
Mecklenburg-Vorpommern Cup (2024–25 season)	24 May 2025	Waren	SV Pastow	0–7	**Hansa Rostock**	Report
Middle Rhine Cup (2024–25 season)	24 May 2025	Cologne	Alemannia Aachen	2–3	**Viktoria Köln**	Report
Rhineland Cup (2024–25 season)	24 May 2025	Koblenz	Rot-Weiß Koblenz	0–2	**FV Engers**	Report
Saarland Cup (2024–25 season)	24 May 2025	Saarbrücken	**FC 08 Homburg**	9–0	Palatia Limbach	Report
Saxony Cup (2024–25 season)	24 May 2025	Leipzig	**Lokomotive Leipzig**	0–0 (a.e.t.) (6–5 p)	Erzgebirge Aue	Report
Saxony-Anhalt Cup (2024–25 season)	24 May 2025	Halle	Lok Stendal	0–1	**Hallescher FC**	Report
Schleswig-Holstein Cup (2024–25 season)	24 May 2025	Lübeck	**VfB Lübeck**	2–1	Kaltenkirchener TS	Report
South Baden Cup (2024–25 season)	24 May 2025	Freiburg	**Bahlinger SC**	0–0 (a.e.t.) (5–3 p)	FC Auggen	Report
Southwestern Cup (2024–25 season)	24 May 2025	Weingarten	**FK Pirmasens**	2–1	Schott Mainz	Report
Thuringian Cup (2024–25 season)	24 May 2025	Meuselwitz	FC An der Fahner Höhe	1–3	**ZFC Meuselwitz**	Report
Westphalian Cup (Note: As one of the three largest regional associations, Westphalia gets an additional DFB-Pokal berth, which will alternate between the Oberliga Westfalen champion and best-placed Westphalian team from the Regionalliga West. This year, the Regionalliga West champion qualifies.) (2024–25 season)	29 May 2025	Bielefeld	**Arminia Bielefeld**	2–0	Sportfreunde Lotte	Report
Württemberg Cup (2024–25 season)	24 May 2025	Stuttgart	TSG Balingen	0–2	**Sonnenhof Großaspach**	Report
