= SV Roßbach/Verscheid =

German football club

- Full name: Sport-Verein Roßbach e.V. 1968
- Nickname(s): Roßbach
- Founded: 1968
- Ground: Sportplatz in der Au
- Capacity: 2.000
- Chairman: Jürgen Becker
- League: Kreisliga B Nord Westerwald/Wied (IX)
- 2015–16: Kreisliga A Westerwald/Wied (VIII), 12th (relegated)
Home colours	Away colours

SV Roßbach/Verscheid is a German association football club based in Roßbach/Wied, Rhineland-Palatinate. The club's greatest success has been to play in the Oberliga Südwest, later the Oberliga Rheinland-Pfalz/Saar, for seven seasons from 2007 to 2014.

== History ==
In 2001 Roßbach advanced to the Verbandsliga Rheinland (V) and in 2005–06 captured the title there, but was not immediately promoted to the fourth tier Oberliga Südwest as it had begun the season as SG Rossbach, a Sportgemeinschaft (sports community) and not as a sports club, and so were ineligible as they did not meet German Football Association (Deutsche Fussball Bund or German Football Association) requirements as an organization. In the following season, the club's campaign ended with a second Verbandsliga championship and this time, after the earlier reorganization of the association as Sportverein Roßbach/Wied in anticipation of an advance, the side moved up to Oberliga play.

In association with neighbouring clubs FC Waldbreitbach and SG Niederbreitbach, SV helped form JSG Wiedtal in 2003 as a youth club.

Roßbach qualified for the 2006–07 German Cup, and hosted Bundesliga side Borussia Mönchengladbach in the first round, losing 1:4. They also qualified for the 2012–13 German Cup, where they hosted FSV Mainz 05.

After seven seasons at Oberliga level the club was relegated back to the Rheinlandliga in 2014 but instead withdrew to the tier nine Kreisliga B Nord Westerwald/Wied. A title at this level took the club up to the Kreisliga A in 2015 but it was promptly relegated again.

== Stadium ==
SV Roßbach/Verscheid currently play at the Sportplatz in der Au, which has a capacity of 2.000.

The Sportplatz in der Au was built in 1987–88 with the help of the City of Roßbach at a cost of approximately 75,000 DM. The club hopes to move into a purpose-built football stadium by the year 2010 however, as with all semi-professional teams, financing the move is proving a major stumbling block.

== Honours ==
The club's honours:

=== League ===
- Verbandsliga Rheinland (V)
  - Champions: 2006, 2007

=== Cup ===
- Rhineland Cup
  - Winners: 2006, 2012
  - Runners-up: 2005, 2006, 2009

== Recent seasons ==
The recent season-by-season performance of the club:

Season	Division	Tier	Position
2001–02	Verbandsliga Rheinland	V	9th
2002–03	Verbandsliga Rheinland	V	5th
2003–04	Verbandsliga Rheinland	V	4th
2004–05	Verbandsliga Rheinland	V	3rd
2005–06	Verbandsliga Rheinland	V	1st
2006–07	Verbandsliga Rheinland	V	1st ↑
2007–08	Oberliga Südwest	IV	12th
2008–09	Oberliga Südwest	V	8th
2009–10	Oberliga Südwest	V	14th
2010–11	Oberliga Südwest	V	13th
2011–12	Oberliga Südwest	V	15th
2012–13	Oberliga Rheinland-Pfalz/Saar	V	12th
2013–14	Oberliga Rheinland-Pfalz/Saar	V	18th ↓
2014–15	Kreisliga B Nord Westerwald/Wied	IX	1st ↑
2015–16	Kreisliga A Westerwald/Wied	VIII	12th ↓
2016–17	Kreisliga B Nord Westerwald/Wied	IX	

- With the introduction of the Regionalligas in 1994 and the 3. Liga in 2008 as the new third tier, below the 2. Bundesliga, all leagues below dropped one tier. In 2012 the Oberliga Südwest was renamed Oberliga Rheinland-Pfalz/Saar.

↑ Promoted	↓ Relegated
