= Rhineland Cup =

- Founded: 1953
- Region: Rheinland-Pfalz, Germany
- Qualifier for: DFB-Pokal
- Current champions: Eintracht Trier (2025–26)
- Most championships: Eintracht Trier (15 titles)

The Rhineland Cup (German: Rheinlandpokal) is one of the 21 regional cup competitions of German football. The winner of the competition gains entry to the first round of the German Cup. It is limited to clubs from the northern part of Rhineland-Palatinate, however, teams from the Bundesliga and 2. Bundesliga are not permitted to compete. It is one of two cup competitions in the state, the other being the South West Cup, which covers roughly the southern half of the state.

The competition is sponsored by the Bitburger brewery and carries the name Bitburger-Verbandspokal. In the past, it was sponsored by Oddset (Sports betting) and named Oddset-Pokal. It is operated by theRhineland Football Association, the Fußballverband Rheinland, or FVR.

The competition does not cover the whole of the historical region of Rhineland, only a part of it.

== History ==
The Cup was established in 1953. The Rhineland Cup is played annually.

From 1974 onwards, the winner of the South West Cup qualified for the first round of the German Cup.

Since the establishment of the 3. Liga in 2008, reserve teams can not take part in the German Cup anymore, but are permitted to play in the regional competitions.

== Modus ==
Clubs from fully professional leagues are not permitted to enter the competition, meaning, no teams from the Bundesliga and the 2. Bundesliga can compete. The fact that professional clubs were never permitted to compete in the competition accounts for the regions most successful club, Eintracht Trier, not taking out the cup until after it was relegated from professional football in 1973.

All clubs from the Rhineland playing in the 3. Liga (III), Regionalliga West (IV), Oberliga Südwest (V), Verbandsliga Rheinland (VI) and the three Bezirksligas (VII) gain direct entry to the first round. Additionally, the best teams out of the regional Kreis (District) cup competitions also qualify for the first round. The lower classed team always receives home advantage, except in the final, which is played on neutral ground.

== Cup finals ==
Held annually at the end of season, these were the cup finals since 1954:

Season	Location	Winner	Finalist	Result	Attendance
1953–54	Bad Ems	SpVgg Höhr-Grenzhausen	SV Niederlahnstein	2–0	
1954–55	Neuwied; Metternich; Andernach	Fortuna Kottenheim	TuS Montabaur	2–2 aet 4–4 aet 1–0	
1955–56	Andernach	SC 07 Bad Neuenahr	SV Niederlahnstein	3–3 aet 6–4 aet	
1956–57	Simmern	FC Germania Metternich	TuS Mayen	4–4 ^{1}	
1957–58	Betzdorf	Sportfreunde Herdorf	SV Niederfischbach	3–1	
1958–59	Neuwied	VfB Wissen	SC Rhein/Ahr Sinzig	2–1	
1959–60	Wissen	Sportfreunde Herdorf	SC Rhein/Ahr Sinzig	3–1	
1960–61	Neuwied	VfB Wissen	SV Ehrang	8–0	
1961–62	Andernach	SC Rhein/Ahr Sinzig	FV Rübenach	4–1	
1962–63	Bad Marienberg	FC Horchheim	SV Elkenroth	1–0	
1963–64	Neuwied	SpVgg Andernach	TuS Mayen	3–2 aet	
1964–65	Bad Marienberg	VfL Trier	SV Elkenroth	1–0	
1965–66	Montabaur	TuS Mayen	Sportfreunde Herdorf	1–0	
1966–67	Neuwied	SSV Mülheim	FV Engers	7–0	
1967–68	Mülheim	FC Germania Metternich	SC Sinzig	2–1	
1968–69	Andernach; Sinzig	SC 07 Bad Neuenahr	FC Alemannia Plaidt	2–2 aet 3–0	
1969–70	Neuwied; Bad Neuenahr	SC Rhein/AhrSinzig	FV Engers	2–2 aet 5–1	
1970–71	Metternich	SC Oberlahnstein	VfB Wissen	3–2	
1971–72	Metternich	VfB Lützel	SSV Mülheim	1–0	
1972–73	Bendorf	SpVgg Andernach	VfB Wissen	2–0	
1973–74	Bitburg	TuS Mayen	Eintracht Trier	1–0	
1974–75	not held				
1975–76	Neuwied	TuS Mayen	SpVgg Andernach	3–0	
1976–77	Bendorf	SG Ellingen/Bonefeld	Sportfreunde Eisbachtal	2–1	
1977–78	Neuwied	TuS Neuendorf	SpVgg EGC Wirges	1–0	
1978–79	Neuwied	TuS Neuendorf	Sportfreunde Eisbachtal	4–1	
1979–80	Metternich	Sportfreunde Eisbachtal	TSV Lehmen/Kattenes	3–1	
1980–81	Andernach	SV Leiwen	VfL Hamm	2–1	
1981–82	Wissen	Eintracht Trier	VfB Wissen	2–2 aet (5–2 pen)	
1982–83	Bendorf	SG Ellingen/Bonefeld	FSV Salmrohr	1–1 aet (7–6 pen)	
1983–84	Hermeskeil	Eintracht Trier	FSV Salmrohr	2–1	
1984–85	Mayen	Eintracht Trier	Sportfreunde Eisbachtal	3–0	
1985–86	Mayen	VfL Hamm	FSV Salmrohr	2–0	
1986–87	Mayen	VfL Hamm	SV Leiwen	2–1	
1987–88	Trier	FC Bitburg	FSV Salmrohr	6–5 aet	
1988–89	Neuwied	FSV Salmrohr	VfL Hamm	2–1	
1989–90	Emmelshausen	Eintracht Trier	Sportfreunde Daaden	4–1	
1990–91	Plaidt	SpVgg EGC Wirges	Eintracht Trier	2–0	450
1991–92	Leiwen	FSV Salmrohr	Eintracht Trier	2–1	2,500
1992–93	Polch	FSV Salmrohr	Sportfreunde Eisbachtal	3–1	
1993–94	Klausen	FSV Salmrohr	SV Wittlich	2–2 aet (6–3 pen)	1,000
1994–95	Bitburg	FSV Salmrohr	Eintracht Trier	3–0	2,000
1995–96	Leiwen	FSV Salmrohr	Eintracht Trier	1–0	900
1996–97	Emmelshausen, 4 June 1997	Eintracht Trier	FV Rheinbrohl	2–1	700
1997–98	Polch	Sportfreunde Eisbachtal	SV Prüm	2–0	700
1998–99	Mayen	VfL Hamm	Eintracht Trier	2–0	300
1999–2000	Hachenburg, 31 May 2000	VfL Hamm	SpVgg EGC Wirges	3–0	1,300
2000–01	Salmrohr, 30 May 2001	Eintracht Trier	TuS Koblenz	1–1 aet (6–4 pen)	1,000
2001–02	Darscheid, 29 May 2002	FSV Salmrohr	TuS Koblenz	2–1	1,500
2002–03	Darscheid, 28 May 2003	SpVgg EGC Wirges	Eintracht Trier II	5–2	750
2003–04	Mülheim-Kärlich, 19 May 2004	TuS Mayen	SG Betzdorf	1–1 aet (4–1 pen)	1,650
2004–05	Wirges, 25 May 2005	TuS Koblenz	SG Roßbach/Verscheid	2–0	2,500
2005–06	Bad Ems, 31 May 2006	TuS Koblenz	SG Roßbach/Verscheid	2–0	2,100
2006–07	Kruft, 7 June 2007	Eintracht Trier	TuS Oberwinter	2–1 aet	2,000
2007–08	Salmrohr	Eintracht Trier	TuS Koblenz II	2–0	
2008–09	Polch, 10 June 2009	Eintracht Trier	SV Roßbach/Verscheid	2–0 aet	2,400
2009–10	Emmelshausen, 2 June 2010	Eintracht Trier	Spvgg Burgbrohl	2–1	1,200
2010–11	25 May 2011	Eintracht Trier	TuS Koblenz	2–0	
2011–12	Emmelshausen, 30 May 2012	SV Roßbach/Verscheid	TuS Mayen	2–0	
2012–13	Salmrohr, 29 May 2013	Eintracht Trier	FSV Salmrohr	4–0	
2013–14	Trier, 28 May 2014	Eintracht Trier	SG Altenkirchen	3–0	
2014–15	Polch, 3 June 2015	FSV Salmrohr	Spvgg Burgbrohl	1–1 (5–4 pen)	2,081
2015–16	Wissen, 28 May 2016	Eintracht Trier	SG HWW Niederroßbach	5–1	1,766
2016–17	Salmtal, 25 May 2017	TuS Koblenz	Eintracht Trier	2–1	4,112
2017–18	Koblenz, 21 May 2018	TuS Rot-Weiss Koblenz	TuS Koblenz	2–0	
2018–19	Bad Neuenahr, 25 May 2019	FSV Salmrohr	TuS Koblenz	2–2 (a.e.t.) (4–3 p)	2,715
2019–20	Koblenz, 22 August 2020	FV Engers	FC Karbach	5–0	350
2020–21	Koblenz, 29 May 2021	FC Rot-Weiss Koblenz	VfB Linz	6–1	100
2021–22	Koblenz, 21 May 2022	FV Engers	FC Karbach	1–0	1,470
2022–23	Koblenz, 3 June 2023	FC Rot-Weiß Koblenz	TuS Immendorf	1–0	
2023–24	Koblenz, 25 May 2024	TuS Koblenz	SG Schneifel 2006	2–0	4,112
2024–25	Koblenz, 24 May 2025	FV Engers	Rot-Weiß Koblenz	2–0	2,359
2025–26	Trier, 23 May 2026	Eintracht Trier	TuS Koblenz	1–0	9,000

- Source: "Alle Rheinlandpokalsieger Herren" (in German). FVR. Archived from the original on 15 February 2012.
- Winners in **bold**
- ^{1} TuS Mayen left the field at 4–4, Metternich declared the winner.

== Winners ==
Listed in order of wins, the Cup winners are:

Club	Wins
Eintracht Trier	15
FSV Salmrohr	9
VfL Hamm	4
TuS Mayen	4
TuS Koblenz	4
Rot-Weiß Koblenz	3
FV Engers	3
SpVgg EGC Wirges	2
Sportfreunde Eisbachtal	2
SG Ellingen/Bonefeld	2
SpVgg Andernach	2
SC Rhein/Ahr Sinzig	2
VfB Wissen	2
Sportfreunde Herdorf	2
FC Germania Metternich	2
SC 07 Bad Neuenahr	2
SV Roßbach/Verscheid	2
TuS Neuendorf	2
FC Bitburg	1
SV Leiwen	1
VfB Lützel	1
SC Oberlahnstein	1
SSV Mülheim	1
VfL Trier	1
FC Horchheim	1
Fortuna Kottenheim	1
SpVgg Höhr-Grenzhausen	1
