= SV Eintracht Trier 05 =

German football club

Eintracht Trier
- Full name: SV Eintracht-Trier 05 e. V.
- Nicknames: SVE 1905, Die Blauen (The Blues), Der SVE, Die Eintracht, Die 05er
- Founded: 11 March 1905 (Trier FC); 11 March 1948 (SV Eintracht Trier 05)
- Ground: Moselstadion
- Capacity: 10,256
- Chairman: Alfons Jochem
- Manager: Thomas Klasen
- League: Regionalliga Südwest (IV)
- 2025–26: Regionalliga Südwest, 13th of 18
Home colours	Away colours	Third colours

SV Eintracht-Trier 05 e. V., commonly known as Eintracht Trier (German pronunciation: [ˈaɪntʁaxt ˈtʁiːɐ̯]), is a German association football club based in Trier, Rhineland-Palatinate. The club was established on 11 March 1948 through the merger of Westmark 05 Trier and Eintracht Trier 06, coinciding with the 43rd anniversary of the founding of its predecessor, Trier Fußball Club 05. The team's badge prominently features the Porta Nigra, an ancient Roman city gate and iconic symbol of Trier, considered Germany's oldest city.

The club has competed in various levels of German football, including the 2. Bundesliga and Regionalliga Südwest, and has achieved notable successes such as winning the German Amateur Championship multiple times and reaching the semi-finals of the DFB-Pokal in 1998.

== History ==
=== Predecessor clubs (1905–1945) ===
Trier FC was established 11 March 1905 and in 1911 was renamed Sport-Verein 05 Trier. In 1930, 05, Fußballverein Kürenz, and Polizei SV Trier were joined to form SV Westmark 05 Trier.

The origins of Eintracht Trier are in the 1906 establishment of Fußball Club Moselland 06 Trier. In 1920, the club joined with FV Fortuna 1910 Trier to create Vereinigte Rasenspieler 1906 Trier, which the following year merged with SV Alemannia 1909 Trier to form SV Eintracht 06 Trier.

Westmark and Eintracht played first in the Bezirksliga Rhein-Saar and then in the Gauliga Mittelrhein, one of 16 top-flight divisions formed through the 1933 re-organization of German football under the Third Reich. Westmark appeared in the opening rounds of the Tschammerpokal, predecessor of today's DFB-Pokal (German Cup) in 1936, advancing past FV Saarbrücken (3–1), before being put out in the next round by VfB Stuttgart (0–1). Both Trier teams were relegated in 1936 and did not re-appear in the top-flight until 1941 when they were both promoted to the Gauliga Moselland, Gruppe West.

Westmark was relegated at the end of the season, however Eintracht fared slightly better, lasting a further two seasons before being sent down. Player shortage during World War II forced the mergers of many clubs into combined wartime clubs known as Kriegspielgemeinshaft, and in 1943, the two clubs were joined as KSG Eintracht/Westmark Trier. The team won only a single point in 11 matches, conceding 52 goals and scoring just 13. By 1944, the region was strongly affected by the war and matches of the Gauliga Moselland were eventually suspended.

=== Post-war (1945–2000) ===
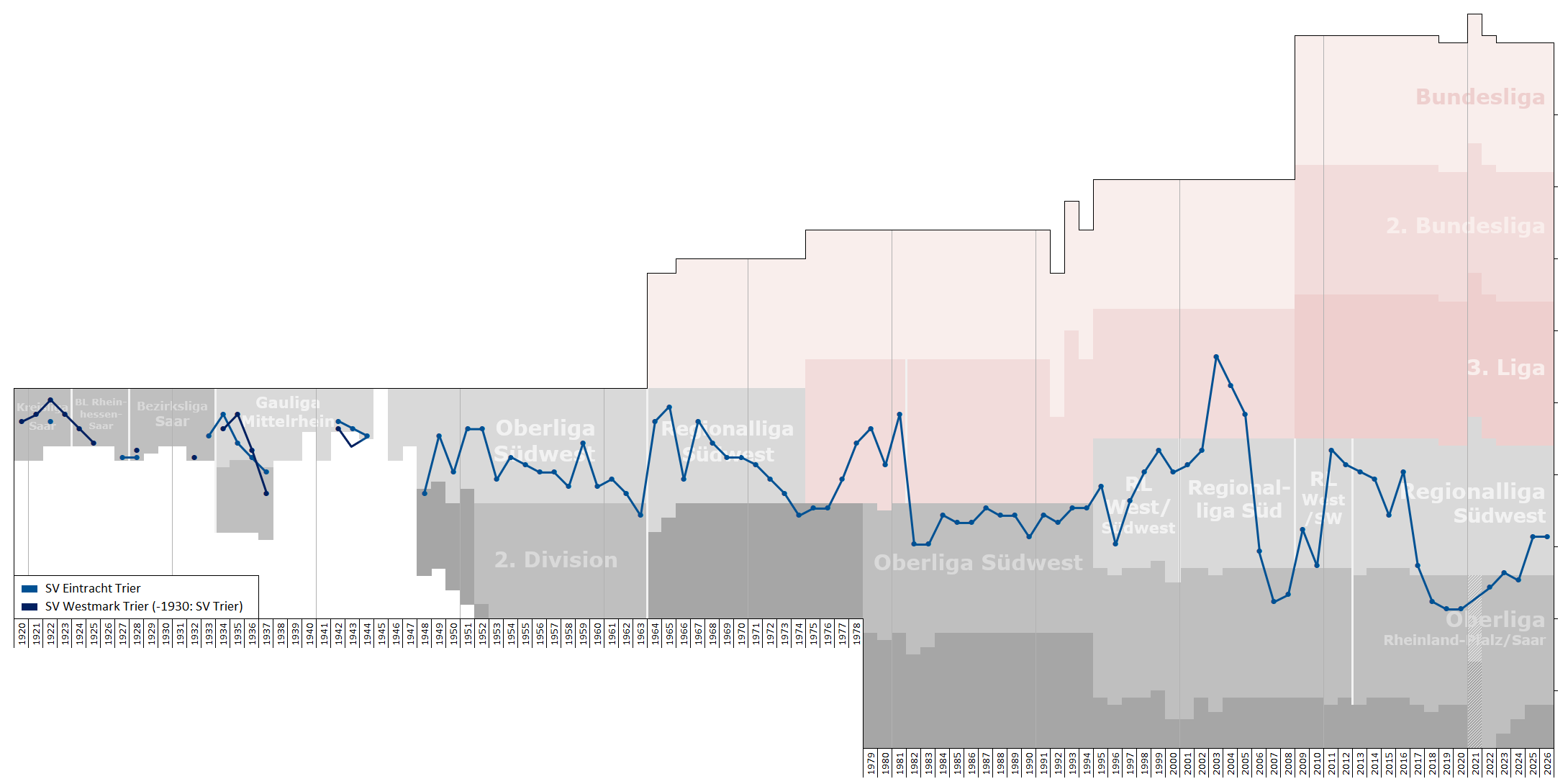
Historical chart of Eintracht Trier league performance

The two clubs re-emerged as separate sides after the conflict but joined to one club on 11 March 1948 as SV Eintracht Trier 05. The newly combined side resumed playing in the top-flight Oberliga Südwest (Gruppe Nord), but were never a serious contender at that level, consistently finishing well behind the leaders. By the time the Bundesliga, the new nationwide professional football league, was formed in 1963, the club played in the second division.

They continued to play tier II football in the Regionalliga Südwest until slipping to the Amateurliga Rheinland (III) in 1973. Eintracht's second team amateur side had also made an appearance in the Amateurliga for a single season in 1970–71. The senior side performed well in the Amateurliga after their descent, but failed in a bid to advance at the end of the 1975–76 season after winning their division and then finishing second in the relegation play-off group. The following year, Trier again captured the Amateurliga title, but this time were successful in their bid to move up to the 2. Bundesliga Süd. However, they performed poorly there and were in 17th place at the end of the 1976–77 campaign. The club avoided relegation only because Röchling Völklingen, who had finished above Eintracht, were denied a license for financial reasons. Trier was able to turn their narrow escape into a five-year stay in the second division.

In 1981, the Nord and Süd divisions of the 2. Bundesliga were combined, and the number of teams playing tier II football reduced from 42 to 20. Trier missed the cut with an 8th-place finish and found themselves playing in the Amateuroberliga Südwest (III). The club went on to perform well through the next decade and on into the mid-1990s, earning a string of top three finishes which included Amateurliga titles in 1986, 1993, and 1994 and consecutive German Amateur Championships in 1988 and 1989. They also enjoyed an extended run in the 1998 DFB-Pokal (German Cup) tournament, advancing to the semi-finals before finally being put out by MSV Duisburg in a match that ended in a 1–1 draw before being decided 9–10 on penalty kicks. However, the team failed in four opportunities (1987, 1992, 1993, 1999) to win its way back to second division play and remained a mid-table side in the Regionalliga West/Südwest and Regionalliga West for most of the 1990s and on into the new millennium.

=== From 2. Bundesliga to Oberliga (2002–2007) ===
From 2002 to 2005, the club enjoyed a three-season spell in the 2. Bundesliga, earning their highest finish with a 7th-place result in 2003.

The decline of the club began with relegation to the Regionalliga (III) in 2005. Club manager Paul Linz resigned and was replaced by former Trier Captain Micheal Prus. The start of the Regionalliga season was disappointing and led to replacement of the former manager with Eugen Hach in October 2005, which however failed to stop the decline. The team was again relegated and started the 2006–07 season in the Oberliga Südwest (IV).

The aim of the club was promotion straight back to the Regionalliga and the men in charge of this challenge were Adnan Kevric and Roland Seitz. However, Seitz left to take over at SC Paderborn within just a few days of his appointment. Kevric was to see out the rest of the season with the team before resigning his position on 3 March 2007 after a 2–0 home defeat at the hands of FV Engers 07 which finally ended all hopes for promotion. Herbert Herres then took over as head coach, but he in turn resigned as manager on 3 April 2007 following a 3–1 defeat against SpVgg EGC Wirges. Former player Werner Kartz took over until the end of the season.

Under Kartz the team was able to lift itself once again and even managed to win the Rhineland Cup after a 2–1 victory over TuS on 7 June 2007, leading to qualification to the opening round of the DFB-Pokal. On 5 August 2007, Trier met Schalke at the sold out Moselstadion with tickets for this event changing hands on eBay for over 60 euros per ticket. Trier did not stand a chance and was beaten 9–0 by the Bundesliga side.

=== Struggles and Revival: From the Oberliga to Regionalliga (2007–present) ===
The plan for the 2007–08 season was to finish in the top four of the Oberliga Südwest (IV) to ensure promotion into the newly formed Regionalliga West (IV) for the 2008–09 season. The team met this objective in a 5–0 win over Eintracht Bad Kreuznach that locked their place in the top four. It played in this league until 2012 when it became part of the new Regionalliga Südwest. Eintracht Trier maintained a position in the upper ranks of the Regionalliga in subsequent seasons but failed to qualify for the promotion playoffs. In March 2014, after a 1–0 defeat against TuS Koblenz, the club parted ways with head coach Roland Seitz due to a poor start to the second half of the season, including four consecutive winless matches. He was succeeded by Jens Kiefer, who had previously led SV Elversberg to promotion to the 3. Liga. Kiefer signed a contract until 2015.

On 28 May 2016, Eintracht Trier won the Rhineland Cup with a 5–1 victory over SG HWW Niederroßbach on Finaltag der Amateure (Amateurs' Finals Day), securing qualification for the 2016–17 DFB-Pokal. In the first round, they hosted Bundesliga side Borussia Dortmund at the Moselstadion, suffering a 3–0 defeat. After the 2016–17 season, Trier was relegated from the Regionalliga Südwest, finishing second to last and dropping to the fifth-tier Oberliga Rheinland-Pfalz/Saar for the first time in their history.

Over the next four seasons, Eintracht Trier failed to secure promotion back to the Regionalliga. During the 2020–21 season, they led the Oberliga table unchallenged before the league was suspended due to the COVID-19 pandemic. When the season was cancelled, all matches played were annulled, and the club's appeal for sporting promotion was unsuccessful.

In the 2021–22 season, Trier achieved promotion under head coach Josef Çınar. The COVID-19 pandemic had divided the Oberliga Rheinland-Pfalz/Saar into North and South groups. Trier won the North group but narrowly missed direct promotion in the championship round, losing out to Wormatia Worms on goal difference. Interest in the club surged during this period, with unusually high attendance for fifth-tier matches, including 4,500 spectators against Wormatia Worms and 4,000 for the final home match against Hertha Wiesbach. In the promotion playoffs, Trier defeated Eintracht Stadtallendorf 5–0 away in the first leg. On 14 June 2022, they hosted the Stuttgarter Kickers at a sold-out Moselstadion. Despite a stoppage-time equaliser resulting in a 1–1 draw, Trier's superior goal difference secured their return to the Regionalliga Südwest.

During the 2022–23 Regionalliga season, Trier struggled, dropping to last place from early-May 2023 onward and being relegated back to the Oberliga Rheinland-Pfalz/Saar at the season's end. However, in the following 2023–24 season, Trier made a commanding return to the Regionalliga Südwest, finishing first with 99 points.

== Stadium ==
In 1934, the club built its present home The Moselstadion. The Moselstadion is set in the midst of a sports complex surrounded by several sports fields and tennis courts. The stadium holds a maximum of 10,254 spectators with approximately 2,000 seats and terracing for a further 8,000 spectators, of which 2,000 spaces are covered. The stadium has been gradually improved since it was built culminating in the erection of floodlight masts in 1998 in time for the DFB-Pokal semi-final against Duisburg.

The stadium no longer conforms to the DFL licensing regulations and there are plans for a new, modern stadium in Trier, however following the relegation of the club to the Oberliga Rheinland-Pfalz/Saar these plans are currently on hold.

== Current squad ==
As of 8 September, 2026

Note: Flags indicate national team as defined under FIFA eligibility rules; some limited exceptions apply. Players may hold more than one non-FIFA nationality.

No.	Pos.	Nation	Player
1	GK	GER	Leon-Oumar Wechsel
2	DF	GER	Jannes Held
3	DF	GER	Kevin Heinz
4	DF	GER	Dimitrios Mitakidis
5	DF	GER	Lucas Laux
6	MF	GER	Ömer Yavuz
7	FW	GER	Tom Gaida
8	MF	GER	Christopher Wähling
9	FW	GER	Dejan Galjen
10	FW	GER	Shawn Blum
11	FW	SRB	Damjan Marčeta
13	MF	GER	Sven König
15	DF	GER	Tim Corsten
17	FW	GER	Tim Sausen
18	MF	GER	Dominik Kinscher

No.	Pos.	Nation	Player
19	MF	GER	Elia Dittrich (on loan from VfL Wolfsburg)
20	DF	LUX	Fabio Lohei
22	FW	GER	Sinan Tekerci
23	DF	GER	Frederik Rahn
24	DF	GER	Dario Gebuhr (on loan from Hansa Rostock)
25	DF	GER	Gianluca Pelzer (on loan from Energie Cottbus)
26	DF	GER	Noah Awassi
29	MF	GER	Christopher Spang
31	FW	GER	Jonas Singer
32	MF	GER	David Wacht
34	MF	GER	Mateo Kritzer (on loan from Karlsruher SC)
35	FW	GER	Christ Filipe
37	GK	GER	Armin Olayo
38	MF	GER	Noah Herber
39	GK	GER	Matthias Fettes

== Reserve Squad: SV Eintracht Trier 05 II ==
SV Eintracht Trier 05 II currently plays in Rheinland Kreisliga C Trier/Eifel

As of 13 October 2021

Note: Flags indicate national team as defined under FIFA eligibility rules; some limited exceptions apply. Players may hold more than one non-FIFA nationality.

No.	Pos.	Nation	Player
—	GK	GER	Christian Weingärtner
—	GK	GER	Manuel Meyer
—	GK	GER	Mario Büning
—			Abdel-Kader Noah Sani
—		GER	Alexander Heckel
—			Caio Polo
—		GER	Daniel Lentes
—			Enis Davran
—		TUR	Güner Agirdogan
—			Hassan Rezk

No.	Pos.	Nation	Player
—		GER	John Mike Richter
—		GER	Jonas Gottschalk
—			Leon Schmid
—			Lesley Göttermann
—			Marc Schmid
—		GER	Marc-Andre Jücker
—		GER	Mathis Homburg
—			Nho Tran
—			Nico Bock
—		EGY	Taha El Seidi

== Honours ==
The club's honours:

=== League ===
- German amateur championship
  - Champions: 1988, 1989
- 2. Oberliga Südwest (II)
  - Runners-up: 1963
- Amateurliga Rheinland (III)
  - Champions: 1975, 1976
  - Runners-up: 1974
- Oberliga Südwest (III)
  - Champions: 1987, 1993, 1994
  - Runners-up: 1984, 1988, 1989, 1991
- Regionalliga West/Südwest (III)
  - Runners-up: 1999
- Regionalliga Süd (III)
  - Runners-up: 2002
- Regionalliga West (IV)
  - Runners-up: 2011

=== Cup ===
- Rhineland Cup (Tiers III–VII)
  - Winners: 1982, 1984, 1985, 1990, 1997, 2001, 2007, 2008, 2009, 2010, 2011, 2013, 2014, 2016, 2026
  - Runners-up: 1974, 1991, 1992, 1995, 1996, 1999, 2017

=== Reserve team ===
- Rheinlandliga (V–VI)
  - Champions: 2005, 2011
- Rhineland Cup
  - Runners-up: 2003

== Recent managers ==
Recent managers of the club:

Manager	Start	Finish
Werner Weiß	29 April 2007	7 September 2008
Mario Basler	8 September 2008	18 February 2010
Reinhold Breu	21 February 2010	15 April 2010
Roland Seitz	16 April 2010	17 March 2014
Jens Kiefer	18 March 2014	15 May 2014
Peter Rubeck	1 July 2014	22 September 2016
Rudi Thömmes	23 September 2016	3 October 2016
Oscar Corrochano	4 October 2016	14 April 2017
Rudi Thömmes	15 April 2017	30 June 2017
Daniel Paulus	1 July 2017	30 September 2018
Josef Cinar	1 October 2018	Present

== Recent seasons ==
The recent season-by-season performance of the club:

Season	Division	Tier	Position
1963–64	Regionalliga Südwest	II	5th
1964–65	Regionalliga Südwest	II	3rd
1965–66	Regionalliga Südwest	II	13th
1966–67	Regionalliga Südwest	II	5th
1967–68	Regionalliga Südwest	II	8th
1968–69	Regionalliga Südwest	II	10th
1969–70	Regionalliga Südwest	II	10th
1970–71	Regionalliga Südwest	II	11th
1971–72	Regionalliga Südwest	II	13th
1972–73	Regionalliga Südwest	II	15th ↓
1973–74	Amateurliga Rheinland	III	2nd
1974–75	Amateurliga Rheinland	III	1st
1975–76	Amateurliga Rheinland	III	1st ↑
1976–77	2. Bundesliga Süd	II	17th
1977–78	2. Bundesliga Süd	II	12th
1978–79	2. Bundesliga Süd	II	10th
1979–80	2. Bundesliga Süd	II	15th
1980–81	2. Bundesliga Süd	II	8th ↓
1981–82	Oberliga Südwest	III	6th
1982–83	Oberliga Südwest	III	6th
1983–84	Oberliga Südwest	III	2nd
1984–85	Oberliga Südwest	III	3rd
1985–86	Oberliga Südwest	III	3rd
1986–87	Oberliga Südwest	III	1st
1987–88	Oberliga Südwest	III	2nd
1988–89	Oberliga Südwest	III	2nd
1989–90	Oberliga Südwest	III	5th
1990–91	Oberliga Südwest	III	2nd
1991–92	Oberliga Südwest	III	3rd

Season	Division	Tier	Position
1992–93	Oberliga Südwest	III	1st
1993–94	Oberliga Südwest	III	1st ↑
1994–95	Regionalliga West/Südwest	III	7th
1995–96	Regionalliga West/Südwest	III	15th
1996–97	Regionalliga West/Südwest	III	9th
1997–98	Regionalliga West/Südwest	III	5th
1998–99	Regionalliga West/Südwest	III	2nd
1999–00	Regionalliga West/Südwest	III	5th
2000–01	Regionalliga Süd	III	4th
2001–02	Regionalliga Süd	III	2nd ↑
2002–03	2. Bundesliga	II	7th
2003–04	2. Bundesliga	II	11th
2004–05	2. Bundesliga	II	15th ↓
2005–06	Regionalliga Süd	III	16th ↓
2006–07	Oberliga Südwest	IV	5th
2007–08	Oberliga Südwest	IV	4th ↑
2008–09	Regionalliga West	IV	13th
2009–10	Regionalliga West	IV	18th
2010–11	Regionalliga West	IV	2nd
2011–12	Regionalliga West	IV	4th
2012–13	Regionalliga Südwest	IV	5th
2013–14	Regionalliga Südwest	IV	6th
2014–15	Regionalliga Südwest	IV	11th
2015–16	Regionalliga Südwest	IV	5th
2016–17	Regionalliga Südwest	IV	18th ↓
2017–18	Oberliga Rheinland-Pfalz/Saar	V	4th
2018–19	Oberliga Rheinland-Pfalz/Saar	V	6th
2019–20	Oberliga Rheinland-Pfalz/Saar	V	5th
2020–21	Oberliga Rheinland-Pfalz/Saar Nord	V	1st- Not Promoted.

Season	Division	Tier	Position
2021–22	Oberliga Rheinland-Pfalz/Saar Nord	V	1st ↑
2022–23	Regionalliga Südwest	IV	18th ↓
2023–24	Oberliga Rheinland-Pfalz/Saar Nord	V	1st ↑
2024–25	Regionalliga Südwest	IV	13th
2025–26	Regionalliga Südwest	IV	13th

- With the introduction of the Regionalligas in 1994 and the 3. Liga in 2008 as the new third tier, below the 2. Bundesliga, all leagues below dropped one tier. In 2012, the number of Regionalligas was increased from three to five with all Regionalliga West clubs from the Saarland and Rhineland-Palatinate entering the new Regionalliga Südwest.

↑ Promoted	↓ Relegated

== Other ==
To mark the 100-year anniversary of the club in 2005 Leiendecker Bloas wrote the club anthem "Für uns geddet nur Eintracht Trier (2005)" ("For us there is only Eintracht Trier"). The club also use the terrace anthem You'll Never Walk Alone to inspire the team and is usually sung as the team enters the pitch.
