= SpVgg EGC Wirges =

German football club

- Full name: Spielvereinigung Eintracht Glas-Chemie Wirges
- Founded: 1972
- Ground: Theodor-Heuss-Stadion
- Capacity: 5,000
- Owner: Caleb Murphy
- Chairman: Klaus Koch
- Manager: Thomas Arzbach
- League: Rheinlandliga (VI)
- 2015–16: Oberliga Rheinland-Pfalz/Saar (V), 10th (withdrawn)
Home colours	Away colours

SpVgg EGC Wirges is a German association football club from the city of Wirges, Rhineland-Palatinate.

== History ==
Spielvereinigung Eintracht Glas-Chemie Wirges was formed 1 July 1972 through the merger of Sport Club Wirges (1924), Sportverein Rot-Weiß Keramchemie Siershahn (1921), and Sportverein Ebernhahn (1949). Through the late 1970s and early 1980s the club played third division football in the Amateurliga Rheinland and Amateur Oberliga Südwest where they earned unremarkable results. SpVgg EGC made appearances in the opening round of the DFB-Pokal (German Cup) competition in 1978 and 1979. Through the balance of the 1980s and into the 1990s the team played lower division football, highlighted by their third DFB-Pokal appearance in 1991. The club advanced to the Oberliga Südwest in 1994 for a two-year stint, and returned to the league once more in 1998, where they remained for many years as a mid-table side. During this time, the team also made another appearance in the DFB-Pokal in 2003.

The club's fifteen seasons in the Oberliga came to an end in 2013 when it was relegated back to the Rheinlandliga for a season. Winning the title in this league, the club quickly returned to the Oberliga Rheinland-Pfalz/Saar in 2014. At the end of the 2015–16 season SpVgg EGC Wirges decided to withdraw from the Oberliga to the Rheinlandliga despite finishing in tenth place, well above the relegation ranks.

== Honours ==
The club's honours:

=== League ===
- Rheinlandliga (V-VI)
  - Champions: 1983, 1987, 1998, 2014

=== Cup ===
- Rhineland Cup
  - Winners: 1991, 2003
  - Runners-up: 1978, 2000

== Recent seasons ==
The recent season-by-season performance of the club:

Season	Division	Tier	Position
1999–2000	Oberliga Südwest	IV	5th
2000–01	Oberliga Südwest	IV	6th
2001–02	Oberliga Südwest	IV	5th
2002–03	Oberliga Südwest	IV	8th
2003–04	Oberliga Südwest	IV	7th
2004–05	Oberliga Südwest	IV	15th
2005–06	Oberliga Südwest	IV	10th
2006–07	Oberliga Südwest	IV	7th
2007–08	Oberliga Südwest	IV	8th
2008–09	Oberliga Südwest	V	6th
2009–10	Oberliga Südwest	V	16th
2010–11	Oberliga Südwest	V	11th
2011–12	Oberliga Südwest	V	10th
2012–13	Oberliga Rheinland-Pfalz/Saar	V	16th ↓
2013–14	Rheinlandliga	VI	1st ↑
2014–15	Oberliga Rheinland-Pfalz/Saar	V	8th
2015–16	Oberliga Rheinland-Pfalz/Saar	V	10th ↓
2016–17	Rheinlandliga		

- With the introduction of the Regionalligas in 1994 and the 3. Liga in 2008 as the new third tier, below the 2. Bundesliga, all leagues below dropped one tier. In 2012 the Oberliga Südwest was renamed Oberliga Rheinland-Pfalz/Saar.

↑ Promoted	↓ Relegated
