= SG Betzdorf =

German football club

- Full name: Sportgemeinschaft 1906 e.V. Betzdorf
- Founded: 1906
- Ground: Auf dem Bühl
- Capacity: 6,500
- Manager: Walter Reitz
- League: Rheinlandliga (VI)
- 2015–16: 15th
Home colours	Away colours

SG Betzdorf is a German association football club from the city of Betzdorf, Rhineland-Palatinate. The team has its origins as a football department established within the gymnastics club Betzdorfer Turnverein on 6 September 1906. The footballers soon became independent as Verein für Jugend- und Volksspiele Betzdorf which was later renamed Betzdorfer Fußball Club 1906.

== History ==
FC was joined by Reichssportverein Betzdorf in 1934 and then was re-united with its parent club Betzdorf TV in 1936 to play as Reichsbahn-SG Betzdorf. The club played second division football on the Bezirksliga Mittelrhein and made failed promotion playoff appearances in 1938 and 1941. They became part of the Gauliga Moselland in 1943 and finished third in the Staffel Ost (Eastern section) of the division. It was intended to resume play in the 1944–45 season with three sections within the division, but by this time Allied armies were entering Germany in the latter stages of World War II and it is not known what teams were able to take the field and how many matches they were able to complete.

Following the war, occupying Allied authorities ordered the dissolution of most organizations in the country, including sports and football clubs. SG disappeared briefly, but was re-established in 1947. The club merged with Eisenbahn-Sportverein Betzdorf in 1962 to form ESG 06 Betzdorf. The combined side made a single season appearance in the Amateurliga Rheinland (III) in 1971–72 but finished last. The union lasted until 1979 when the two sides went their separate ways.

In 1994, SG Betzdorf won promotion to the Oberliga Südwest (IV) for a three-season turn. They were immediately re-promoted out of the Verbandsliga Rheinland (V) and played another two Oberliga seasons. SG returned once again to the Oberliga in 2004, before again being sent down in 2007. The club won promotion to the Oberliga once more in 2007–08 with a Verbandsliga championship. From 2012 to 2013 the Oberliga Südwest was renamed Oberliga Rheinland-Pfalz/Saar, with SGB continuing in this league until 2015 when a last place finish meant relegation.

== Honours ==
- Verbandsliga Rheinland (V)
  - Champions: 2004, 2008

== Recent seasons ==
The recent season-by-season performance of the club:

Season	Division	Tier	Position
1999–2000	Oberliga Südwest	IV	16th ↓
2000–01	Verbandsliga Rheinland	V	5th
2001–02	Verbandsliga Rheinland	V	5th
2002–03	Verbandsliga Rheinland	V	3rd
2003–04	Verbandsliga Rheinland	V	1st ↑
2004–05	Oberliga Südwest	IV	14th
2005–06	Oberliga Südwest	IV	16th
2006–07	Oberliga Südwest	IV	16th ↓
2007–08	Verbandsliga Rheinland	V	1st ↑
2008–09	Oberliga Südwest	V	6th
2009–10	Oberliga Südwest	V	13th
2010–11	Oberliga Südwest	V	3rd
2011–12	Oberliga Südwest	V	14th
2012–13	Oberliga Rheinland-Pfalz/Saar	V	9th
2013–14	Oberliga Rheinland-Pfalz/Saar	V	12th
2014–15	Oberliga Rheinland-Pfalz/Saar	V	18th ↓
2015–16	Rheinlandliga	VI	15th
2016–17	Rheinlandliga	VI	

- With the introduction of the Regionalligas in 1994 and the 3. Liga in 2008 as the new third tier, below the 2. Bundesliga, all leagues below dropped one tier. In 2012 the Oberliga Südwest was renamed Oberliga Rheinland-Pfalz/Saar.

↑ Promoted	↓ Relegated
