= FV Engers 07 =

German football club

- Full name: Fußballverein 1907 Engers
- Founded: 11 June 1907
- Ground: Stadion am Wasserturm
- Capacity: 3,000
- Chairman: Heinz Keuler
- Manager: Günther Wagner
- League: Fußball-Oberliga Rheinland-Pfalz/Saar (V)
- 2025–26: Oberliga Rheinland-Pfalz/Saar, 5th of 18
Home colours	Away colours

FV Engers 07 is a German association football club based in the city of Engers, Rhineland-Palatinate.

== History ==
The club was founded in 1907 as FC Viktoria Engers on 10 July 1907 and later that same year was joined by FC Roland Engers. This combined club then itself joined the gymnastics club Turnverein 1879 Engers in 1910. The footballers resumed their independence as Fußballverein Engers in 1916.

They won their first honours in 1913 as champions of the local C division Bezirk Koblenz. In 1919, FV captured the B division title and then won promotion to top flight regional competition in 1923. In the early 30s the team took part in qualification play for the Gauliga Mittelrhein, one of sixteen top-flight divisions formed in the 1933 reorganization of German football under the Third Reich, but was initially unsuccessful, losing to 1. FC Idar. By the 1941–42 season, the Gauliga Mittelrhein had been split into the Gauliga Köln-Aachen and the Gauliga Moselland, where Engers played in the Gruppe Ost for three seasons as a lower table side until the division collapsed towards the end of World War II.

Immediately following the war the footballers played in the top regional amateur competition before advancing to the Oberliga Südwest-Nord (I) in 1949 where they would remain until sent down after a next to last place finish in 1953. They re-appeared in the first division for a single season in 1955–56, spending most of the 50s and the early 60s in the 2. Oberliga Südwest (II). In 1963, the Bundesliga, Germany's first professional national league, was formed and the country's football competitions were re-structured. Engers failed to qualify to stay up in second division play and landed in the Amateurliga Rheinland (III).

In 1967, Engers celebrated their 60th anniversary with a second-place finish, participation in the opening round of the national amateur championship, and an advance to the final of the Rhineland Pokal. The following season the club plunge to the bottom of the division and were relegated to lower tier local competition. They quickly recovered themselves and played another five seasons in the Amateurliga Rheinland as a lower table side before again disappearing.

A 1981 Kreisliga title advanced FV to the Bezirksliga where they finished second and won the subsequent promotion playoff to move up to the Landesliga Nord (VI) in 1983. Another second-place finish earned the team participation in the promotion round for the Verbandsliga Rheinland (V) where they lost to Untermosel. Two seasons later they redeemed themselves and were promoted.

After five seasons in the Oberliga the club was relegated to the Rheinlandliga in 2008, followed by another relegation in 2012, now to the Bezirksliga. It made an immediate return, winning the Bezirksliga in 2013.

== Honours ==
The club's honours:

- 2nd Oberliga Südwest (II)
  - Runners-up: 1955
- Verbandsliga Rheinland (V)
  - Champions: 2002
- Bezirksliga Rheinland-Ost (VII)
  - Champions: 2013
- Rhineland Cup
  - Champions: 2020, 2022, 2025

== Recent seasons ==
The recent season-by-season performance of the club:

Season	Division	Tier	Position
1999–2000	Landesliga Rheinland	VI	↑
2000–01	Verbandsliga Rheinland	V	8th
2001–02	Verbandsliga Rheinland	V	1st ↑
2002–03	Oberliga Südwest	IV	15th
2003–04	Oberliga Südwest	IV	11th
2004–05	Oberliga Südwest	IV	11th
2005–06	Oberliga Südwest	IV	12th
2006–07	Oberliga Südwest	IV	9th
2007–08	Oberliga Südwest	IV	18th ↓
2008–09	Rheinlandliga	VI	7th
2009–10	Rheinlandliga	VI	8th
2010–11	Rheinlandliga	VI	10th
2011–12	Rheinlandliga	VI	16th ↓
2012–13	Bezirksliga Rheinland-Ost	VII	1st ↑
2013–14	Rheinlandliga	VI	9th
2014–15	Rheinlandliga	VI	7th
2015–16	Rheinlandliga	VI	6th
2016–17	Rheinlandliga	VI	

- With the introduction of the Regionalligas in 1994 and the 3. Liga in 2008 as the new third tier, below the 2. Bundesliga, all leagues below dropped one tier. In 2012 the Oberliga Südwest was renamed Oberliga Rheinland-Pfalz/Saar.

↑ Promoted	↓ Relegated
