= SG 99 Andernach =

German football club

- Full name: Sportgemeinschaft 99 Andernach e.V.
- Founded: 1999
- Ground: Stadion Bassenheimer Weg
- Chairman: Hans Schellenbach
- League: 2. Frauen-Bundesliga
- 2025–26: 2. Bundesliga, 6th of 14
Home colours	Away colours

SG 99 Andernach is a German football club from the city of Andernach, Rhineland-Palatinate. The club was formed in 1999 through the merger of the football departments of SpVgg Andernach, BSV 1910 Andernach, and DJK Boulla Andernach based in the earlier association between these sides going back to 1992. SpVgg was the best known of these predecessor sides, having taken part in the first division play in the Gauliga Mittelrhein and Gauliga Moselland under the Third Reich and in the Fußball-Oberliga Rheinland-Pfalz/Saar after World War II.

== History ==
=== SpVgg Andernach ===
Spiel- und Sportverein Andernach was established on 30 January 1910. Later that year SuS was joined by Fußball-Club Preußen 1906 Andernach – believed to be the city's first organized football club – and in 1911 by Gymnasial Fußball Klub 1908 Andernach. The team captured its first city title in 1916. The club continued to grow through the 1920s, merging with Sport Club Eintracht 1921 Andernach in 1921 and with FC Rhenania 1910 Andernach on 13 September 1922 to become Spiel- und Sportvereinigung 1867 Andernach.

In 1933 German football was reorganized under the Third Reich into 16 top flight regional divisions known as Gauligen. SpVgg finished atop the Bezirksliga Mittelrhein, Gruppe 5 in 1936 and then won a promotion playoff to advance to the Gauliga Mittelrhein, but spent only a single season there before being sent down after an 11th-place finish. They had a successful Bezirksliga campaign in 1937–38, but failed in their attempt to return to Gauliga play when they finished second in the subsequent playoff round.

On 11 December 1938, SpVgg was joined by Turnerbund 1867 Andernach to become SpVgg 1867 Andernach. They won their way back to first division play in 1939 and earned consecutive third-place results in 1942 and 1943. However, they withdrew from play because they were unable to field a full side under wartime conditions.

Following the war occupying Allied authorities ordered the dissolution of most organizations in the country, including sports and football clubs. The former membership of SpVgg was reorganized as Sportclub 1945 Andernach on 14 September 1945 before resuming their pre-war identity on 26 July 1947. They became part of the Oberliga Südwest-Nord (I) in the 1947–48 season.

In March 1950 the club broke up into the pre-war sides SpVgg 1910 Andernach and Turnerbund 1867 Andernach. SpVgg played one more season in the Oberliga before they were relegated to the 2nd Oberliga Südwest (II). They played second division football throughout the 1950s and into the early 1960s with exception of a two-year turn back in the Oberliga in 1955–57. In 1961 they finished in 15th place and slipped into the Amateurliga Rheinland (III).

SpVgg fielded strong sides in the Amateurliga and captured titles there in 1971 and 1973. They were able to advance through the subsequent promotion round playoffs to the Regionalliga Südwest (II) only once, in 1971. Their 1971–72 Regionalliga campaign was a failure and after a 16th-place finish they were returned to the Amateurliga where they most of the next three decades.

The footballers captured the Rheinland-Pokal (Rheinland Cup) in 1964 by beating TuS Mayen (3:2) and again in 1973 with a 2:0 victory over VfB Wissen. In 1976 and 1977, SpVgg took part in the opening round of the DFB-Pokal (German Cup) tournament.

=== DJK Andernach ===
Predecessor side DJK was established in 1920 as part of the Deutscher Jugend Kraft, a Catholic-sponsored sports association. In 1933, the Nazi regime banned clubs with religious affiliations, as well as left-leaning worker's clubs, as politically unpalatable. The club did not reappear until 1952. In 1971 they appended the name of their primary sponsor to name of the club to play as DJK Boullo Andernach.

=== SG Andernach ===
The new club, formed in 1999, played in the tier seven Bezirksliga Rheinland-Mitte after a championship in the Kreisliga A Rhein-Ahr in 2010–11, in which the club remained undefeated, until promoted to the Rheinlandliga in 2015.

== Squad ==
As of 12 July 2026

Note: Flags indicate national team as defined under FIFA eligibility rules; some limited exceptions apply. Players may hold more than one non-FIFA nationality.

No.	Pos.	Nation	Player
1	GK	GER	Elena Bläser
5	MF	GER	Kathrin Schermuly
7	FW	GER	Carolin Schraa
9	MF	GER	Paula Petri
12	FW	GER	Leonie Krump
13	MF	GER	Marlene Ganßer
14	DF	GER	Mia Trombin
15	MF	GER	Vanessa Zilligen
17	FW	GER	Leonie Wäschenbach
18	FW	BEL	Daria Collas
19	GK	GER	Victoria Prassel
20	FW	KOS	Rinesa Alija
21	FW	GER	Isabel Pfeiffer

No.	Pos.	Nation	Player
22	MF	GER	Zoé Brückel
23	DF	GER	Magdalena Schumacher (Captain)
25	GK	GER	Lisa Krupp
27	MF	GER	Malou Müller
29	FW	GER	Zahara Wehbrink
31	MF	GER	Muriel Bey
33	DF	GER	Debora Vinci
—	DF	GER	Emelie Hesselbach
—	DF	KOS	Laureta Crnaveri
—	MF	GER	Nele Gärtner
—	MF	MAR	Narjiss Ahamad
—	FW	GER	Ina Keller

== Honours ==
The club's honours:

=== League ===
- Bezirksliga Mittelrhein
  - Champions: 1936, 1937, 1938
- 2nd Oberliga Südwest (II)
  - Champions: 1955
- Amateurliga Rheinland (III)
  - Champions: 1971, 1973
- Kreisliga A Rhein-Ahr
  - Champions: 2011

=== Cup ===
- Rhineland Cup
  - Winners: 1964, 1973
