= VfB Wissen =

German football club

- Full name: Verein für Bewegungsspiele Wissen 1914 e.V.
- Founded: 28 February 1914
- Ground: Dr.-Grosse-Siegstadion
- Capacity: 8,000
- Chairman: Thomas Nauroth
- Manager: Wolfgang Leidig
- League: Bezirksliga Rheinland-Ost (VII)
- 2015–16: 6th
Home colours	Away colours

The VfB Wissen is a German association football club from the town of Wissen, Rhineland-Palatinate.

The club's greatest success has been a single season spent in the tier two 2. Oberliga Südwest in 1962–63 and to become a founding member of the tier three Regionalliga West/Südwest in 1994.

== History ==
The origins of an organised sports club in Wissen goes back to 1889 when the TV Wissen was formed, a gymnastics club. Attempts to form a football department within this club failed because of the club rejecting football as a suitable sport for young men. Attempts were made to form an independent football club in 1910 but this club soon folded again. With the industrialisation of Wissen and the considerable growth of the town just before the First World War a football club was finally formed on 28 February 1914.

The war soon interrupted regular play and it took until 1919 for VfB to renter league football. The club was grouped in the B-Klasse of the Westphalia region but won the league and entered the A-Klasse from the next season. The club was able to maintain a football team well into the last year of the Second World War.

The club reformed in 1946 with the permission of the French occupation authorities but had to official disband and reform again the following year. The club was now grouped in the part of Rhineland region that would later become the German state of Rhineland-Palatinate rather than in Westphalia.

VfB Wissen was promoted to the Rheinlandliga, then the Amateurliga Rheinland, in 1956. The club played in the eastern division of the league, then split into two regional groups and won the league in 1961 and 1962. While it failed to win the Rhineland championship in 1961 it did so in 1962 and was promoted to the tier two 2. Oberliga Südwest. Wissen finished in sixth place but the introduction of the Bundesliga in 1963 and the changes in the league system meant that the club had to drop back to the Amateurliga. The club also won the Rhineland Cup on two occasions in this era, in 1959 and 1961.

VfB played two more seasons in the Rheinlandliga, now organised in a single division before being relegated in 1965. It returned to this level in 1968 and finished runners-up in the league in 1972. The club remained in the league until 1978 when it was renamed to Verbandsliga Rheinland. In the same year the Oberliga Südwest was established as the third tier in the region but Wissen needed to qualify in sixth place to enter this new league and came only thirteenth.

VfB Wissen became a top side in the Verbandsliga, finishing runners-up in 1981. It twice qualified for the first round of the German Cup in the early 1980s. In the 1980–81 edition it defeated ASV Burglengenfeld in the first round before going out to VfL Osnabrück in the second. In 1982–83 it lost to Borussia Mönchengladbach in the first round.

After 21 consecutive seasons in the Amateurliga/Verbandsliga the club finally won the Rheinlandliga in 1988 and was promoted to the Oberliga Südwest for the 1988–89 season, where the club finished sixteenth and was promptly relegated again. It took VfB two seasons to return to the Oberliga. It spent three seasons in the league from 1991 to 1994. After an eleventh place in 1992 it came fourth in 1993 and third in 1994. The later result was enough to be one of six teams from the league to qualify for the new Regionalliga West/Südwest, one of four Regionalligas introduced that year. VfB Wissen came last in this league in 1994–95 and was relegated from the Regionalliga again. The following season, in the Oberliga, the club came last again and was relegated from this league, too. The Regionalliga West/Südwest disbanded in 2000 and the Oberliga Südwest renamed in 2012 and VfB did not return to either in this time.

VfB Wissen lasted for two seasons in the Rheinlandliga before suffering another relegation in 1998, after 31 seasons at this level or above. It played in the Landesliga after that, with this league eventually disbanded and replaced by the Bezirksliga at its level. Since then the club has dropped as far as the Kreisliga A before making a return to the Bezirksliga in 2014.

== Honours ==
The club's honours:

- Rheinlandliga (III/IV)
  - Champions: 1962, 1988, 1991
  - Runners-up: 1961, 1972, 1981
- Kreisliga A Sieg
  - Champions: 2014
  - Runners-up: 2012, 2013
- Rhineland Cup (Tiers III-VII)
  - Winners: 1959, 1961
  - Runners-up: 1973, 1982

== Recent seasons ==
The recent season-by-season performance of the club:

Season	Division	Tier	Position
1999–2000	Landesliga Nord	VI	2nd
2000–01	Landesliga Nord	VI	7th
2001–02	Landesliga Nord	VI	10th
2002–03	Landesliga Nord	VI	3rd
2003–04	Bezirksliga Ost	VI	2nd
2004–05	Bezirksliga Ost	VI	5th
2005–06	Bezirksliga Ost	VI	11th
2006–07	Bezirksliga Ost	VI	10th
2007–08	Bezirksliga Ost	VI	16th ↓
2008–09	Kreisliga A	VIII	8th
2009–10	Kreisliga A	VIII	3rd
2010–11	Kreisliga A	VIII	3rd
2011–12	Kreisliga A	VIII	2nd
2012–13	Kreisliga A	VIII	2nd
2013–14	Kreisliga A	VIII	1st ↑
2014–15	Bezirksliga Ost	VII	6th
2015–16	Bezirksliga Ost	VII	6th
2016–17	Bezirksliga Ost	VII	

- With the introduction of the Regionalligas in 1994 and the 3. Liga in 2008 as the new third tier, below the 2. Bundesliga, all leagues below dropped one tier.

=== Key ===
↑ Promoted	↓ Relegated
