= TuS Mayen =

German football club

Tus Mayen
- Full name: Turn- und Sport Mayen
- Founded: 1886/1914
- Ground: Nettetal-Stadion
- Chairman: Josef Brodam
- Manager: Tobias Uhrmacher
- League: Rheinlandliga (VI)
- 2015–16: 4th
Home colours	Away colours

Tus Mayen is a German association football club from the city of Mayen, Rhineland-Palatinate. It is part of a larger sports club that also includes departments for athletics, basketball, dance, field hockey, gymnastics, handball, swimming, and tennis.

== History ==
The club acknowledges two predecessor sides. It claims a heritage that goes back to the formation of the gymnastics club Turnverein Mayen on 23 September 1886. In 1939, this club merged with Sportverein Rheinland Mayen, which was established in 1914, to form Turn- und Sportverein Mayen 1886/1914.

Following World War II, occupying Allied authorities ordered the dissolution of most organizations in the country, including sports and football clubs. The association was re-established in January 1946, but, not allowed its old identity by authorities, was known briefly as Tennis- und Sportverein Mayen, then 1. Sport-Club Mayen, before finally being able to reassume its traditional name.

In the 1963 restructuring of the German football competition, TuS qualified to play in the Amateurliga Rheinland (III) where they earned lower table results before finally being relegated in 1969. They returned to Amateurliga play in 1973 where they continued to earn indifferent results. However, they did enjoy some success in regional cup play, qualifying to take part in the DFB-Pokal (German Cup) tournament in 1974, 1975, and 1976, but going out in the opening round in each of these appearances.

Mayen failed to make the cut in another league reorganization in 1978 and remained in the Amateurliga Rheinland which was now a fifth tier circuit. The footballers won promotion to the Oberliga Südwest (IV) in 1980 as champions of the Rheinlandliga and over the next two decades played as an "elevator side", moving frequently up and down between the fourth and fifth divisions. TuS last won promotion to the Oberliga Südwest (IV) in 2001 and have played there since, with their best result coming as a sixth-place finish in 2003. In 2004 the club made its fourth German Cup appearance on the strength of a regional cup win, but again exited in the first round.

The association suffered through a financial crisis in the early 90s, but recovered itself, and in 2004 underwent a restructuring to help avoid similar problems in future. The current membership is approximately 2,900 in nine sports departments.

The club suffered relegation from the Oberliga in 2010 and has been playing in the tier six Rheinlandliga since.

== Honours ==
The club's honours:

=== League ===
- Verbandsliga Rheinland (V)
  - Champions: 1980, 1984, 1989, 1999

=== Cup ===
- Rhineland Cup
  - Winners: 1966, 1974, 1976, 2004

== Recent seasons ==
The recent season-by-season performance of the club:

Season	Division	Tier	Position
1999–2000	Oberliga Südwest	IV	15th ↓
2000–01	Verbandsliga Rheinland	V	1st ↑
2001–02	Oberliga Südwest	IV	12th
2002–03	Oberliga Südwest	IV	6th
2003–04	Oberliga Südwest	IV	9th
2004–05	Oberliga Südwest	IV	12th
2005–06	Oberliga Südwest	IV	11th
2006–07	Oberliga Südwest	IV	11th
2007–08	Oberliga Südwest	IV	13th
2008–09	Oberliga Südwest	V	12th
2009–10	Oberliga Südwest	V	17th ↓
2010–11	Rheinlandliga	VI	12th
2011–12	Rheinlandliga	VI	8th
2012–13	Rheinlandliga	VI	5th
2013–14	Rheinlandliga	VI	11th
2014–15	Rheinlandliga	VI	9th
2015–16	Rheinlandliga	VI	4th
2016–17	Rheinlandliga	VI	

- With the introduction of the Regionalligas in 1994 and the 3. Liga in 2008 as the new third tier, below the 2. Bundesliga, all leagues below dropped one tier. In 2012 the Oberliga Südwest was renamed Oberliga Rheinland-Pfalz/Saar.

↑ Promoted	↓ Relegated

== Stadium ==
TuS Mayen plays its home matches in the Nettetal-Stadion which has a capacity of 5,000. A record crowd of 6,500 attended the club's 2004 German Cup match versus VfB Stuttgart.
