= SpVgg Bendorf =

German football club

- Full name: Sportvereinigung 1921 e.V. Bendorf
- Founded: 1911
- Ground: Rheinstadion
- League: Kreisliga A Koblenz (VII)
- 2015–16: 5th
Home colours	Away colours

SpVgg Bendorf is a German association football club from the town of Bendorf, Rhineland-Palatinate. The club first came to note as a second division side in the various Amateurliga Rheinland leagues in place after World War II.

== History ==
SpVgg became part of the Amateurliga Rheinland-Mitte in 1950 and captured the division title there in 1952. They won a second title the following season in the Amateurliga Rheinland and spent seven of the next ten seasons in Amateurliga competition generally earning upper table results.

Following the formation of the new first division Bundesliga in 1963, Bendorf would spend another dozen seasons in the now third tier Amateurliga Rheinland. A championship season in 1964–65 led to their participation in the promotion round playoff for the Regionalliga Südwest (II) where they finished second to Germania Metternich and so failed to advance.

After a second-place finish in 1970, the team took part in the opening round of the German national amateur championship where they were eliminated by FV Eppelborn (2:1, 2:2). In 1975 slipped from third division play following a 15th-place finish.

The club now plays in the tier seven Kreisliga A Koblenz.

== Honours ==
- Amateurliga Rheinland-Mitte
  - Champions: 1952
- Amateurliga Rheinland
  - Champions: 1953, 1965
