= Amateurliga Rheinland =

- Founded: 1952
- Folded: 1978 (26 seasons)
- Replaced by: Oberliga Südwest (III); Verbandsliga Rheinland (IV)
- Country: West Germany
- State: Rhineland-Palatinate
- Region: Rhineland
- Level on pyramid: Level 3
- Promotion to: 2. Oberliga Südwest 1952–63; Regionalliga Südwest 1963–74; 2. Bundesliga Süd 1974–78
- Domestic cup(s): Rheinland Pokal
- Last champions: TuS Neuendorf (1977–78)

The Amateurliga Rheinland was the highest football league in the region of the Rheinland Football Association and the third tier of the German football league system from its inception in 1952 to the formation of the Oberliga Südwest and the Verbandsliga Rheinland below it in 1978.

== Overview ==
The Amateurliga Rheinland was formed in 1952 in the northern half of the state of Rhineland-Palatinate. Before its inception, three separate leagues operated in the area as the highest level of play. The league was a feeder league to the 2. Oberliga Südwest. From 1952 until the establishment of the Oberliga Südwest in 1978, it was the third tier of the football league system.

The winner of the Amateurliga Rheinland was not automatically promoted to its superior league but rather had to take part in a promotion play-off. The champion would have to compete with the winners of the Amateurligas Saarland and Südwest.

Until 1933, the region covered by the Rheinland FA was politically part of the now dissolved German state of Prussia. It was part of the Prussian Rhine Province.

The league was established in 1952 with sixteen teams, the winner gaining promotion to the 2. Oberliga Südwest. The founder members were:

- SpVgg Bendorf
- FC Urbar
- VfL Trier
- SpVgg Neuwied
- SC Wirges
- SV Niederlahnstein
- SV Ehrang
- Germania Mudersbach
- TuS Konz
- SSV Heimbach-Weis
- SpVgg Zewen
- VfB Lützel
- SV Remagen
- TuS Mayen
- SV Trier-West
- SG Betzdorf

In 1956 the league was split into a western and an eastern group with twelve teams each. In 1963 it reverted to its old single group setup.

With the introduction of the Bundesliga in 1963 the Amateurliga was placed below the new Regionalliga Südwest but still retained its third-tier status. It continued to do so after the introduction of the 2. Bundesliga Süd in 1974.

The SC Bad Neuenahr and SC Sinzig hold the record for years in the league, each with 22 out of a possible 26.

== Disbanding of the Amateurliga Rheinland ==
In 1978, the Oberliga Südwest was formed to allow direct promotion to the 2nd Bundesliga Süd for the Amateure champion of the area. The teams placed one to five gained entry to the Oberliga while the next ten teams were put into the new Verbandsliga Rheinland, now the fourth tier of the football league system. The bottom team was relegated to the Bezirksliga.

Admitted to the new Oberliga:

- TuS Neuendorf
- FSV Salmrohr
- SpVgg EGC Wirges
- Eisbachtaler Sportfreunde
- SV Ellingen

Relegated to the new Verbandsliga:

- SV Leiwen
- VfL Neuwied
- SV Remagen
- SC Bad Neuenahr
- FC Bitburg
- TuS Mayen
- Alemannia Plaidt
- VfB Wissen
- SC Sinzig
- TuS Hahnstetten

Relegated to the Bezirksliga:

- Eintracht Höhr

== Winners of the Amateurliga Rheinland ==
**Season**	**Club**
1952–53	**SpVgg Bendorf**
1953–54	VfL Trier
1954–55	**VfL Trier**
1955–56	**SV Niederlahnstein**
1956–57	**FC Germania Metternich**
1957–58	Spfr. Herdorf
1958–59	FC Germania Metternich
1959–60	**FC Germania Metternich**
1960–61	SV Ehrang
1961–62	**VfB Wissen**
1962–63	VfL Neuwied
1963–64	**FC Germania Metternich**
1964–65	SpVgg Bendorf
1965–66	**FC Germania Metternich**
1966–67	**SSV Mülheim**
1967–68	SC Sinzig
1968–69	SSV Mülheim
1969–70	VfL Neuwied
1970–71	**SpVgg Andernach**
1971–72	**Eisbachtaler Sportfreunde**
1972–73	SpVgg Andernach
1973–74	SV Leiwen
1974–75	Eintracht Trier
1975–76	**Eintracht Trier**
1976–77	TuS Neuendorf
1977–78	TuS Neuendorf

Source:"Alle Rheinlandmeister". Rhineland football association. Archived from the original on 2 October 2011.

- **Bold** denotes team gained promotion.
- The TuS Neuendorf, winner of the last two league titles, changed its name to TuS Koblenz in 1982.
