= Rhineland Football Association =

- Fußballverband Rheinland
- Abbreviation: FVR
- Formation: 11 June 1949
- Type: Football association
- Headquarters: Lortzingstrasse 3
- Location: Koblenz, Rhineland-Palatinate
- Members: 182,416 (2017)
- President: Walter Desch
- Parent organization: German Football Association
- Website: www.fv-rheinland.de

The Rhineland Football Association (German: Fußballverband Rheinland), the FVR, is one of 21 state organisations of the German Football Association, the DFB, and covers the northern part of the state of Rhineland-Palatinate.

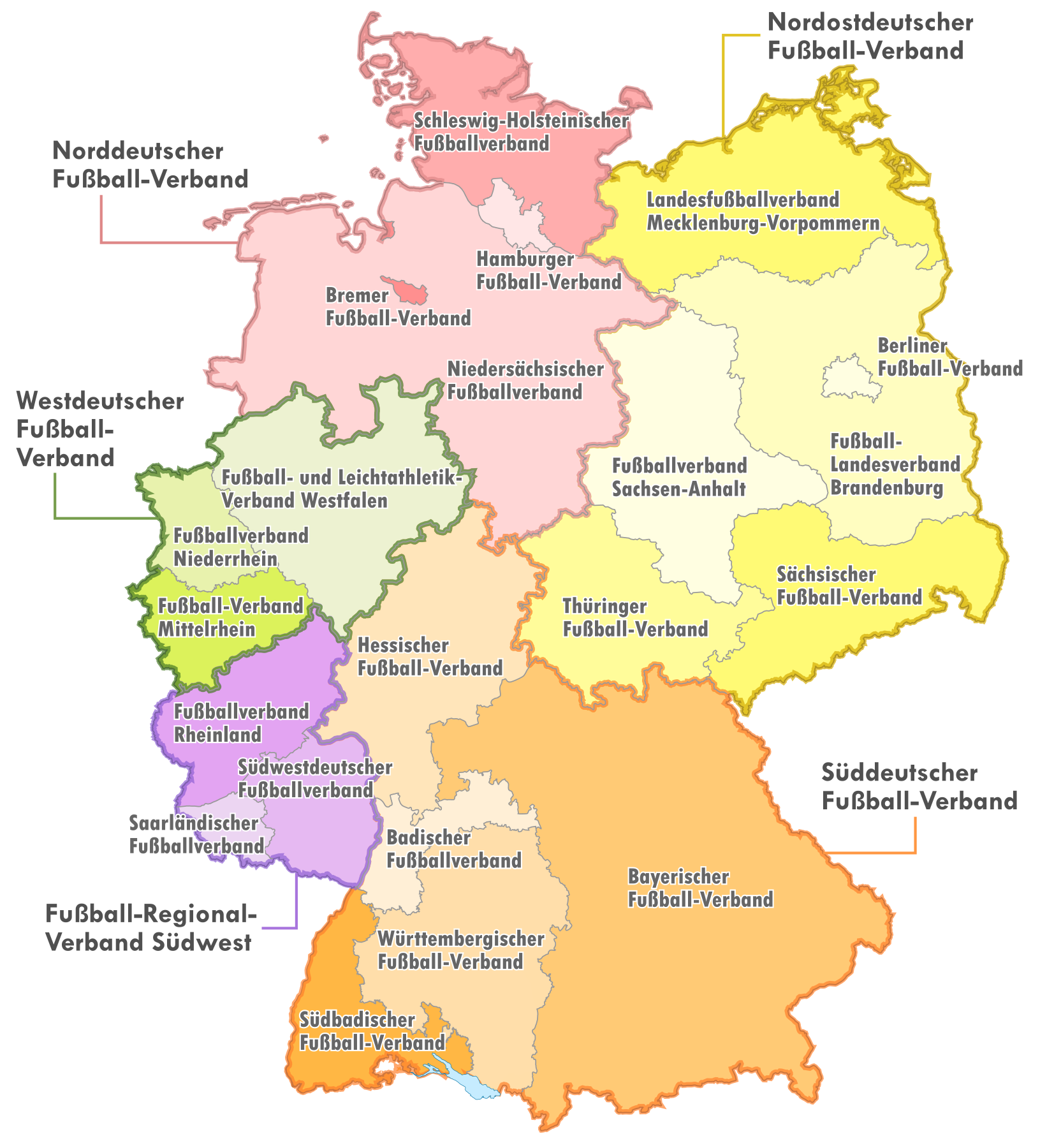
DFB, its five regional and 21 state associations

The FVR is also part of the Southwestern Regional Football Association, one of five regional federations in Germany. The other member of the regional association are the Southwest German Football Association and the Saarland Football Association.

In 2017, the FVR had 182,416 members, 1,049 member clubs and 3,849 teams playing in its league system.
