= List of clubs in the Oberliga Rheinland-Pfalz/Saar =

This is a List of clubs in the Oberliga Rheinland-Pfalz/Saar, including all clubs and their final placings from the inaugural season 1978–79, then under the name of Amateur-Oberliga Südwest, to the current one. The league, is the highest football league in the states of Rhineland-Palatinate (German: Rheinland-Pfalz) and Saarland. It is one of fourteen Oberligas in German football, the fifth tier of the German football league system. Until the introduction of the 3. Liga in 2008 it was the fourth tier of the league system, until the introduction of the Regionalligas in 1994 the third tier.

== Overview ==
The league was formed in 1978 to replace the three regional amateur leagues that existed in its place until then as the third tier in Rhineland-Platinate and Saarland. Originally it carried the name Amateur-Oberliga Südwest. In 1994, when the Regionalliga Süd was formed, the league changed its official name once more to Oberliga Südwest, and became a tier four league. In 2012, the Regionalliga Süd was replaced by the Regionalliga Südwest and the league was renamed Oberliga Rheinland-Pfalz/Saar to avoid confusion, but little else changed for the Oberliga otherwise.

=== League timeline ===
The league went through the following timeline of name changes, format and position in the league system:

Years	Name	Tier	Promotion to
1978–81	Amateur-Oberliga Südwest	III	2. Bundesliga Süd
1981–94	Amateur-Oberliga Südwest	III	2. Bundesliga
1994–2000	Oberliga Südwest	IV	Regionalliga West/Südwest
2000–08	Oberliga Südwest	IV	Regionalliga Süd
2008–12	Oberliga Südwest	V	Regionalliga West
2012–	Oberliga Rheinland-Pfalz/Saar	V	Regionalliga Südwest

== List of clubs ==
This is a complete list of clubs, as of the 2022–23 season, sorted by the last season a club played in the league:

Club	No	First	Last	Best	Titles	Seasons
FK Pirmasens	30	1978–79	present	1st	2	2005-06, 2013–14
Eisbachtaler Sportfreunde	26	1978–79	present	2nd	—	—
1. FC Kaiserslautern II	23	1978–79	present	1st	3	1994-95, 1996–97, 2000–01
TuS Koblenz	18	1978–79	present	1st	2	2003-04, 2015–16
SV Auersmacher	6	1978–79	present	5th	—	—
TSG Pfeddersheim	17	1992–93	present	3rd	—	—
FV Engers 07	11	2002–03	present	5th	—	—
TuS Mechtersheim	16	2004–05	present	6th	—	—
SV Elversberg II	11	2008–09	present	3rd	—	—
SV Alemannia Waldalgesheim	7	2008–09	present	8th	—	—
SV Gonsenheim	11	2010–11	present	4th	—	—
Arminia Ludwigshafen	10	2011–12	present	4th	—	—
FC Hertha Wiesbach	9	2013–14	present	3rd	—	—
FV Diefflen	8	2014–15	present	5th	—	—
TSV Schott Mainz	5	2014–15	present	1st	2	2016–17, 2019–20
FC Karbach	7	2015–16	present	3rd	—	—
FSV Jägersburg	6	2015–16	present	6th	—	—
SV Morlautern	2	2016–17	present	12th	—	—
FV Dudenhofen	4	2017–18	present	5th	—	—
SG 2000 Mülheim-Karlich	2	2020–21	present	17th	—	—
Ahrweiler BC	0+	2022–23	present	—	—	—
TuS Kirchberg	0+	2022–23	present	—	—	—
BFV Hassia Bingen	27	1978–79	2021–22	4th	—	—
SV Röchling Völklingen^{2}	15	1978–79	2021–22	1st	1	1978-79
Eintracht Trier	20	1981–82	2021–22	1st	3	1986-87, 1992–93, 1993–94
Wormatia Worms	24	1982–83	2021–22	1st	2	1985-86, 2021–22
FSV Salmrohr	28	1978–79	2021–22	1st	2	1984-85, 1991–92
FV Eppelborn	3	2017–18	2021–22	19th	—	—
TSV Emmelshausen	3	2018–19	2021–22	16th	—	—
FC Speyer 09	2	2020–21	2021–22	—	—	—
VfB Dillingen	4	1978–79	2018–19	14th	—	—
SC Idar-Oberstein	17	1995–96	2018–19	1st	2	1998-99, 2010–11
TuS Rot-Weiß Koblenz	3	2016–17	2018–19	1st	1	2018–19
FC 08 Homburg	16	1981–82	2017–18	1st	5	1981-82, 1983–84, 2009–10, 2011–12, 2017–18
Saar 05 Saarbrücken	6	1990–91	2017–18	1st	1	2014–15
Borussia Neunkirchen	34	1979–80	2016–17	1st	5	1979-80, 1990–91, 1999-2000, 2001–02, 2004–05
SC Hauenstein	22	1990–91	2016–17	2nd	—	—
SpVgg Burgbrohl	4	2013–14	2016–17	10th	—	—
FK Pirmasens II	2	2015–16	2016–17	8th	—	—
SpVgg EGC Wirges	26	1978–79	2015–16	5th	—	—
SVN Zweibrücken	6	2008–09	2015–16	1st	1	2012–13
SV Mehring	3	2012–13	2015–16	13th	—	—
1. FC Saarbrücken II^{1}	22	1988–89	2014–15	4th	—	—
SG Betzdorf	14	1994–95	2014–15	3rd	—	—
SV Roßbach/Verscheid	7	2007–08	2013–14	8th	—	—
SC Halberg-Brebach	8	1997–98	2012–13	3rd	—	—
Sportfreunde Köllerbach	7	2003–04	2012–13	6th	—	—
Eintracht Trier II	3	2005–06	2011–12	10th	—	—
Rot-Weiss Hasborn	11	1981–82	2010–11	9th	—	—
SG Bad Breisig	2	2008–09	2010–11	17th	—	—
TuS Mayen	20	1980–81	2009–10	6th	—	—
1. FC Saarbrücken	4	1981–82	2008–09	1st	2	1982-83, 2008–09
SV Mettlach	9	1993–94	2008–09	3rd	—	—
Eintracht Bad Kreuznach	18	1978–79	2007–08	5th	—	—
FSV Mainz 05 II	7	1999–2000	2007–08	1st	2	2002-03, 2007–08
FSV Oggersheim	2	2005–06	2006–07	1st	1	2006-07
TuS Hohenecken	1	2006–07	2006–07	17th	—	—
SV Weingarten	4	2002–03	2005–06	2nd	—	—
SpVgg Ingelheim	4	2001–02	2004–05	9th	—	—
SV Klausen	1	2003–04	2003–04	18th	—	—
VfL Hamm	19	1982–83	2002–03	2nd	—	—
SV Prüm	7	1993–94	2000–01	11th	—	—
Germania Metternich	1	2000–01	2000–01	20th	—	—
TuS Montabaur	3	1997–98	1999–2000	9th	—	—
VfB Theley	1	1999–2000	1999–2000	18th	—	—
FSG Schiffweiler	9	1989–90	1998–99	8th	—	—
SV Elversberg	10	1980–81	1997–98	1st	2	1995-96, 1997–98
SSV Überherrn	4	1986–87	1997–98	13th	—	—
VfL Trier	3	1995–96	1997–98	6th	—	—
SV Wittlich	5	1992–93	1996–97	5th	—	—
RWO Alzey	1	1996–97	1996–97	17th	—	—
Südwest Ludwigshafen	18	1978–79	1995–96	2nd	—	—
SV Edenkoben	8	1986–87	1995–96	1st	1	1988-89
VfB Wissen	5	1988–89	1995–96	3rd	—	—
FSV Saarwellingen	11	1978–79	1994–95	6th	—	—
FC Homburg II	3	1991–92	1993–94	14th	—	—
Viktoria Herxheim	6	1979–80	1992–93	13th	—	—
SV Geinsheim	4	1989–90	1992–93	11th	—	—
FSV Mainz 05	12	1978–79	1989–90	1st	3	1980-81, 1987–88, 1989–90
SV Leiwen	9	1979–80	1989–90	13th	—	—
SC Birkenfeld	6	1984–85	1989–90	3rd	—	—
ASC Dudweiler	9	1978–79	1986–87	5th	—	—
FK Clausen	4	1981–82	1986–87	11th	—	—
FC St. Wendel	6	1978–79	1984–85	4th	—	—
FC Ensdorf	5	1979–80	1984–85	11th	—	—
VfL Neustadt	1	1982–83	1982–83	18th	—	—
TuS Landstuhl	1	1980–81	1980–81	16th	—	—
SV Ellingen	2	1978–79	1979–80	15th	—	—
SV Speicher	1	1978–79	1978–79	18th	—	—

=== Key ===
Denotes club playing in a league above the Oberliga Rheinland-Pfalz/Saar in 2022–23.	Denotes club playing in the Oberliga Rheinland-Pfalz/Saar in 2022–23.	Denotes club playing in a league below the Oberliga Rheinland-Pfalz/Saar in 2022–23.

Club	Name of club
No	Number of seasons in league
First	First season in league
Last	Last season in league
Best	Best result in league
Titles	Number of league titles won
Seasons	Seasons league titles were won in

=== Notes ===
- ^{1} 1. FC Saarbrücken II was withdrawn from league football at the end of the 2014–15 season.
- ^{2} Röchling Völklingen withdrew from league football during the 2021–22 season.

== League placings ==
The complete list of clubs in the league and their league placings.

=== Amateur-Oberliga Südwest ===
The complete list of clubs and placings in the league while operating as the tier three Amateur-Oberliga Südwest from 1978 to 1994:

Club	79	80	81	82	83	84	85	86	87	88	89	90	91	92	93	94
1. FC Saarbrücken	2B	2B	2B	3	1	2B	2B	B	2B	2B	2B	2B	2B	2B	B	2B
FC Homburg	2B	2B	2B	1	3	1	2B	2B	B	B	2B	B	2B	2B	2B	2B
FSV Mainz 05	3	5	1	2	8	8	2	5	5	1	2B	1	2B	2B	2B	2B
Eintracht Trier	2B	2B	2B	6	6	2	3	3	1	2	2	5	2	3	1	1
SV Edenkoben									17		1	7	5	5	5	2
VfB Wissen											16			11	4	3
Borussia Neunkirchen	2B	1	2B	11	9	12	11	7	10	14	8	3	1	4	6	4
SC Hauenstein													18			5
FSV Salmrohr	9	7	6	5	4	3	1	2	2B	6	5	2	3	1	2	6
TSG Pfeddersheim															7	7
1. FC Saarbrücken II											11	12	7	10	8	8
SV Wittlich															12	9
VfL Hamm					20			6	3	7	6	13	12	7	14	10
FSV Saarwellingen	17							14	7	9	13	10	6	9	9	11
Eisbachtaler Sportfreunde	10	10	3	14	10	15	8	17					15	12	3	12
Südwest Ludwigshafen	5	4	2	10	14	9	13	12	12	12	7	8	4	2	10	13
FSG Schiffweiler												15	17		11	14
SV Mettlach																15
SV Prüm																16
TuS Mayen			14	21			14	18				11	13	8	13	17
FC Homburg II														14	15	18
Viktoria Herxheim		15	18							16	18			13	16	
VfR Wormatia Worms	2B	2B	2B	2B	15	6	4	1	2	5	3	6	14	6	17	
SV Geinsheim												14	11	15	18	
1. FC Kaiserslautern II	8	2	10	17		10	12	9	9	4	9	16	8	16		
FK Pirmasens	2	3	4	4	2	5	6	10	6	8	4	4	9	17		
Saar 05 Saarbrücken													10	18		
BFV Hassia Bingen	6	14	9	8	5	4	10	8	8	11	10	9	16			
SV Leiwen		16		15	16	16	18		14	13	14	17				
SC Birkenfeld							7	4	4	3	12	18				
SpVgg EGC Wirges	13	13	7	19		18				10	15					
Rot-Weiss Hasborn				20						15	17					
Eintracht Bad Kreuznach	7	11	5	7	7	14	9	13	11	17						
SSV Überherrn									13	18						
FK Clausen				16	17			11	15							
ASC Dudweiler	11	9	12	12	13	11	5	16	16							
SV Elversberg			8	9	11	7	15	15	18							
FC Ensdorf		12	11	13	19		16									
FC St. Wendel	4	6	15		12	13	17									
SV Röchling Völklingen	1	2B	13	18		17										
VfL Neustadt					18											
TuS Landstuhl			16													
TuS Koblenz	12	8	17													
VfB Dillingen	14	17														
SV Ellingen	15	18														
SV Auersmacher	16															
SV Speicher	18															

=== Oberliga Südwest ===
The complete list of clubs and placings in the league while operating as the tier four (1994–2008) and five (2008–2012) Oberliga Südwest:

Club	95	96	97	98	99	00	01	02	03	04	05	06	07	08	09	10	11	12
1. FC Saarbrücken	2B	R	R	R	R	R	2B	2B	R	R	2B	2B	R	5	1	R	3L	3L
FSV Mainz 05 II						4	7	2	1	R	R	3	2	1	R	R	R	R
SV Elversberg	14	1	R	1	R	R	R	R	R	R	R	R	R	R	R	R	R	R
TuS Koblenz	3	2	11	10	14	9	9	11	11	1	R	R	2B	2B	2B	2B	3L	R
1. FC Kaiserslautern II	1	R	1	R	R	R	1	R	R	R	2	R	R	2	R	R	R	R
Eintracht Trier	R	R	R	R	R	R	R	R	2B	2B	2B	R	5	4	R	R	R	R
VfR Wormatia Worms					12	7	16	15	3	3	8	4	3	3	R	R	R	R
SC Idar-Oberstein		11	2	5	1	R	14	4	4	15	17			11	5	4	1	R
FC Homburg	2B	R	R	R	R	3	4	9	12	4	4	2	4	7	2	1	R	1
SVN Zweibrücken															13	3	5	2
FK Pirmasens				8	2	R	8	7	13	12	10	1	R	10	3	2	2	3
Arminia Ludwigshafen																		4
SC Hauenstein	R	R	R	7	8	8	13	10	2	8	3	8	8	9	11	9	4	5
FSV Salmrohr	R	R	R	R	R	R	5	3	5	16			15					6
Borussia Neunkirchen	R	R	7	6	3	1	3	1	R	10	1	9	10	6	4	12	7	7
SV Gonsenheim																	15	8
1. FC Saarbrücken II	7	9	15		5	11	17		14	5	6	5	6				14	9
SpVgg EGC Wirges	12	16			7	5	6	5	8	7	15	10	7	8	6	16	11	10
TuS Mechtersheim											13	13	14	14	10	6	8	11
SV Elversberg II															16	10	9	12
SV Röchling Völklingen									17									13
SG Betzdorf	10	14			10	16					14	16	16		7	13	3	14
SV Roßbach/Verscheid														12	8	14	13	15
Sportfreunde Köllerbach										17				15	13	11	6	16
SV Alemannia Waldalgesheim															15	8	12	17
Eintracht Trier II												14					10	18
Rot-Weiß Hasborn						12	18					15	12	16	9	15	16	
SG Bad Breisig															17		17	
SV Auersmacher		6	10	16												5	18	
Eisbachtaler Sportfreunde	2	10	5	2	4	6	10	6	19							7	19	
TuS Mayen	18					15		12	6	9	12	11	11	13	12	17		
BFV Hassia Bingen	9	4	9	15	16	13	19			13	9	17				18		
SV Mettlach	4	5	3	12	18		15	17							18			
FSV Oggersheim												6	1	R				
Eintracht Bad Kreuznach							11	16	10	6	7	7	13	17				
FV Engers 07									15	11	11	12	9	18				
TuS Hohenecken													17					
SV Weingarten									7	2	5	18						
SpVgg Ingelheim								14	9	14	16							
SC Halberg-Brebach				3	13	10	12	13	18		18							
SV Klausen										18								
VfL Hamm	11	7	4	4	6	2	2	8	16									
SV Saar 05 Saarbrücken								18										
Germania Metternich							20											
SV Prüm	16		13	13	11	14	21											
TSG Pfeddersheim	8	3	12	14	15	17												
VfB Theley						18												
TuS Montabaur				9	9	19												
FSG Schiffweiler	13	13	8	11	17													
SSV Überherrn			14	17														
VfL Trier		12	6	18														
SV Wittlich	5	8	16															
RWO Alzey			17															
SV Edenkoben	R	15																
Südwest Ludwigshafen	6	17																
VfB Wissen	R	18																
FSV Saarwellingen	15																	
VfB Dillingen	17																	

=== Oberliga Rheinland-Pfalz/Saar ===
The complete list of clubs and placings in the league while operating as the tier five Oberliga Rheinland-Pfalz/Saar (2012–present):

Club	13	14	15	16	17	18	19	20	22	23
FC 08 Homburg	R	R	R	R	R	1	R	R	R	R
FK Pirmasens	8	1	R	R	R	2	R	R	R	x
TuS/FC Rot-Weiß Koblenz					5	7	1	R	R	R
TSV Schott Mainz			6	13	1	R	7	1	R	x
Wormatia Worms	R	R	R	R	R	R	R	7	1	R
SV Eintracht Trier 05	R	R	R	R	R	4	6	5	2	R
Arminia Ludwigshafen	6	4	11	12	16		13	14	3	x
FC Hertha Wiesbach		8	10	5	3	8	10	13	4	x
FV Dudenhofen						14		6	5	x
FV Engers 07						13	5	11	6	x
SV Gonsenheim	14	9	4	11	9	15		8	7	x
SV Alemannia Waldalgesheim		17							8	x
FV Diefflen			16		10	5	14	9	9	x
FC Karbach				3	6	10	12	15	10	x
TuS Mechtersheim	7	13	15		4	9	8	16	11	x
TuS Koblenz	1	R	R	1	R	R	4	4	12	x
TSG Pfeddersheim	11	7	3	6	11	12	3	10	13	x
1. FC Kaiserslautern II	R	R	R	R	R	3	9	2	14	x
Eisbachtaler Sportfreunde								18	15	x
SV Elversberg II	15	5	9	16				3	16	x
SG 2000 Mülheim-Karlich									17	x
FSV Jägersburg				8	14	6	15		18	x
FSV Salmrohr	2	2	7	9	15	17			19	
FV Eppelborn						19			20	
BFV Hassia Bingen							11	17	21	
TSV Emmelshausen							16		22	
FC Speyer 09									23	
SV Röchling Völklingen	10	14	5	7	2	R	2	12	24	
SC Idar-Oberstein	R	6	14			11	17			
VfB Dillingen							18			
SV Morlautern					12	16				x
SV Saar 05 Saarbrücken			1	R	7	18				
FK Pirmasens II				15	8					
SC Hauenstein	3	3	2	2	13					
Borussia Neunkirchen	5	15	12	4	17					
SpVgg Burgbrohl		10	13	14	18					
SpVgg EGC Wirges	16		8	10						
SV Mehring	13	16		17						
SVN Zweibrücken	1	R	R	18						
1. FC Saarbrücken II	4	11	17							
SG Betzdorf	9	12	18							
SV Roßbach/Verscheid	12	18								
SC Halberg-Brebach	17									
Sportfreunde Köllerbach	18									
Ahrweiler BC										x
SV Auersmacher										x
TuS Kirchberg										x

Northern club	21
SV Eintracht Trier 05	1
1. FC Kaiserslautern II	2
BFV Hassia Bingen	3
Alemannia Waldalgesheim	4
TuS Koblenz	5
SV Gonsenheim	6
FV Engers 07	7
SG 2000 Mülheim-Karlich	8
FC Karbach	9
FSV Salmrohr	10
Spfr. Eisbachtal	11
TSV Emmelshausen	12

Southern club	21
Wormatia Worms	1
FV Dudenhofen	2
FV Diefflen	3
Arminia Ludwigshafen	4
FSV Jägersburg	5
SV Elversberg II	6
SV Röchling Völklingen	7
TSG Pfeddersheim	8
FC Hertha Wiesbach	9
FC Speyer 09	10
TuS Mechtersheim	11
FV Eppelborn	12

=== Key ===
Symbol	Key
B	Bundesliga (1963–present)
2B	2. Bundesliga (1974–present)
3L	3. Liga (2008–present)
R	Regionalliga West/Südwest (1994–2000); Regionalliga Süd (2000–2008); Regionalliga West (2008–2012); Regionalliga Südwest (2012–present)
1	League champions
Place	League
Blank	Played at a league level below this league
