= Yannick Bach =

German footballer

Personal information
- Full name: Yannick Bach
- Date of birth: 21 May 1991 (age 35)
- Place of birth: Germany
- Height: 1.79 m (5 ft 10 in)
- Position: Left midfielder

Team information
- Current team: Hertha Wiesbach
- Number: 21

Youth career
- –2007: SV Altstadt
- 2007–2010: 1. FC Saarbrücken

Senior career*
Years	Team	Apps	(Gls)
2010–2013	1. FC Saarbrücken II	44	(1)
2011–2013	1. FC Saarbrücken	24	(1)
2013–2014	1. FC Kaiserslautern II	15	(2)
2014–2015	SVN Zweibrücken	18	(0)
2015–2019	Borussia Neunkirchen	104	(12)
2019–	Hertha Wiesbach	29	(4)
- * Club domestic league appearances and goals as of 20 February 2021

Yannick Bach (born 21 May 1991) is a German footballer who plays as a midfielder for FC Hertha Wiesbach. He came through Saarbrücken's youth setup, and made his first-team debut in July 2011, when he replaced Kai Gehring in a 3. Fußball-Liga match against Chemnitzer FC.
