= Vinh Long Willemin =

French footballer (born 1982)

Personal information
- Full name: Vinh Long Harry Willemin
- Date of birth: 8 January 1982 (age 44)
- Place of birth: Bayonne, France
- Height: 1.83 m (6 ft 0 in)
- Position: Defender

Youth career
- Metz

Senior career*
Years	Team	Apps	(Gls)
2000–2003	Metz	2	(0)
2002	Metz B		
2003	Louhans-Cuiseaux		
2004	1. FC Saarbrücken II	24	(3)
2004–2005	1. FC Saarbrücken	3	(0)
2006	SC Hauenstein	8	(2)
2006	Ancona	0	(0)
2007	Viterbese	3	(0)
2007–2009	Racing Union Luxembourg	37	(1)
- * Club domestic league appearances and goals

Vinh Long Harry Willemin (born 8 January 1982) is a French former professional footballer who played as a defender.

== Career ==
In 2003, Willemin signed for Louhans-Cuiseaux in the French fourth division from French Ligue 1 side Metz.

Before the second half of the 2005–06 season, he signed for SC Hauenstein in the German fourth division from 2. Bundesliga club 1. FC Saarbrücken.

Before the second half of the 2006–07 season, he signed for Viterbese in the Italian third division before joining Luxembourgish team Racing Union Luxembourg.

In 2007, Willemin applied to represent Vietnam internationally but was not selected to the national team.
