= 2015–16 Oberliga Rheinland-Pfalz/Saar =

- Season: 2015–16
- Champions: TuS Koblenz
- Promoted: TuS Koblenz
- Relegated: SpVgg EGC Wirges SV Elversberg II SV Mehring SVN Zweibrücken
- Matches: 290
- Top goalscorer: Björn Recktenwald (27 goals)
- Highest attendance: 2,650
- Lowest attendance: 50
- Total attendance: 81,440
- Average attendance: 281

The 2015–16 season of the Oberliga Rheinland-Pfalz/Saar, the highest association football league in the states of Saarland and Rhineland-Palatinate, was the eighth season of the league at tier five (V) of the German football league system and the 38th season overall since establishment of the league in 1978, then as the Oberliga Südwest.

The season began on 31 July 2015 and finished on 21 May 2016, interrupted by a winter break from 6 December to 27 February.

== 2015–16 standings ==
The league featured six new clubs for the 2015–16 season with FSV Jägersburg promoted from the Saarlandliga, FK Pirmasens II from the Verbandsliga Südwest and FC Karbach and SV Mehring from the Rheinlandliga while SVN Zweibrücken and TuS Koblenz had been relegated from the Regionalliga Südwest.

Pos	Team	Pld	W	D	L	GF	GA	GD	Pts	Promotion, qualification or relegation
1	TuS Koblenz (C, P)	32	23	7	2	68	23	+45	76	Promotion to Regionalliga Südwest
2	SC Hauenstein (Q)	32	19	5	8	49	29	+20	62	Qualification to promotion playoffs
3	FC Karbach	32	15	9	8	52	46	+6	54	
4	Borussia Neunkirchen	32	14	9	9	51	44	+7	51	
5	FC Hertha Wiesbach	32	14	5	13	55	51	+4	47	
6	TSG Pfeddersheim	32	12	8	12	50	39	+11	44	
7	SV Röchling Völklingen	32	11	10	11	40	41	−1	43	
8	FSV Jägersburg	32	12	6	14	49	58	−9	42	
9	FSV Salmrohr	32	11	8	13	49	49	0	41	
10	SpVgg EGC Wirges (Note: SpVgg EGC Wirges decided to withdraw from the Oberliga to the Rheinlandliga at the end of season regardless of final place in the standings.) (R)	32	11	8	13	38	46	−8	41	Relegation to Verbandsliga
11	SV Gonsenheim	32	11	8	13	50	59	−9	41	
12	Arminia Ludwigshafen	32	12	5	15	49	61	−12	41	
13	TSV Schott Mainz	32	12	3	17	65	64	+1	39	
14	SpVgg Burgbrohl	32	12	3	17	49	61	−12	39	
15	FK Pirmasens II (Note: Reserve teams of Regionalliga clubs are ineligible for Regionalliga promotion.)	32	10	7	15	44	47	−3	37	
16	SV Elversberg II (R)	32	10	4	18	53	70	−17	34	Relegation to Verbandsliga
17	SV Mehring (R)	32	7	7	18	41	64	−23	28	Relegation to Verbandsliga
18	SVN Zweibrücken (Note: SVN Zweibrücken withdrew from the league during the winter break because of insolvency.) (R)	25	6	2	17	17	86	−69	20	Withdrawn to C-Klasse

Source: kicker.de
Rules for classification: 1) Points; 2) Goal difference; 3) Goals scored; 4) head-to-head results; 5) goals scored away from home against opponent; 6) goals scored away from home; 7) drawing of lots
(C) Champions; (P) Promoted; (Q) Qualified for the phase indicated; (R) Relegated

=== Top goalscorers ===
The top goal scorers for the season:<

Rank	Player	Club	Goals
1	(Germany) Björn Recktenwald	FC Hertha Wiesbach	27
2	(Germany) Can Özer	TSV Schott Mainz	26
3	(Germany) Fatjon Celani	TuS Koblenz	20

== Promotion play-off ==
Promotion play-off were held at the end of the season for both the Regionalliga above and the Oberliga.

=== To the Regionalliga ===
The runners-up of the Hessenliga, Oberliga Baden-Württemberg and Oberliga Rheinland-Pfalz/Saar competed for one more spot in the Regionalliga Südwest, with each team playing the other just once:

Pos	Team	Pld	W	D	L	GF	GA	GD	Pts	Promotion, qualification or relegation	FCN	RWF	SCH
1	FC Nöttingen (P)	2	1	1	0	7	6	+1	4	Promotion to Regionalliga	—	3–2	—
2	Rot-Weiss Frankfurt	2	1	0	1	5	5	0	3		—	—	3–2
3	SC Hauenstein	2	0	1	1	6	7	−1	1		4–4	—	—

Source: Weltfussball.de
Rules for classification: 1) Points; 2) Head-to-head; 3) Decider;
(P) Promoted

=== To the Oberliga ===
The runners-up of the Rheinlandliga, Verbandsliga Südwest and Saarlandliga played each other for one more spot in the Oberliga which SV Morlautern won.

Team 1	Score	Team 2
SV Morlautern	4–2	TuS Koblenz II
TuS Koblenz II	0–2	SV Mettlach
SV Mettlach	1–3	SV Morlautern
