= FC Hertha Wiesbach =

- Full name: Fußballclub Hertha Wiesbach e.V.
- Founded: 1908
- Ground: ProWinStadion
- Chairman: Kunibert Klein
- Manager: Heiko Wilhelm
- League: Oberliga Rheinland-Pfalz/Saar (V)
- 2025–26: Oberliga Rheinland-Pfalz/Saar, 7th of 18
Home colours	Away colours

The FC Hertha Wiesbach is a German association football club from the Wiesenbach suburb of Eppelborn, Saarland.

The club's greatest success has been to earn promotion to the tier five Oberliga Rheinland-Pfalz/Saar in 2013.

== History ==
The club was formed in August 1908 as SSK Hertha Mangelhausen, with the name Hertha derived from the much more famous Hertha BSC Berlin. In the mid-1920s the club adopted its current name.

For most of its history the club has been a non-descript amateur side in local football. The clubs slow rise through the league system began in 1992 when it earned promotion to the then tier-six Bezirksliga Saarland-Nord. Wiesenbach played in this league for the next eight season until a league championship took it up to the Landesliga in 2000.

Four seasons in the Landesliga Saarland-Nordost followed until 2004, when another league title meant promotion to the Verbandsliga Saarland. Wiesenbach spend five seasons in this league, generally achieving good results. In 2009 the Saarlandliga was introduced as a new league in the Saarland between the Oberliga and the Verbandsliga and the club qualified for this league on the strength of a third place in 2008–09. The next four seasons Wiesenbach always finished in the top four, culminating in another league championship in 2013.

The later allowed the club to leave the Saarland league system for the first time and earn promotion to the Oberliga Rheinland-Pfalz/Saar. In its first season there Wiesenbach finished in eighth place.

== Honours ==
The club's honours:

=== League ===
- Saarlandliga
  - Champions: 2013
- Landesliga Saarland-Nordost
  - Champions: 2004
- Bezirksliga Saarland-Nord
  - Champions: 2000
  - Runners-up: 1999

=== Cup ===
- Saarland Cup
  - Runners-up: 2013

== Recent seasons ==
The recent season-by-season performance of the club:

Season	Division	Tier	Position
1999–2000	Bezirksliga Saarland-Nord	VII	1st ↑
2000–01	Landesliga Saarland-Nordost	VI	9th
2001–02	Landesliga Saarland-Nordost	VI	10th
2002–03	Landesliga Saarland-Nordost	VI	4th
2003–04	Landesliga Saarland-Nordost	VI	1st ↑
2004–05	Verbandsliga Saarland	V	8th
2005–06	Verbandsliga Saarland	V	3rd
2006–07	Verbandsliga Saarland	V	3rd
2007–08	Verbandsliga Saarland	V	5th
2008–09	Verbandsliga Saarland	VI	3rd
2009–10	Saarlandliga	VI	3rd
2010–11	Saarlandliga	VI	3rd
2011–12	Saarlandliga	VI	4th
2012–13	Saarlandliga	VI	1st ↑
2013–14	Oberliga Rheinland-Pfalz/Saar	V	8th
2014–15	Oberliga Rheinland-Pfalz/Saar	V	10th
2015–16	Oberliga Rheinland-Pfalz/Saar	V	5th
2016–17	Oberliga Rheinland-Pfalz/Saar	V	

- With the introduction of the Regionalligas in 1994 and the 3. Liga in 2008 as the new third tier, below the 2. Bundesliga, all leagues below dropped one tier. With the introduction of the Saarlandliga in 2009 all leagues below dropped one tier.

=== Key ===
↑ Promoted	↓ Relegated
