= SG Bad Breisig =

German football club

- Full name: Sportgemeinschaft Bad Breisig 1988 e.V.
- Founded: 1988
- Ground: Rheintalstadion Am weißen Kreuz
- Capacity: 2,500
- Chairman: Guido Ernst
- Manager: Klaus Adams
- League: Bezirksliga Rheinland-Mitte (VII)
- 2015–16: Rheinlandliga (VI), 18th (relegated)
Home colours	Away colours

Sportgemeinschaft Bad Breisig, abbreviated SG Bad Breisig, is a German association football club based in Bad Breisig, a small town near Bad Neuenahr-Ahrweiler in northern Rhineland-Palatinate. The club also has departments for athletics, badminton, gymnastics, Jujitsu, and scuba diving.

== History ==
The club was established in 1988 through the merger of Sportfreunde Germania Oberbreisig and Sportverein Niederbreisig. The combined side advanced to the Verbandsliga Rheinland (V) in 2004. The 2007–08 season was the most successful in the short history of SG as they advanced to the semi-final of the Rheinland Pokal (Rhineland Cup) and won promotion to the Oberliga Südwest (V). The club attempted twice to establish itself in the Oberliga but on both occasions was relegated again to the Rheinlandliga. A last-place finish in the Rheinlandliga in 2015–16 saw the club relegated to the Bezirksliga.

Since 2004 the position of club chairman has been held by Guido Ernst, a politician and spokesperson for the Christian Democratic Union, the country's largest political party.

== Honours ==
The club's honours:

- Rheinlandliga
  - Runners-up: 2007, 2008, 2010
- Bezirksliga Rheinland-Mitte
  - Champions: 2004

== Recent seasons ==
The recent season-by-season performance of the club:

Season	Division	Tier	Position
2002–03	Landesliga Rheinland-Nord	VI	7th
2003–04	Bezirksliga Rheinland-Mitte	VI	1st ↑
2004–05	Rheinlandliga	V	16th
2005–06	Rheinlandliga	V	7th
2006–07	Rheinlandliga	V	2nd
2007–08	Rheinlandliga	V	2nd ↑
2008–09	Oberliga Südwest	V	17th ↓
2009–10	Rheinlandliga	VI	2nd ↑
2010–11	Oberliga Südwest	V	17th ↓
2011–12	Rheinlandliga	VI	4th
2012–13	Rheinlandliga	VI	7th
2013–14	Rheinlandliga	VI	14th
2014–15	Rheinlandliga	VI	12th
2015–16	Rheinlandliga	VI	18th ↓
2016–17	Bezirksliga Rheinland-Mitte	VII	

- With the introduction of the Regionalligas in 1994 and the 3. Liga in 2008 as the new third tier, below the 2. Bundesliga, all leagues below dropped one tier.

↑ Promoted	↓ Relegated

== Stadium ==
The footballers play their home fixtures at the Rheintalstadion Am weißen Kreuz.
