= SV Mettlach =

German football club

- Full name: Sportverein 1920 Mettlach e.V.
- Founded: 1920
- Ground: Stadion Am Schwimmbad
- Capacity: 4,500
- Manager: Markus Kneip
- League: Saarlandliga (VI)
- 2015–16: 2nd
Home colours	Away colours

SV Mettlach is a German association football club from the city of Mettlach, Saarland.

== History ==
The side has its origins in the establishment of the gymnastics club Turnverein Mettlach in 1885. A football department was formed in 1920 and became independent in 1923. Following World War II all organizations across the country, including sports and football associations, were ordered disbanded by occupying Allied authorities. The team was re-established 12 May 1946 as Spielvereinigung Mettlach out of the former memberships of several local clubs and resumed its traditional identity as Sportverein 1920 Mettlach in 1950.

Following the war, the Saarland was occupied by France and administered as the Saar protectorate. Although still considered part of Germany, the state was subject attempts to make it part of France or to create a separate country there until it was re-united with Germany following a 1955 plebiscite. This was manifested in football through the establishment of a league structure separate from the German Football Association (Deutscher Fußball Bund), the appearance of the region's top sides in French competition, and the formation of a national side that took part in qualification play for the 1954 FIFA World Cup.

After the 1950–51 season, Saarland's domestic football competition was re-integrated with Germany's. SV remained in lower level local play until advancing to the 2. Amateurliga Saar/West (III) in 1957. Mettlach fielded competitive sides through the late 1950s and early 1960s, earning a string of top-three finishes in third- and fourth-tier play. Following the formation of the top-flight Bundesliga in 1963, the club's performance deteriorated.

By the early 1980s, SV was part of the Verbandsliga Saarland (IV) and would continue to compete as a fourth-tier side there and in the Oberliga Südwest (IV) until the turn of the millennium. Mettlach made appearances in the opening rounds of the DFB-Pokal (German Cup) in 1985 and 1994. The team slipped to what had become the fifth-tier Verbandsliga Saar in 2002, and recently won its way back to Oberliga play for 2008–09 but lasted for only one season before being relegated down to the new Saarlandliga.

== Honours ==
The club's honours:

- 2. Amateurliga Saar-West (IV)
  - Champions: 1961, 1966
- Bezirksliga Saarland-West (V)
  - Champions: 1981
- Landesliga Saarland-SW (V)
  - Champions: 1983
- Verbandsliga Saarland (V)
  - Champions: 1993, 2000, 2008
- Saarland Cup
  - Winners: 1984, 1993, 1995

== Recent seasons ==
The recent season-by-season performance of the club:

Season	Division	Tier	Position
1999–2000	Verbandsliga Saarland	V	1st ↑
2000–01	Oberliga Südwest	IV	15th
2001–02	Oberliga Südwest	IV	17th ↓
2002–03	Verbandsliga Saarland	V	9th
2003–04	Verbandsliga Saarland	V	6th
2004–05	Verbandsliga Saarland	V	11th
2005–06	Verbandsliga Saarland	V	5th
2006–07	Verbandsliga Saarland	V	5th
2007–08	Verbandsliga Saarland	V	2nd ↑
2008–09	Oberliga Südwest	V	18th ↓
2009–10	Saarlandliga	VI	4th
2010–11	Saarlandliga	VI	7th
2011–12	Saarlandliga	VI	6th
2012–13	Saarlandliga	VI	8th
2013–14	Saarlandliga	VI	3rd
2014–15	Saarlandliga	VI	7th
2015–16	Saarlandliga	VI	2nd
2016–17	Saarlandliga	VI	

- With the introduction of the Regionalligas in 1994 and the 3. Liga in 2008 as the new third tier, below the 2. Bundesliga, all leagues below dropped one tier. The Saarlandliga was introduced in 2009 and replaced the Verbandsliga Saarland at the sixth tier of football in the Saarland. In 2012 the Oberliga Südwest was renamed Oberliga Rheinland-Pfalz/Saar.

↑ Promoted	↓ Relegated
