= Regionalliga West/Südwest =

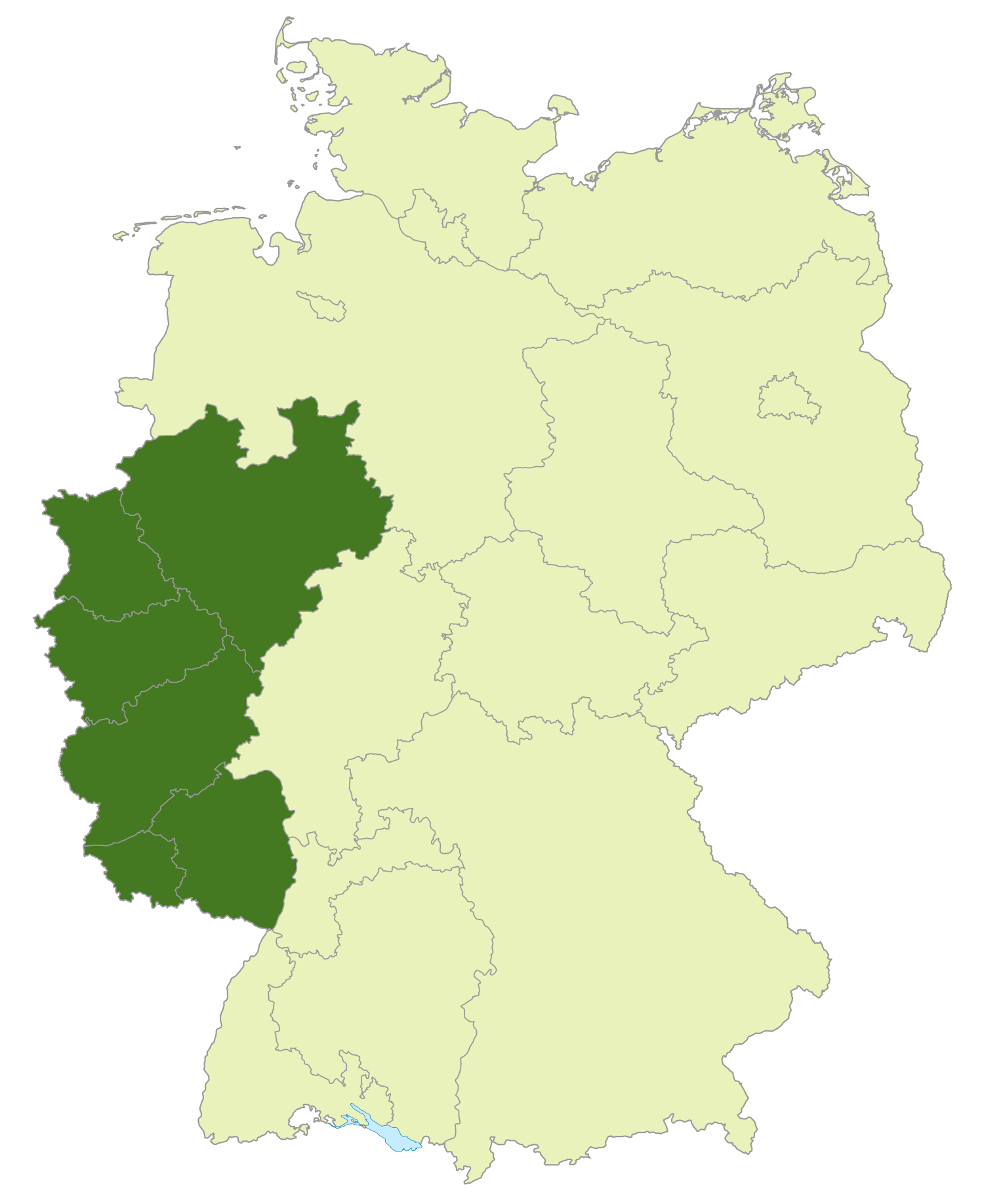
- Founded: 1994
- Folded: 2000 (6 seasons)
- Replaced by: Regionalliga Nord; Regionalliga Süd
- Country: Germany
- State: North Rhine-Westphalia; Rhineland-Palatinate; Saarland
- Level on pyramid: Level 3
- Promotion to: 2nd Bundesliga
- Relegation to: Oberliga Südwest; Oberliga Nordrhein; Oberliga Westfalen
- Last champions: 1. FC Saarbrücken; (1999–2000)

The Regionalliga West/Südwest was the third tier of the German football league system in the states of Saarland, Rheinland-Pfalz and Nordrhein-Westfalen from 1994 to 2000.

== Overview ==
The Regionalliga West/Südwest was formed in 1994 to form a regional third level of play between the 2. Bundesliga and the Oberligas Westfalen, Nordrhein and Südwest. The league was made up of 18 clubs, with six each from the three regions it covered. It was formed alongside three other Regionalligas, the Regionalliga Nord, Nordost and Süd.

The founding members were:

From the 2. Bundesliga:

- Rot-Weiß Essen (Oberliga Nordrhein region)

From the Oberliga Westfalen:

- Arminia Bielefeld
- SC Verl
- TuS Paderborn-Neuhaus
- SpVgg Erkenschwick
- SG Wattenscheid 09 II
- Preußen Münster

From the Oberliga Nordrhein:

- Wuppertaler SV
- Alemannia Aachen
- Bonner SC
- Preußen Köln
- 1. FC Bocholt

From the Oberliga Südwest:

- FSV Salmrohr
- SV Eintracht Trier 05
- Borussia Neunkirchen
- SC Hauenstein
- SV Edenkoben
- VfB Wissen

The number of teams in the league varied, starting its first season (1995) with 18, then 19 (1996), 18 (1997, 1998), 17 (1999), and 20 (2000).

The league winner was always promoted to the 2. Bundesliga; the runners up were also promoted in two of the seasons. The regulation on which of the runners-up of the four Regionalligas went up meant that promotion was allocated in an alternating way. After 1995, it gave the runners-up a chance to gain promotion too via a play-off.

In its final season (2000), Regionalliagas were reduced from four to two. With the exception of the Sportfreunde Siegen, clubs from Nordrhein-Westfalen went to the Regionalliga Nord. The clubs from Rheinland-Pfalz and Saarland went to the Regionalliga Süd.

In 2008, the number of Regionalligas will be expanded from two to three and there will be a new Regionalliga West which will cover exactly the area the old Regionalliga West/Südwest did, but will then be the fourth tier of German football.

== Disbanding of the Regionalliga West/Südwest ==
When the league was discontinued in 2000, the first two clubs in the league went to the 2. Bundesliga, clubs placed third to twelfth moved to the two remaining Regionalligas, seven to the north and three to the south. The other eight league teams were relegated down to the Oberligas.

To the Regionalliga Nord:

- SG Wattenscheid 09
- Fortuna Düsseldorf
- Rot-Weiß Essen
- SC Preußen Münster
- SC Verl
- Borussia Dortmund II
- KFC Uerdingen 05

To the Regionalliga Süd:

- Sportfreunde Siegen
- SV Eintracht Trier 05
- SV Elversberg

The Sportfreunde Siegen were the oddity in this distribution, being from the state of Nordrhein-Westfalen which had all its clubs in the northern group except the Sportfreunde. The reason for this was that Siegen is in the far south of the state.

== Winners and runners-up of the Regionalliga West/Südwest ==
| Season | Winner | Runner-up |
|---|---|---|
| 1994–95 | Arminia Bielefeld | SC Verl |
| 1995–96 | FC Gütersloh | Rot-Weiß Essen |
| 1996–97 | SG Wattenscheid 09 | Rot-Weiß Oberhausen |
| 1997–98 | Rot-Weiß Oberhausen | Sportfreunde Siegen |
| 1998–99 | Alemannia Aachen | SV Eintracht Trier 05 |
| 1999–2000 | 1. FC Saarbrücken | LR Ahlen |

Source:"Regionalliga West/Südwest". Das deutsche Fußball-Archiv.

- All league winners promoted.
- In 1996 and 2000, Rot-Weiß Essen and LR Ahlen were also promoted as runners-up.

== Placings in the Regionalliga West/Südwest ==
The following clubs have played in the league and achieved the following final positions:

| Club | 1995 | 1996 | 1997 | 1998 | 1999 | 2000 |
|---|---|---|---|---|---|---|
| Arminia Bielefeld | 1 | 2B | B | B | 2B | B |
| Rot-Weiß Oberhausen | | 8 | 2 | 1 | 2B | 2B |
| Alemannia Aachen | 6 | 6 | 11 | 7 | 1 | 2B |
| 1. FC Saarbrücken | 2B | 7 | 3 | 4 | 5 | 1 |
| LR Ahlen | | | 4 | 6 | 6 | 2 |
| Sportfreunde Siegen | | | | 2 | 3 | 3 |
| SG Wattenscheid 09 | 2B | 2B | 1 | 2B | 2B | 4 |
| SV Eintracht Trier 05 | 7 | 15 | 9 | 5 | 2 | 5 |
| Fortuna Düsseldorf | 2B | B | B | 2B | 2B | 6 |
| Rot-Weiß Essen | 4 | 2 | 2B | 17 | | 7 |
| SC Preußen Münster | 10 | 9 | 5 | 8 | 4 | 8 |
| SC Verl | 2 | 10 | 7 | 10 | 10 | 9 |
| Borussia Dortmund II | | | | | 14 | 10 |
| KFC Uerdingen 05 | B | B | 2B | 2B | 2B | 11 |
| SV Elversberg | | | 18 | | 12 | 12 |
| TuS Paderborn-Neuhaus/SC Paderborn 07 | 9 | 5 | 10 | 9 | 7 | 13 |
| 1. FC Kaiserslautern II | | 16 | | 11 | 11 | 14 |
| VfL Bochum II | | | | | | 15 |
| Bayer 04 Leverkusen II | | | | | 9 | 16 |
| FK Pirmasens | | | | | | 17 |
| SC Idar-Oberstein | | | | | | 18 |
| FSV Salmrohr | 3 | 13 | 14 | 14 | 15 | 19 |
| FC Gütersloh | | 1 | 2B | 2B | 2B | 20 |
| Wuppertaler SV | 5 | 4 | 6 | 12 | 8 | |
| FC 08 Homburg | 2B | 3 | 8 | 3 | 13 | |
| SpVgg Erkenschwick | 11 | 11 | 13 | 15 | 16 | |
| FC Remscheid | | | 15 | 13 | 17 | |
| Bonner SC | 12 | 19 | | 16 | | |
| Germania Teveren | | | 12 | 18 | | |
| SC Hauenstein | 15 | 14 | 16 | | | |
| 1. FC Bocholt | 13 | 12 | 17 | | | |
| SG Wattenscheid 09 II | 14 | 17 | | | | |
| Borussia Neunkirchen | 8 | 18 | | | | |
| Preußen Köln | 16 | | | | | |
| SV Edenkoben | 17 | | | | | |
| VfB Wissen | 18 | | | | | |

Source:"Regionalliga West/Südwest". Das deutsche Fußball-Archiv.

=== Key ===
| Symbol | Key |
|---|---|
| B | Bundesliga |
| 2B | 2. Bundesliga |
| 3L | 3. Liga |
| 1 | League champions |
| Place | League |
| Blank | Played at a league level below this league |
| RL | Played in one of the other Regionalligas |

=== Notes ===
- In 1997, TuS Paderborn-Neuhaus was renamed SC Paderborn 07.
- In 1999, Wuppertaler SV and FC Homburg were relegated for financial reasons.
