= German reserve football teams =

German reserve football teams compete at all levels of league football within the German football league system apart from the top two divisions, the Bundesliga and 2. Bundesliga. The highest league these teams can currently enter is the 3. Liga, set at the third tier of the league system.

Until 2005, reserve teams of professional sides carried the title Amateure behind the club name to distinguish between the professional and reserve team of a club while all other reserve teams carried the Roman numeral II behind the club name as a distinction. Since 2005 all reserve teams carry the Roman numeral, regardless of the status of the first team. Any additional reserve teams carry the following Roman numeral behind the club's name.

From 1974 to 2008 reserve teams were permitted to compete in the DFB-Pokal, the premier German Cup competition. Arguably the greatest success of any reserve team has been the achievement of Hertha BSC Amateure which reached the German Cup final in 1992–93. Additional achievements have been the eleven titles won by reserve teams in the now defunct German amateur football championship.

In the former East Germany, reserve teams were at times permitted to play at the second tier of league football, below the DDR-Oberliga, in the DDR-Liga, and have achieved division titles at this level. As an example, the reserve team of BFC Dynamo, the BFC Dynamo II, under coach Werner Voigt won the DDR-Liga Staffel A in the 1985–86 season.

== Rules and regulations ==
Reserve teams in Germany are permitted to play at all league levels except the top two divisions. Another restriction applies to the Regionalligas, where the number of reserve teams is restricted to seven per regional division. Reserve teams of 3. Liga clubs are also not permitted to play at Regionalliga level.

Until 2014 reserve teams in the form of under 23 sides were compulsory for Bundesliga and 2. Bundesliga clubs, this rule was however dropped at the end of the 2013–14 season. Reserve teams at this level are generally run as under 23 side and have U 23 attached to their name as special exceptions apply to the use of under 23 players in both the first and second teams. While senior players can not be freely moved between the individual teams of clubs and require a four-game stand down period between team moves this rule is relaxed for under 23 players.

Reserve teams are not permitted to take part in the DFB-Pokal anymore. Should a reserve team qualify for it through its league placing or a regional Verbandspokal the spot will be awarded to the next-ranked first team.

The leagues below the 3. Liga are governed by regional federations and associations and rules and regulations governing reserve teams can vary. In the Bavarian Football Association, the largest regional one in Germany, reserve teams can only play one tier below the league of the senior team from the Regionalliga Bayern, the fourth tier, to the Kreisliga, the eighth tier. Below the Kreisliga reserve teams can play at the same level as the senior team but not in the same league. If this is the case a club has to designate a first and second team before the start of the season.

== History ==
=== West Germany ===
In post-Second World War West Germany and the Saarland, which joined the former in 1957, reserve teams of professional sides playing at Oberliga and 2. Oberliga level, termed Vertragsspielervereine (English: Clubs with contracted players), were granted permission by the DFB in 1951 to field an amateur reserve team within the league system. Reserve teams started earning promotion to the third tier, the highest level they were permitted to play, in the late 1950s. The third tier of league football in the West was generally quite regionalised with most leagues carrying the title 1. Amateurliga in their name. The exception was Northern Germany and West Berlin, where the Amateurliga was set at the second tier as there were no 2. Oberligas in those two regions.

An early forerunner of these teams was the 1. FC Saarbrücken II which played in the Ehrenliga Saarland from 1948 to 1951 in place of its senior team which played the 1948–49 season in Division 2 in the French football league system and in a friendlies competition, the Saarland Cup, until 1951.

From the late 1950s reserve teams started to win league titles in their respective Amateurligas. While they were permitted to play in the German amateur championship they could not achieve promotion to the leagues above. With the introduction of the Bundesliga in 1963 the Oberligas and 2. Oberligas were replaced by the Bundesliga and five Regionalligas below. The Amateurligas remained as the third tier and the status of reserve teams remained unchanged.

From 1974 onwards amateur teams could qualify for the enlarged DFB-Pokal through the regional cup competitions, the Verbandspokale, which incidentally also opened the competition to reserve teams.

Also in 1974 the five Regionalligas were replaced by two regional 2. Bundesligas. In 1978 the Amateurligas were renamed to Amateur-Oberligas and reduced in number to eight leagues. On both occasions the status of the reserve teams remained untouched.

=== East Germany ===
The DDR-Liga was established as the second tier of the league system in 1950 and did not initially include any reserve teams. The first reserve side to play in the league was Chemie Halle II which played there for a season in 1958, at a time when East German football followed the Soviet Unions example and played a calendar year season. The team was relegated immediately again despite finishing fourth because the senior team was relegated to the DDR-Liga. Reserve teams returned to the league for the 1967–68 season, now played in the autumn-spring format again and in two regional divisions, when F.C. Hansa Rostock II, FC Carl Zeiss Jena II and Rot-Weiß Erfurt II were promoted to the league. The league was expanded in 1971 to five regional divisions and BFC Dynamo II became the first reserve team to win a division in 1971–72, repeating this success the following season with Dynamo Dresden II also taking out a league title. Chemie Halle II and Carl Zeiss Jena II won division titles in 1975–76 but all eleven reserve teams were removed from the league and relegated at the end of that season.

At the end of the 1983–84 season the DDR-Liga was reduced to two divisions again and reserve teams were re-admitted to the league with five reserve teams earning promotion. Dynamo Berlin II won a third championship in the second division in 1985–86, the last of any reserve team. The last two reserve teams to compete in the DDR-Liga were Dynamo Dresden II and Dynamo Berlin II, with both leaving the league after the 1988–89 season.

No reserve team ever reached the final of the FDGB-Pokal, the premier East German cup competition.

=== Germany ===
In 1991 the German reunion brought an influx of former East German teams and their reserve sides as well as three new Amateur-Oberligas in the East. In 1994 the Regionalligas were reintroduced, now as the new third tier of league football, with five regional divisions. Reserve teams were permitted to enter this league provided they had qualified.

The number of Regionalliga divisions was reduced to two in 2000. From 2005 onwards reserve teams of professional sides in the two Bundesligas were rebranded to the Roman numeral II behind the club name instead of the designation Amateure. In 2008 another major change was made to the league system when the 3. Liga was established. Reserve teams were granted the right to enter this new third division, also initially a ban on reserve teams in the league was considered, but were from then on banned from the DFB-Pokal. The number of Regionalligas was expanded to three again and to five in 2012. Reserve teams of 3. Liga clubs were not permitted to enter Regionalliga level and could only rise as far as the Oberliga below. Additionally, the number of reserve teams per Regionalliga division was capped at seven but with the possibility of exceptions being granted.

In 2014 a change in the regulations by the Deutsche Fußball Liga regarding reserve teams meant that such sides, in the form of under 23 teams, were not compulsory anymore for Bundesliga and 2. Bundesliga clubs. Following this change some reserve teams were withdrawn from competition, among them Eintracht Frankfurt II, FSV Frankfurt II and Bayer 04 Leverkusen II. Bayer 04 Leverkusen had requested the change as it did not see much potential for reserve team players in the Regionalliga to break through to the Bundesliga side and wanted to focus on its under 17 and under 19 sides instead and to loan out young players.

This trend continued at the end of the 2014–15 season when both Dynamo Dresden and Chemnitzer FC withdrew their reserve teams, instead favouring a competition of friendly matches that could include other reserve teams from the region as well as the Czech Republic. Apart from these two teams, 1. FC Saarbrücken II, 1. FC Union Berlin II, VfL Bochum II, SpVgg Unterhaching II and SV Wehen Wiesbaden II were also withdrawn at the end of the season.

== Support ==
Reserve teams generally average less spectators than first teams in the same league. Since the establishment of the 3. Liga, for example, reserve teams have generally taken up the bottom spots in the spectator tables of the league, the exception being Borussia Dortmund II which fared slightly better. While the 3. Liga, in recent seasons, averaged around 5,000 spectators per home game reserve sides like VfB Stuttgart II and Werder Bremen II have averaged between 1,000 and 1,500 spectators.

Notable exceptions in the recent past have been the Munich derby between FC Bayern Munich II and TSV 1860 Munich II, which have drawn near-capacity crowds of 12,000 at the Grünwalder Stadion in the Regionalliga Bayern and, on occasion, have been broadcast live on television. The down side of this expanded interest has been the need for heavy police presence to control the rival fan groups.

== Achievements ==
=== DFB-Pokal ===
The greatest success of any reserve team in the German Cup has been the 1993 finals appearance of Hertha BSC Amateure, where it lost 1–0 to Bayer 04 Leverkusen. A number of other reserve teams have progressed to the later rounds of the competition.

There has also been a number of instances of a reserve side being drawn against their own senior team, these being FC Bayern Munich Amateure against FC Bayern Munich in 1976–77 (3–5), 1. FC Kaiserslautern Amateure against 1. FC Kaiserslautern in 1997–98 (0–5) and VfB Stuttgart Amateure against VfB Stuttgart in 2000–01 (0–3). After the latest instance, a rule change was implemented that prevent first and reserve teams being drawn against each other unless it was the final. Reserve teams qualified for the German Cup through success in their respective Verbandspokal, one of currently twenty one regional cup competitions who also act as qualifying for the first round of the German Cup. At the end of the 2007–08 season reserve teams were banned from the DFB-Pokal in exchange for the right to play in the 3. Liga.

The following reserve teams have competed in the DFB-Pokal, sorted by the last season they have played in the competition:

Team	No	Seasons	Best
SV Werder Bremen II	19	1976–77, 1978–79, 1982–83, 1983–84, 1987–88, 1989–90, 1990–91, 1991–92, 1993–94, 1994–95, 1995–96, 1997–98, 1998–99, **1999–2000**, 2000–01, 2001–02, 2002–03, 2004–05, **2007–08**	3rd round
Bayer Leverkusen II	8	1981–82, 1989–90, 1992–93, 1996–97, 1998–99, 2000–01, 2003–04, 2007–08	1st round
F.C. Hansa Rostock II	3	1998–99, 2005–06, 2006–07	1st round
Alemannia Aachen II	2	2002–03, 2006–07	1st round
1. FC Köln II	10	1975–76, 1976–77, 1979–80, **1981–82**, 1982–83, **1983–84**, 1985–86, 1995–96, **2004–05**, 2005–06	2nd round
VfL Bochum II	2	**1984–85**, 2005–06	2nd round
1. FSV Mainz 05 II	5	2001–02, 2002–03, 2003–04, 2004–05, 2005–06	1st round
FC Rot-Weiß Erfurt II	1	2005–06	1st round
VfL Wolfsburg II	4	**2001–02**, 2002–03, **2003–04**, 2005–06	2nd round
Hertha BSC II	3	1976–77, **1992–93**, 2004–05	Final
FC Bayern Munich II	9	1974–75, 1976–77, 1982–83, 1984–85, 1993–94, **1994–95**, 1995–96, 2002–03, **2004–05**	Quarter finals
Jahn Regensburg II	1	2004–05	1st round
Hannover 96 II	5	1966–67, 1976–77, 1981–82, 1982–83, 2004–05	1st round
1. FC Saarbrücken II	1	2002–03	1st round
VfB Stuttgart II	7	**1974–75**, 1975–76, 1981–82, 1981–82, 1982–83, 2000–01, 2001–02	Quarter finals
FC St. Pauli II	2	1998–99, 2001–02	1st round
FC Energie Cottbus II	2	1998–99, 2001–02	1st round
FC Schalke 04 II	2	1994–95, 2001–02	1st round
SC Freiburg II	1	2001–02	1st round
Karlsruher SC II	4	1991–92, 1994–95, **1996–97**, 2000–01	3rd round
Tennis Borussia Berlin II	1	2000–01	1st round
Hamburger SV II	5	1974–75, 1981–82, **1991–92**, 1996–97, 1997–98	4th round
Borussia Mönchengladbach II	1	1997–98	1st round
1. FC Kaiserslautern II	3	**1979–80**, **1981–82**, 1997–98	2nd round
VfB Leipzig II	1	1996–97	1st round
1. FC Nürnberg II	4	1979–80, 1981–82, **1984–85**, 1995–96	2nd round
FC Carl Zeiss Jena II	1	**1993–94**^{‡}	2nd round
Fortuna Düsseldorf II	2	**1978–79**, 1992–93	2nd round
Borussia Dortmund II	1	1991–92	1st round
Bayer 05 Uerdingen II	1	1982–83	1st round
FSV Frankfurt II	1	1981–82	1st round
Eintracht Braunschweig II	2	1979–80, 1980–81	1st round
Wuppertaler SV II	1	1979–80	1st round
FC Augsburg II	1	**1977–78**	3rd round
Schwarz-Weiß Essen II	1	1975–76	1st round
Eintracht Bad Kreuznach II	1	1974–75	1st round

- All teams are referred to by their current name, regardless of whether they played as Amateure or II at the time.
- **Bold** denotes team's best season in competition for clubs who have advanced past the first round.
- ^{‡} Team received a bye for the first round.

=== German amateur championship ===
Reserve teams have been quite successful in the German amateur football championship during the competitions existence from 1950 to 1998. Of the 48 German amateur championships played eleven were won by reserve teams. These eleven were won by six different teams, with Hannover 96 Amateure and SV Werder Bremen Amateure each winning three while VfB Stuttgart Amateure won two. Three more teams, Fortuna Düsseldorf Amateure, 1. FC Köln Amateure and KSV Holstein Kiel Amateure each won one championship. Further more, FC Bayern Munich Amateure made two losing final appearances while 1. FC Kaiserslautern Amateure and Eintracht Braunschweig Amateure made one. The 1966 final was the only one ever contested by two reserve sides when Werder Bremen beat Hannover 96.

The following championship finals were played with reserve team participation:

Year	Champion	Runner-up	Result	Date	Venue	Attendance
1959–60	Hannover 96 Amateure	BV Osterfeld	1-1 aet 3-0	26 June 1960 29 June 1960	Herford	12,000 9,000
1960–61	KSV Holstein Kiel Amateure	SV Siegburg 04	5–1	24 June 1961	Hannover	70,000
1962–63	VfB Stuttgart Amateure	VfL Wolfsburg	1–0	6 July 1963	Kassel	10,000
1963–64	Hannover 96 Amateure	SV Wiesbaden	2–0	27 June 1964	Hagen	10,000
1964–65	Hannover 96 Amateure	SV Wiesbaden	2–1	27 June 1965	Siegen	8,000
1965–66	SV Werder Bremen Amateure	Hannover 96 Amateure	5–1	2 July 1966	Herford	10,000
1966–67	STV Horst Emscher	Hannover 96 Amateure	2–0	1 July 1967	Herford	8,500
1969–70	SC Jülich	Eintracht Braunschweig Amateure	3–0	11 July 1970	Siegen	8,000
1970–71	SC Jülich	VfB Stuttgart Amateure	1–0	10 July 1971	Würzburg	6,000
1972–73	SpVgg Bad Homburg	1. FC Kaiserslautern Amateure	1–0	30 June 1973	Offenbach	7,000
1976–77	Fortuna Düsseldorf Amateure	SV Sandhausen	1-0 2-2	22 June 1977 26 June 1977	Düsseldorf Sandhausen	8,000 10,000
1979–80	VfB Stuttgart Amateure	FC Augsburg	2–1	20 June 1980	Stuttgart	2,000
1980–81	1. FC Köln Amateure	FC St. Pauli	2–0	14 June 1981	Cologne	7,500
1981–82	FSV Mainz 05	SV Werder Bremen Amateure	3–0	17 June 1982	Mainz	8,000
1982–83	FC 08 Homburg	FC Bayern Munich Amateure	2-0 aet	17 June 1983	Homburg	6,000
1984–85	SV Werder Bremen Amateure	DSC Wanne-Eickel	3–0	22 June 1985	Bremen	3,000
1986–87	MSV Duisburg	FC Bayern Munich Amateure	4–1	21 June 1987	Duisburg	10,000
1990–91	SV Werder Bremen Amateure	SpVgg 07 Ludwigsburg	2–1	9 June 1991	Ludwigsburg	4,500
1992–93	SV Sandhausen	SV Werder Bremen Amateure	2–0		Sandhausen	3,000

=== Leagues ===
Reserve teams have taken out a number of league championships at the third tier of German league football. Apart from titles in the Amateurliga, Amateur-Oberliga and Oberliga, FC Bayern Munich Amateure is also the only team to have won a Regionalliga title while the league operated as the third tier of the league system, the Regionalliga Süd in 2003–04. VfB Stuttgart Amateure, in 2000–01, is the only other reserve team to have finished on a promotion rank in the Regionalliga area, alongside Bayern. With both teams inelegble for promotion the next placed teams moved up instead.

==== 3. Liga ====
The 3. Liga championship-winning reserve teams:

League	Team	No	Seasons
3. Liga	FC Bayern Munich II	1	2019-20

==== Regionalliga ====
The Regionalliga championship-winning reserve teams:

League	Level	Team	No	Seasons
Regionalliga Süd^{†}	3	FC Bayern Munich II	1	2003–04
Regionalliga Bayern	4	FC Bayern Munich II	2	2013–14, 2018–19
Regionalliga Bayern	4	TSV 1860 Munich II	1	2012–13
Regionalliga Nord	4	VfL Wolfsburg II	3	2013–14, 2015–16, 2018–19
Regionalliga Nord	4	SV Werder Bremen II	1	2014–15
Regionalliga Nord	4	Hannover 96 II	1	2023–24
Regionalliga Südwest	4	SC Freiburg II	1	2020–21
Regionalliga Südwest	4	VfB Stuttgart II	1	2023–24
Regionalliga West	4	Borussia Dortmund II	3	2008–09, 2011–12, 2020–21
Regionalliga West	4	Borussia Mönchengladbach II	1	2014–15

==== Oberliga ====
The Oberliga championship-winning reserve teams. The list includes all current and former Oberligas or equivalent leagues, currently on level five of the German league system:

League	Level	Team	No	Seasons
Bayernliga	3 & 4	TSV 1860 Munich II	3	1960–61, 1996–97, 2003–04
Bremen-Liga^{#}	5	SV Werder Bremen III	3	2009–10, 2010–11, 2012–13
Bremen-Liga^{#}	5	SV Werder Bremen II	5	1956–57, 1961–62, 1966–67, 1967–68, 2023–24
Bremen-Liga^{#}	5	TuS Bremerhaven 93 II	1	1968–69
Hessenliga	3 & 5	Eintracht Frankfurt II	3	1969–70, 2001–02, 2022–23
Hessenliga	3 & 5	FSV Frankfurt II	1	2009–10
Mittelrheinliga^{¶}	3	1. FC Köln II	3	1964–65, 1966–67, 1976–77
NOFV-Oberliga Nord	4 & 5	Hertha BSC II	4	1998–99, 2001–02, 2003–04, 2007–08
NOFV-Oberliga Nord	4 & 5	FC Hansa Rostock II	4	1999–2000, 2004–05, 2011–12, 2022–23
NOFV-Oberliga Nord	4 & 5	FC Energie Cottbus II	1	2009–10
NOFV-Oberliga Süd	4 & 5	FC Energie Cottbus II	1	2006–07
NOFV-Oberliga Süd	4 & 5	RB Leipzig II	1	2014–15
Oberliga Baden-Württemberg	3, 4 & 5	Karlsruher SC II	3	1989–90, 1995–96, 2004–05
Oberliga Baden-Württemberg	3, 4 & 5	VfB Stuttgart II	4	1979–80, 1997–98, 2002–03, 2019–20
Oberliga Baden-Württemberg	3, 4 & 5	SC Freiburg II	2	2007–08, 2016–17
Oberliga Baden-Württemberg	3, 4 & 5	TSG 1899 Hoffenheim II	1	2009–10
Oberliga Hamburg^{#}	5	FC St. Pauli II	1	2010–11
Oberliga Hamburg/Schleswig-Holstein^{†}	4	FC St. Pauli II	3	1994–95, 1998–99, 2002–03
Oberliga Hamburg/Schleswig-Holstein^{†}	4	KSV Holstein Kiel II	1	2003–04
Oberliga Hamburg/Schleswig-Holstein^{†}	4	Hamburger SV II	1	2001–02
Oberliga Niedersachsen^{#}	2, 3 & 5	Hannover 96 II	5	1959–60, 1963–64, 1964–65, 1965–66, 1966–67
Oberliga Niedersachsen^{#}	2, 3 & 5	Eintracht Braunschweig II	4	1955–56, 1969–70, 2009–10, 2012–13
Oberliga Niedersachsen/Bremen^{†}	4	VfL Wolfsburg II	1	2003–04
Oberliga Nord^{†}	3 & 4	SV Werder Bremen II	2	1981–82, 1983–84
Oberliga Nord^{†}	3 & 4	VfL Wolfsburg II	1	2006–07
Oberliga Nordrhein^{†}	3 & 4	Bayer 04 Leverkusen II	3	1997–98, 2000–01, 2004–05
Oberliga Nordrhein^{†}	3 & 4	Borussia Mönchengladbach II	2	2005–06, 2007–08
Oberliga Nordrhein^{†}	3 & 4	1. FC Köln II	2	1980–81, 2001–02
Oberliga Niederrhein^{¶}	3	Fortuna Düsseldorf II	1	1976–77
Oberliga Rheinland-Pfalz/Saar	3 & 4	1. FC Kaiserslautern II	3	1994–95, 1996–97, 2000–01
Oberliga Rheinland-Pfalz/Saar	3 & 4	1. FSV Mainz 05 II	2	2002–03, 2007–08
Oberliga Schleswig-Holstein^{#}	2 & 5	KSV Holstein Kiel II	3	1960–61, 2008–09, 2009–10
Oberliga Westfalen	4 & 5	Borussia Dortmund II	3	1997–98, 2001–02, 2005–06
Oberliga Westfalen	4 & 5	Arminia Bielefeld II	2	2003–04, 2013–14
Oberliga Westfalen	4 & 5	FC Schalke 04 II	1	2002–03
Oberliga Westfalen	4 & 5	VfL Bochum II	1	1998–99

- All teams are referred to by their current name, regardless of whether they played as Amateure or II at the time.
- All leagues are referred to by their current name, regardless of their name at the time the teams won the league titles.
- Seasons in italics indicate division titles when league was played in more than one regional division.
- With the introduction of the Regionalliga in 1994 the Oberliga became the fourth tier of the league system. With the introduction of the 3. Liga in 2008 the Regionalliga became the fourth tier of the league system and the Oberliga the fifth tier.
- ^{†} Denotes league is defunct.
- ^{#} League championships won between 1974 and 2008 not counted here as these four leagues did not have Oberliga or highest amateur league status in their regions at the time.
- ^{¶} League championships won between 1978 and 2010 not counted here as these two leagues did not have Oberliga or highest amateur league status in their regions at the time.
