= Saarlandliga =

- Founded: 2009
- Country: Germany
- State: Saarland
- Number of clubs: 18
- Level on pyramid: Level 6
- Promotion to: Oberliga Rheinland-Pfalz/Saar
- Relegation to: Verbandsliga Saarland
- Domestic cup: Saarland Cup
- Current champions: SV Auersmacher (2021–22)

The Saarlandliga (English: Saarland league) is currently the sixth tier of the German football league system in the German federal state of Saarland. It was a new league, introduced at the end of the 2008-09 season.

In the past, the term Saarlandliga has unofficially been used for what was at times the Ehrenliga Saarland, the Amateurliga Saarland and, from 1978, the Verbandsliga Saarland. The new league however carries its name officially and is not known by any other name.

== Overview ==
The league was introduced after a decision made by the Saarland Football Association on 31 May 2008. It was decided that the new league would be operating from the 2009-10 season onwards and slotted in between the tier-five Oberliga Südwest and, from then on, the tier-seven Verbandsliga Saarland. The Verbandsliga remains as a single-division competition, which is unusual for the German football pyramid, where most leagues have two to three feeder leagues below itself.

To qualify for the new league, a club had to finish within the following specifications at the end of the 2008-09 season:

- All Saarland clubs relegated from the Oberliga Südwest (V) qualify.
- The clubs placed second to seventeenth in the Verbandsliga Saarland (VI) qualify. The Verbandsliga winner earns promotion to the Oberliga.
- The two Landesliga (VII) champions qualify.

As the number of clubs relegated from the Oberliga from Saarland was not known at the time this system was decided on, it was determined that for every team relegated, one fewer from the Verbandsliga would qualify. In this case, the SV Mettlach having been relegated, the seventeenth club from the Verbandsliga would not gain entry to the new Saarlandliga. The clubs from the Verbandsliga not qualified for the new league were to remain in the Verbandsliga and would not suffer relegation to the Landesligas.

== Modus ==
Eighteen teams are scheduled to compete in the league since 2009-10, with a home-and-away season format. The league winner is promoted to the Oberliga, while the two last placed teams are relegated to the Verbandsliga. In turn, the best two teams out of that league earn direct promotion to the Saarlandliga.

== League champions ==
The league champions:

Season	Club
2009–10	1. FC Saarbrücken II
2010–11	SV Röchling Völklingen
2011–12	SC Halberg Brebach
2012–13	FC Hertha Wiesbach
2013–14	Saar 05 Saarbrücken
2014–15	FSV Jägersburg
2015–16	FV Diefflen
2016–17	FV Eppelborn
2017–18	TuS Herrensohr
2018–19	SV Elversberg II
2019–20	FV Eppelborn
2020–21	Season curtailed and annulled
2021–22	SV Auersmacher

- In 2013–14 runner-up FV Diefflen was also promoted.
- In 2017–18 TuS Herrensohr declined promotion; runner-up VfB Dillingen was instead promoted.
- In 2019–20 runner-up FSV Jägersburg was also promoted.

== Founding members ==
The following clubs qualified for the new league, according to the above system:

- From the Oberliga Südwest
  - SV Mettlach
- From the Landesligas Saarland
  - Borussia Neunkirchen II
  - VfB Dillingen
- From the Verbandsliga Saarland
  - FSV Jägersburg
  - FC Hertha Wiesbach
  - SC Friedrichsthal
  - SC Halberg Brebach
  - 1. FC Saarbrücken II
  - SV Röchling Völklingen
  - FV Eppelborn
  - 1. FC Riegelsberg
  - FC Reimsbach
  - SG Perl/Besch
  - SV Bübingen
  - FSV Hemmersdorf
  - FC Palatia Limbach
  - VfB Hüttigweiler
  - SC Gresaubach
