= FV Diefflen =

German football club

- Full name: Fußballverein 07 Diefflen e.V.
- Founded: 1907
- Ground: Stadion am Babelsberg
- Manager: Michael Müller
- League: Oberliga Rheinland-Pfalz/Saar (V)
- 2025–26: Oberliga Rheinland-Pfalz/Saar, 13th of 18
Home colours	Away colours

The FV Diefflen is a German association football club from the Diefflen suburb of Dillingen, Saarland.

The club's greatest success has been to earn promotion to the tier five Oberliga Rheinland-Pfalz/Saar in 2014.

== History ==
The club was formed in 1907, originally under the name of FC Diefflen. At the time a number of loosely organised clubs existed in Diefflen which all merged into the current club, FV Diefflen, in 1919. At the end of the First World War, Diefflen, like the rest of the Saarland, was occupied by the French military. The new club had a good relationship with the later which helped in the formation and lead to the first three games of the new FV being played against French military teams. From 1920 onwards the club participated in competitive football. The club struggled for many years to find a home ground, until 1927 when the Dillinger Hüttenwerk leased grounds to the former for 99 years. Diefflen rose to the Kreis-Liga Saar-Mosel by 1930, the local second division of football, where it faced much stronger opposition, like Eintracht Trier.

In post-Second World War football FV Diefflen played a number of seasons in the tier-three Amateurliga Saarland, the highest league in state, from 1956 to 1961 and, again from 1962 to 1964 and in 1970–71. The later meant a more permanent departure from the states highest league, with FV Diefflen not to return to this level for 40 years. The following season, 1971–72, it dropped from the 2. Amateurliga as well. After an era of local amateur football play the club returned as a lower table side in the Bezirksliga Saarland-West in 1978–79 and, again, from 1990 to 1994 but was relegated again on both occasions. It took until 2004 for Diefflen to make another return to the Bezirksliga, after a championship in the Kreisliga A which the club had played in for the previous decade. Now a stronger side the club took only two season to earn another promotion, to the Landesliga Saarland-Südwest in 2006.

FV Diefflen's rise continued in 2009 when it won promotion to the now expanded Verbandsliga Saarland. The Saarlandliga having been introduced in 2009 the club earned promotion to this league as well in 2011, after a second place in the Verbandsliga.

FV Diefflen finished the 2013–14 season as the runners-up of the Saarlandliga and thereby qualified for the promotion round with the runners-up of the Rheinlandliga, SV Morbach, and the Verbandsliga Südwest, FC Fortuna Mombach. With a win and a draw in this round the club earned promotion to the Oberliga Rheinland-Pfalz/Saar for the first time in its history. It was relegated back to the Saarlandliga after one season there but won the 2015–16 league championship there and returned to the Oberliga.

== Honours ==
The club's honours:

- Saarlandliga
  - Champions: 2016
  - Runners-up: 2014
- Verbandsliga Saarland
  - Runners-up: 2011
- Landesliga Saarland-Südwest
  - Runners-up: 2009
- Bezirksliga Saarland-West
  - Champions: 2006
- 2. Amateurliga Saar-West
  - Champions: 1962, 1970

== Recent seasons ==
The recent season-by-season performance of the club:

Season	Division	Tier	Position
1999–2000	Kreisliga A	VIII	
2000–01	Kreisliga A	VIII	
2001–02	Kreisliga A	VIII	
2002–03	Kreisliga A	VIII	
2003–04	Kreisliga A	VIII	1st ↑
2004–05	Bezirksliga Saarland-West	VII	6th
2005–06	Bezirksliga Saarland-West	VII	1st ↑
2006–07	Landesliga Saarland-Südwest	VI	14th
2007–08	Landesliga Saarland-Südwest	VI	3rd
2008–09	Landesliga Saarland-Südwest	VII	2nd ↑
2009–10	Verbandsliga Saarland	VII	5th
2010–11	Verbandsliga Saarland	VII	2nd ↑
2011–12	Saarlandliga	VI	9th
2012–13	Saarlandliga	VI	3rd
2013–14	Saarlandliga	VI	2nd ↑
2014–15	Oberliga Rheinland-Pfalz/Saar	V	16th ↓
2015–16	Saarlandliga	VI	1st ↑
2016–17	Oberliga Rheinland-Pfalz/Saar	V	

- With the introduction of the Regionalligas in 1994 and the 3. Liga in 2008 as the new third tier, below the 2. Bundesliga, all leagues below dropped one tier. With the introduction of the Saarlandliga in 2009 all leagues below dropped one tier.

=== Key ===
↑ Promoted	↓ Relegated
