= 2014–15 Oberliga Rheinland-Pfalz/Saar =

- Season: 2014–15
- Champions: Saar 05 Saarbrücken
- Promoted: Saar 05 Saarbrücken
- Relegated: SC 07 Idar-Oberstein TuS Mechtersheim FV Diefflen: 1. FC Saarbrücken II; SG Betzdorf
- Top goalscorer: Can Özer (24 goals)
- Highest attendance: 1,750
- Lowest attendance: 50
- Total attendance: 74,901
- Average attendance: 245
- All statistics correct as of 5 December 2015.

The 2014–15 season of the Oberliga Rheinland-Pfalz/Saar, the highest association football league in the states of Saarland and Rhineland-Palatinate, was the seventh season of the league at tier five (V) of the German football league system and the 37th season overall since establishment of the league in 1978, then as the Oberliga Südwest.

The season began on 1 August 2014 and finished on 23 May 2015, interrupted by a lengthy winter break.

== Final table ==
The league featured four new clubs for the 2014–15 season with Saar 05 Saarbrücken and FV Diefflen promoted from the Saarlandliga, TSV Schott Mainz from the Verbandsliga Südwest and SpVgg EGC Wirges from the Rheinlandliga while no team had been relegated from the Regionalliga Südwest.

Pos	Team	Pld	W	D	L	GF	GA	GD	Pts	Promotion, qualification or relegation
1	SV Saar 05 Saarbrücken (P)	34	20	10	4	56	22	+34	70	Promotion to Regionalliga Südwest
2	SC Hauenstein	34	21	5	8	60	27	+33	68	Qualification to promotion playoffs
3	TSG Pfeddersheim	34	19	8	7	49	28	+21	65	
4	SV Gonsenheim	34	18	5	11	63	42	+21	59	
5	SV Röchling Völklingen	34	16	11	7	62	47	+15	59	
6	TSV Schott Mainz	34	15	10	9	70	59	+11	55	
7	FSV Salmrohr	34	16	7	11	58	54	+4	55	
8	SpVgg EGC Wirges	34	16	6	12	55	32	+23	54	
9	SV Elversberg II	34	16	6	12	62	52	+10	54	
10	FC Hertha Wiesbach	34	13	7	14	61	56	+5	46	
11	Arminia Ludwigshafen	34	14	4	16	62	64	−2	46	
12	Borussia Neunkirchen	34	12	8	14	51	47	+4	44	
13	SpVgg Burgbrohl	34	11	8	15	45	53	−8	41	
14	SC 07 Idar-Oberstein (R)	34	10	9	15	47	55	−8	39	Relegation to Verbandsliga
15	TuS Mechtersheim (R)	34	10	7	17	59	62	−3	37	Relegation to Verbandsliga
16	FV Diefflen (R)	34	7	8	19	44	83	−39	29	Relegation to Verbandsliga
17	1. FC Saarbrücken II (R)	34	4	5	25	40	91	−51	17	Relegation to Verbandsliga
18	SG Betzdorf (R)	34	4	4	26	21	91	−70	16	Relegation to Verbandsliga

Source: Fussball.de (in German)
Rules for classification: 1) Points; 2) Goal difference; 3) Goals scored; 4) head-to-head results; 5) goals scored away from home against opponent; 6) goals scored away from home; 7) drawing of lots
(P) Promoted; (R) Relegated

=== Top goalscorers ===
The top goal scorers for the season:

Rank	Player	Club	Goals
1	(Germany) Can Özer	TSV Schott Mainz	24
2	(Turkey) Arif Güclü	SV Gonsenheim	22
3	(Turkey) Murat Adigüzel	SV Elversberg II	18
3	Giorgi Piranashvili	SpVgg Burgbrohl	18

== Promotion play-offs ==
Promotion play-offs will be held at the end of the season for both the Regionalliga above and the Oberliga.

=== To the Regionalliga ===
The runners-up of the Hessenliga, Oberliga Rheinland-Pfalz/Saar and the Oberliga Baden-Württemberg, TSV Lehnerz, SC Hauenstein and Bahlinger SC, played each other for one more spot in the Regionalliga. While the first game had been scheduled the second and third depended on the outcome of the first. Bahlinger SC won promotion to the Regionalliga courtesy to a win and a draw.

27 May 2015	TSV Lehnerz	1–1	SC Hauenstein	Stadion Richard-Müller-Straße, Fulda-Lehnerz
19:00	Mistretta 46'	Report	Zimmermann 68'	Attendance: 4,000; Referee: Tobias Fritsch

31 May 2015	Bahlinger SC	0–0	TSV Lehnerz	Kaiserstuhlstadion, Bahlingen
14:00		Report		Attendance: 4,250; Referee: Timo Klein

4 June 2014	SC Hauenstein	0–3	Bahlinger SC	Am Neding, Hauenstein
14:00		Report	Sautner 2', 40' (pen.) Fellanxa 90'	Attendance: 2,500; Referee: Moritz Kühlmeyer

=== To the Oberliga ===
The runners-up of the Rheinlandliga, Verbandsliga Südwest and Saarlandliga played each other for one more spot in the Oberliga which SV Mehring won.

30 May 2015	SV Mehring	6–1	SV Bübingen
16:00		Report		Attendance: 500

3 June 2015	SV Bübingen	1–1	Alemannia Waldalgesheim
19:00		Report		Attendance: 420

7 June 2015	Alemannia Waldalgesheim	1–1	SV Mehring
15:00		Report
