= FSV Salmrohr =

German football club

- Full name: Fußballsportverein Salmrohr 1921 e.V.
- Founded: 1921
- Ground: Salmtalstadion
- Capacity: 10,000
- League: Rheinlandliga (VI)
- 2019–20: 3rd
Home colours	Away colours

FSV Salmrohr is a German association football club in the village of Salmrohr, Rhineland-Palatinate. Founded in 1921, the small club has limited resources and has relied largely on local talent, but still managed two decades of play in the tier III Amateur Oberliga Südwest and Regionalliga West/Südwest and earned a national amateur title in 1990.

== History ==
In 1925, they became part of the Deutschen Jugendkraft, a Catholic-sponsored national league, playing as DJK Salmrohr/Dörbach. The modern-day side was formed following World War II in 1946 as SV Salmrohr. It was renamed Fussball Club Salmrohr 1946 the following year and took on the name Fußballsportverein Salmrohr/Dörbach in 1957.

Through the 1980s and 1990s, FSV was as an upper table side in third division play and earned a single season promotion to the 2. Bundesliga in the 1986–87 following their qualification round win over SSV Ulm 1846. In 1990, they beat Rheydter SV 2:0 to claim the national amateur championship. The team again qualified for promotion play following their 1992 Oberliga title, but were beaten by Wuppertaler SV. Between 1992 and 1996, Salmrohr captured five consecutive regional cup titles, however, in the late-1990s the club's performances began to tail off and they slipped to lower-level competition.

An attempt to give Eintracht Trier a boost into the 2.Bundesliga in 1997 through a partial union that saw a number of Salmrohr's footballers go to Trier failed. The next year the club only escaped relegation because a pair of teams that finished ahead of them were denied licenses due to their financial problems. By the turn of the millennium Salmrohr was playing in the Oberliga Südwest as a fourth division side.

Most recently the team drifted between the Oberliga Südwest and the Rheinlandliga, winning another promotion in 2011 and finishing sixth in the Oberliga in 2012. From 2012–13 the Oberliga Südwest was renamed Oberliga Rheinland-Pfalz/Saar, with Salmrohr continuing in this league. It came second in the league in 2013 and 2014 and narrowly missed out on promotion when it lost to FC Nöttingen in the newly introduced promotion round of the Oberliga runners-up.

== Honours ==
The club's honours:

=== League ===
- German amateur championship
  - Winners: 1990
- Oberliga Rheinland-Pfalz/Saar (III)
  - Champions: 1985, 1992
  - Runners-up: 2013, 2014
- Rheinlandliga (VI)
  - Champions: 2011
  - Runners-up: 2005, 2006, 2009

=== Cup ===
- Rhineland Cup (Tiers III-VII)
  - Winners: 1989, 1992, 1993, 1994, 1995, 1996, 2002, 2015, 2019
  - Runners-up: 1983, 1984, 1986, 1988

== Recent seasons ==
The recent season-by-season performance of the club:

Season	Division	Tier	Position
1999–2000	Regionalliga West/Südwest	III	19th ↓
2000–01	Oberliga Südwest	IV	5th
2001–02	Oberliga Südwest	IV	3rd
2002–03	Oberliga Südwest	IV	5th
2003–04	Oberliga Südwest	IV	16th ↓
2004–05	Rheinlandliga	V	2nd
2005–06	Rheinlandliga	V	2nd ↑
2006–07	Oberliga Südwest	IV	15th ↓
2007–08	Rheinlandliga	V	6th
2008–09	Rheinlandliga	VI	2nd
2009–10	Rheinlandliga	VI	4th
2010–11	Rheinlandliga	VI	1st ↑
2011–12	Oberliga Südwest	V	6th
2012–13	Oberliga Rheinland-Pfalz/Saar	V	2nd
2013–14	Oberliga Rheinland-Pfalz/Saar	V	2nd
2014–15	Oberliga Rheinland-Pfalz/Saar	V	7th
2015–16	Oberliga Rheinland-Pfalz/Saar	V	9th
2016–17	Oberliga Rheinland-Pfalz/Saar	V	15th
2017–18	Oberliga Rheinland-Pfalz/Saar	V	17th ↓
2018–19	Rheinlandliga	VI	14th
2019–20	Rheinlandliga	VI	3rd

- With the introduction of the Regionalligas in 1994 and the 3. Liga in 2008 as the new third tier, below the 2. Bundesliga, all leagues below dropped one tier. In 2012 the Oberliga Südwest was renamed Oberliga Rheinland-Pfalz/Saar.

↑ Promoted	↓ Relegated
