= SV Saar 05 Saarbrücken =

German sports club

- Full name: Sportverein Saar 05 Saarbrücken e.V.
- Founded: 1905; 121 years ago
- Ground: Kieselhumes
- Capacity: 13,000
- Chairman: Frank Seibert
- Manager: Timon Seibert
- League: Saarlandliga (VI)
- 2017–18: Oberliga Rheinland-Pfalz/Saar (V), 18th (relegated)
- Website: http://www.svsaar05.de/
| Home colours | Away colours |

SV Saar 05 Saarbrücken is a German sports association based in Saarbrücken, Saarland. The largest club in the state, it is best known for its athletics department, and also fields an association football team.

== History ==
The club was founded as Fussball Klub Saarbrücken on 8 May 1905 and within three months was re-christened Sport-Club Saar 05 Saarbrücken. From 1919, the club played in the Kreisliga Saar, where it took out a championship in 1920, thereby advancing to the Southern German championship where it got knocked out in the group stage. In October 1933 SC joined Spielverein 05 Saarbrücken, which was itself the product of the 1919 union of 1. FC Germania 1905 and SpVgg 1906, to become SV Saar 05 Saarbrücken. The club made a single season appearance in the first division Gauliga Südwest in 1934–35 and was immediately relegated after a last place finish. SV merged with Deutscher SC in 1939 to become Deutscher SV Saar 05.

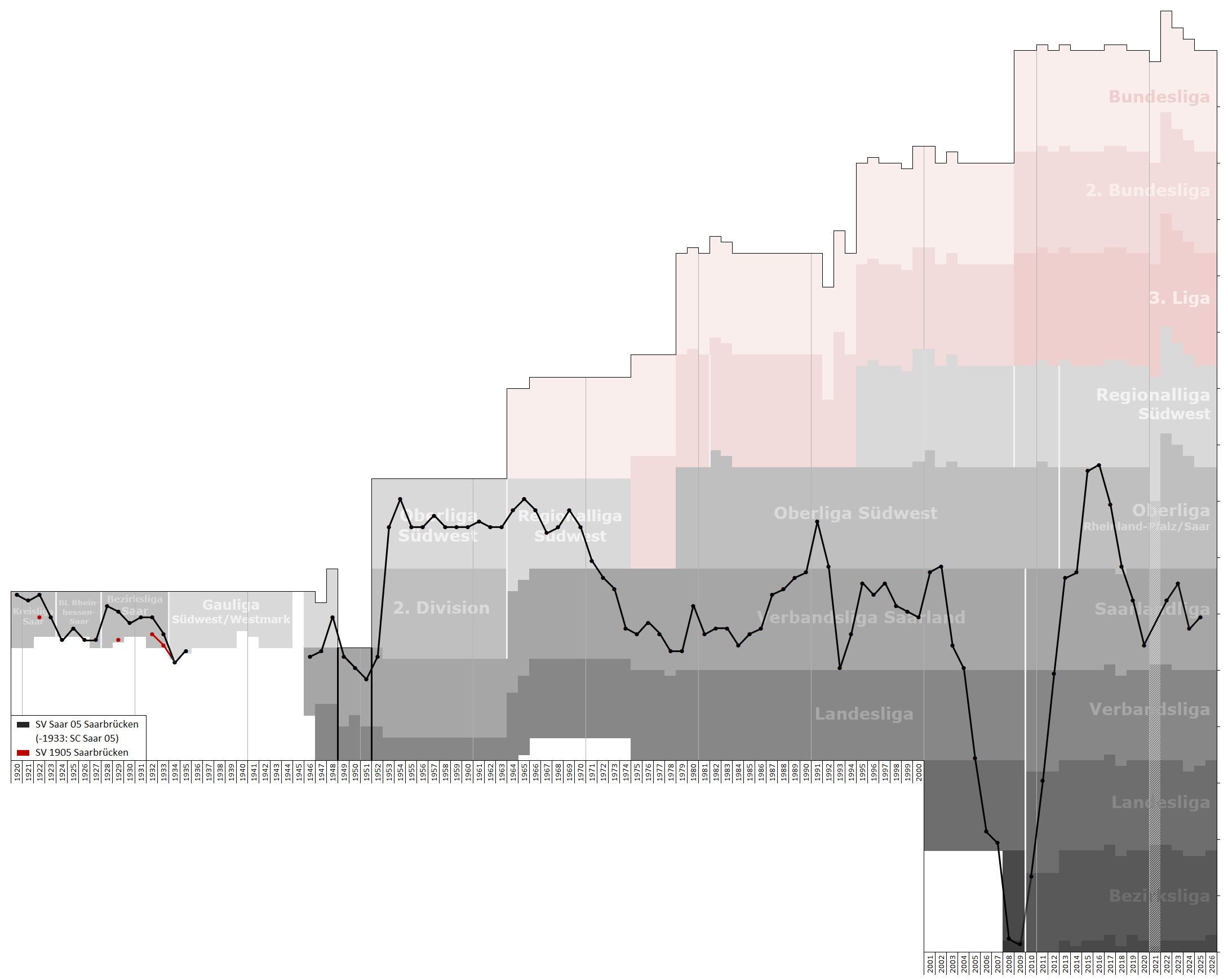
Historical chart of SV Saar 05 league performance

After World War II occupying Allied authorities ordered the dissolution of all organizations in Germany, including sports and football associations. In late 1945 the club was re-established as SV Saarbrücken, becoming SV Saar Saarbrücken in 1949, and SV Saar 05 Saarbrücken in 1951. In post-war football the club played in the tier one Oberliga Südwest in 1947–48 and from 1952 to 1963, when the Bundesliga was established. Sara's best result in this era was a fourth place in 1953–54, a place above local rival 1. FC Saarbrücken. The club did not qualify for the new Bundesliga but instead was grouped in the second division Regionalliga Südwest, where it played until 1971. Again a fourth place was the club's best performance at this level, achieved in 1964–65. With relegation from this league to the Amateurliga Saarland in 1971 the club disappeared from the highest levels of the German league system for good. After some good results at this level the club gradually declined and was unable to qualify for the new tier three Oberliga Südwest in 1978 and played in the Verbandsliga Saarland instead. Saar 05 played as a lower table side in this league, too until the late 1980s when fortunes improved for the club. A league championship took it up to the Oberliga for two seasons but it was relegated again in 1992.

After another nine Verbandsliga seasons the club won the league in 2001, thereby gaining promotion to the Oberliga Südwest. Saar 05 lasted for only one more season in the Oberliga and, after that, went into decline, dropping from the tier four Oberliga to the tier ten Kreisliga B within eight seasons. In August 2007, the youth department formed a new club, the SV Saar 05 Jugendfußball, due to internal strife in the club.

The 2007–08 season was an absolute low point in the club's long history. The coach, Roland Hippchen, used 18 non-registered players during the season and found himself barred from coaching by the Saar FA. He continued to coach the club nevertheless and upon this, the club too was eventually barred from competing in the Kreisliga A Halberg. With a new team under a new coach, Timon Seibert, the club entered the Kreisliga B Saarbrücken for 2008–09, hoping to improve its fortunes, under the guidance of the SV Saar 05 Jugendfußball, the Kreisliga B being the lowest tier in Saarland football.

Saar 05 began climbing the ranks again quickly to the point where the club played in the states highest football league for two seasons, now the Saarlandliga, winning a league championship in 2014 and earning promotion to the Oberliga Rheinland-Pfalz/Saar. The club won a championship in the Oberliga in the following season, thereby earning promotion to the tier four Regionalliga Südwest, a league local rival 1. FC Saarbrücken played in as well. The club's six promotions in seven seasons were achieved under the leadership of the Seifert family, with Frank Seibert as the chairman of the club while his sons Timon and Eric worked as coaches and their brother David played for the team. SV Saar 05 came last in the Regionalliga in 2015–16 and was relegated back to the Oberliga again.

== Honors ==
The club's honours:

=== League ===
- Kreisliga Saar (I)
  - Champions: 1920
- Oberliga Rheinland-Pfalz/Saar (V)
  - Champions: 2015
- Saarlandliga (VI)
  - Champions: 2014
  - Runners-up: 2013
- Verbandsliga Saarland (VII)
  - Champions: 1990, 2001, 2012
- Bezirksliga Saarbrücken (IX)
  - Champions: 2010
- Kreisliga B Saarbrücken (X)
  - Champions: 2009

=== Cup ===
- Saarland Cup (Tiers III-VII)
- Winners: 1988, 1989
- Runners-up: 1977, 1978

== Recent seasons ==
The recent season-by-season performance of the club:

| Season | Division | Tier | Position |
|---|---|---|---|
| 1999–2000 | Verbandsliga Saarland | V | 9th |
| 2000–01 | Verbandsliga Saarland | V | 1st ↑ |
| 2001–02 | Oberliga Südwest | IV | 18th ↓ |
| 2002–03 | Verbandsliga Saarland | V | 14th |
| 2003–04 | Verbandsliga Saarland | V | 18th ↓ |
| 2004–05 | Landesliga Saarland-Südwest | VI | 16th ↓^{†} |
| 2005–06 | Bezirksliga Saarland-Süd | VII | 13th |
| 2006–07 | Bezirksliga Saarland-Süd | VII | 15th ↓ |
| 2007–08 | Kreisliga A Halberg | VIII | 16th ↓ |
| 2008–09 | Kreisliga B Saarbrücken | X | 1st ↑ |
| 2009–10 | Bezirksliga Saarbrücken | IX | 1st ↑ |
| 2010–11 | Landesliga Saarland-Südwest | VIII | 2nd ↑ |
| 2011–12 | Verbandsliga Saarland | VII | 1st ↑ |
| 2012–13 | Saarlandliga | VI | 2nd |
| 2013–14 | Saarlandliga | VI | 1st ↑ |
| 2014–15 | Oberliga Rheinland-Pfalz/Saar | V | 1st ↑ |
| 2015–16 | Regionalliga Südwest | IV | 18th ↓ |
| 2016–17 | Oberliga Rheinland-Pfalz/Saar | V | 7th |
| 2017–18 | Oberliga Rheinland-Pfalz/Saar | V | 18th ↓ |
| 2018–19 | Saarlandliga | VI | 6th |
| 2019-20 | Saarlandliga | VI | 14th |
| 2020-21 | Saarlandliga | VI | 11th |
| 2021-22 | Saarlandliga | VI | |
| 2022-23 | Saarlandliga | VI | |
| 2023-24 | | | |
| 2024-25 | | | |
| 2025-26 | | | |

- With the introduction of the Regionalligas in 1994 and the 3. Liga in 2008 as the new third tier, below the 2. Bundesliga, all leagues below dropped one tier.
- ^{†} Saar 05 did not play the season and was therefore placed last and relegated.

=== Key ===
| ↑ Promoted | ↓ Relegated |
