= SV Röchling Völklingen =

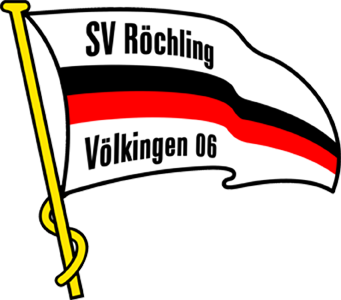
- Full name: Sportverein Röchling Völklingen 06 e.V.
- Founded: 1906
- Ground: Hermann-Neuberger-Stadion
- Capacity: 12,000
- Manager: Tim Schwartz
- League: Oberliga Rheinland-Pfalz/Saar (V)
- 2020–21 (Staffel Süd): 7nd
Home colours	Away colours

SV Röchling Völklingen is a German association football club that plays in Völklingen, part of the greater Saarbrücken, Saarland.

The club draws its name from the Röchling family, owners of the Völklingen Ironworks steel factory, a former sponsor of the club which closed down in 1986.

== History ==
The club was founded as FC Völklingen on 26 April 1906 and renamed SV Völklingen in 1912 before folding in 1916 as a consequence of the fighting along the frontier with France in World War I. In 1919 the club was re-founded as VfB Völklingen and played in the Kreisliga Saar, before taking on its old name again later in the year. Like most organizations across Germany, including sports and football teams, SVV was dissolved after World War II at the direction of the occupying Allied authorities.

Reconstituted after the war as SuSG Völklingen, the club suffered through an unsuccessful 1947–48 season in the Oberliga Südwest, before playing for three seasons from 1949 to 1951 in the Ehrenliga Saarland, a rump football league established by the occupying French authorities as a manifestation in sport of a more general attempt to have the German state of Saarland join France or become a separate country. This affected a number of German clubs and resulted in Saarland being represented by separate teams in the Olympics and the 1954 World Cup. Renamed SV Völklingen in 1951 the team played the balance of the postwar period in the Amateurliga Saarland (III) until advancing to the 2nd Oberliga Südwest in 1961.

With the formation in 1963 of the Bundesliga, Germany's new top-flight professional league, and the related restructuring of the country's football leagues, Völklingen found itself in the Regionalliga Südwest (II). The team enjoyed its greatest successes in the early-1970s when it earned second-place finishes in the 1972 and 1973 seasons, but was unable to advance in two related attempts through the promotion rounds to the Bundesliga. The club also advanced to the quarter-finals of the 1975–76 German Cup before bowing out to Hertha BSC Berlin 2–1 in a replay. Through the latter part of the decade the club struggled to avoid relegation, but had already begun a descent that would take them as far down as the Landesliga Saarland-SW (VI) by 1994. SV Völklingen currently play in the Oberliga Rheinland-Pfalz/Saar (V).

== Current squad ==
As of April 18, 2026

Goalkeepers

- Germany Luca Reiter
- Germany Egehan Dinc
- Germany David Schwinn

Defenders

- Germany Samir Belkesam
- France Abdelilah Chabab
- Germany Tyler De Weze
- Germany Serkan Geldi
- Germany Lennox David Schleipfer
- Germany Jonathan Steil

Midfielders

- Germany Oliver Abt
- Germany Massimo Cremone
- Germany Guiliano Faletta
- Italy Lupo Giulio
- Germany Emre Gülün
- Germany Maximilian Hans
- Germany Kevin Hermann
- Germany Veysel Karakök
- Germany Mark Kiefer
- (Germany) Jovial Kulemfuka

Forwards

- Syria Aous Alibrahim
- Syria Bashar Ausha Ammo
- France Christophe Birgensler
- Morocco Abderrahim Faouzi
- Germany Raik Köhler
- Syria Abdul Malek Obeid
- Germany Niclas Platte

== Stadium ==
Völklingen's Hermann Neuberger Stadium was built in 1912 and had a grandstand added in 1955. Its capacity was doubled to accommodate 16,000 spectators when the club joined the 2. Bundesliga in 1974, making it the fourth largest stadium in Saarland.

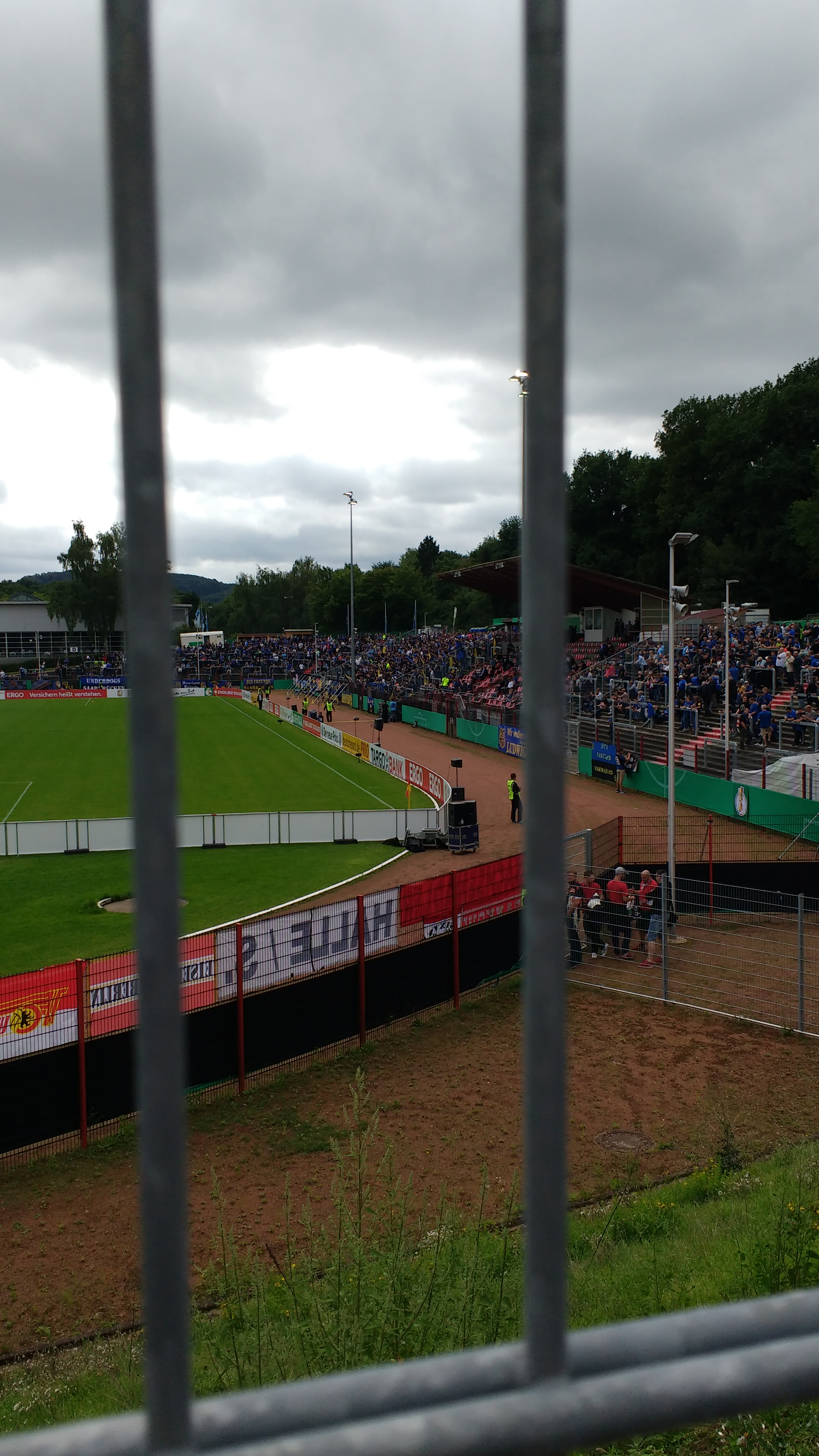
Hermann-Neuberger Stadion

== Honours ==
The club's honours:

- Oberliga Südwest (III)
  - Champions: 1979
- Amateurliga Saarland (III)
  - Champions: 1960, 1961
- Verbandsliga Saarland (IV–V)
  - Champions: 1983, 2002
- Saarlandliga (VI)
  - Champions: 2011

== Recent seasons ==
The recent season-by-season performance of the club:

Season	Division	Tier	Position
1999–2000	Verbandsliga Saarland	V	2nd
2000–01	Verbandsliga Saarland	V	2nd
2001–02	Verbandsliga Saarland	V	1st ↑
2002–03	Oberliga Südwest	IV	17th ↓
2003–04	Verbandsliga Saarland	V	5th
2004–05	Verbandsliga Saarland	V	4th
2005–06	Verbandsliga Saarland	V	2nd
2006–07	Verbandsliga Saarland	V	12th
2007–08	Verbandsliga Saarland	V	15th
2008–09	Verbandsliga Saarland	VI	7th
2009–10	Saarlandliga	VI	2nd
2010–11	Saarlandliga	VI	1st ↑
2011–12	Oberliga Südwest	V	13th
2012–13	Oberliga Rheinland-Pfalz/Saar	V	10th
2013–14	Oberliga Rheinland-Pfalz/Saar	V	14th
2014–15	Oberliga Rheinland-Pfalz/Saar	V	5th
2015–16	Oberliga Rheinland-Pfalz/Saar	V	7th
2016–17	Oberliga Rheinland-Pfalz/Saar	V	2nd ↑
2017–18	Regionalliga Südwest	IV	19th ↓
2018–19	Oberliga Rheinland-Pfalz/Saar	V	2nd
2019–20	Oberliga Rheinland-Pfalz/Saar	V	12nd
2020–21	Oberliga Rheinland-Pfalz/Saar	V	7nd

- With the introduction of the Regionalligas in 1994 and the 3. Liga in 2008 as the new third tier, below the 2. Bundesliga, all leagues below dropped one tier. The Saarlandliga was introduced in 2009 and replaced the Verbandsliga Saarland at the sixth tier of football in the Saarland. In 2012 the Oberliga Südwest was renamed Oberliga Rheinland-Pfalz/Saar.

↑ Promoted	↓ Relegated
