= Saarland Cup =

- Founded: 1974
- Region: Saarland, Germany
- Qualifier for: DFB-Pokal
- Current champions: 1. FC Saarbrücken (2025–26)
- Most championships: 1. FC Saarbrücken (12 titles)

The Saarland Cup (German: Saarlandpokal) is one of the 21 regional cup competitions of German football. The winner of the competition gains entry to the first round of the German Cup. It is limited to clubs from Saarland, however, teams from the Bundesliga and 2. Bundesliga are not permitted to compete.

A number of clubs from regions of Rhineland-Palatinate who border the Saarland also compete in the Cup, best known of these being the SV Hasborn who has won the cup twice.

== History ==
The Cup was established in 1974. The Saarland Cup is played annually. Previous to the Saarpokal, a South West German Cup, not to be confused with the South West Cup, was played from 1964 to 1974. It was also a qualifying competition for the German Cup but included clubs from both the Saarland and Rhineland-Palatinate.

The winner of the Saarland Cup qualified for the first round of the German Cup.

Since the establishment of the 3rd Liga in 2008, reserve teams can not take part in the German Cup anymore, but are permitted to play in the regional competitions.

== Modus ==
Clubs from fully professional leagues are not permitted to enter the competition, meaning, no teams from the Bundesliga and the 2. Bundesliga can compete.

All clubs from the Saarland playing in the 3. Liga (III), Regionalliga West (IV), Oberliga Südwest (V), Verbandsliga Saarland (VI) and the two Landesligas (VII) gain direct entry to the first round. All clubs below that level play two preliminary rounds in four regional groups. The lower classed team always receives home advantage, except in the final, which is played on neutral ground.

== Cup finals ==
Held annually at the end of season, these were the cup finals since 1975:

Season	Location	Winner	Finalist	Result	Attendance
1974–75	Eppelborn	SC Friedrichsthal	SV Hasborn	4–3	2,500
1975–76	Friedrichsthal	VfB Theley	FC Ensdorf	3–1 aet	800
1976–77	Neunkirchen	FC St.Wendel	Saar 05 Saarbrücken	1–0	1,000
1977–78	Eppelborn	Borussia Neunkirchen	Saar 05 Saarbrücken	5–1	200
1978–79	Friedrichsthal	SV Auersmacher	SV Elversberg	2–2 aet, 4–3 pen	3,500
1979–80	Saarwellingen	ASC Dudweiler	FSV Hemmersdorf	7–2	1,200
1980–81	Burbach	ASC Dudweiler	SSV Überherrn	3–2 aet	1,500
1981–82	Saarwellingen	FC Ensdorf	SV Elversberg	1–0	1,500
1982–83	Neunkirchen	FC Homburg	1. FC Saarbrücken	4–3	3,000
1983–84	Hülzweiler	SV Mettlach	ASC Dudweiler	5–4 aet	2,000
1984–85	Quierschied	Borussia Neunkirchen	SV Auersmacher	6–0	1,200
1985–86	Quierschied	Borussia Neunkirchen	FV Eppelborn	1–1 aet, 5–4 pen	2,000
1986–87	Eppelborn	FC St. Ingbert	VfB Dillingen	2–1	750
1987–88	Dillingen	Saar 05 Saarbrücken	SV Mettlach	4–0	2,000
1988–89	Neunkirchen	Saar 05 Saarbrücken	SV Röchling Völklingen	3–2	600
1989–90	Völklingen	Borussia Neunkirchen	SV Ludweiler	6–0	1,500
1990–91	Dillingen	SV Hasborn	VfB Gisingen	3–1 aet	3,000
1991–92	Oberthal	Borussia Neunkirchen	SV Hasborn	2–1	2,500
1992–93	Dillingen	SV Mettlach	SV Ludweiler	1–0	2,000
1993–94	Ensdorf	SC Großrosseln	FSV Saarwellingen	3–2	2,200
1994–95	Eppelborn	SV Mettlach	Borussia Neunkirchen	3–1 aet	2,600
1995–96	Rohrbach	Borussia Neunkirchen	FC Homburg	2–1	3,000
1996–97	Dillingen	1. FC Saarbrücken	Borussia Neunkirchen	3–1	4,000
1997–98	Völklingen	1. FC Saarbrücken	FC Homburg	3–0	3,200
1998–99	Saarbrücken	1. FC Saarbrücken	SC Halberg–Brebach	5–1	2,000
1999–2000	Dillingen	1. FC Saarbrücken	SC Halberg–Brebach	5–3	1,800
2000–01	Elversberg	FC Homburg	Borussia Neunkirchen	4–2	3,000
2001–02	Hasborn	1. FC Saarbrücken II	FV Eppelborn	3–1	1,500
2002–03	Elversberg	Borussia Neunkirchen	FC Homburg	1–0	5,000
2003–04	Neunkirchen	1. FC Saarbrücken	SV Elversberg	3–1	4,000
2004–05	Schiffweiler	FC Kutzhof	1. FC Saarbrücken II	4–4 aet, 7–6 pen	1,800
2005–06	Großrosseln	FC Homburg	FC Kutzhof	3–1 aet	2,000
2006–07	Theley	SV Hasborn	FC Homburg	3–3 aet, 4–1 pen	3,500
2007–08	Elversberg	FC Homburg	Borussia Neunkirchen	2–1 aet	3,800
2008–09	Bous	SV Elversberg	SC Reisbach	7–0	2,500
2009–10	St. Wendel	SV Elversberg	Borussia Neunkirchen	1–0	2,500
2010–11	Dillingen	1. FC Saarbrücken	SV Mettlach	3–2	5,400
2011–12	Dillingen, 2 May 2012	1. FC Saarbrücken	SV Rot–Weiß Hasborn	2–1	3,800
2012–13	Hasborn, 29 May 2013	1. FC Saarbrücken	FC Hertha Wiesbach	4–0	3,500
2013–14	Völklingen, 7 May 2014	FC 08 Homburg	SV Elversberg	2–0	
2014–15	Rehlingen, 13 May 2015	SV Elversberg	FC 08 Homburg	2–1 aet	4,000
2015–16	Dillingen, 4 May 2016	FC 08 Homburg	SV Elversberg	1–0	
2016–17	Homburg, 25 May 2017	1. FC Saarbrücken	SV Elversberg	3–2	
2017–18	Elversberg, 21 May 2018	SV Elversberg	1. FC Saarbrücken	1–0	
2018–19	Elversberg, 25 May 2019	1. FC Saarbrücken	SV Elversberg	2–1	6,213
2019–20	Elversberg	SV Elversberg	FC 08 Homburg	2–2 aet, 5–4 pen	0
2020–21	Elversberg	SV Elversberg	1. FC Saarbrücken	1–0	0
2021–22	Saarbrücken	SV Elversberg	FC 08 Homburg	2–1 aet	
2022–23	Saarbrücken	SV Elversberg	1. FC Saarbrücken	3–2 aet	
2023–24	Saarbrücken	1. FC Saarbrücken	FC 08 Homburg	2–1	
2024–25	Saarbrücken	FC 08 Homburg	Palatia Limbach	9–0	
205–26	Saarbrücken	1. FC Saarbrücken	FC 08 Homburg	4–2	12,410

- Winners in **bold**

== Winners ==
Listed in order of wins, the Cup winners are:

Club	Wins
1. FC Saarbrücken ^{1}	12
SV Elversberg	8
Borussia Neunkirchen	7
FC 08 Homburg	7
SV Mettlach	3
SV Hasborn	2
Saar 05 Saarbrücken	2
ASC Dudweiler	2
FC Kutzhof	1
SC Großrosseln	1
FC St. Ingbert	1
FC Ensdorf	1
SV Auersmacher	1
FC St.Wendel	1
VfB Theley	1
SC Friedrichsthal	1

- ^{1} Includes one win by reserve team, 1. FC Saarbrücken II.
