= 1. FC Kaiserslautern II =

- Full name: 1. Fußball-Club Kaiserslautern e. V.
- Founded: 2 June 1900 (club)
- Ground: Sportpark Rote Teufel
- Manager: Alexander Bugera
- League: Regionalliga Südwest
- 2025–26: Oberliga Rheinland-Pfalz/Saar, 1st of 18 (promoted)
Home colours	Away colours	Third colours

1. FC Kaiserslautern II is the reserve team of German association football club 1. FC Kaiserslautern, based in Kaiserslautern, Rhineland-Palatinate. The team competes in the Regionalliga Südwest, the fourth tier of German football. Prior 2005, the team was named 1. FC Kaiserslautern Amateure.

The team has reached the first round of the DFB-Pokal, the German Cup, on three occasions, advancing to the second round twice as its best-ever result. The team has played as high as the Regionalliga, courtesy to league titles in the Oberliga Südwest.

== History ==
1. FC Kaiserslautern Amateure made a first appearance in the third-tier Amateurliga Südwest in 1957. They won the championship in 1960 and 1968, but were not entitled to promotion to professional level. In the intervening seasons, Kaiserslautern Amateure were often fighting for relegation rather than the league championship, with their best finishes being runners-up in 1970 and 1973. The latter allowed the team entry to the German amateur football championship, where they lost 1–0 to SpVgg Bad Homburg in the final.

In 1978, when the Oberliga Südwest was introduced, Kaiserslautern Amateure qualified for this new league which it would belong to, with the exception of the 1982–83 season, until 1992. They won promotion back to the Oberliga in 1983 and 1994 with titles in the Verbandsliga Südwest. The team became a yo-yo team between the Oberliga and the Regionalliga, a league newly introduced in 1994. They played in the Regionalliga West/Südwest until 2000, in the Regionalliga Süd in 2007, and the Regionalliga West until 2012. Kaiserslautern II had its best Regionalliga result in the latter, when they finished as runners-up in 2009. In between, the team was relegated from the Regionalliga in 1996, 2000, 2004 and 2007, but won promotion back to the league each time.

In 2012, Kaiserslautern II became part of the new Regionalliga Südwest, where they competed until 2017 when they were relegated to the fifth-tier Oberliga Rheinland-Pfalz/Saar.

Kaiserslautern II have also won the Southwestern Cup on three occasions, in 1979, 1997 and 2008, as well as having made a number of losing final appearances. Through this competition, the club qualified for the German Cup on three occasions: 1979–80, 1981–82 and 1997–98. They reached the second round twice and were also drawn against their own first team in the 1997–98 season, losing 5–0.

== Honours ==
1. FC Kaiserslautern II honours
Honour	No.	Years
Amateurliga Südwest	2	1959–60, 1967–68
Oberliga Südwest / Oberliga Rheinland-Pfalz/Saar	4	1994–95, 1996–97, 2000–01, 2025–26
Verbandsliga Südwest	2	1982–83, 1993–94
Southwestern Cup	3	1978–79, 1996–97, 2007–08

== Seasons ==
The season-by-season performance of the club:

=== Key ===
↑ Promoted	↓ Relegated

Season	Division	Tier	Position
2000–01	Oberliga Südwest	4	1st↑
2001–02	Regionalliga Süd	3	15th
2002–03	Regionalliga Süd	3	13th
2003–04	Regionalliga Süd	3	18th↓
2004–05	Oberliga Südwest	4	2nd↑
2005–06	Regionalliga Süd	3	13th
2006–07	Regionalliga Süd	3	18th↓
2007–08	Oberliga Südwest	4	2nd↑
2008–09	Regionalliga West	4	2nd
2009–10	Regionalliga West	4	8th
2010–11	Regionalliga West	4	4th
2011–12	Regionalliga West	4	9th
2012–13	Regionalliga Südwest	4	3rd
2013–14	Regionalliga Südwest	4	4th
2014–15	Regionalliga Südwest	4	4th
2015–16	Regionalliga Südwest	4	10th
2016–17	Regionalliga Südwest	4	16th↓
2017–18	Oberliga Rheinland-Pfalz/Saar	5	3rd
2018–19	Oberliga Rheinland-Pfalz/Saar	5	9th
2019–20	Oberliga Rheinland-Pfalz/Saar	5	2nd (Note: Not finished due to the COVID-19 pandemic.)
2020–21	Oberliga Rheinland-Pfalz/Saar	5	2nd
2021–22	Oberliga Rheinland-Pfalz/Saar	5	15th
2022–23	Oberliga Rheinland-Pfalz/Saar	5	7th
2023–24	Oberliga Rheinland-Pfalz/Saar	5	4th
2024–25	Oberliga Rheinland-Pfalz/Saar	5	2nd
2025–26	Oberliga Rheinland-Pfalz/Saar	5	1st↑

- With the introduction of the Regionalligas in 1994 and the 3. Liga in 2008 as the new third tier, below the 2. Bundesliga, all leagues below dropped one tier. In 2012, the number of Regionalligas was increased from three to five with all Regionalliga Süd clubs except the Bavarian ones entering the new Regionalliga Südwest.
