= SVN Zweibrücken =

German football club

- Full name: Sportverein Niederauerbach 1929 Zweibrücken e.V.
- Founded: 1929
- Ground: Westpfalzstadion
- Chairman: Marco Weigl
- Manager: Franko Mayr
- League: B-Klasse Pirmasens-Zweibrücken (X)
- 2015–16: Oberliga Rheinland-Pfalz/Saar (V), 18th (withdrawn)
Home colours	Away colours

SVN Zweibrücken is a German association football club from the Niederauerbach quarter of Zweibrücken, Rhineland-Palatinate.

== History ==
The association was founded in 1929 as SV Niederauerbach and remained an anonymous local side until winning its way to the Verbandsliga Südwest (V). A decade later the team captured the division title and was promoted to the Oberliga Südwest (V). SV also advanced to the finals of the Südwest Pokal (South West Cup) in that successful 2007–08 season, which earned the club a place in the DFB-Pokal (German Cup) tournament in 2008–09. In June 2009 the club changed its name to SVN Zweibrücken.

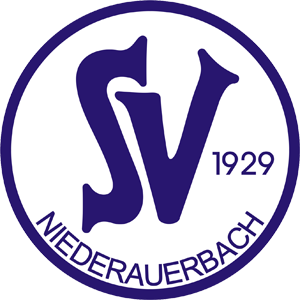
Logo of SV Niederauerbach until 2009.

Since entering the Oberliga Südwest in 2008 the team has achieved good results, culminating in a second-place finish in 2011–12. From 2012 to 2013 the Oberliga Südwest was renamed Oberliga Rheinland-Pfalz/Saar, with SVN Zweibrücken taking out the league title in its inaugural season and earning promotion to the Regionalliga Südwest. After a seventh-place finish in the league in 2014 the club came last in the following season and was relegated back to the Oberliga.

In December 2015 the club announced that it would not pay its players any more and had not done so since October. The club was in danger of becoming insolvent and had been lingering at the bottom of the table. In January 2016 the club withdrew its team from the Oberliga and restarted in one of the 10th-tier leagues below, the B-Klasse Pirmasens-Zweibrücken, for the following season by forming a joint team with FC Oberauerbach.

== Honours ==
The club's honours:

=== League ===
- Oberliga Rheinland-Pfalz/Saar
  - Champions: 2013
  - Runners-up: 2012
- Verbandsliga Südwest (V)
  - Champions: 2008
  - Runners-up: 2002

=== Cup ===
- South West Cup
  - Winners: 2011
  - Runners-up: 2008, 2014

== Recent seasons ==
The recent season-by-season performance of the club:

Season	Division	Tier	Position
1999–2000	Verbandsliga Südwest	V	3rd
2000–01	Verbandsliga Südwest	V	5th
2001–02	Verbandsliga Südwest	V	2nd
2002–03	Verbandsliga Südwest	V	3rd
2003–04	Verbandsliga Südwest	V	4th
2004–05	Verbandsliga Südwest	V	3rd
2005–06	Verbandsliga Südwest	V	4th
2006–07	Verbandsliga Südwest	V	6th
2007–08	Verbandsliga Südwest	V	1st ↑
2008–09	Oberliga Südwest	V	13th
2009–10	Oberliga Südwest	V	3rd
2010–11	Oberliga Südwest	V	5th
2011–12	Oberliga Südwest	V	2nd
2012–13	Oberliga Rheinland-Pfalz/Saar	V	1st ↑
2013–14	Regionalliga Südwest	IV	7th
2014–15	Regionalliga Südwest	IV	18th ↓
2015–16	Oberliga Rheinland-Pfalz/Saar	V	18th ↓
2016–17	B-Klasse Pirmasens/Zweibrücken	X	

- With the introduction of the Regionalligas in 1994 and the 3. Liga in 2008 as the new third tier, below the 2. Bundesliga, all leagues below dropped one tier. In 2012 the Oberliga Südwest was renamed Oberliga Rheinland-Pfalz/Saar.

=== Key ===
↑ Promoted	↓ Relegated
