= Verbandsliga Saarland =

- Founded: 1947
- Country: Germany
- State: Saarland
- Number of clubs: Nordost: 16; Südwest: 17
- Level on pyramid: Level 7
- Promotion to: Saarlandliga
- Relegation to: Landesliga Saarland-Nord; Landesliga Saarland-Ost; Landesliga Saarland-Süd; Landesliga Saarland-West
- Domestic cup: Saarland Cup
- Current champions: Nordost: SV Bliesmengen-Bolchen Südwest: FV Siersburg (2019–20)

The Verbandsliga Saarland is currently the seventh tier of the German football league system in the German federated state of Saarland. Until the introduction of the Saarlandliga in 2009 it was the sixth tier, until the introduction of the 3. Liga in 2008 it was the fifth tier of the league system, until the introduction of the Regionalligas in 1994 the fourth tier.

From the 2012-13 season onwards the league will be played in two regional divisions and the Landesligas below it increased in numbers from two to four.

== Overview ==
The Verbandsliga was formed in 1947 under the name of Ehrenliga Saarland in the state of Saarland. The league was originally a feeder league to the Oberliga Südwest. Due to the special situation of Saarland, its clubs left the German football league system from 1949 to 1951 with the 1. FC Saarbrücken playing a year in the French second division. From its return in 1951, now under the name of Amateurliga Saarland, until the establishment of the Oberliga Südwest in 1978, it was the third tier of the football league system.

The league was established in 1947 with ten teams, the winner gaining promotion to the Oberliga Südwest. The founder members were:

- FC 08 Homburg
- Sportfreunde Burbach
- FC Ensdorf
- SC Brebach
- Preußen Merchweiler
- FV Püttlingen
- SV Ludweiler
- ASC Dudweiler
- SV Bliekastel
- Hellas Marpingen
- Viktoria Hühnerfeld

With the return to the German league system in 1951, two teams from the league, now called Amateurliga Saarland were admitted to the Oberliga Südwest, the 1. FC Saarbrücken and Borussia Neunkirchen.

The year after, three clubs were admitted to the new 2nd Oberliga Südwest, the Viktoria Hühnerfeld, SC Altenkessel und Sportfreunde Saarbrücken.

The winner of the Amateurliga Saarland was not automatically promoted to its superior league but rather had to take part in a promotion play-off. The champion would have to compete with the winners of the Amateurligen Südwest and Rheinland.

With the introduction of the Bundesliga in 1963 the Amateurliga was placed below the new Regionalliga Südwest but still retained its third-tier status. It continued to do so after the introduction of the 2nd Bundesliga Süd in 1974.

In 1978, the same time as the Oberliga Südwest, the Amateurliga Saarland was renamed Verbandsliga Saarland and was now the fourth tier of the league system. The top seven teams out of the Amateurliga went to the new Oberliga while the teams from place 8 to 19 found themselves in the Verbandsliga.

The winner of the Verbandsliga Saarland, like the winners of the Verbandsligen Südwest and Rheinland gains direct promotion to the Oberliga Südwest. The runners-up will only get a chance for promotion when there are additional spots to fill in the Oberliga, like 1994 when the Regionalligen were introduced and VfB Dillingen was promoted.

The Saarland was the youngest of the states of West Germany, until 1957 it was a separate entity under French supervision. Its football league was temporarily separate, too. The clubs from the Saar did not play in the German football league system from 1948 to 1951.

Feeder Leagues to the Verbandsliga Saarland

- Landesliga Saarland-Nord
- Landesliga Saarland-Ost
- Landesliga Saarland-Süd
- Landesliga Saarland-West

In May 2008, the Saarland Football Association decided to change the league system by introducing the new Saarlandliga as the sixth tier, between Oberliga and Verbandsliga, from 2009. For the Verbandsliga, this meant, it would lose almost all its clubs to the new league and be relegated to seventh tier. Otherwise, it remained unchanged.

== League winners ==
The league champions in the single division era:

Season	Club
1947–48	**FC 08 Homburg**
1948–49	Borussia Neunkirchen
1949–50	Sportfreunde Saarbrücken
1950–51	**1. FC Saarbrücken**
1951–52	**Sportfreunde Saarbrücken**
1952–53	VfB Dillingen
1953–54	**SV Ludweiler**
1954–55	**SV St. Ingbert**
1955–56	**Viktoria Hühnerfeld**
1956–57	**FC 08 Homburg**
1957–58	**VfB Theley**
1958–59	**SC Friedrichsthal**
1959–60	Röchling Völklingen
1960–61	**Röchling Völklingen**
1961–62	SV Fraulautern
1962–63	Viktoria Sulzbach
1963–64	Viktoria Sulzbach
1964–65	SV Ludweiler
1965–66	**FC 08 Homburg**
1966–67	**SC Friedrichsthal**
1967–68	**SV Landsweiler–Reden**
1968–69	**SC Friedrichsthal**

Season	Club
1969–70	**VfB Theley**
1970–71	SV Fraulautern
1971–72	**VfB Theley**
1972–73	**FC Ensdorf**
1973–74	SV St. Ingbert
1974–75	ASC Dudweiler
1975–76	Borussia Neunkirchen
1976–77	Borussia Neunkirchen
1977–78	**Borussia Neunkirchen**
1978–79	**FC Ensdorf**
1979–80	**SV Elversberg**
1980–81	**Rot-Weiß Hasborn**
1981–82	**FC St. Wendel**
1982–83	**Röchling Völklingen**
1983–84	**FC Ensdorf**
1984–85	**FSV Saarwellingen**
1985–86	**SSV Überherrn**
1986–87	**Rot–Weiß Hasborn**
1987–88	**1. FC Saarbrücken II**
1988–89	**FSG Schiffweiler**
1989–90	**Saar 05 Saarbrücken**
1990–91	**FC 08 Homburg II**

Season	Club
1991–92	**FSG Schiffweiler**
1992–93	**SV Mettlach**
1993–94	**SV Elversberg**
1994–95	**SV Auersmacher**
1995–96	**SSV Überherrn**
1996–97	**SC 08 Halberg-Brebach**
1997–98	**1. FC Saarbrücken II**
1998–99	**VfB Theley**
1999–2000	**SV Mettlach**
2000–01	**Saar 05 Saarbrücken**
2001–02	**Röchling Völklingen**
2002–03	**Spfr. Köllerbach**
2003–04	**SC 08 Halberg-Brebach**
2004–05	**Rot–Weiß Hasborn**
2005–06	FC Kutzhof
2006–07	**Spfr. Köllerbach**
2007–08	**SV Elversberg II**
2008–09	**SV Auersmacher**
2009–10	**VfB Theley**
2010–11	**SpVgg Hangard**
2011–12	**Saar 05 Saarbrücken**

The league champions in the two division era:

Season	Nordost	Südwest
2012–13	VfL Primstal	SV Klarenthal
2013–14	Preussen Merchweiler	FSV Hemmersdorf
2014–15	DJK Bildstock	1. FC Riegelsberg
2015–16	FV Lebach	TuS Herrensohr
2016–17	FC 08 Homburg II	FV 09 Schwalbach
2017–18	SV Rohrbach	FC Rastpfuhl
2018–19	Rot-Weiß Hasborn	FV 09 Bischmisheim
2019–20	SV Bliesmengen-Bolchen	FV Siersburg

Source: "Verbandsliga saarland". Das deutsche Fussball–Archiv.

- **bold** denotes club gained promotion.
- VfB Dillingen (1994), Rot–Weiß Hasborn (1999), 1. FC Saarbrücken II (2002), TuS Steinbach (2015), FSG Bous (2017), SF Rehlingen (2018) and 1. FC Reimsbach (2019) were also promoted, finishing runners–up.
- FC Kutzhof withdrew from the league in 2006; no team from Saarland was promoted that year. The club's main sponsor withdrew its support and the team could not be financed to play in the Oberliga. Kutzhof withdrew on 10 July 2006. Had the withdrawal been done before 30 June, the runners–up of the league could have been promoted instead.
