= SC Hauenstein =

German football club

- Full name: Sport-Club Hauenstein 1919 e.V.
- Founded: 24 March 1919
- Ground: Stadion "Am Neding"
- Capacity: 4,000
- Chairman: Carl-August Seibel
- Manager: Jürgen Kohler
- League: Oberliga Rheinland-Pfalz/Saar (V)
- 2015–16: 2nd
Home colours	Away colours

SC Hauenstein is a German association football club from the municipality of Hauenstein, Rhineland-Palatinate.

== History ==
Sport-Club Hauenstein was established on 24 March 1919 at the "Gasthaus Zum Schwaninn". The club merged with DJK Hauenstein on 7 November 1930, but as a faith-based club, was banned in 1935 as politically undesirable under the Nazi regime.

A new association was formed in partnership with Turnverein Hauenstein following World War II on 26 June 1946 as Sport-Gemeinschaft Hauenstein. This was lost on 10 March 1950 and the membership of the defunct club immediately re-formed themselves on 17 March 1950 with SC and TV re-emerging as separate sides.

SC joined the third tier 2. Amateurliga Westpfalz and in 1960 won its way to the 1. Amateurliga Südwest (II). Following the establishment of the first division Bundesliga in 1963, lower division football in the country was reorganized. The Amateurliga Südwest became a third tier circuit (Verbandsliga) where Hauenstein competed until 1970, earning indifferent results until finally being sent down. The team remained in lower division play through the 70s and 80s and made a single season appearance in the Amateur Oberliga Südwest (III) in 1990–91. They returned to the AOL Südwest, which was now a fourth tier circuit, in 1993, and then became part of the Regionalliga West/Südwest (III) in a subsequent league restructuring. Hauenstein was relegated in 1997 to play in the Oberliga Südwest (IV). Generally a mid-table side, SC earned a second-place result in 2003 and finished third in 2005. In the 2012 the league was renamed Oberliga Rheinland-Pfalz/Saar with SCH continuing to achieve good results, culminating in a runners-up finish in 2015 and participation in the promotion round to the Regionalliga Südwest. After a draw and a loss the club missed out on promotion with Bahlinger SC promoted instead. In the following season the club once more failed in the Regionalliga promotion round after another runners-up finish in the Oberliga.

== Honours ==
The club's honours:

- Oberliga Südwest
  - Runners-up: 2003
- Verbandsliga Südwest
  - Champions: 1990, 1993
- South West Cup
  - Winners: 2016
- South West Indoor championship
  - Champions: 1987, 1993, 1994

== Recent seasons ==
The recent season-by-season performance of the club:

Season	Division	Tier	Position
1999–2000	Oberliga Südwest	IV	8th
2000–01	Oberliga Südwest	IV	13th
2001–02	Oberliga Südwest	IV	10th
2002–03	Oberliga Südwest	IV	2nd
2003–04	Oberliga Südwest	IV	8th
2004–05	Oberliga Südwest	IV	3rd
2005–06	Oberliga Südwest	IV	8th
2006–07	Oberliga Südwest	IV	8th
2007–08	Oberliga Südwest	IV	9th
2008–09	Oberliga Südwest	V	11th
2009–10	Oberliga Südwest	V	6th
2010–11	Oberliga Südwest	V	4th
2011–12	Oberliga Südwest	V	5th
2012–13	Oberliga Rheinland-Pfalz/Saar	V	3rd
2013–14	Oberliga Rheinland-Pfalz/Saar	V	3rd
2014–15	Oberliga Rheinland-Pfalz/Saar	V	2nd
2015–16	Oberliga Rheinland-Pfalz/Saar	V	2nd
2016–17	Oberliga Rheinland-Pfalz/Saar	V	

- With the introduction of the Regionalligas in 1994 and the 3. Liga in 2008 as the new third tier, below the 2. Bundesliga, all leagues below dropped one tier. In 2012 the Oberliga Südwest was renamed Oberliga Rheinland-Pfalz/Saar.

↑ Promoted	↓ Relegated
