= 1. FC Saarbrücken II =

- Full name: 1.Fußball-Club Saarbrücken e.V.
- Founded: 1903 (club)
- Ground: FC-Sportfeld
- Capacity: 15,000
- President: Hartmut Ostermann
- Manager: Sammer Mozain
- League: Kreisliga A Südsaar (X)
- 2014–15: Oberliga Rheinland-Pfalz/Saar (V), 15th ↓
Home colours	Away colours	Third colours

1. FC Saarbrücken II is the reserve team of German association football club 1. FC Saarbrücken, based in Saarbrücken, Saarland. Historically, until 2005, the team played as 1. FC Saarbrücken Amateure during the times the senior team played in professional football.

The team reached the first round of the DFB-Pokal, the German Cup, just once, in 2002–03. The team has played as high as the Oberliga Rheinland-Pfalz/Saar, courtesy to league titles in the Verbandsliga Saarland, than the highest football league in the state.

== History ==
The team first made an appearance in the Ehrenliga Saarland from 1948 to 1951 in place of the senior team which played, for a season, in the French second division and, after that, in a friendlies competition.

After a lengthy absence from the top division of the state it made a reappearance in 1986, now in the tier four Verbandsliga Saarland and won the league two seasons later in 1988. Nine seasons in the Oberliga Südwest, now the Oberliga Rheinland-Pfalz/Saar followed. The team was relegated from the Oberliga in 1997, 2001 and 2007 to return each time a short while later. In 2002 it won the Saarland Cup for the first and only time thereby qualifying for the first round of the 2002–03 German Cup where it lost to Arminia Bielefeld.

1. FC Saarbrücken II last played at Oberliga level since the last promotion in 2010, achieving a fourth-place finish as its best-ever result in 2013. At the end of the 2014–15 season the team was withdrawn by the club from competitive football, but was recreated in 2018, restarting in the tenth-division Kreisliga A.

== Honours ==
The team's honours:

- Ehrenliga Saarland
  - Champions: 1951
- Verbandsliga Saarland
  - Champions: (3) 1988, 1998, 2010
  - Runners-up: (2) 1987, 2002
- Saarland Cup
  - Winners: 2002
  - Runners-up: 2005

== Recent seasons ==
The recent season-by-season performance of the team:

Season	Division	Tier	Position
1999–2000	Oberliga Südwest	IV	11th
2000–01	Oberliga Südwest	IV	17th ↓
2001–02	Verbandsliga Saarland	V	2nd ↑
2002–03	Oberliga Südwest	IV	14th
2003–04	Oberliga Südwest	IV	5th
2004–05	Oberliga Südwest	IV	6th
2005–06	Oberliga Südwest	IV	5th
2006–07	Oberliga Südwest	IV	6th ↓
2007–08	Verbandsliga Saarland	V	4th
2008–09	Verbandsliga Saarland	VI	6th
2009–10	Verbandsliga Saarland	VI	1st ↑
2010–11	Oberliga Südwest	V	14th
2011–12	Oberliga Südwest	V	9th
2012–13	Oberliga Rheinland-Pfalz/Saar	V	4th
2013–14	Oberliga Rheinland-Pfalz/Saar	V	11th
2014–15	Oberliga Rheinland-Pfalz/Saar	V	17th (withdrawn)
2018–19	Kreisliga A Südsaar	X	TBD

- With the introduction of the Regionalligas in 1994 and the 3. Liga in 2008 as the new third tier, below the 2. Bundesliga, all leagues below dropped one tier.

=== Key ===
↑ Promoted	↓ Relegated
