= Oberliga Rheinland-Pfalz/Saar =

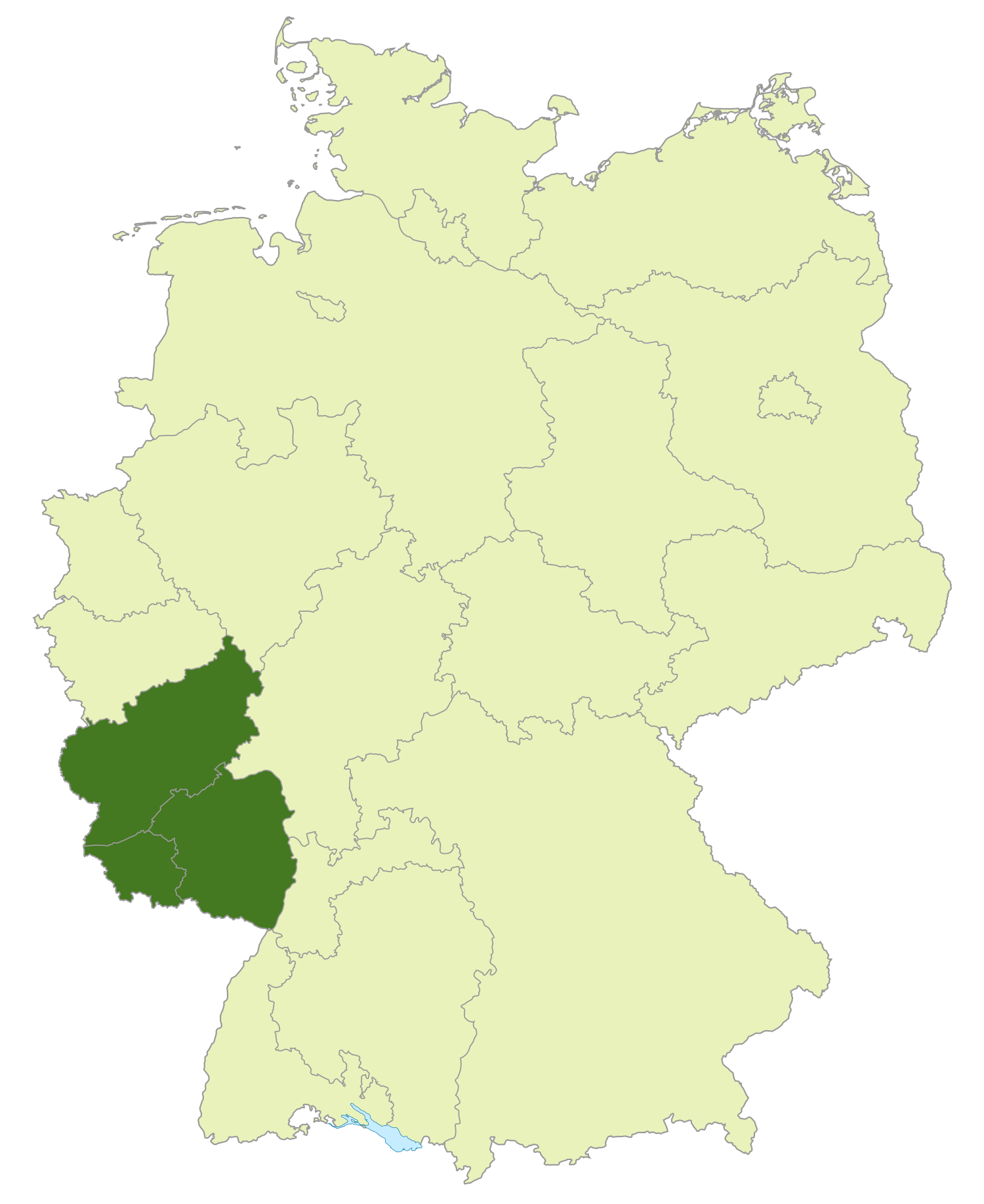
- Organising body: Southwestern Regional Football Association
- Founded: 1978; 48 years ago
- Country: Germany
- States: Rhineland-Palatinate; Saarland
- Number of clubs: 18
- Level on pyramid: Level 5
- Promotion to: Regionalliga Südwest
- Relegation to: Saarlandliga; Rheinlandliga; Verbandsliga Südwest
- Domestic cups: Rhineland Cup; Saarland Cup; Southwestern Cup
- Current champions: TSV Schott Mainz (2024–25)
- Current: 2026–27 Oberliga Rheinland-Pfalz/Saar

The Oberliga Rheinland-Pfalz/Saar, formerly the Oberliga Südwest, is the highest regional football league for the Rhineland-Palatinate and Saarland states of Germany, organized by the Southwestern Regional Football Association. It is one of twelve Oberligas in German football, the fifth tier of the German football league system. Until the introduction of the 3. Liga in 2008 it was the fourth tier of the league system. Before the introduction of the Regionalligas in 1994, it was the third tier.

From January 1946 up until the creation of the Bundesliga in 1963, the Oberliga Südwest was one of the five highest divisions in Germany. The current league originates from 1978.

== History ==
The Oberliga Rheinland-Pfalz/Saar is one of fourteen Oberligas in Germany. The league is a combination of the regional Rhineland, Saarland and Southwest Football Associations, the next league up is Regionalliga Südwest. It was formed in 1978 out of the top teams of the Amateurligas Rheinland, Saarland and Südwest. Until 2008, when the 3. Liga was introduced, the Oberliga was the fourth tier of the league system.

From 2012 onwards, the league became a feeder league to the new Regionalliga Südwest, together with the Hessenliga and the Oberliga Baden-Württemberg. The previous league the Oberliga Südwest was set below at, the Regionalliga West, from then on only accommodate clubs from Northrhine-Westphalia.

At the end of the 2011–12 season the league was also renamed from Oberliga Südwest to Oberliga Rheinland-Pfalz/Saar, with Oddset being the official name sponsor of the league.

=== Rules ===
Nominally 18 teams compete for the Oberliga Rheinland-Pfalz/Saar title. Teams play each other twice, once at home and once away. At the end of the season the champion used to be promoted into either the Regionalliga Süd or the Regionalliga Nord, later the Regionalliga West, depending on their geographical location. From 2008, the league winner was promoted to the Regionalliga West. In the 2007–08 season, the teams finishing from 2nd to 4th were also promoted.

If the team that wins the league or is on a promotion spot at the end of the season fails to have the correct license then the team who finishes next would be promoted instead of them.

Teams promoted to the new Regionalliga in 2008:

- 1. FSV Mainz 05 II
- 1. FC Kaiserslautern II
- Wormatia Worms
- Eintracht Trier

== Promotion ==
The winner of the Oberliga Südwest was originally directly promoted to the 2nd Bundesliga Süd. After introduction of the unified 2nd Bundesliga in 1981, the champion had to take part in a promotion play-off. With the introduction of the Regionalliga in 1994 the league winners were again directly promoted. However, this league was demoted to fourth tier of German football after 2008.

== Relegation ==
The bottom three clubs of the Oberliga will be relegated to the Verbandsliga of their football association (Verband). These are:

- Verbandsliga Südwest
- Saarlandliga
- Rheinlandliga

In turn, the Verbandsliga champions will gain entry to the Oberliga. In more recent history the runners-up of the three Verbandsligas were given the opportunity to compete in a promotion round for one more spot in the Oberliga in the following season.

== Previous winners ==
The league champions:

Season	Club
1978–79	Röchling Völklingen
1979–80	Borussia Neunkirchen
1980–81	1. FSV Mainz 05
1981–82	FC Homburg
1982–83	1. FC Saarbrücken
1983–84	FC Homburg
1984–85	FSV Salmrohr
1985–86	Wormatia Worms
1986–87	Eintracht Trier
1987–88	1. FSV Mainz 05
1988–89	SV Edenkoben
1989–90	1. FSV Mainz 05
1990–91	Borussia Neunkirchen
1991–92	FSV Salmrohr
1992–93	Eintracht Trier
1993–94	Eintracht Trier
1994–95	1. FC Kaiserslautern II
1995–96	SV Elversberg
1996–97	1. FC Kaiserslautern II
1997–98	SV Elversberg
1998–99	FK Pirmasens
1999–2000	Borussia Neunkirchen
2000–01	1. FC Kaiserslautern II

Season	Club
2001–02	Borussia Neunkirchen
2002–03	1. FSV Mainz 05 II
2003–04	TuS Koblenz
2004–05	Borussia Neunkirchen
2005–06	FK Pirmasens
2006–07	FSV Oggersheim
2007–08	1. FSV Mainz 05 II
2008–09	1. FC Saarbrücken
2009–10	FC 08 Homburg
2010–11	SC Idar-Oberstein
2011–12	FC 08 Homburg
2012–13	SVN Zweibrücken
2013–14	FK Pirmasens
2014–15	Saar 05 Saarbrücken
2015–16	TuS Koblenz
2016–17	TSV Schott Mainz
2017–18	FC 08 Homburg
2018–19	TuS Rot-Weiß Koblenz
2019–20	TSV Schott Mainz
2020–21	None; season curtailed
2021–22	Wormatia Worms
2022–23	TSV Schott Mainz
2023–24	Eintracht Trier
2024–25	TSV Schott Mainz

Source: "Oberliga SW". Das deutsche Fussball-Archiv.

== League placings ==
The complete list of clubs and placings in the league while operating as the tier five Oberliga Rheinland-Pfalz/Saar and feeding the Regionalliga Südwest (2012–present):

Club	13	14	15	16	17	18	19	20	22	23	24	25
FC 08 Homburg	R	R	R	R	R	1	R	R	R	R	R	R
SV Eintracht Trier 05	R	R	R	R	R	4	6	5	2	R	1	R
TSV Schott Mainz			6	13	1	R	7	1	R	1	R	1
1. FC Kaiserslautern II	R	R	R	R	R	3	9	2	14	7	4	2
FK Pirmasens	8	1	R	R	R	2	R	R	R	3	3	3
TuS Koblenz	1	R	R	1	R	R	4	4	12	2	R	4
Wormatia Worms	R	R	R	R	R	R	R	7	1	R	5	5
SV Gonsenheim	14	9	4	11	9	15		8	7	4	2	6
FV Engers 07						13	5	11	6	5	10	7
TuS/FC Rot-Weiß Koblenz					5	7	1	R	R	R	6	8
Arminia Ludwigshafen	6	4	11	12	16		13	14	3	11	11	9
FC Karbach				3	6	10	12	15	10	9	12	10
FV Diefflen			16		10	5	14	9	9	8	9	11
SC Idar-Oberstein	R	6	14			11	17					12
Eisbachtaler Sportfreunde								18	15	20		13
FV Eppelborn						19			20			14
SV Auersmacher										10	7	15
TuS Mechtersheim	7	13	15		4	9	8	16	11	6	13	16
SV Viktoria Herxheim												17
SV Morlautern					12	16				14	8	18
FC Cosmos Koblenz											14	
SV Alemannia Waldalgesheim		17							8	15	15	
FV Dudenhofen						14		6	5	13	16	
VfR Baumholder											17	
Spvgg Quierscheid											18	
TSG Pfeddersheim	11	7	3	6	11	12	3	10	13	12	19	
FC Bitburg											20	
FC Hertha Wiesbach		8	10	5	3	8	10	13	4	16		
FSV Jägersburg				8	14	6	15		18	17		
Ahrweiler BC										18		
TuS Kirchberg										19		
SG 2000 Mülheim-Karlich									17	21		
SV Elversberg II	15	5	9	16				3	16	22		
FSV Salmrohr	2	2	7	9	15	17			19			
BFV Hassia Bingen							11	17	21			
TSV Emmelshausen							16		22			
FC Speyer 09									23			
SV Röchling Völklingen	10	14	5	7	2	R	2	12	24			
VfB Dillingen							18					
SV Saar 05 Saarbrücken			1	R	7	18						
FK Pirmasens II				15	8							
SC Hauenstein	3	3	2	2	13							
Borussia Neunkirchen	5	15	12	4	17							
SpVgg Burgbrohl		10	13	14	18							
SpVgg EGC Wirges	16		8	10								
SV Mehring	13	16		17								
SVN Zweibrücken	1	R	R	18								
1. FC Saarbrücken II	4	11	17									
SG Betzdorf	9	12	18									
SV Roßbach/Verscheid	12	18										
SC Halberg-Brebach	17											
Sportfreunde Köllerbach	18											

Northern club	21
SV Eintracht Trier 05	1
1. FC Kaiserslautern II	2
BFV Hassia Bingen	3
Alemannia Waldalgesheim	4
TuS Koblenz	5
SV Gonsenheim	6
FV Engers 07	7
SG 2000 Mülheim-Karlich	8
FC Karbach	9
FSV Salmrohr	10
Eisbachtaler Spfr.	11
TSV Emmelshausen	12

Southern club	21
Wormatia Worms	1
FV Dudenhofen	2
FV Diefflen	3
Arminia Ludwigshafen	4
FSV Jägersburg	5
SV Elversberg II	6
SV Röchling Völklingen	7
TSG Pfeddersheim	8
FC Hertha Wiesbach	9
FC Speyer 09	10
TuS Mechtersheim	11
FV Eppelborn	12

=== Key ===
Symbol	Key
B	Bundesliga (1963–present)
2B	2. Bundesliga (1974–present)
3L	3. Liga (2008–present)
R	Regionalliga West/Südwest (1994–2000); Regionalliga Süd (2000–2008); Regionalliga West (2008–2012); Regionalliga Südwest (2012–present)
1	League champions
Place	League
Blank	Played at a league level below this league
