= 1962–63 2. Oberliga =

2. Oberliga
- Season: 1962–63
- Champions: VfB Bottrop Phönix Ludwigshafen FSV Frankfurt
- Relegated: 27 clubs

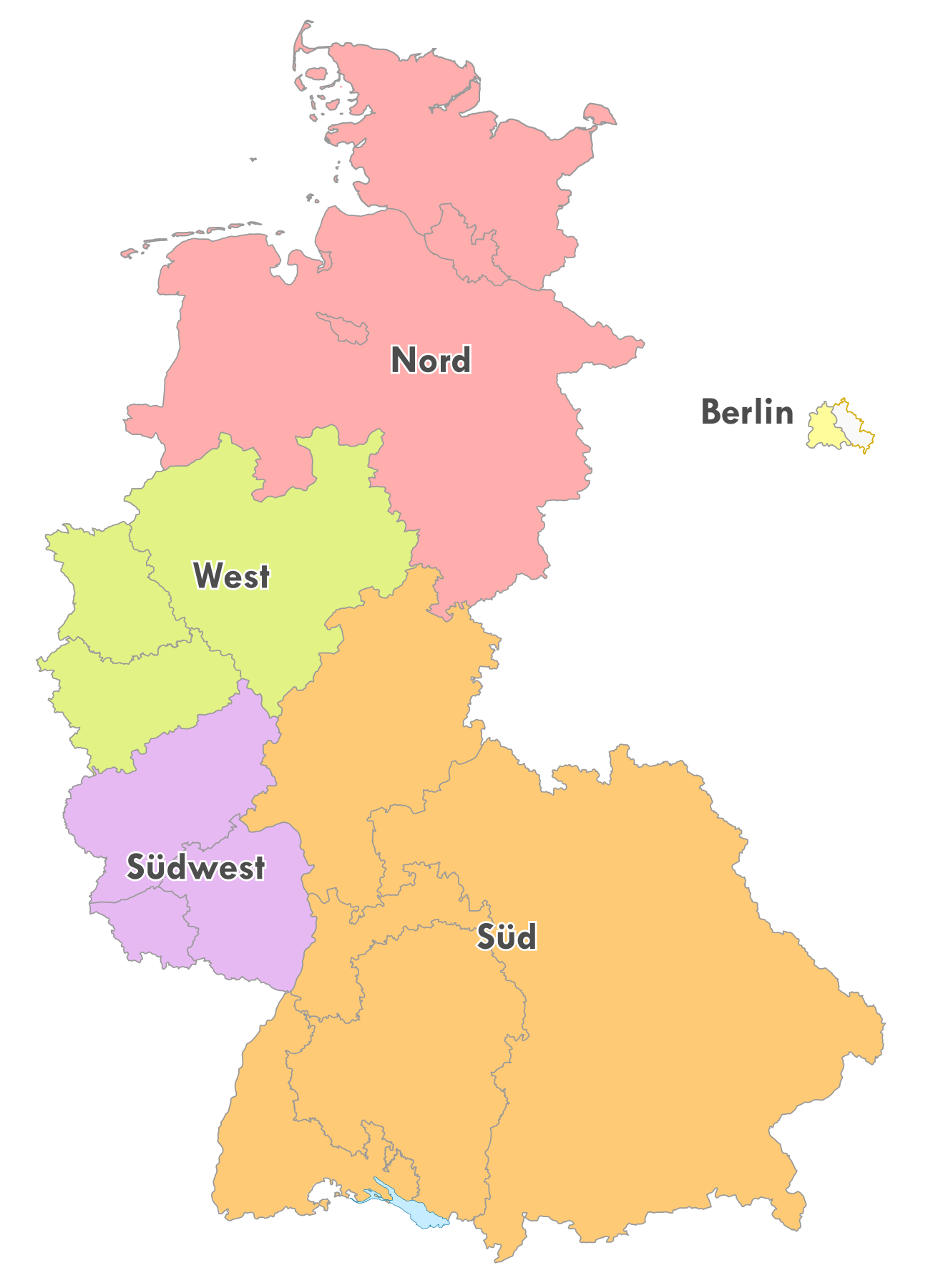
Map of the five German Oberligas 1945 to 1963. 2. Oberligas existed only in the South, Southwest and West.

The 1962–63 2. Oberliga was the fourteenth 2. Oberliga season, the second tier of the football league system in West Germany. The league operated in three regional divisions, South, Southwest and West. In Northern Germany and West Berlin the 2. Oberliga did not exist, local Amateurligas taking their place instead as the second tier of the league system.

It was the last season of the 2. Oberliga as, following the 1962–63 season, the Bundesliga was introduced which the best Oberliga teams qualified for while the best 2. Oberliga teams went to the new Regionalligas, the new second tier of the league system. Those teams not qualified for the Regionalligas dropped to the third tier, the Amateurligas. The new Regionalligas covered the same regions as the previous 2. Oberligas, the Regionalliga Süd taking over from the 2. Oberliga Süd, the Regionalliga Südwest from the 2. Oberliga Südwest and the Regionalliga West from the 2. Oberliga West. In the two regions without 2. Oberligas Regionalligas were also formed, the Regionalliga Nord and Regionalliga Berlin.

== 2. Oberliga West ==
The 1962–63 season saw four new clubs in the league, Arminia Bielefeld and FV Duisburg 08, both promoted from the Amateurliga while Duisburger SV and SV Sodingen had been relegated from the Oberliga West.

Pos	Team	Pld	W	D	L	GF	GA	GD	Pts	Qualification or relegation
1	VfB Bottrop (C, Q)	30	16	5	9	49	34	+15	37	Qualification for Regionalliga West
2	Duisburg 48/99 (Q)	30	13	11	6	40	37	+3	37	Qualification for Regionalliga West
3	SpVgg Herten (Q)	30	15	5	10	50	39	+11	35	Qualification for Regionalliga West
4	STV Horst-Emscher (Q)	30	12	10	8	52	43	+9	34	Qualification for Regionalliga West
5	Sportfreunde Siegen (Q)	30	15	3	12	63	57	+6	33	Qualification for Regionalliga West
6	Rot-Weiß Essen (Q)	30	14	4	12	55	45	+10	32	Qualification for Regionalliga West
7	Arminia Bielefeld (Q)	30	14	4	12	51	51	0	32	Qualification for Regionalliga West
8	Duisburger SV (Q)	30	13	6	11	50	49	+1	32	Qualification for Regionalliga West
9	SV Sodingen (R)	30	11	9	10	47	33	+14	31	Relegation to Amateurliga
10	Eintracht Gelsenkirchen (R)	30	11	8	11	47	41	+6	30	Relegation to Amateurliga
11	Sportfreunde Gladbeck (R)	30	13	4	13	52	50	+2	30	Relegation to Amateurliga
12	SC Dortmund 95 (R)	30	11	7	12	59	59	0	29	Relegation to Amateurliga
13	SV Neukirchen (R)	30	12	5	13	45	47	−2	29	Relegation to Amateurliga
14	VfL Bochum (R)	30	12	3	15	54	53	+1	27	Relegation to Amateurliga
15	FV Duisburg 08 (R)	30	7	9	14	34	45	−11	23	Relegation to Amateurliga
16	Bonner FV (R)	30	2	5	23	26	98	−72	9	Relegation to Amateurliga

Source: f-archiv.de, Liga-Chronik, p: G 37
Rules for classification: 1) Points;
(C) Champions; (Q) Qualified for the phase indicated; (R) Relegated

== 2. Oberliga Südwest ==
The 1962–63 season saw four new clubs in the league, Phönix Bellheim and VfB Wissen, both promoted from the Amateurliga while Phönix Ludwigshafen and Eintracht Trier had been relegated from the Oberliga Südwest.

Pos	Team	Pld	W	D	L	GF	GA	GD	Pts	Qualification or relegation
1	Phönix Ludwigshafen (C, Q)	28	21	5	2	78	25	+53	47	Qualification for Regionalliga Südwest
2	Eintracht Trier (Q)	30	18	5	7	75	41	+34	41	Qualification for Regionalliga Südwest
3	SpVgg Weisenau (Q)	30	17	7	6	72	53	+19	41	Qualification for Regionalliga Südwest
4	Phönix Bellheim (Note: The clubs placed fourth to eighth played a qualification round with the 15th and 16th-placed Oberliga team and the southwestern Amateur champions, ASV Landau, for four more spots in the new Regionalliga.) (Q)	30	16	4	10	69	58	+11	36	Qualification for Regionalliga Südwest promotion round
5	Röchling Völklingen (Q)	30	15	6	9	46	44	+2	36	Qualification for Regionalliga Südwest promotion round
6	VfB Wissen (R)	30	13	8	9	69	60	+9	34	Qualification for Regionalliga Südwest promotion round
7	Hassia Bingen (R)	30	13	6	11	62	61	+1	32	Qualification for Regionalliga Südwest promotion round
8	TSC Zweibrücken (Q)	30	13	5	12	49	47	+2	31	Qualification for Regionalliga Südwest promotion round
9	FSV Schifferstadt (R)	31	11	8	12	53	62	−9	30	Relegation to Amateurliga
10	Germania Metternich (R)	30	12	4	14	61	56	+5	28	Relegation to Amateurliga
11	VfB Theley (R)	30	8	8	14	45	67	−22	24	Relegation to Amateurliga
12	SV Ludweiler/Warndt (R)	30	8	6	16	44	53	−9	22	Relegation to Amateurliga
13	SV St. Ingbert (R)	30	9	4	17	34	55	−21	22	Relegation to Amateurliga
14	FV Engers (R)	30	8	5	17	40	58	−18	21	Relegation to Amateurliga
15	SC Friedrichsthal (R)	30	6	6	18	39	64	−25	18	Relegation to Amateurliga
16	FV Speyer (R)	30	7	4	19	32	64	−32	18	Relegation to Amateurliga

Source: f-archiv.de, Liga-Chronik, p: H 36
Rules for classification: 1) Points;
(C) Champions; (Q) Qualified for the phase indicated; (R) Relegated

== 2. Oberliga Süd ==
The 1962–63 season saw five new clubs in the league, ESV Ingolstadt, SV Darmstadt 98 and VfR Heilbronn, all three promoted from the Amateurliga while FSV Frankfurt and SV Waldhof Mannheim had been relegated from the Oberliga Süd.

Pos	Team	Pld	W	D	L	GF	GA	GD	Pts	Qualification or relegation
1	FSV Frankfurt (C, Q)	34	19	7	8	63	46	+17	45	Qualification for Regionalliga Süd
2	ESV Ingolstadt (Q)	34	15	11	8	70	42	+28	41	Qualification for Regionalliga Süd
3	SV Waldhof Mannheim (Q)	34	18	5	11	67	46	+21	41	Qualification for Regionalliga Süd
4	1. FC Pforzheim (Q)	34	17	6	11	70	47	+23	40	Qualification for Regionalliga Süd
5	Freiburger FC (Q)	34	15	9	10	68	38	+30	39	Qualification for Regionalliga Süd
6	Stuttgarter Kickers (Q)	34	17	4	13	61	47	+14	38	Qualification for Regionalliga Süd
7	Amicitia Viernheim (Q)	34	16	6	12	70	56	+14	38	Qualification for Regionalliga Süd
8	SpVgg Neu-Isenburg (Q)	34	16	4	14	73	73	0	36	Qualification for Regionalliga Süd
9	Borussia Fulda (Q)	34	15	6	13	53	54	−1	36	Qualification for Regionalliga Süd
10	SV Darmstadt 98 (R)	34	15	5	14	46	50	−4	35	Relegation to Amateurliga
11	VfB Helmbrechts (R)	34	15	4	15	58	64	−6	34	Relegation to Amateurliga
12	VfL Neustadt (R)	34	11	8	15	51	56	−5	30	Relegation to Amateurliga
13	Jahn Regensburg (R)	34	10	10	14	44	72	−28	30	Relegation to Amateurliga
14	1. FC Haßfurt (R)	34	12	5	17	70	86	−16	29	Relegation to Amateurliga
15	Viktoria Aschaffenburg (R)	34	11	6	17	62	62	0	28	Relegation to Amateurliga
16	FC Singen 04 (R)	34	9	10	15	41	62	−21	28	Relegation to Amateurliga
17	FC Hanau 93 (R)	34	6	11	17	51	79	−28	23	Relegation to Amateurliga
18	VfR Heilbronn (R)	34	8	5	21	49	87	−38	21	Relegation to Amateurliga

Source: f-archiv.de, Liga-Chronik, p: I 38
Rules for classification: 1) Points;
(C) Champions; (Q) Qualified for the phase indicated; (R) Relegated

== Other tier two leagues ==
The leagues and league champions of the regions without a 2. Oberliga at the second tier of the league system in 1962–63:

- Amateurliga Berlin — Blau-Weiß 90 Berlin
- Amateurliga Bremen — AGSV Bremen
- Amateurliga Hamburg — HSV Barmbek-Uhlenhorst
- Amateuroberliga Niedersachsen West — VfL Oldenburg
- Amateuroberliga Niedersachsen Ost — VfL Wolfsburg
- Amateurliga Schleswig-Holstein — Heider SV
