= 1972–73 Regionalliga =

Regionalliga
- Season: 1972–73
- Champions: FC St.Pauli Blau-Weiß 90 Berlin Rot-Weiß Essen FSV Mainz 05 SV Darmstadt 98
- Promoted: Rot-Weiß Essen Fortuna Köln
- Relegated: TuS Celle SC Leu Braunschweig Tasmania 1900 Berlin Rot-Weiß Neukölln Bayer Leverkusen Lüner SV Eintracht Trier Phönix Bellheim SpVgg 07 Ludwigsburg SSV Reutlingen 05 FC Wacker München

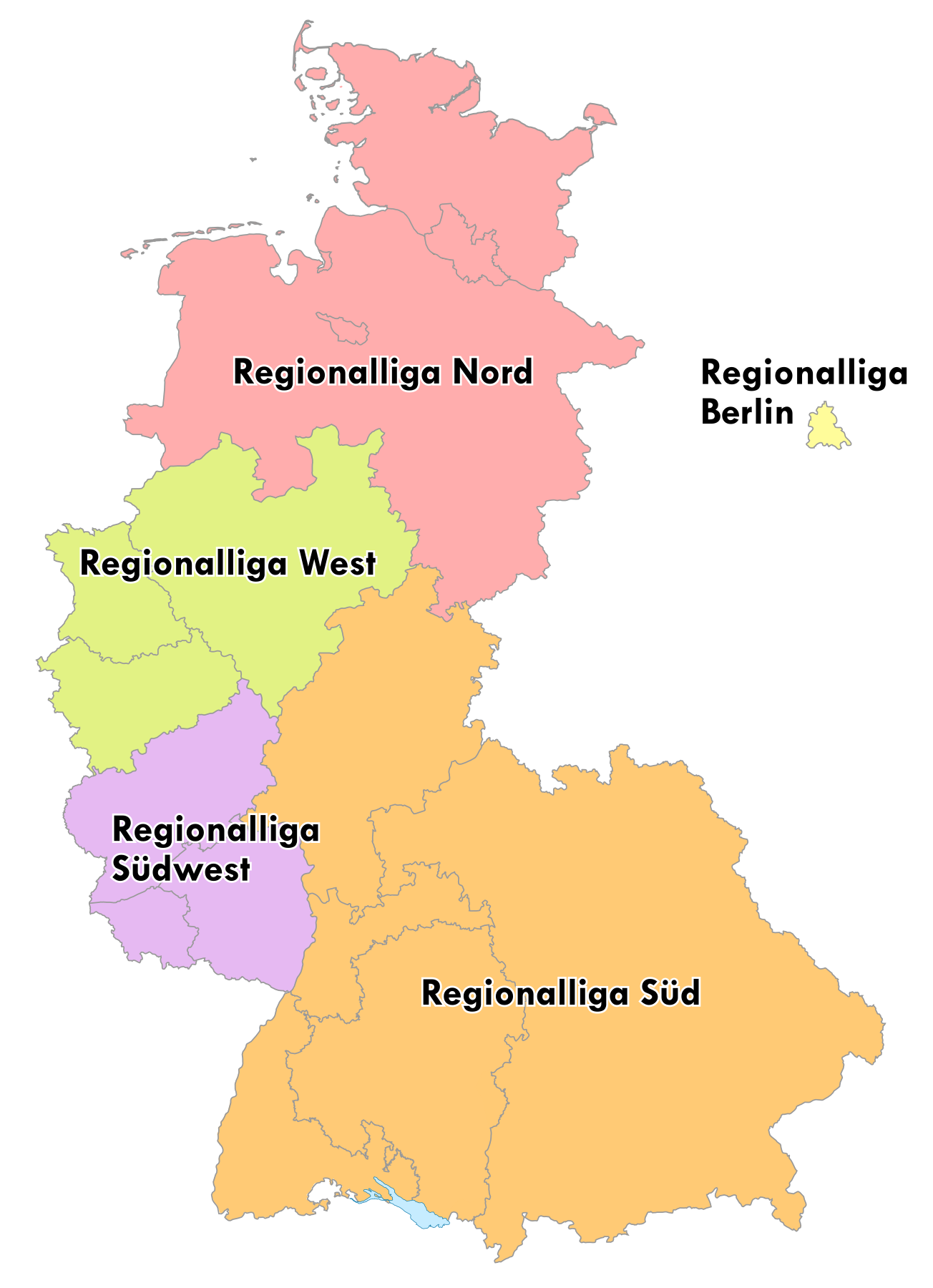
Map of the five German Regionalligas from 1963 to 1974

The 1972–73 Regionalliga was the tenth season of the Regionalliga, the second tier of the German football league system. The league operated in five regional divisions, Berlin, North, South, Southwest and West. The five league champions and all five runners-up, at the end of the season, entered a promotion play-off to determine the two clubs to move up to the Bundesliga for the next season. Both promotion spots went to the Regionalliga West with Rot-Weiß Essen and Fortuna Köln promoted.

== Regionalliga Nord ==
The 1972–73 season saw two new clubs in the league, VfB Oldenburg and SV Meppen, both promoted from the Amateurliga, while no club had been relegated from the Bundesliga to the league.

Pos	Team	Pld	W	D	L	GF	GA	GD	Pts	Promotion, qualification or relegation
1	FC St.Pauli	34	26	4	4	94	33	+61	56	Qualification to promotion playoffs
2	VfL Osnabrück	34	24	3	7	75	41	+34	51	Qualification to promotion playoffs
3	VfL Wolfsburg	34	19	8	7	71	35	+36	46	
4	Göttingen 05	34	18	7	9	60	36	+24	43	
5	HSV Barmbek-Uhlenhorst	34	12	16	6	47	35	+12	40	
6	VfB Lübeck	34	15	10	9	48	42	+6	40	
7	Holstein Kiel	34	12	13	9	63	47	+16	37	
8	Phönix Lübeck	34	15	7	12	55	58	−3	37	
9	Arminia Hannover	34	11	12	11	48	41	+7	34	
10	SV Meppen	34	9	12	13	51	62	−11	30	
11	VfB Oldenburg	34	12	4	18	54	73	−19	28	
12	Olympia Wilhelmshaven	34	8	11	15	47	55	−8	27	
13	Heider SV	34	8	9	17	44	54	−10	25	
14	TuS Bremerhaven 93	34	6	13	15	40	60	−20	25	
15	OSV Hannover	34	10	5	19	51	74	−23	25	
16	Itzehoer SV	34	8	9	17	27	58	−31	25	
17	TuS Celle (R)	34	6	10	18	40	70	−30	22	Relegation to Amateurliga
18	SC Leu Braunschweig (R)	34	6	9	19	37	78	−41	21	Relegation to Amateurliga

Source: Fussballdaten.de (in German)
Rules for classification: 1) Points;
(R) Relegated

== Regionalliga Berlin ==
The 1972–73 season saw two new clubs in the league, BFC Preussen and Rot-Weiß Neukölln, both promoted from the Amateurliga Berlin, while no club had been relegated from the Bundesliga to the league. The league played a home-and-away round, after which it was split into a championship and relegation round. Former Bundesliga club Tasmania 1900 Berlin became insolvent at the end of the 1972–73 season and folded.

Pos	Team	Pld	W	D	L	GF	GA	GD	Pts	Promotion, qualification or relegation
1	Blau-Weiß 90 Berlin	32	21	6	5	78	32	+46	48	Qualification to promotion playoffs
2	Wacker 04 Berlin	32	23	1	8	87	42	+45	47	Qualification to promotion playoffs
3	Tennis Borussia Berlin	32	18	7	7	73	29	+44	43	
4	Tasmania 1900 Berlin	32	18	7	7	62	39	+23	43	Club folded
5	Hertha Zehlendorf	32	13	5	14	78	79	−1	31	
6	Berliner SV 92	32	10	6	16	39	52	−13	26	
7	Spandauer SV	32	13	4	15	53	55	−2	30	
8	Rapide Wedding	32	12	4	16	43	55	−12	28	
9	BFC Preußen Berlin	32	11	4	17	48	58	−10	26	
10	1. FC Neukölln	32	10	4	18	42	74	−32	24	
11	Alemannia 90 Berlin	32	7	7	18	30	70	−40	21	
12	Rot-Weiß Neukölln (R)	32	6	5	21	27	75	−48	17	Relegation to Amateurliga

Source: Weltfussball.de (in German)
Rules for classification: 1) Points;
(R) Relegated

== Regionalliga West ==
The 1972–73 season saw four new clubs in the league, 1. FC Mülheim and Sportfreunde Siegen, both promoted from the Verbandsliga, while Arminia Bielefeld, as part of the Bundesliga scandal, and Borussia Dortmund had been relegated from the Bundesliga to the league. Eintracht Gelsenkirchen merged at the end of the 1972–73 season with STV Horst-Emscher to form Eintracht Gelsenkirchen-Horst.

Pos	Team	Pld	W	D	L	GF	GA	GD	Pts	Promotion, qualification or relegation
1	Rot-Weiß Essen (P)	34	26	3	5	104	40	+64	55	Qualification to promotion playoffs
2	Fortuna Köln (P)	34	21	8	5	85	29	+56	50	Qualification to promotion playoffs
3	Bayer Uerdingen	34	16	11	7	73	50	+23	43	
4	Borussia Dortmund	34	16	9	9	77	45	+32	41	
5	Wattenscheid 09	34	16	8	10	70	60	+10	40	
6	Alemannia Aachen	34	15	9	10	66	50	+16	39	
7	Sportfreunde Siegen	34	14	11	9	55	53	+2	39	
8	1. FC Mülheim	34	13	12	9	46	56	−10	38	
9	DJK Gütersloh	34	14	9	11	51	56	−5	37	
10	SpVgg Erkenschwick	34	16	4	14	73	60	+13	36	
11	Arminia Bielefeld	34	9	12	13	46	66	−20	30	
12	Schwarz-Weiß Essen	34	11	7	16	41	58	−17	29	
13	Preußen Münster	34	11	7	16	47	66	−19	29	
14	Eintracht Gelsenkirchen	34	10	6	18	44	65	−21	26	
15	Westfalia Herne	34	7	10	17	34	52	−18	24	
16	Arminia Gütersloh	34	7	10	17	44	68	−24	24	
17	Bayer Leverkusen (R)	34	6	7	21	38	76	−38	19	Relegation to Verbandsliga
18	Lüner SV (R)	34	1	11	22	43	87	−44	13	Relegation to Verbandsliga

Source: Fussballdaten.de (in German)
Rules for classification: 1) Points;
(P) Promoted; (R) Relegated

== Regionalliga Südwest ==
The 1972–73 season saw two new clubs in the league, VfB Theley and Sportfreunde Eisbachtal, both promoted from the Amateurliga, while no club had been relegated from the Bundesliga to the league.

Pos	Team	Pld	W	D	L	GF	GA	GD	Pts	Promotion, qualification or relegation
1	FSV Mainz 05	30	18	8	4	80	41	+39	44	Qualification to promotion playoffs
2	Röchling Völklingen	30	17	10	3	53	19	+34	44	Qualification to promotion playoffs
3	FK Pirmasens	30	17	7	6	73	40	+33	41	
4	Wormatia Worms	30	14	11	5	70	39	+31	39	
5	Borussia Neunkirchen	30	16	6	8	59	35	+24	38	
6	ASV Landau	30	14	7	9	51	32	+19	35	
7	FC Homburg	30	14	6	10	72	52	+20	34	
8	SV Alsenborn	30	11	9	10	52	47	+5	31	
9	Südwest Ludwigshafen	30	8	14	8	37	37	0	30	
10	VfB Theley	30	9	9	12	39	53	−14	27	
11	TuS Neuendorf	30	7	12	11	37	50	−13	26	
12	FV Speyer	30	9	7	14	34	46	−12	25	
13	1.FC Saarbrücken	30	7	10	13	37	49	−12	24	
14	Sportfreunde Eisbachtal	30	5	10	15	43	83	−40	20	
15	Eintracht Trier (R)	30	5	2	23	34	83	−49	12	Relegation to Amateurliga
16	Phönix Bellheim (R)	30	2	6	22	35	100	−65	10	Relegation to Amateurliga

Source: Fussballdaten.de (in German)
Rules for classification: 1) Points;
(R) Relegated

== Regionalliga Süd ==
The 1972–73 season saw three new clubs in the league, SV Waldhof Mannheim, VfR Oli Bürstadt and FC Wacker München, all three promoted from the Amateurliga, while no club had been relegated from the Bundesliga to the league.

Pos	Team	Pld	W	D	L	GF	GA	GD	Pts	Promotion, qualification or relegation
1	SV Darmstadt 98	34	20	6	8	72	37	+35	46	Qualification to promotion playoffs
2	Karlsruher SC	34	19	7	8	72	48	+24	45	Qualification to promotion playoffs
3	TSV 1860 München	34	17	8	9	79	50	+29	42	
4	SpVgg Bayreuth	34	19	4	11	51	38	+13	42	
5	1. FC Nürnberg	34	17	7	10	61	52	+9	41	
6	VfR Heilbronn	34	18	4	12	64	48	+16	40	
7	SV Waldhof Mannheim	34	16	7	11	60	44	+16	39	
8	Stuttgarter Kickers	34	15	5	14	60	51	+9	35	
9	SpVgg Fürth	34	14	7	13	48	50	−2	35	
10	KSV Hessen Kassel	34	13	7	14	59	58	+1	33	
11	SSV Jahn Regensburg	34	14	5	15	53	53	0	33	
12	FC Bayern Hof	34	12	7	15	67	60	+7	31	
13	VfR Oli Bürstadt	34	12	7	15	54	62	−8	31	
14	1. FC Schweinfurt 05	34	11	9	14	54	72	−18	31	
15	Freiburger FC	34	11	7	16	48	73	−25	29	
16	SpVgg 07 Ludwigsburg (R)	34	10	8	16	53	62	−9	28	Relegation to Amateurliga
17	SSV Reutlingen 05 (R)	34	7	6	21	41	84	−43	20	Relegation to Amateurliga
18	FC Wacker München (R)	34	4	3	27	37	91	−54	11	Relegation to Amateurliga

Source: Weltfussball.de (in German)
Rules for classification: 1) Points;
(R) Relegated

== Bundesliga promotion round ==
=== Group 1 ===
Pos	Team	Pld	W	D	L	GF	GA	GD	Pts	Promotion, qualification or relegation
1	Fortuna Köln (P)	8	6	1	1	25	5	+20	13	Promotion to Bundesliga
2	FC St.Pauli	8	4	2	2	23	18	+5	10	
3	FSV Mainz 05	8	3	3	2	17	11	+6	9	
4	Karlsruher SC	8	2	2	4	17	23	−6	6	
5	Blau-Weiß 90 Berlin	8	1	0	7	10	35	−25	2	

Source: Fussballdaten.de (in German)
Rules for classification: 1) Points;
(P) Promoted

=== Group 2 ===
Pos	Team	Pld	W	D	L	GF	GA	GD	Pts	Promotion, qualification or relegation
1	Rot-Weiß Essen (P)	8	6	2	0	23	8	+15	14	Promotion to Bundesliga
2	Darmstadt 98	8	2	4	2	18	14	+4	8	
3	Röchling Völklingen	8	3	1	4	10	17	−7	7	
4	VfL Osnabrück	8	3	0	5	12	17	−5	6	
5	Wacker 04 Berlin	8	1	3	4	9	16	−7	5	

Source: Fussballdaten.de (in German)
Rules for classification: 1) Points;
(P) Promoted
