= Amateurliga Südwest =

- Founded: 1952; 73 years ago
- Folded: 1978; 47 years ago
- Replaced by: Oberliga Südwest (III); Verbandsliga Südwest (IV)
- Country: Germany
- State: Rheinland-Pfalz
- Level on pyramid: Level 3
- Promotion to: 2. Oberliga Südwest (1952–63); Regionalliga Südwest (1963–74); 2. Bundesliga Süd (1974–78)
- Domestic cup(s): South West Cup
- Last champions: FSV Mainz 05 (1977–78)

The Amateurliga Südwest was the highest football league in the region of the Südwest FA and the third tier of the German football league system from its inception in 1952 to the formation of the Oberliga Südwest and the Verbandsliga Südwest below it in 1978.

== Overview ==
The Amateurliga Südwest was formed in 1952 in the southern half of the state of Rheinland-Pfalz. Before its inception, three separate leagues operated in the area as the highest level of play. The league was a feeder league to the 2. Oberliga Südwest. From 1952 until the establishment of the Oberliga Südwest in 1978, it was the third tier of the football league system.

The winner of the Amateurliga Südwest was not automatically promoted to its superior league but rather had to take part in a promotion play-off. The champion would have to compete with the winners of the Amateurligas Saarland and Rheinland.

Until 1933, the region covered by the Südwest FA was politically part of two other German states. The south, the Pfalz region, was part of Bavaria and the north, the Rheinhessen region, was part of Hessen. After the war, these regions were incorporated into the new state of Rheinland-Pfalz. The separation of these areas from their original states results from the outcome of World War II when they became part of the French occupation zone, while Hessen and Bavaria where in the US zone.

The league was established in 1952 with sixteen teams, the winner gaining promotion to the 2. Oberliga Südwest. The founder members were:

- BSC Oppau
- VfR Friesenheim
- FSV Schifferstadt
- Phönix Bellheim
- SV Alsenborn
- TuS Hochspeyer
- SpVgg Idar
- Palatia Böhl
- SC Oberstein 08
- SC West-Kaiserslautern
- SpVgg Ingelheim
- SV Gonsenheim
- Fontania Finthen
- FC Sobernheim
- SG Waldfischbach
- SV Mundenheim

With the introduction of the Bundesliga in 1963 the Amateurliga was placed below the new Regionalliga Südwest but still retained its third-tier status. It continued to do so after the introduction of the 2. Bundesliga Süd in 1974.

The 1. FC Kaiserslautern II holds the record for years in the league, having spent 21 continuous seasons in it from 1957 to 1978.

There is room for some confusion with the existence of the Oberliga Südwest as well as the Verbandsliga Südwest and the now defunct leagues Regionalliga Südwest and Amateurliga Südwest. While the Oberliga and Regionalliga of that name cover and covered the whole states of Rheinland-Pfalz and Saarland, the Verbandsliga and Amateurliga only covered the southern part of Rheinland-Pfalz and operated as feeders for the first two. The root of the problem lies in the lack of common history in the region and therefore the lack of a common name.

== Disbanding of the Amateurliga Südwest ==
In 1978, the Oberliga Südwest was formed to allow direct promotion to the 2. Bundesliga Süd for the Amateure champion of the area. The teams placed one to five gained entry to the Oberliga while the next eleven teams were put into the new Verbandsliga Südwest, now the fourth tier of the football league system. The bottom four teams were relegated to the Bezirksliga.

Admitted to the new Oberliga:

- FSV Mainz 05
- Hassia Bingen
- Eintracht Kreuznach
- Südwest Ludwigshafen
- 1. FC Kaiserslautern II

Relegated to the new Verbandsliga:

- FK Clausen
- VfR Kirn
- Ludwigshafener SC
- FC Rodalben
- Viktoria Herxheim
- SG Pirmasens
- TuS Landstuhl
- VfR Frankenthal
- Gummi-Mayer Landau
- 1. FC Haßloch
- VfR Baumholder

Relegated to the Bezirksliga:

- ASV Idar-Oberstein
- SV Guntersblum
- SV Worms-Horchheim
- FC Sobernheim

== Winners of the Amateurliga Südwest ==
**Season**	**Club**
1952–53	**BSC Oppau**
1953–54	**SpVgg Weisenau**
1954–55	FC Sobernheim
1955–56	Normannia Pfiffigheim
1956–57	Hassia Bingen
1957–58	**SC Ludwigshafen**
1958–59	**Hassia Bingen**
1959–60	1. FC Kaiserslautern II
1960–61	**FC Sobernheim**
1961–62	**Phönix Bellheim**
1962–63	**ASV Landau**
1963–64	Eintracht Kreuznach
1964–65	**SV Alsenborn**

**Season**	**Club**
1965–66	VfR Kaiserslautern
1966–67	**SC Ludwigshafen**
1967–68	1. FC Kaiserslautern II
1968–69	**ASV Landau**
1969–70	**VfR Frankenthal**
1970–71	**Phönix Bellheim**
1971–72	Eintracht Kreuznach
1972–73	**Eintracht Kreuznach**
1973–74	FK Clausen
1974–75	**Eintracht Kreuznach**
1975–76	VfR Wormatia Worms
1976–77	**VfR Wormatia Worms**
1977–78	FSV Mainz 05

Source:"Verbandsliga Südwest". Das deutsche Fussball–Archiv. Archived from the original on 7 March 2008.

- **Bold** denotes team gained promotion.
- In 1960 the FSV Schifferstadt was promoted as runners–up since Kaiserslautern's reserve team was ineligible for promotion. For the same reason, FV Speyer was promoted in 1968.
