= 1971–72 Regionalliga =

Regionalliga
- Season: 1971–72
- Champions: FC St.Pauli Wacker 04 Berlin Wuppertaler SV Borussia Neunkirchen Kickers Offenbach
- Promoted: Wuppertaler SV Kickers Offenbach
- Relegated: SC Sperber Hamburg Polizei SV Bremen TuS Wannsee Meteor 06 Berlin VfR Neuß Viktoria Köln VfL Klafeld VfR Frankenthal SpVgg Andernach Opel Rüsselsheim FC 08 Villingen ESV Ingolstadt

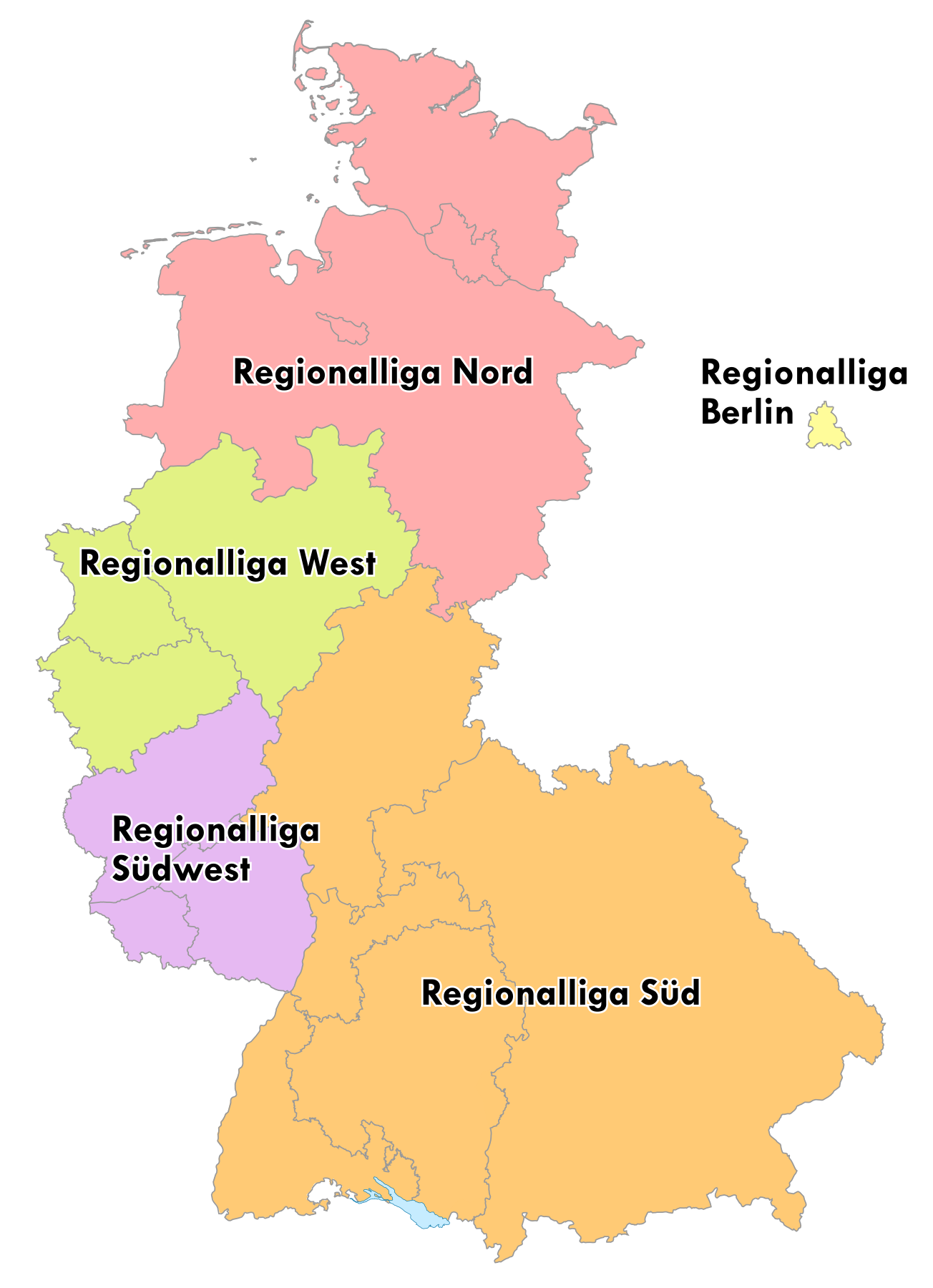
Map of the five German Regionalligas from 1963 to 1974

The 1971–72 Regionalliga was the ninth season of the Regionalliga, the second tier of the German football league system. The league operated in five regional divisions, Berlin, North, South, Southwest and West. The five league champions and all five runners-up, at the end of the season, entered a promotion play-off to determine the two clubs to move up to the Bundesliga for the next season. The two promotion spots went to the Regionalliga West and Regionalliga Süd champions Wuppertaler SV and Kickers Offenbach.

== Regionalliga Nord ==
The 1971–72 season saw two new clubs in the league, OSV Hannover and Polizei SV Bremen, both promoted from the Amateurliga, while no club had been relegated from the Bundesliga to the league.

Pos	Team	Pld	W	D	L	GF	GA	GD	Pts	Promotion, qualification or relegation
1	FC St. Pauli	34	24	6	4	86	37	+49	54	Qualification to promotion playoffs
2	VfL Osnabrück	34	21	7	6	62	20	+42	49	Qualification to promotion playoffs
3	VfL Wolfsburg	34	20	5	9	63	38	+25	45	
4	HSV Barmbek-Uhlenhorst	34	19	7	8	53	33	+20	45	
5	Göttingen 05	34	20	4	10	67	48	+19	44	
6	VfB Lübeck	34	14	11	9	50	41	+9	39	
7	SC Leu Braunschweig	34	13	12	9	60	47	+13	38	
8	Olympia Wilhelmshaven	34	13	7	14	36	33	+3	33	
9	Heider SV	34	11	10	13	50	50	0	32	
10	TuS Celle	34	12	7	15	52	64	−12	31	
11	Holstein Kiel	34	12	6	16	48	56	−8	30	
12	Phönix Lübeck	34	8	14	12	43	59	−16	30	
13	OSV Hannover	34	12	6	16	47	69	−22	30	
14	Arminia Hannover	34	10	8	16	43	51	−8	28	
15	TuS Bremerhaven 93	34	8	9	17	42	60	−18	25	
16	Itzehoer SV	34	8	5	21	36	60	−24	21	
17	SC Sperber Hamburg (R)	34	6	7	21	34	69	−35	19	Relegation to Amateurliga
18	Polizei SV Bremen (R)	34	6	7	21	31	68	−37	19	Relegation to Amateurliga

Source: Fussballdaten.de (in German)
Rules for classification: 1) Points;
(R) Relegated

== Regionalliga Berlin ==
The 1971–72 season saw two new clubs in the league, Berliner SV 1892 and Meteor 06 Berlin, both promoted from the Amateurliga Berlin, while no club had been relegated from the Bundesliga to the league.

Pos	Team	Pld	W	D	L	GF	GA	GD	Pts	Promotion, qualification or relegation
1	Wacker 04 Berlin	33	24	5	4	85	28	+57	53	Qualification to promotion playoffs
2	Tasmania 1900 Berlin	33	24	4	5	83	23	+60	52	Qualification to promotion playoffs
3	Blau-Weiß 90 Berlin	33	22	7	4	102	37	+65	51	
4	Tennis Borussia Berlin	33	22	6	5	82	26	+56	50	
5	Spandauer SV	33	14	6	13	51	60	−9	34	
6	Hertha Zehlendorf	33	10	8	15	56	66	−10	28	
7	1. FC Neukölln	33	11	5	17	45	66	−21	27	
8	Alemannia 90 Berlin	33	9	7	17	37	55	−18	25	
9	Berliner SV 92	33	7	8	18	27	63	−36	22	
10	Rapide Wedding	33	9	4	20	42	83	−41	22	
11	TuS Wannsee (R)	33	7	4	22	27	79	−52	18	Relegation to Amateurliga
12	Meteor 06 Berlin (R)	33	4	6	23	40	91	−51	14	Relegation to Amateurliga

Source: Fussballdaten.de (in German)
Rules for classification: 1) Points;
(R) Relegated

== Regionalliga West ==
The 1971–72 season saw four new clubs in the league, Bayer Uerdingen, VfL Klafeld and Arminia Gütersloh, both promoted from the Verbandsliga, while Rot-Weiß Essen had been relegated from the Bundesliga to the league.

Pos	Team	Pld	W	D	L	GF	GA	GD	Pts	Promotion, qualification or relegation
1	Wuppertaler SV (P)	34	28	4	2	111	23	+88	60	Qualification to promotion playoffs
2	Rot-Weiß Essen	34	24	6	4	113	37	+76	54	Qualification to promotion playoffs
3	Fortuna Köln	34	21	6	7	76	41	+35	48	
4	Alemannia Aachen	34	14	14	6	51	38	+13	42	
5	Schwarz-Weiß Essen	34	15	9	10	57	48	+9	39	
6	SpVgg Erkenschwick	34	13	10	11	41	52	−11	36	
7	Bayer Uerdingen	34	13	9	12	49	51	−2	35	
8	Bayer Leverkusen	34	15	5	14	41	49	−8	35	
9	Arminia Gütersloh	34	12	7	15	48	56	−8	31	
10	Eintracht Gelsenkirchen	34	11	9	14	50	60	−10	31	
11	Preußen Münster	34	12	7	15	43	57	−14	31	
12	Wattenscheid 09	34	9	12	13	43	49	−6	30	
13	DJK Gütersloh	34	12	5	17	44	75	−31	29	
14	Westfalia Herne	34	9	10	15	39	52	−13	28	
15	Lüner SV	34	10	7	17	34	50	−16	27	
16	VfR Neuß (R)	34	8	5	21	42	69	−27	21	Relegation to Verbandsliga
17	Viktoria Köln (R)	34	6	9	19	34	62	−28	21	Relegation to Verbandsliga
18	VfL Klafeld (R)	34	5	4	25	24	71	−47	14	Relegation to Verbandsliga

Source: Fussballdaten.de (in German)
Rules for classification: 1) Points;
(P) Promoted; (R) Relegated

== Regionalliga Südwest ==
The 1971–72 season saw two new clubs in the league, Phönix Bellheim and SpVgg Andernach, both promoted from the Amateurliga, while no club had been relegated from the Bundesliga to the league.

Pos	Team	Pld	W	D	L	GF	GA	GD	Pts	Promotion, qualification or relegation
1	Borussia Neunkirchen	30	19	10	1	77	22	+55	48	Qualification to promotion playoffs
2	Röchling Völklingen	30	18	5	7	55	34	+21	41	Qualification to promotion playoffs
3	SV Alsenborn	30	17	4	9	63	38	+25	38	
4	FSV Mainz 05	30	15	7	8	57	41	+16	37	
5	TuS Neuendorf	30	13	7	10	54	34	+20	33	
6	FK Pirmasens	30	12	8	10	56	49	+7	32	
7	Wormatia Worms	30	13	6	11	63	63	0	32	
8	ASV Landau	30	11	8	11	41	44	−3	30	
9	FC Homburg	30	11	7	12	38	30	+8	29	
10	Südwest Ludwigshafen	30	11	7	12	41	39	+2	29	
11	FV Speyer	30	9	10	11	37	57	−20	28	
12	1. FC Saarbrücken	30	10	6	14	34	42	−8	26	
13	Eintracht Trier	30	6	12	12	51	71	−20	24	
14	Phönix Bellheim	30	9	5	16	44	67	−23	23	
15	VfR Frankenthal (R)	30	6	9	15	34	50	−16	21	Relegation to Amateurliga
16	SpVgg Andernach (R)	30	2	5	23	29	93	−64	9	Relegation to Amateurliga

Source: Fussballdaten.de (in German)
Rules for classification: 1) Points;
(R) Relegated

== Regionalliga Süd ==
The 1971–72 season saw four new clubs in the league, SV Darmstadt 98, SpVgg Bayreuth and SpVgg Ludwigsburg, all three promoted from the Amateurliga, while Kickers Offenbach had been relegated from the Bundesliga to the league.

Pos	Team	Pld	W	D	L	GF	GA	GD	Pts	Promotion, qualification or relegation
1	Kickers Offenbach (P)	36	21	15	0	99	33	+66	57	Qualification to promotion playoffs
2	Bayern Hof	36	22	8	6	88	42	+46	52	Qualification to promotion playoffs
3	TSV 1860 München	36	18	10	8	62	34	+28	46	
4	Hessen Kassel	36	13	14	9	57	47	+10	40	
5	Karlsruher SC	36	15	7	14	52	44	+8	37	
6	Freiburger FC	36	13	11	12	47	57	−10	37	
7	Darmstadt 98	36	14	8	14	49	44	+5	36	
8	VfR Heilbronn	36	14	8	14	55	59	−4	36	
9	1. FC Nürnberg	36	12	10	14	49	62	−13	34	
10	SSV Reutlingen	36	11	11	14	48	60	−12	33	
11	Stuttgarter Kickers	36	12	9	15	55	71	−16	33	
12	FC Schweinfurt 05	36	12	8	16	56	62	−6	32	
13	SpVgg Bayreuth	36	10	12	14	40	52	−12	32	
14	SpVgg Fürth	36	10	11	15	37	48	−11	31	
15	SpVgg Ludwigsburg	36	9	13	14	42	56	−14	31	
16	Jahn Regensburg (R)	36	10	11	15	47	63	−16	31	
17	Opel Rüsselsheim (R)	36	9	12	15	44	66	−22	30	Relegation to Amateurliga
18	FC 08 Villingen (R)	36	8	12	16	43	53	−10	28	Relegation to Amateurliga
19	ESV Ingolstadt (R)	36	10	8	18	46	63	−17	28	Relegation to Amateurliga

Source: Fussballdaten.de (in German)
Rules for classification: 1) Points;
(P) Promoted; (R) Relegated

== Bundesliga promotion round ==
=== Group 1 ===
Pos	Team	Pld	W	D	L	GF	GA	GD	Pts	Promotion, qualification or relegation
1	Wuppertaler SV (P)	8	8	0	0	26	5	+21	16	Promotion to Bundesliga
2	VfL Osnabrück	8	3	2	3	8	15	−7	8	
3	Borussia Neunkirchen	8	3	0	5	20	16	+4	6	
4	Bayern Hof	8	2	1	5	18	17	+1	5	
5	Tasmania 1900 Berlin	8	2	1	5	8	27	−19	5	

Source: Fussballdaten.de (in German)
Rules for classification: 1) Points;
(P) Promoted

=== Group 2 ===
Pos	Team	Pld	W	D	L	GF	GA	GD	Pts	Promotion, qualification or relegation
1	Kickers Offenbach (P)	8	5	3	0	29	7	+22	13	Promotion to Bundesliga
2	Rot-Weiß Essen	8	5	3	0	22	6	+16	13	
3	FC St. Pauli	8	2	3	3	7	16	−9	7	
4	Wacker 04 Berlin	8	2	1	5	8	29	−21	5	
5	Röchling Völklingen	8	1	0	7	14	22	−8	2	

Source: Fussballdaten.de (in German)
Rules for classification: 1) Points;
(P) Promoted
