= Gerd Menne =

German footballer (1939–2020)

Personal information
- Date of birth: 14 December 1939
- Place of birth: Birkenfeld, Germany
- Date of death: 1 March 2020 (aged 80)
- Height: 1.85 m (6 ft 1 in)
- Position: Defender

Youth career
- VfR Baumholder

Senior career*
Years	Team	Apps	(Gls)
1961–1963	FSV Frankfurt		
1963–1969	VfB Stuttgart		
1969–1970	Stuttgarter Kickers		
1970–1971	Antwerp		

Managerial career
- 1969–1970: Stuttgarter Kickers (player-manager)
- 1971–1974: Eintracht Bad Kreuznach
- 1974–1975: Mainz 05
- 1975–1976: FC Augsburg
- 1977–1978: SpVgg Ludwigsburg
- 1982–1983: Eintracht Bad Kreuznach
- 1983–1987: Hassia Bingen
- 1987–1988: Wormatia Worms
- 2008: Eintracht Bad Kreuznach
- * Club domestic league appearances and goals

Gerd Menne (14 December 1939 – 1 March 2020) was a German football player and manager who played as a defender.
