= 1963–64 Regionalliga =

Regionalliga
- Season: 1963–64
- Champions: FC St. Pauli; SC Tasmania 1900 Berlin; Alemannia Aachen; Borussia Neunkirchen; KSV Hessen Kassel
- Promoted: Borussia Neunkirchen; Hannover 96
- Relegated: VfL Oldenburg; HSV Barmbek-Uhlenhorst; SC Union 06 Berlin; SpVgg Herten; VfB Bottrop; Sportfreunde Siegen; TuS Duisburg 48/99; Lüner SV; ASV Landau; SV Niederlahnstein; SpVgg 03 Neu-Isenburg; Borussia Fulda; BC Augsburg; Amicitia Viernheim

The 1963–64 Regionalliga was the inaugural Regionalliga season. The league operated in five regional divisions, Berlin, North, South, Southwest and West. The five league champions and the runners-up from the west, south, southwest and north then entered a promotion play-off to determine the two clubs to move up to the Bundesliga for the next season. Southwest champions Borussia Neunkirchen and northern runners-up Hannover 96 were promoted.

== Regionalliga Nord ==
=== Table ===
The inaugural 1963–64 season saw 18 clubs in the league, the 13 clubs from the Oberliga Nord that did not qualify for the Bundesliga and five from the Northern German Amateurligas.

Pos	Team	Pld	W	D	L	GF	GA	GD	Pts	Promotion, qualification or relegation
1	FC St. Pauli	34	21	9	4	87	35	+52	51	Qualification to promotion playoffs
2	Hannover 96 (P)	34	22	5	7	78	27	+51	49	Qualification to promotion playoffs
3	Arminia Hannover	34	18	9	7	73	44	+29	45	
4	FC Altona 93	34	21	2	11	82	46	+36	44	
5	Holstein Kiel	34	18	7	9	72	48	+24	43	
6	VfL Osnabrück	34	16	7	11	56	52	+4	39	
7	VfB Oldenburg	34	16	6	12	63	50	+13	38	
8	ASV Bergedorf 85	34	13	9	12	65	65	0	35	
9	VfL Wolfsburg	34	14	6	14	50	61	−11	34	
10	VfR Neumünster	34	12	9	13	56	61	−5	33	
11	Victoria Hamburg	34	9	11	14	49	71	−22	29	
12	TuS Bremerhaven 93	34	9	10	15	48	48	0	28	
13	VfV Hildesheim	34	10	8	16	40	53	−13	28	
14	VfB Lübeck	34	11	5	18	59	78	−19	27	
15	SV Friedrichsort	34	7	10	17	46	85	−39	24	
16	Concordia Hamburg	34	8	7	19	39	62	−23	23	
17	VfL Oldenburg (R)	34	6	11	17	36	69	−33	23	Relegation to Amateurliga
18	HSV Barmbek-Uhlenhorst (R)	34	5	9	20	40	84	−44	19	Relegation to Amateurliga

Source: Fussballdaten.de (in German)
Rules for classification: 1) Points;
(P) Promoted; (R) Relegated

=== Results ===
Home \ Away	A93	ARM	BAR	B85	B93	CON	FRI	H96	HIL	HOL	LÜB	NEU	BOL	LOL	OSN	STP	VIC	WOL
FC Altona 93		2–0	2–0	4–3	1–0	0–2	7–2	4–1	0–1	0–2	4–1	2–0	3–2	1–1	4–0	0–2	1–1	5–0
Arminia Hannover	1–3		6–0	2–2	2–1	1–1	6–0	2–1	2–1	1–1	4–3	3–1	0–0	0–0	4–0	0–1	2–2	3–1
HSV Barmbek-Uhlenhorst	1–9	1–2		2–2	1–4	2–1	1–1	2–3	1–1	1–2	2–1	1–3	0–2	2–2	1–2	0–0	2–2	3–2
ASV Bergedorf 85	0–4	1–3	1–2		2–2	3–0	2–2	1–0	5–2	3–3	4–0	1–0	1–1	4–0	2–2	2–1	2–3	3–2
Bremerhaven 93	1–2	0–1	3–1	0–1		2–1	3–0	1–1	3–1	3–2	3–0	1–2	1–1	0–0	3–0	2–2	3–2	1–2
Concordia Hamburg	1–3	2–5	2–1	1–2	1–1		5–1	0–5	2–1	1–4	0–2	2–0	1–4	4–0	3–0	0–2	1–2	0–3
SV Friedrichsort	0–4	2–2	2–0	3–5	1–0	3–2		1–1	4–1	1–1	7–3	1–2	2–1	1–1	0–1	2–7	1–3	0–3
Hannover 96	4–1	3–0	1–1	2–0	2–1	0–0	2–0		2–0	4–0	7–0	0–2	1–0	3–0	5–1	0–0	2–0	3–0
VfV Hildesheim	1–0	0–3	3–0	1–1	2–2	2–0	0–0	0–5		2–0	1–1	4–2	1–2	1–2	3–0	1–4	0–0	3–0
Holstein Kiel	2–3	2–1	5–1	3–0	1–1	3–0	4–0	2–0	0–0		4–0	3–1	1–1	7–0	2–1	2–3	1–0	2–1
VfB Lübeck	2–1	1–1	4–1	4–2	1–0	2–0	1–3	0–2	1–2	3–1		6–1	6–0	3–0	2–4	2–2	1–3	2–2
VfR Neumünster	3–0	2–2	3–1	2–3	4–1	1–1	2–1	1–4	2–0	2–4	1–1		2–1	2–2	6–1	1–1	3–3	1–1
VfB Oldenburg	3–1	0–2	2–1	2–0	1–1	2–0	3–2	0–2	3–0	6–2	3–2	0–1		2–1	0–3	0–2	3–0	7–0
VfL Oldenburg	1–3	1–4	2–3	1–1	2–1	1–1	0–0	0–2	1–0	2–2	3–0	3–1	3–3		0–2	3–2	0–1	0–2
VfL Osnabrück	1–3	3–0	4–2	2–0	2–2	0–0	5–0	2–1	2–0	2–0	2–0	1–1	2–3	1–0		1–2	2–2	2–0
FC St. Pauli	4–1	2–1	1–1	5–0	3–1	1–2	1–1	4–3	2–2	2–0	4–0	4–0	4–2	1–0	0–0		2–0	6–0
Victoria Hamburg	2–4	3–4	1–1	3–2	1–0	3–2	1–1	0–4	0–3	1–2	2–4	1–1	0–2	4–3	1–4	1–7		0–0
VfL Wolfsburg	1–0	1–3	3–1	1–4	2–0	0–0	5–1	1–2	1–0	1–2	2–0	1–0	2–1	2–2	3–0	4–3	1–1	

Updated to match(es) played on unknown. Source: Almanacco Illustrato del Calcio – La Storia 1898-2004, Panini Edizioni, Modena, September 2005 (in Italian)
Legend: Blue = home team win; Yellow = draw; Red = away team win.

== Regionalliga Berlin ==
The inaugural 1963–64 season saw ten clubs in the league, seven clubs from the Oberliga Berlin and three from the Amateurliga Berlin.

Pos	Team	Pld	W	D	L	GF	GA	GD	Pts	Promotion, qualification or relegation
1	Tasmania 1900 Berlin	27	21	4	2	73	22	+51	46	Qualification to promotion playoffs
2	Tennis Borussia Berlin	27	19	4	4	73	22	+51	42	
3	Wacker 04 Berlin	27	15	4	8	52	45	+7	34	
4	Spandauer SV	27	13	7	7	63	41	+22	33	
5	Blau-Weiß 90 Berlin	27	9	5	13	37	55	−18	23	
6	Hertha Zehlendorf	27	11	2	14	46	47	−1	24	
7	Reinickendorfer Füchse	27	8	5	14	31	46	−15	21	
8	Berliner SV 1892	27	6	7	14	28	49	−21	19	
9	BFC Südring	27	7	3	17	36	64	−28	17	
10	SC Union 06 Berlin (R)	27	4	3	20	23	71	−48	11	Relegation to Amateurliga

Source: Fussballdaten.de (in German)
Rules for classification: 1) Points;
(R) Relegated

== Regionalliga West ==
=== Table ===
The inaugural 1963–64 season saw 20 clubs in the league, the eleven clubs from the Oberliga West that did not qualify for the Bundesliga, eight from the 2. Oberliga West and one club from the Verbandsliga Westfalen, the Lüner SV.

Pos	Team	Pld	W	D	L	GF	GA	GD	Pts	Promotion, qualification or relegation
1	Alemannia Aachen	38	27	5	6	105	37	+68	59	Qualification to promotion playoffs
2	Wuppertaler SV	38	19	14	5	66	36	+30	52	Qualification to promotion playoffs
3	Fortuna Düsseldorf	38	21	8	9	85	50	+35	50	
4	TSV Marl-Hüls	38	20	8	10	56	41	+15	48	
5	SC Viktoria Köln	38	19	7	12	77	53	+24	45	
6	Westfalia Herne	38	17	10	11	69	63	+6	44	
7	Rot-Weiß Oberhausen	38	16	10	12	68	58	+10	42	
8	Borussia Mönchengladbach	38	17	7	14	71	47	+24	41	
9	Duisburger SpV	38	13	13	12	54	55	−1	39	
10	Rot-Weiss Essen	38	13	12	13	70	64	+6	38	
11	Arminia Bielefeld	38	14	10	14	65	74	−9	38	
12	Bayer 04 Leverkusen	38	13	9	16	62	62	0	35	
13	Schwarz-Weiß Essen	38	13	8	17	60	71	−11	34	
14	Sportfreunde Hamborn	38	12	10	16	49	71	−22	34	
15	STV Horst-Emscher	38	11	9	18	56	75	−19	31	
16	SpVgg Herten (R)	38	12	7	19	55	79	−24	31	Relegation to Amateurliga
17	VfB Bottrop (R)	38	11	8	19	53	68	−15	30	Relegation to Amateurliga
18	Sportfreunde Siegen (R)	38	9	11	18	69	85	−16	29	Relegation to Amateurliga
19	TuS Duisburg 48/99 (R)	38	9	4	25	47	88	−41	22	Relegation to Amateurliga
20	Lüner SV (R)	38	5	8	25	41	101	−60	18	Relegation to Amateurliga

Source: Fussballdaten.de (in German)
Rules for classification: 1) Points;
(R) Relegated

=== Results ===
Home \ Away	ALE	ARM	LEV	BOT	MÖN	D48	DUI	FDÜ	HER	HOR	LÜN	MAR	RWE	RWO	SWE	SHA	SFS	VIK	WEH	WUP
Alemannia Aachen		8–0	3–1	2–0	3–0	4–0	6–0	4–1	7–0	6–0	2–0	0–1	3–1	2–1	2–1	5–0	1–0	2–0	1–0	2–0
Arminia Bielefeld	1–1		2–2	4–4	3–2	1–2	1–1	1–0	1–1	2–3	2–0	1–2	3–0	1–0	1–1	6–1	4–2	4–2	2–0	0–3
Bayer Leverkusen	0–2	4–0		2–2	2–0	3–0	1–1	0–1	4–1	3–0	4–1	3–0	1–1	1–1	0–2	0–0	3–1	2–1	3–3	0–0
VfB Bottrop	2–1	0–3	2–1		0–1	6–0	1–1	1–3	2–1	2–1	3–0	2–0	1–1	0–0	1–3	5–0	0–0	0–1	0–1	1–0
Borussia Mönchengladbach	2–3	5–0	0–2	1–1		2–0	1–3	0–0	5–2	4–0	6–1	1–0	3–0	3–1	1–2	2–0	3–1	0–2	2–2	0–1
TuS Duisburg 48/99	2–3	0–2	1–3	2–4	0–3		0–1	0–1	0–1	4–3	4–1	0–1	1–3	4–2	0–1	1–1	4–1	2–4	2–4	2–1
Duisburger SpV	1–2	4–0	3–1	1–0	1–1	1–0		2–4	0–2	2–2	1–1	1–1	1–1	1–1	3–1	3–2	3–1	3–0	1–0	1–1
Fortuna Düsseldorf	5–3	2–0	2–1	4–1	2–1	6–1	3–2		1–2	3–0	3–0	2–3	2–0	8–5	1–1	5–0	6–2	3–2	0–0	1–1
SpVgg Herten	1–2	2–0	5–1	3–1	3–1	1–2	3–2	2–2		2–1	1–1	0–1	0–3	1–2	2–2	0–1	1–1	1–2	0–5	2–3
STV Horst-Emscher	1–1	0–2	3–1	0–0	1–2	2–0	0–1	1–4	4–0		1–1	4–2	3–1	0–2	2–0	3–1	1–1	0–1	0–2	1–2
Lüner SV	2–6	1–3	2–0	2–1	1–2	1–2	3–0	1–1	2–2	2–3		1–4	0–3	2–0	2–2	1–4	3–1	0–7	3–3	2–2
TSV Marl-Hüls	1–1	1–1	4–1	2–0	2–1	3–1	2–0	0–0	2–0	3–0	4–1		1–1	1–0	1–3	2–1	5–1	0–0	2–0	1–1
Rot-Weiss Essen	2–3	3–3	4–3	7–2	1–5	3–1	1–1	0–1	1–2	2–3	4–0	2–0		2–5	2–2	2–4	1–1	1–1	3–1	2–2
Rot-Weiß Oberhausen	3–0	3–2	2–2	2–0	2–1	3–2	2–2	2–1	1–3	2–2	3–1	3–0	0–0		2–0	0–0	4–1	3–1	2–2	1–1
Schwarz-Weiß Essen	1–9	3–4	4–0	0–1	1–5	4–0	2–0	0–2	1–0	6–2	2–0	0–1	0–2	1–0		1–1	1–1	1–3	1–3	1–1
Sportfreunde Hamborn 07	0–0	2–0	2–1	4–0	1–0	1–2	1–1	2–2	5–2	1–1	2–0	1–0	0–4	3–1	2–3		1–2	2–1	2–4	0–2
Sportfreunde Siegen	2–0	3–3	3–4	6–3	1–1	0–0	1–2	2–1	1–1	3–5	4–0	5–1	0–2	1–2	4–3	0–0		5–2	5–1	1–3
SC Viktoria Köln	2–1	3–1	0–1	3–2	1–1	0–0	1–0	3–2	7–1	1–1	4–0	0–1	2–2	1–3	1–0	6–0	4–2		2–1	4–2
Westfalia Herne	1–2	2–0	1–0	3–2	0–2	3–3	1–0	0–0	1–1	2–2	4–2	2–1	3–1	4–2	3–2	3–1	3–3	1–1		0–3
Wuppertaler SV	2–2	1–1	2–1	2–0	1–1	4–2	4–3	4–0	2–0	1–0	1–0	0–0	0–1	1–0	6–1	0–0	3–0	2–1	1–1	

Updated to match(es) played on unknown. Source: Almanacco Illustrato del Calcio – La Storia 1898-2004, Panini Edizioni, Modena, September 2005 (in Italian)
Legend: Blue = home team win; Yellow = draw; Red = away team win.

== Regionalliga Südwest ==
The inaugural 1963–64 season saw 20 clubs in the league, the 14 clubs from the Oberliga Südwest that did not qualify for the Bundesliga and six from the 2. Oberliga Südwest.

Pos	Team	Pld	W	D	L	GF	GA	GD	Pts	Promotion, qualification or relegation
1	Borussia Neunkirchen (P)	38	25	10	3	106	32	+74	60	Qualification to promotion playoffs
2	FK Pirmasens	38	27	5	6	128	49	+79	59	Qualification to promotion playoffs
3	Wormatia Worms	38	25	8	5	85	41	+44	58	
4	1. FSV Mainz 05	38	20	7	11	82	57	+25	47	
5	Eintracht Trier	38	16	11	11	72	68	+4	43	
6	SV Saar 05 Saarbrücken	38	15	12	11	78	52	+26	42	
7	VfR Kaiserslautern	38	16	10	12	65	54	+11	42	
8	Sportfreunde Saarbrücken	38	17	6	15	81	62	+19	40	
9	Phönix Ludwigshafen	38	15	10	13	58	56	+2	40	
10	Ludwigshafener SC	38	17	6	15	66	64	+2	40	
11	TuS Neuendorf	38	16	7	15	84	73	+11	39	
12	TuRa Ludwigshafen	38	14	9	15	64	54	+10	37	
13	Röchling Völklingen	38	11	13	14	65	74	−9	35	
14	SpVgg Weisenau	38	11	12	15	60	77	−17	34	
15	VfR Frankenthal	38	12	8	18	55	77	−22	32	
16	BSC Oppau	38	13	6	19	49	71	−22	32	
17	Phönix Bellheim	38	11	5	22	67	99	−32	27	
18	TSC Zweibrücken	38	8	7	23	50	98	−48	23	
19	ASV Landau (R)	38	6	5	27	39	110	−71	17	Relegation to Amateurliga
20	SV Niederlahnstein (R)	38	6	1	31	37	123	−86	13	Relegation to Amateurliga

Source: Fussballdaten.de (in German)
Rules for classification: 1) Points;
(P) Promoted; (R) Relegated

== Regionalliga Süd ==
The inaugural 1963–64 season saw 20 clubs in the league, the eleven clubs from the Oberliga Süd that did not qualify for the Bundesliga and nine from the 2. Oberliga Süd.

Pos	Team	Pld	W	D	L	GF	GA	GD	Pts	Promotion, qualification or relegation
1	KSV Hessen Kassel	38	25	5	8	116	61	+55	55	Qualification to promotion playoffs
2	Bayern Munich	38	22	8	8	115	61	+54	52	Qualification to promotion playoffs
3	Kickers Offenbach	38	21	8	9	96	66	+30	50	
4	Schwaben Augsburg	38	19	11	8	77	56	+21	49	
5	SSV Reutlingen	38	19	9	10	76	61	+15	47	
6	VfR Mannheim	38	18	9	11	68	50	+18	45	
7	FC Schweinfurt 05	38	17	9	12	82	55	+27	43	
8	TSG Ulm 1846	38	20	2	16	73	74	−1	42	
9	SpVgg Fürth	38	14	11	13	68	61	+7	39	
10	Freiburger FC	38	14	9	15	58	61	−3	37	
11	SV Waldhof Mannheim	38	15	6	17	56	60	−4	36	
12	ESV Ingolstadt	38	12	11	15	61	81	−20	35	
13	FC Bayern Hof	38	12	9	17	61	64	−3	33	
14	Stuttgarter Kickers	38	12	9	17	54	74	−20	33	
15	1. FC Pforzheim	38	12	9	17	51	75	−24	33	
16	FSV Frankfurt	38	13	5	20	69	85	−16	31	
17	SpVgg 03 Neu-Isenburg (R)	38	11	5	22	49	80	−31	27	Relegation to Amateurliga
18	Borussia Fulda (R)	38	8	10	20	53	77	−24	26	Relegation to Amateurliga
19	BC Augsburg (R)	38	10	5	23	48	90	−42	25	Relegation to Amateurliga
20	Amicitia Viernheim (R)	38	8	6	24	47	86	−39	22	Relegation to Amateurliga

Source: Fussballdaten.de (in German)
Rules for classification: 1) Points;
(R) Relegated

== Promotion playoffs ==
=== Decider ===
The runners-up of the Regionalliga West and Regionalliga Südwest played a two-leg decider to determined which team qualified for the group stage, which FK Pirmasens won on aggregate.

Team 1	Agg.	Team 2	1st leg	2nd leg
Wuppertaler SV (W)	1–4	FK Pirmasens (SW)	0–2	1–2

=== Group 1 ===
==== Table ====
Pos	Team	Pld	W	D	L	GF	GA	GR	Pts	Promotion
1	Borussia Neunkirchen (C)	6	4	0	2	9	6	1.500	8	Promotion to 1964–65 Bundesliga
2	Bayern Munich	6	3	1	2	12	7	1.714	7	
3	Tasmania Berlin	6	2	2	2	12	9	1.333	6	
4	FC St. Pauli	6	1	1	4	8	18	0.444	3	

Source: Fussballdaten.de
Rules for classification: 1) points; 2) goal ratio.
(C) Champions

==== Results ====
Home \ Away	NKI	MUN	TAB	STP
Borussia Neunkirchen		0–1	1–0	4–1
Bayern Munich	0–2		1–1	6–1
Tasmania Berlin	5–1	3–0		3–3
FC St. Pauli	0–1	0–4	3–0	

Updated to match(es) played on unknown. Source: Fussballdaten.de
Legend: Blue = home team win; Yellow = draw; Red = away team win.

=== Group 2 ===
==== Table ====
Pos	Team	Pld	W	D	L	GF	GA	GR	Pts	Promotion
1	Hannover 96 (C)	6	5	0	1	15	6	2.500	10	Promotion to 1964–65 Bundesliga
2	KSV Hessen Kassel	6	3	0	3	11	12	0.917	6	
3	Alemannia Aachen	6	2	0	4	10	12	0.833	4	
4	FK Pirmasens	6	2	0	4	10	16	0.625	4	

Source: Fussballdaten.de
Rules for classification: 1) points; 2) goal ratio.
(C) Champions

==== Results ====
Home \ Away	H96	KAS	AAC	PIR
Hannover 96		3–1	2–1	2–0
KSV Hessen Kassel	1–2		2–0	1–4
Alemannia Aachen	3–2	1–2		5–1
FK Pirmasens	0–4	2–4	3–0	

Updated to match(es) played on unknown. Source: Fussballdaten.de
Legend: Blue = home team win; Yellow = draw; Red = away team win.
