= 2. Oberliga Südwest =

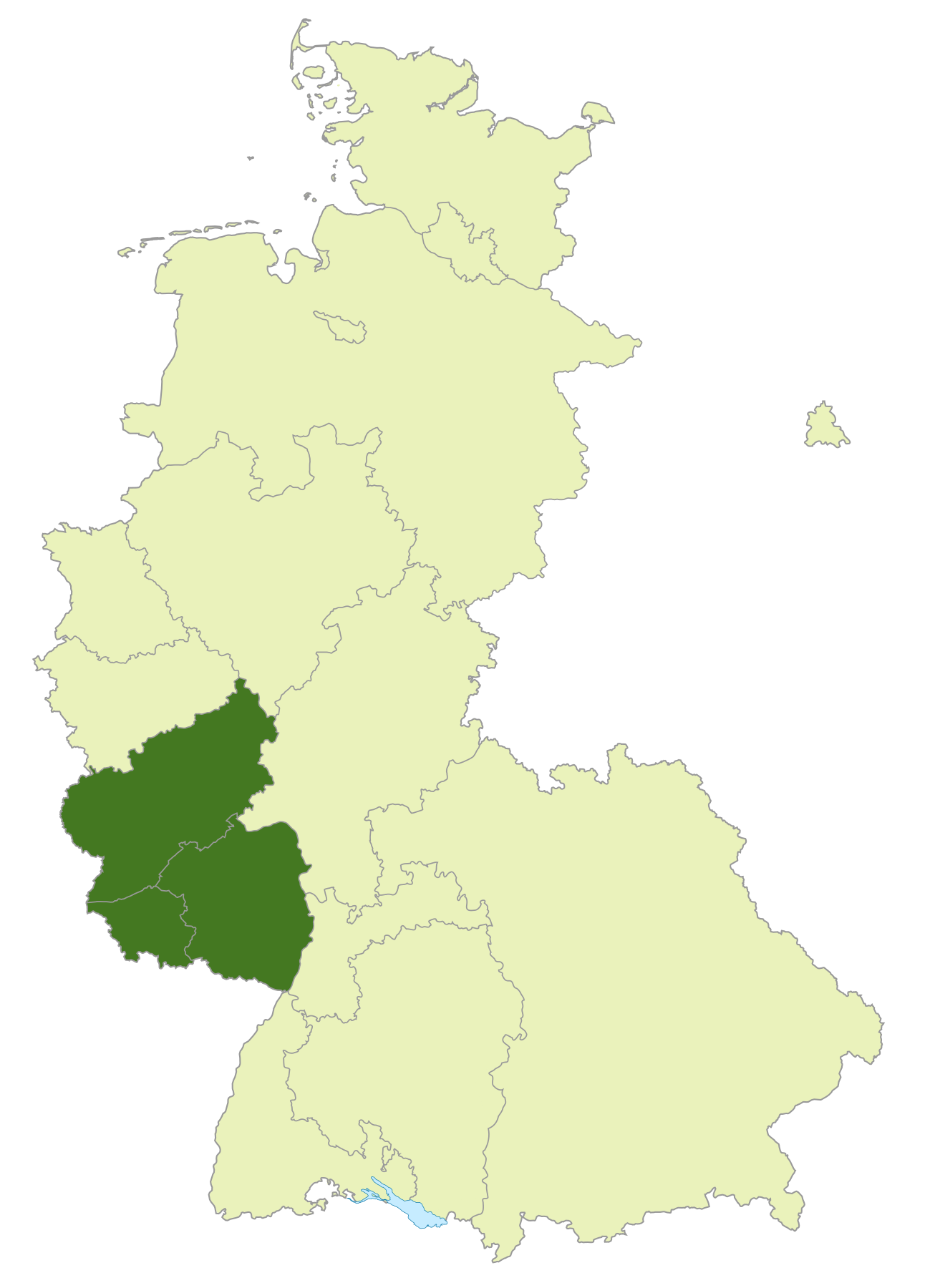
- Founded: 1951
- Folded: 1963 (12 seasons)
- Replaced by: Regionalliga Südwest
- Country: Germany
- State: Rhineland-Palatinate; Saarland
- Level on pyramid: Level 2
- Promotion to: Oberliga Südwest
- Relegation to: Amateurliga Rheinland; Amateurliga Saarland; Amateurliga Südwest
- Last champions: Phönix Ludwigshafen (1962–63)

The 2. Oberliga Südwest (English: 2nd Premier league Southwest) was the second-highest level of the German football league system in the southwest of Germany from 1951 until the formation of the Bundesliga in 1963. It covered the two states of Rhineland-Palatinate and Saarland.

== Overview ==
The 2. Oberliga Südwest was formed in 1951 as a feeder league to the Oberliga Südwest which had been operating from 1945. It was the last of the three second Oberligas, the other two being 2. Oberliga West (1949) and 2. Oberliga Süd (1950).

The winners and runners-up of this league were promoted to the Oberliga Südwest, the bottom two teams relegated to the Amateurligas. Below the 2. Oberliga were the following Amateurligas:

- Rheinland (split into two groups from 1956 to 1963)
- Saarland
- Südwest

The TSC Zweibrücken was the only club to play all twelve seasons in the league.

== Disbanding of the 2. Oberliga ==
In 1963 the league was dissolved. Six of its clubs went to the new Regionalliga Südwest, the new second division. The other ten teams were relegated to the Amateurligas.

The following teams were admitted to the new Regionalliga:

- Phönix Ludwigshafen
- Eintracht Trier
- SpVgg Weisenau
- Phönix Bellheim
- SV Röchling Völklingen
- TSC Zweibrücken

The following teams were relegated to the Amateurliga:

- Saarland: SC Friedrichsthal, SV Ludweiler, VfB Theley, SV St. Ingbert
- Rheinland: VfB Wissen, Germania Metternich, FV Engers 07
- Südwest: FV Speyer, FSV Schifferstadt, BFV Hassia Bingen

== Winners and runners-up of the 2. Oberliga Südwest ==
The winners and runners-up of the league:

Season	Winner	Runner-Up
1951–52	VfR Kirn	FV Speyer
1952–53	ASV Landau	VfR Frankenthal
1953–54	Sportfreunde Saarbrücken	Eintracht Kreuznach
1954–55	SpVgg Andernach	FV Engers
1955–56	Sportfreunde Saarbrücken	FV Speyer
1956–57	SV St. Ingbert	TuRa Ludwigshafen
1957–58	SpVgg Weisenau	Sportfreunde Saarbrücken
1958–59	VfR Kaiserslautern	SC Ludwigshafen
1959–60	SV Niederlahnstein	TuS Neuendorf
1960–61	VfR Kaiserslautern	BSC Oppau
1961–62	SV Niederlahnstein	VfR Frankenthal
1962–63	Phönix Ludwigshafen	Eintracht Trier

== Placings in the 2. Oberliga Südwest ==
The league placings from 1951 to 1963:

Club	52	53	54	55	56	57	58	59	60	61	62	63
Eintracht Bad Kreuznach	S	5	2	S	S	S	S	S	S	S	S	S
TuRa Ludwigshafen	S	S	S	S	S	2	S	S	S	S	S	S
Sportfreunde Saarbrücken		13	1	S	1	S	2	S	S	S	S	S
SC Ludwigshafen	7	10	3	9	9	15		2	S	S	S	S
TuS Neuendorf	S	S	S	S	S	S	S	S	2	S	S	S
VfR Kaiserslautern	S	S	S	S	S	S	S	1	S	1	S	S
BSC Oppau			13	6	10	4	12	6	3	2	S	S
SV Niederlahnstein						9	4	14	1	S	1	S
VfR Frankenthal	S	2	S	S	S	S	S	S	S	S	2	S
Phönix Ludwigshafen	S	S	S	S	S	S	S	S	S	S	S	1
Eintracht Trier	S	S	S	S	S	S	S	S	S	S	S	2
SpVgg Weisenau	S	16		12	13	6	1	S	6	10	11	3
Phönix Bellheim												4
SV Röchling Völklingen											7	5
VfB Wissen												6
BFV Hassia Bingen	3	S	6	7	16				9	7	9	7
TSC Zweibrücken	8	4	5	4	8	8	10	12	13	5	5	8
FSV Schifferstadt										8	10	9
Germania Metternich							15			4	12	10
VfB Theley								11	14	14	13	11
SV Ludweiler-Warndt				8	7	7	7	13	11	13	6	12
SV St. Ingbert					12	1	S	4	7	6	14	13
FV Engers	S	S	7	2	S	3	3	7	5	12	8	14
SC Friedrichsthal									8	9	3	15
FV Speyer	2	S	S	S	2	S	S	S	S	3	4	16
ASC Dudweiler			14	11	6	10	6	9	10	11	15	
SG Sobernheim											16	
SpVgg Andernach	5	3	12	1	S	S	9	10	12	15		
Viktoria Sulzbach		11	10	15		11	13	5	4	16		
FC 08 Homburg							11	3	15			
ASV Landau	6	1	S	14	3	5	8	8	16			
VfL Trier					5	13	14	15				
VfR Kirn	1	S	S	13	4	12	5	16				
VfL Neuwied	10	8	4	5	14	14	16					
ASV Hochfeld	7	10	3	9	9	15						
Sportfreunde Herdorf	11	7	8	3	11	16						
SG Pirmasens	4	9	9	10	15							
SC 07 Bad Neuenahr	12	6	11	16								
SC Altenkessel		12	15									
1. FC Idar	9	14	16									
VfL Neustadt	S	15										
VfB Lützel	13											
TuS Konz	14											

Source:"2nd Oberliga Südwest". Das deutsche Fussball-Archiv. Archived from the original on 5 January 2008.

=== Key ===
Symbol	Key
S	Oberliga Südwest
1	League champions
Place	League
Blank	Played at a league level below this league
