= Andreas Kröhler =

German footballer

Personal information
- Date of birth: 1 November 1966 (age 60)
- Position: Forward

Youth career
- 1973–1975: ATSV Wattenheim
- 1975–1976: Tura 1904 Albsheim
- 1976–1985: TSG Eisenberg

Senior career*
Years	Team	Apps	(Gls)
1985–1988	TSG Eisenberg		
1988–1996	1. FC Kaiserslautern II		
1991–1992	1. FC Kaiserslautern	2	(0)
1996–1997	VfR Grünstadt		
1997–1998	Wormatia Worms	18	(0)
- * Club domestic league appearances and goals

Andreas Kröhler (born 1 November 1966) is a former German football player who played as a forward. Krohler has played in the European Cup and Bundesliga with 1. FC Kaiserslautern.

== Career statistics ==
Appearances and goals by club, season and competition
Club	Season	League			National Cup		Europe		Other		Total	
Club	Season	Division	Apps	Goals	Apps	Goals	Apps	Goals	Apps	Goals	Apps	Goals
1. FC Kaiserslautern	1991–92	Bundesliga	2	0	1	0	1 (Note: Appearance(s) in European Cup)	0	0	0	4	0
Wormatia Worms	1997–98	Verbandsliga Südwest	15	0	—		—		0	0	15	0
Wormatia Worms	1998–99	Oberliga Südwest	3	0	—		—		0	0	3	0
Wormatia Worms	Total		18	0	0	0	0	0	0	0	18	0
Career total			20	0	1	0	1	0	0	0	22	0
