= Verbandsliga Südwest =

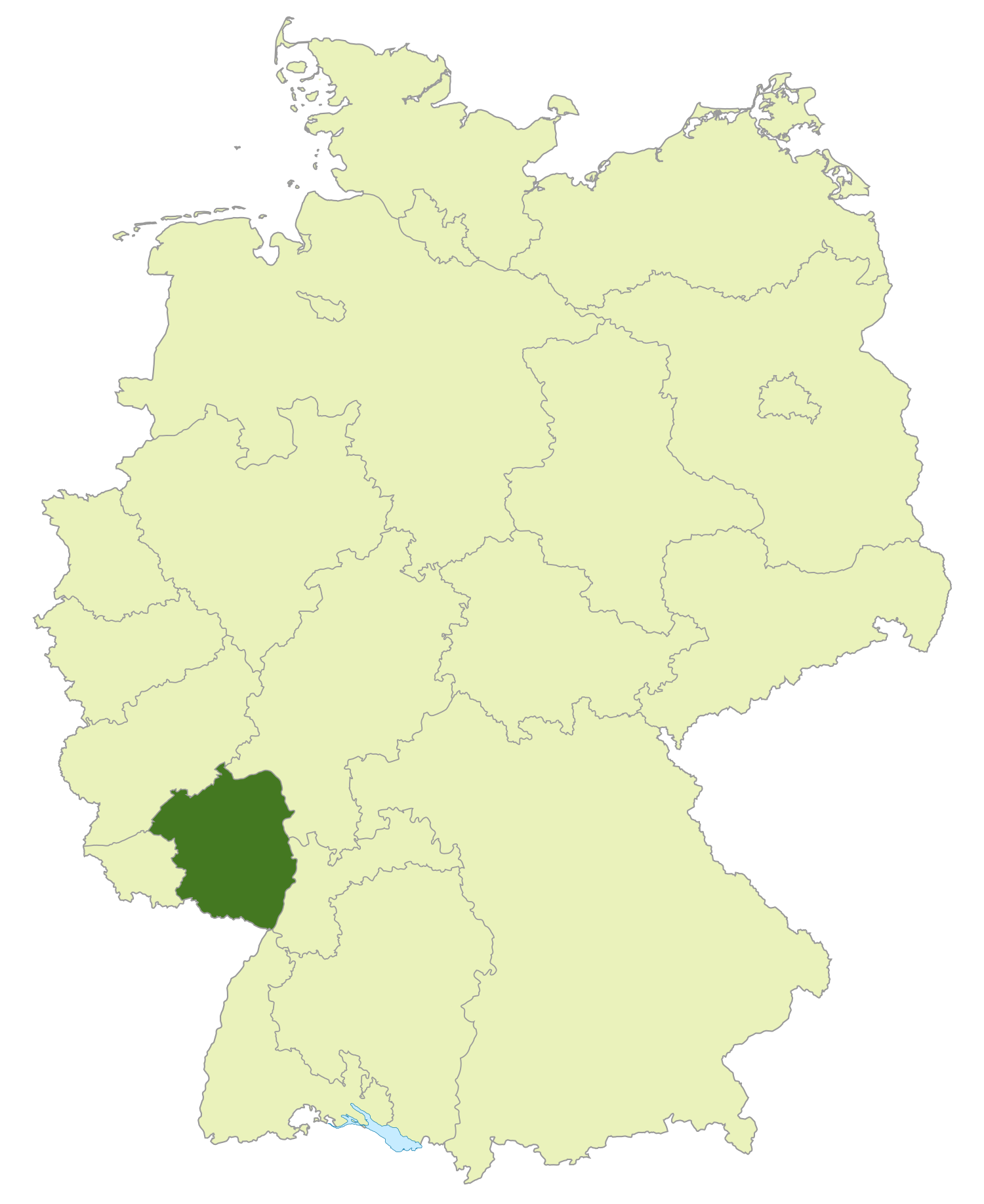
- Organising body: Southwest German Football Association
- Founded: 1952
- Country: Germany
- State: Rhineland-Palatinate
- Region: Rhenish Hesse; Palatinate
- Number of clubs: 18
- Level on pyramid: Level 6
- Promotion to: Oberliga Rheinland-Pfalz/Saar
- Relegation to: Landesliga Südwest-Ost; Landesliga Südwest-West
- Domestic cup(s): South West Cup
- Current champions: SC 07 Idar-Oberstein (2023–24)

The Verbandsliga Südwest is a German amateur football division administered by the Southwest German Football Association, one of the 21 German state football associations. Being the top flight of the Southwestern state association, the Verbandsliga is a level 6 division of the German football league system.

== Overview ==
The Amateurliga Südwest was formed in 1952 in the southern half of the state of Rhineland-Palatinate. Before its inception, three separate leagues operated in the area as the highest level of play. The league was a feeder league to the 2. Oberliga Südwest. From 1952 until the establishment of the Oberliga Südwest in 1978, it was the third tier of the football league system.

The winner of the Amateurliga Südwest was not automatically promoted to its superior league but rather had to take part in a promotion play-off. The champion would have to compete with the winners of the Amateurligen Saarland and Rheinland.

Until 1933, the region covered by the Southwest FA was politically part of two other German states during the Weimar Republic era. The south, the Palatinate (Pfalz) region, was part of Bavaria and the north, the Rhenish Hesse (Rheinhessen) region, was part of Hesse. This explains the seemingly odd fact that there are two clubs in the Südwest region named "Bavaria", FC Bavaria Wörth and FC Bavaria Ebernburg. From 1933 to 1945, most of the region was part of the Gau Saar-Palatinate. After the war, these regions were incorporated into the new state of Rhineland-Palatinate. The separation of these areas from their original states resulted from the outcome of the Second World War when they became part of the French occupation zone, while Hessen and Bavaria were in the US zone.

The league was established in 1952 with sixteen teams, the winner gaining promotion to the 2nd Oberliga Südwest. The founder members were:

- BSC Oppau
- VfR Friesenheim
- FSV Schifferstadt
- Phönix Bellheim
- SV Alsenborn
- TuS Hochspeyer
- SpVgg Idar
- Palatia Böhl
- SC Oberstein 08
- ESC West-Kaiserslautern
- SpVgg Ingelheim
- SV Gonsenheim
- Fontana Finthen
- FC Sobernheim
- SG Waldfischbach
- SV Mundenheim

With the introduction of the Bundesliga in 1963 the Amateurliga was placed below the new Regionalliga Südwest but still retained its third-tier status. It continued to do so after the introduction of the 2nd Bundesliga Süd in 1974.

The 1. FC Kaiserslautern II holds the record for years in the Amateurliga, having spent 21 continuous seasons in it from 1957 to 1978.

The Amateurliga Südwest was renamed in 1978, now becoming the Verbandsliga Südwest. At the same time as this, the Oberliga Südwest was reformed, now as the third tier of the league system. The top five teams out of the Amateurliga went to the new Oberliga while the teams from place 6 to 16 found themselves in the Verbandsliga. The bottom four teams were relegated. The new Verbandsliga was now the fourth tier of the league system.

The winner of the Verbandsliga Südwest, like the winners of the Saarlandliga and Rheinlandliga gains direct promotion to the Oberliga Rheinland-Pfalz/Saar, formerly the Oberliga Südwest. The runners-up will only get a chance for promotion when there is additional spots to fill in the Oberliga, like 1994 when the Regionalligen were introduced and Hassia Bingen was promoted.

There is room for misunderstanding in the existence of an Oberliga and a Verbandsliga Südwest. While the Oberliga covers the two states of Saarland and Rhineland-Palatinate, the Verbandsliga covers only the southern half of Rhineland-Palatinate.

Feeder Leagues to the Verbandsliga Südwest

- Landesliga Südwest-Ost
- Landesliga Südwest-West

== League champions ==
The league champions:

Season	Club
1952–53	**BSC Oppau**
1953–54	**SpVgg Weisenau**
1954–55	FC Sobernheim
1955–56	Normannia Pfiffigheim
1956–57	Hassia Bingen
1957–58	**SC Ludwigshafen**
1958–59	**Hassia Bingen**
1959–60	1. FC Kaiserslautern II
1960–61	**FC Sobernheim**
1961–62	**Phönix Bellheim**
1962–63	**ASV Landau**
1963–64	Eintracht Kreuznach
1964–65	**SV Alsenborn**
1965–66	VfR Kaiserslautern
1966–67	**SC Ludwigshafen**
1967–68	1. FC Kaiserslautern II
1968–69	**ASV Landau**
1969–70	**VfR Frankenthal**
1970–71	**Phönix Bellheim**
1971–72	Eintracht Kreuznach
1972–73	**Eintracht Kreuznach**
1973–74	FK Clausen
1974–75	**Eintracht Kreuznach**
1975–76	VfR Wormatia Worms

Season	Club
1976–77	**VfR Wormatia Worms**
1977–78	FSV Mainz 05
1978–79	**Viktoria Herxheim**
1979–80	**TuS Landstuhl**
1980–81	**FK Clausen**
1981–82	**VfL Neustadt**
1982–83	**1. FC Kaiserslautern II**
1983–84	**SC Birkenfeld**
1984–85	**FK Clausen**
1985–86	**SV Edenkoben**
1986–87	**Viktoria Herxheim**
1987–88	**SV Edenkoben**
1988–89	**SV Geinsheim**
1989–90	**SC Hauenstein**
1990–91	**Viktoria Herxheim**
1991–92	**TSG Pfeddersheim**
1992–93	**SC Hauenstein**
1993–94	**1. FC Kaiserslautern II**
1994–95	**SC Idar-Oberstein**
1995–96	**RW Olympia Alzey**
1996–97	**FK Pirmasens**
1997–98	**VfR Wormatia Worms**
1998–99	**1. FSV Mainz 05 II**
1999–2000	**Eintracht Bad Kreuznach**

Season	Club
2000–01	**SpVgg Ingelheim**
2001–02	**SV Weingarten**
2002–03	**Hassia Bingen**
2003–04	**TuS Mechtersheim**
2004–05	**FSV Oggersheim**
2005–06	**TuS Hohenecken**
2006–07	**SC Idar-Oberstein**
2007–08	**SV Niederauerbach**
2008–09	**BFV Hassia Bingen**
2009–10	**SV Gonsenheim**
2010–11	**Arminia Ludwigshafen**
2011–12	**TSG Pfeddersheim**
2012–13	**Alemannia Waldalgesheim**
2013–14	**TSV Schott Mainz**
2014–15	**FK Pirmasens II**
2015–16	**TuS Mechtersheim**
2016–17	**FV Dudenhofen**
2017–18	**Arminia Ludwigshafen**
2018–19	**SV Gonsenheim**
2019–20	**Alemannia Waldagesheim**
2020–21	Season curtailed and annulled
2021–22	**SV Morlautern**
2022–23	**VfR Baumholder**
2023–24	**SC Idar-Oberstein**

Source: "Verbandsliga Südwest". Das deutsche Fussball-Archiv.

- **bold** denotes club gained promotion.
- In 1960, FSV Schifferstadt was promoted as runners-up since Kaiserslautern's reserve team was ineligible for promotion. For the same reason, FV Speyer was promoted in 1968.
- In 1994 and 2018, the runner-up Hassia Bingen was also promoted.
- In 2016 and 2019, the runners-up SV Morlautern and FV Dudenhofen were promoted respectively after play-offs.
