= Southwestern Cup =

South West Cup
- Founded: 1973
- Region: Rhineland-Palatinate, Germany
- Qualifier for: DFB-Pokal
- Current champions: Schott Mainz (2025–26)
- Most championships: 1. FSV Mainz 05 (8 titles)

The South West Cup (German: Südwestpokal) is one of the 21 regional cup competitions of German football. The winner of the competition gains entry to the first round of the German Cup. It is limited to clubs from the Rheinhessen-Pfalz region of Rhineland-Palatinate, however, teams from the Bundesliga and 2. Bundesliga are not permitted to compete. It is one of two cup competitions in the state, the other being the Rhineland Cup, which covers roughly the northern half of the state.

The competition is sponsored by the Bitburger brewery and carries the name Bitburger-Verbandspokal. It is operated by the South West German Football Association, the SWFV.

== History ==
The Cup was established in 1973. The South West Cup is played annually.

From 1974 onwards, the winner of the South West Cup qualified for the first round of the German Cup.

Since the establishment of the 3. Liga in 2008, reserve teams can not take part in the German Cup anymore, but are permitted to play in the regional competitions. For the 2007–08 cup winner, 1. FC Kaiserslautern II, this meant the runners-up, SV Niederauerbach, was qualified instead for the 2008–09 DFB-Pokal.

== Modus ==
Clubs from fully professional leagues are not permitted to enter the competition, meaning, no teams from the Bundesliga and the 2. Bundesliga can compete.

All clubs from the South West playing in the 3. Liga (III), Regionalliga West (IV), Oberliga Südwest (V), Verbandsliga Südwest (VI) and the two Landesligas (VII) gain direct entry to the first round. Additionally, all clubs that have reached the quarter finals of the two Bezirkspokale, the two regional cup competitions staged for teams below the'Landesligas, also enter the competition. In 2007, for example, 129 clubs took part. The lower classed team always receives home advantage, except in the final, which is played on neutral ground.

== Cup finals ==
Held annually at the end of season, these were the cup finals since 1974:

Season	Winner	Finalist	Result	Location, Date	Attendance
1973–74	FC Rodalben				
1974–75	ASV Landau				
1975–76	Wormatia Worms				
1976–77	SG Eintracht Bad Kreuznach				
1977–78	SG Eintracht Bad Kreuznach				
1978–79	1. FC Kaiserslautern II				
1979–80	1. FSV Mainz 05				
1980–81	BFV Hassia Bingen				
1981–82	1. FSV Mainz 05				
1982–83	BFV Hassia Bingen				
1983–84	SV Südwest Ludwigshafen				
1984–85	SC Birkenfeld				
1985–86	1. FSV Mainz 05				
1986–87	SV Südwest Ludwigshafen				
1987–88	Wormatia Worms				
1988–89	TSG Pfeddersheim				
1989–90	SV Südwest Ludwigshafen				
1990–91	SV Viktoria Herxheim				
1991–92	Wormatia Worms				
1992–93	TSG Pfeddersheim				
1993–94	SV Edenkoben				
1994–95	TSG Pfeddersheim				
1995–96	TSG Pfeddersheim				
1996–97	1. FC Kaiserslautern II	SV Viktoria Herxheim	2–1	29 May 1997	
1997–98	SC Idar-Oberstein				
1998–99	FK Pirmasens				
1999–2000	TSG Pfeddersheim	1. FC Kaiserslautern II	2–2 (4–2 pen)	Neustadt, 7 June 2000	400
2000–01	1. FSV Mainz 05 II	VfR Grünstadt	1–0	Bad Kreuznach, 7 June 2001	400
2001–02	1. FSV Mainz 05 II	1. FC Kaiserslautern II	3–0	Alzey, 30 May 2002	1,500
2002–03	1. FSV Mainz 05 II	1. FC Kaiserslautern II	1–0	Worms, 3 June 2003	800
2003–04	1. FSV Mainz 05 II	SC Hauenstein	3–1	Ludwigshafen, 3 June 2004	500
2004–05	1. FSV Mainz 05 II	SC Hauenstein	2–0	Grünstadt, 25 May 2005	
2005–06	FK Pirmasens	1. FSV Mainz 05 II	2–1	Alzey, 24 May 2006	1,150
2006–07	Wormatia Worms	1. FC Kaiserslautern II	1–0	Ludwigshafen, 1 May 2007	3,700
2007–08	1. FC Kaiserslautern II	SV Niederauerbach	2–1	21 May 2008	
2008–09	Wormatia Worms	FSV Oggersheim	5–1	19 May 2009	
2009–10	FK Pirmasens	FV Dudenhofen	3–0	Offenbach, 26 May 2010	
2010–11	SVN Zweibrücken	SC Idar-Oberstein	2–1 pen	31 May 2011	
2011–12	Wormatia Worms	FK Pirmasens	4–1	Idar-Oberstein, 22 May 2012	
2012–13	TSG Pfeddersheim	Arminia Ludwigshafen	4–3 pen	Bobenheim-Roxheim, 29 May 2013	
2013–14	SV Alemannia Waldalgesheim	SVN Zweibrücken	1–0	Mehlingen, 14 May 2014	1,005
2014–15	FK Pirmasens	FV Dudenhofen	1–0	Offenbach, 13 May 2015	2,500
2015–16	SC Hauenstein	TSV Schott Mainz	2–1 (aet)	Römerberg, 28 May 2016	1,002
2016–17	SV Morlautern	Wormatia Worms	2–1	Pirmasens, 25 May 2017	2,410
2017–18	Wormatia Worms	SV Alemannia Waldalgesheim	3–1 (a.e.t.)	Worms, 21 May 2018	3,393
2018–19	1. FC Kaiserslautern	Wormatia Worms	3–1	Pirmasens, 25 May 2019	7,343
2019–20	1. FC Kaiserslautern	SV Alemannia Waldalgesheim	5–3 pen	Pirmasens, 22 August 2020	400
2021–22	Schott Mainz	FK Pirmasens	3–0	Weingarten, 21 May 2022	1,008
2022–23	Schott Mainz	Wormatia Worms	7–6 pen	Pirmasens, 3 June 2023	
2023–24	Schott Mainz	SV Gonsenheim	4–1	Ingelheim, 25 May 2024	2,182
2024–25	FK Pirmasens	Schott Mainz	2–1	Weingarten, 24 May 2025	1,628
2025–26	Schott Mainz	FK Pirmasens	2–1	Weingarten, 23 May 2026	1,512

== Winners ==
Listed in order of wins, the Cup winners are:

Club	Wins
1. FSV Mainz 05 II ^{1}	8
Wormatia Worms	7
TSG Pfeddersheim	6
1. FC Kaiserslautern II^{2}	5
FK Pirmasens	5
TSV Schott Mainz	4
SV Südwest Ludwigshafen	3
BFV Hassia Bingen	2
SG Eintracht Bad Kreuznach	2
Alemannia Waldalgesheim	1
SVN Zweibrücken	1
SC Idar-Oberstein	1
SV Edenkoben	1
SV Viktoria Herxheim	1
SC Birkenfeld	1
ASV Landau	1
FC Rodalben	1
SC Hauenstein	1
SV Morlautern	1

^{1} Includes three wins by 1. FSV Mainz 05
^{2} Includes two wins by 1. FC Kaiserslautern
