= Regionalliga Südwest (1963–1974) =

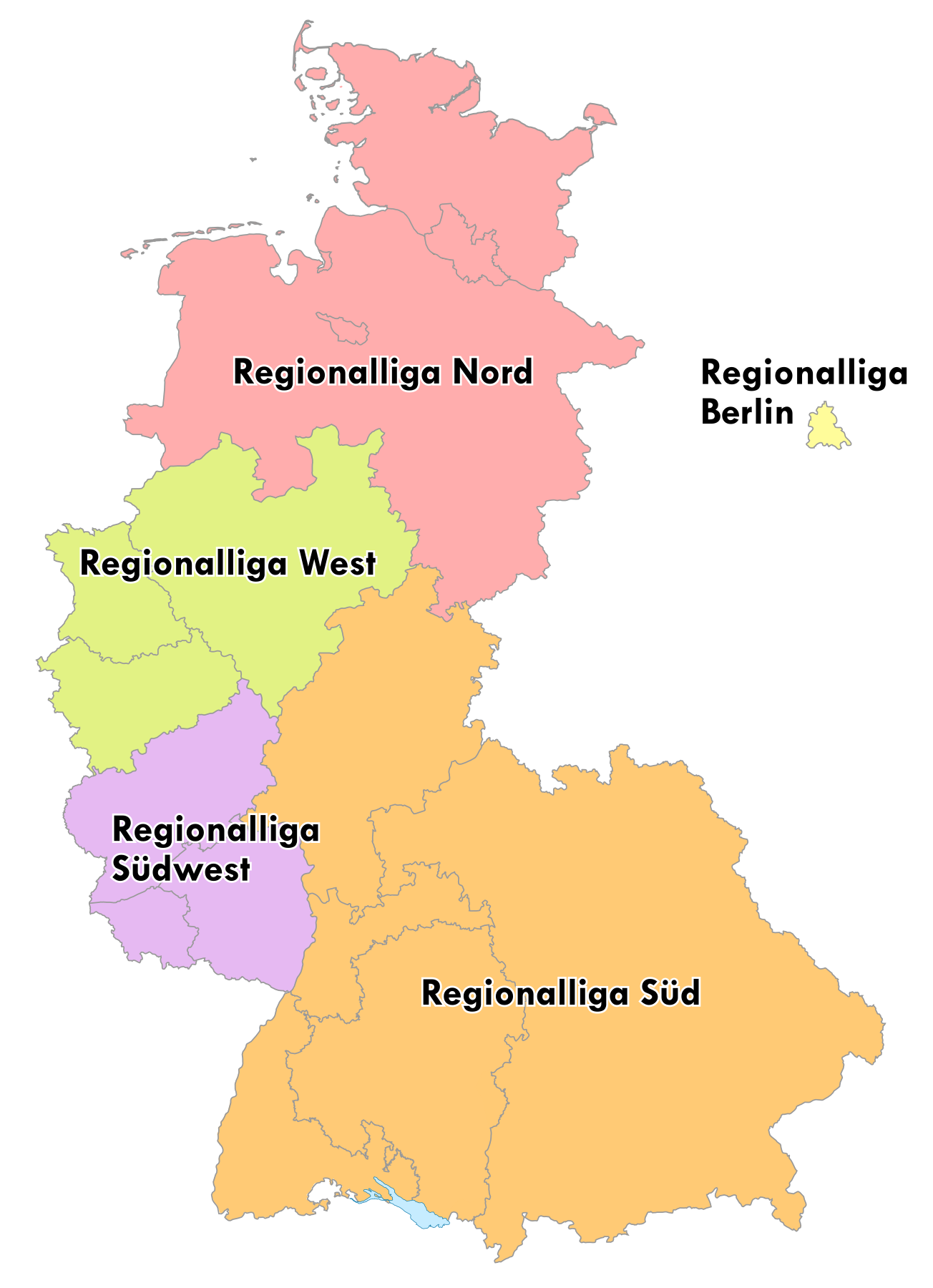
- Founded: 1963
- Folded: 1974 (11 seasons)
- Replaced by: 2. Bundesliga Süd
- Country: West Germany
- States: Rheinland-Pfalz; Saarland
- Level on pyramid: Level 2
- Promotion to: Bundesliga
- Relegation to: Amateurliga Rheinland; Amateurliga Saarland; Amateurliga Südwest
- Last champions: Borussia Neunkirchen (1973–74)

The Regionalliga Südwest was the second-highest level of the German football league system in the southwest of West Germany from 1963 until the formation of the 2. Bundesliga in 1974. It covered the states of Saarland and Rheinland-Pfalz.

== Overview ==
Along with the Regionalliga Südwest went another four Regionalligas, these five formed the second tier of German football until 1974:

- Regionalliga Nord, covering the states of Niedersachsen, Schleswig-Holstein, Bremen and Hamburg
- Regionalliga West, covering the state of Nordrhein-Westfalen
- Regionalliga Berlin, covering West-Berlin
- Regionalliga Süd, covering the states of Bayern, Hessen and Baden-Württemberg

The new Regionalligas were formed along the borders of the old post-World War II Oberligas, not after a balanced regional system. Therefore the Oberligas Berlin and West covered small but populous areas while Nord and Süd covered large areas. Südwest was something of an anachronism, neither large nor populous. It was basically a remainder of the former French occupation zone.

Originally only the winners, later also runners-up of this league were admitted to the promotion play-off to the new Bundesliga, which was staged in two groups of originally four, later five teams each with the winner of each group going up.

The bottom three teams were relegated to the Amateurligas. Below the Regionalliga Südwest were the following Amateurligas:

- Amateurliga Saarland
- Amateurliga Rheinland
- Amateurliga Südwest

The FSV Mainz 05, VfR Wormatia Worms, FK Pirmasens, SV Röchling Völklingen, Südwest Ludwigshafen and TuS Neuendorf all played every one of the eleven seasons of the Regionalliga Südwest.

== Disbanding of the Regionalliga Südwest ==
The league was dissolved in 1974. According to their performance of the last couple of seasons, seven clubs of the Regionalliga went to the new 2. Bundesliga Süd. The nine remaining clubs were relegated to the Amateurligas.

The teams admitted to the 2. Bundesliga Süd were:

- Borussia Neunkirchen
- 1. FC Saarbrücken
- FC Homburg
- SV Röchling Völklingen
- FSV Mainz 05
- VfR Wormatia Worms
- FK Pirmasens

Relegated clubs:

- to the Amateurliga Saarland: VfB Theley, FC Ensdorf
- to the Amateurliga Rheinland: TuS Neuendorf, Eisbachtaler Sportfreunde
- to the Amateurliga Südwest: ASV Landau, Eintracht Kreuznach, SV Alsenborn, Südwest Ludwigshafen, FV Speyer

== Qualifying to the 2. Bundesliga ==
From the Regionalliga Südwest, seven clubs qualified for the new 2. Bundesliga Süd, together with 13 teams from the Süd region.

The qualifying modus saw the last five seasons counted, whereby the last placed team in each season received one point, the second-last two points and so on. For a Bundesliga season within this five-year period, a club received 25 points, for an Amateurliga season none.

For the seasons 1969–70 and 1970–71, the received points counted single, for the 1971–72 and 1972–73 season double and for the 1973–74 season three times.

To be considered in the points table for the new league, a club had to play either in the Regionalliga Südwest in 1973-74 or to have been relegated from the Bundesliga to it for the next season, something which did not apply to the league that year.

The bottom three clubs in the league, nominally the relegated teams in a normal season, were barred from entry to the 2. Bundesliga, regardless of where they stood in the points ranking.

Points table:

Rank	Club	Points 1969-74	Place in 1973-74
1	Borussia Neunkirchen	133	1
2	SV Röchling Völklingen	110	4
3	FSV Mainz 05	109	5
4	FK Pirmasens	107	8
5	SV Alsenborn ^{1}	95	10
6	FC 08 Homburg	90	3
7	VfR Wormatia Worms	90	6
8	1. FC Saarbrücken	87	2
9	ASV Landau	82	9
10	Südwest Ludwigshafen	76	11
11	TuS Neuendorf	71	12
12	FV Speyer	43	15
13	Eintracht Bad Kreuznach	30	7
14	VfB Theley	27	13
15	Eisbachtaler Sportfreunde	15	14
16	FC Ensdorf	3	16

- Source: DSFS Liga-Chronik (in German), page: C4, accessed: 18 March 2009
- Bold teams are promoted to the 2nd Bundesliga.
- ^{1} SV Alsenborn was denied the 2nd Bundesliga licence.

== Re-creation of the Regionalliga ==
In 1994, the Regionalligas were reintroduced, this time as the third tier of German Football. The teams from the southwest were however integrated into the new Regionalliga West/Südwest with the clubs from Nordrhein-Westfalen. In 2000, when the number of Regionalligas was reduced from four to two, the south western clubs moved to the Regionalliga Süd. In 2008, with the introduction of the 3. Liga the southwestern clubs will again move, into the new Regionalliga West and again be with the teams from Nordrhein-Westfalen.

== Winners and runners-up of the Regionalliga Südwest ==
The winners and runners-up of the league were:

**Season**	**Winner**	**Runner-Up**
1963–64	**Borussia Neunkirchen**	FK Pirmasens
1964–65	1. FC Saarbrücken	VfR Wormatia Worms
1965–66	FK Pirmasens	1. FC Saarbrücken
1966–67	**Borussia Neunkirchen**	1. FC Saarbrücken
1967–68	SV Alsenborn	TuS Neuendorf
1968–69	SV Alsenborn	TuS Neuendorf
1969–70	SV Alsenborn	FK Pirmasens
1970–71	Borussia Neunkirchen	FK Pirmasens
1971–72	Borussia Neunkirchen	SV Röchling Völklingen
1972–73	FSV Mainz 05	SV Röchling Völklingen
1973–74	Borussia Neunkirchen	1. FC Saarbrücken

- **Bold** denotes team went on to gain promotion to the Bundesliga.
- The Borussia Neunkirchen holds the record for league wins in any of the five Regionalligas, having won Südwest five times.
- The 1. FC Saarbrücken is the only southwest team to have won the old (1965) and new (1996) Regionalliga.

== Placings in the Regionalliga Südwest 1963 to 1974 ==
The league placings from 1963 to 1974:

Club	64	65	66	67	68	69	70	71	72	73	74
Borussia Neunkirchen	**1**	**B**	**B**	**1**	**B**	5	4	**1**	**1**	5	**1**
1. FC Saarbrücken	**B**	**1**	2	2	5	3	6	4	12	13	2
FC 08 Homburg				11	10	9	14	8	9	7	3
SV Röchling Völklingen	13	14	8	9	7	12	13	10	2	2	4
FSV Mainz 05	4	11	3	4	4	13	12	7	4	**1**	5
VfR Wormatia Worms	3	2	5	13	12	8	11	12	7	4	6
Eintracht Bad Kreuznach											7
FK Pirmasens	2	7	**1**	6	3	4	2	2	6	3	8
ASV Landau	19						7	9	8	6	9
SV Alsenborn			9	8	**1**	**1**	**1**	5	3	8	10
Südwest Ludwigshafen ^{1}	9	5	11	7	6	7	3	3	10	9	11
TuS Neuendorf	11	6	4	14	2	2	8	6	5	11	12
VfB Theley								16		10	13
Eisbachtaler Sportfreunde										14	14
FV Speyer						11	5	14	11	12	15
FC Ensdorf											16
Eintracht Trier	5	3	13	5	8	10	10	11	13	15	
Phönix Bellheim	17	10	12	15					14	16	
VfR Frankenthal	15	12	7	12	13	15		13	15		
SpVgg Andernach									16		
SV Saar 05 Saarbrücken	6	4	6	10	9	6	9	15			
SpVgg Weisenau	14	9	10	3	11	14	15				
SC Friedrichsthal					14		16				
FC Landsweiler						16					
SC Ludwigshafen	10	8	14		15						
SSV Mülheim					16						
Germania Metternich		18		16							
BSC Oppau	16	13	15								
TSC Zweibrücken	18	15	16								
Sportfreunde Saarbrücken	8	16									
VfR Kaiserslautern	7	17									
Tura Ludwigshafen ^{1}	12										
SV Niederlahnstein	20										

Source:"Regionalliga Südwest". Das deutsche Fussball-Archiv.

=== Key ===
Symbol	Key
**B**	Bundesliga
Place	League
Blank	Played at a league level below this league

=== Notes ===
- ^{1} TuRa Ludwigshafen merged with Phönix Ludwigshafen in 1964 to form Südwest Ludwigshafen.

== Records ==
The league records:

Highest win	**11–0**	SV Alsenborn **11** – **0** Saar 05 Saarbrücken (20 December 1970): 1. FC Saarbrücken **11** – **0** BSC Oppau (14 November 1965)
Most goals in a game	**14**	SV Alsenborn **6** – **8** FC Homburg (19 November 1972)
Season with most goals	**1,386** (3,65 per game)	1963–64
Round with most goals	**45** (5,63 per game)	Round 16, 1972–73

== All-time table ==
The best and worst teams in the all-time table of the league from 1963 to 1974:

Pos.	Club	Seasons	M	W	D	L	GF	GA	P
1	FK Pirmasens	11	342	189	73	80	777	423	**451**
2	1. FSV Mainz 05	11	342	164	63	115	666	521	**391**
3	1. FC Saarbrücken	10	304	159	63	82	622	357	**381**
4-33	30 clubs								
34	FC Ensdorf	1	30	1	6	23	18	86	**8**
