= BFV Hassia Bingen =

- Full name: Binger Fußball-Vereinigung Hassia e.V.
- Founded: 1910
- Ground: Stadion am Hessenhaus
- Capacity: 5,000
- Chairman: Bernd Haber
- Manager: Dietmar Aßmann
- League: Oberliga Rheinland-Pfalz/Saar (V)
- 2017–18 (Verbandsliga Südwest): 2nd
Home colours	Away colours

The BFV Hassia Bingen is a German association football club from the city of Bingen am Rhein, Rhineland-Palatinate. It last played at the highest level of German football in 1952–53 and reached the third round of the German Cup twice.

== History ==
=== 1910–1945 ===
BFV Hassia (Hassia is the Latin name for Hesse) was formed in 1910, but football was first played in Bingen under the name of Hassia in 1908.

In 1926 the club played in the top division level of football in the region, when it earned promotion to the Bezirksliga Rheinhessen-Saar. It finished fifth in this league out of ten clubs in its first season there, after which the league was disbanded. The team become part of the new tier-one Bezirksliga Main-Hessen, where it was to play for the next three seasons, being relegated in 1930 after a last-place finish.

Hassia won promotion to the Bezirksliga for the 1933–34 season, but the Nazis seized power that year and scrapped the Bezirksliga, introducing a Gauliga system instead, which reduced the number of top leagues in Germany to 16, without expanding the number of clubs in each. Hassia was not admitted to the new Gauliga Südwest/Mainhessen at all, up to the dissolution of the Gauliga system in 1945.

=== 1945–1963 ===
In post-war Germany, Hassia was grouped in the northern division of the tier-one Oberliga Südwest for the 1945–46 season. At this level, the team lasted for only one season before dropping back to the second level.

Football in the South West region of Germany was split at this level into three divisions: Vorderpfalz, Westpfalz and Rheinhessen. The club played in the Rheinhessen division without coming close to promotion in the coming years. In 1951, Hassia became one of four teams from this league to gain entry to the newly created 2nd Oberliga Südwest, the new second division in the region.

In its first season there, the team finished third, with all teams on places one to four on equal points. This, however, was enough for Hassia to return to the Oberliga.

In its last first division season the club finished last with three points out of 30 games, without a win all season, scoring 32 goals and conceding 142 goals. The following 2nd Oberliga season went better and the team finished sixth. After a seventh place the following year, the club came last once more in 1955–56 and was relegated to the tier-three Amateurliga Südwest.

The club took out the championship in this league in 1957 and 1959. In 1957, the team failed in the promotion round, coming last out of four clubs, but in 1959 it won its group without losing a game and returned to the 2nd Oberliga. The later allowed Hassia to take part in the German amateur football championship, where it went out to FC Singen 04 in the semi-finals.

From 1959 to 1963, Hassia played as a mid-table side in the second division but its results were not good enough to qualify it for the new second-tier Regionalliga Südwest when the Fußball-Bundesliga was introduced in 1963 and the club made a permanent departure from the second level as well.

=== 1963–2006 ===
Hassia returned to the Amateurliga, a league it would belong to until 1968, finishing in mid-table. In 1967–68, the club suffered another relegation, now to the fourth tier. It took until 1974 to recover from this and return to the Amateurliga.

In 1974, Hassia also opened its new stadium, which had to be sold to the city of Bingen in 1986.

The team entered the first round of the German Cup for the first time in 1975, advancing to the third round, where it was knocked out by SV Röchling Völklingen.

In 1976–77, the club had one more excellent season, finishing second on equal points with champions Wormatia Worms. Qualified for the German amateur championship once more, it went out in the quarter-finals to BFC Preussen. Additionally, it also played in the national cup once more, advancing to the third round after victories over 1. FC Schweinfurt 05 and Sportfreunde Eisbachtal, where it lost 2–1 to SpVgg Bayreuth. The following year, another second place was enough to qualify Hassia for the new Oberliga Südwest. It also made an appearance in the German Cup, losing 1–0 to Stuttgarter Kickers.

The team became a fixture in this league, spending 23 of 28 possible seasons in it until 2006. Only from 1991 to 1994 and again from 2001 to 2003 did the side play in the tier below, now the Verbandsliga Südwest. Its best performance in this era was a fourth place in 1984 and 1996. The five seasons spend in the Verbandsliga in this time, the team always finished in the top-three. It also took part in the first round of the German Cup three more times. In 1981 it advanced to the second round after a victory over SpVgg Landshut; in 1983 and 1986 it was knocked out in the first.

On 2 October 1983 Hassia player Jürgen Wilhelm scored a goal for the club against FC Homburg that was voted as the Goal of the month by German television station ARD. This goal then went on to win the Goal of the year award.

=== 2006–present ===
After finishing second to last in 2005–06 in the Oberliga, with only the insolvent SV Weingarten below the club, the team was relegated to the Verbandsliga once more. Back in what was now the fifth division, Hassia struggled, unlike on previous occasions, coming ninth and eleventh in the next two seasons. The club, however, did not share the fate of many other former Oberliga greats who dropped down the league system and recovered. A league title in 2008–09 meant a return to the Oberliga once more for 2009–10.

The club lasted for only one season in the Oberliga before returning to the Verbandsliga where it played until 2013 when another relegation meant a drop to the Landesliga. A championship at this level in 2015 took the club back up to the Verbandsliga.

In 2018, the club achieved promotion to the Oberliga after a second-place finish in the Verbandsliga.

== Honours ==
The club's honours:

=== League ===
- Amateurliga Südwest (III)
  - Champions: 1957, 1959
- Verbandsliga Südwest (V-VI)
  - Champions: 2003, 2009
- Landesliga Südwest-Ost
  - Champions: 2015

=== Cup ===
- South West Cup
  - Winners: 1981, 1983

== Recent seasons ==
The recent season-by-season performance of the club:

Season	Division	Tier	Position
1999–2000	Oberliga Südwest	IV	13th
2000–01	Oberliga Südwest	IV	19th ↓
2001–02	Verbandsliga Südwest	V	3rd
2002–03	Verbandsliga Südwest	V	1st ↑
2003–04	Oberliga Südwest	IV	13th
2004–05	Oberliga Südwest	IV	9th
2005–06	Oberliga Südwest	IV	17th ↓
2006–07	Verbandsliga Südwest	V	8th
2007–08	Verbandsliga Südwest	V	11th
2008–09	Verbandsliga Südwest	VI	1st ↑
2009–10	Oberliga Südwest	V	18th ↓
2010–11	Verbandsliga Südwest	VI	11th
2011–12	Verbandsliga Südwest	VI	10th
2012–13	Verbandsliga Südwest	VI	15th ↓
2013–14	Landesliga Südwest	VII	12th
2014–15	Landesliga Südwest	VII	1st ↑
2015–16	Verbandsliga Südwest	VI	3rd
2016–17	Verbandsliga Südwest	VI	

- With the introduction of the Regionalligas in 1994 and the 3. Liga in 2008 as the new third tier, below the 2. Bundesliga, all leagues below dropped one tier. In 2012 the Oberliga Südwest was renamed Oberliga Rheinland-Pfalz/Saar.

↑ Promoted	↓ Relegated

== Other sports ==
The club also offers table tennis as a second sport. Its women's team played in the 2nd Bundesliga Süd in 2008–09, earning promotion to the Bundesliga.
