= ASV Landau =

- Full name: Allgemeine Sportverein Landau 1946 e. V.
- Founded: 26 April 1946
- Ground: Südpfalz-Stadion
- Capacity: 11,000
- Chairman: Hans-Peter Hertel
- League: None
- 2016–17: A-Klasse Südpfalz (IX), 14th
- Website: http://www.asvlandau.de/

ASV Landau is a German association football club from the town of Landau, Rhineland-Palatinate. The club's greatest success has been promotion to the tier one Oberliga Südwest in 1949 and 1953, spending three seasons at this level. After the introduction of the Bundesliga in 1963 ASV became part of the tier two Regionalliga Südwest where it played in 1963–64 and, again, from 1969 to 1974.

The club has also taken part in the DFB-Pokal, the German Cup, on two occasions, in 1974–75 and 1975–76.

Apart from football the club offers 20 other departments, among them basketball, tennis and badminton. The club has, in the past, been the sports club with the most members in Rhineland-Palatinate.

== History ==
ASV Landau was formed on 26 April 1946.

Landau played in the tier one Oberliga Südwest from 1949 to 1951. After a sixth-place finish in its first season there a thirteenth place the year after meant relegation for the club.

ASV became a founding member of the tier two 2. Oberliga Südwest, where it won a league championship in 1952–53. The latter moved the team back up to the Oberliga Südwest where it played for one more seasons but suffered immediate relegation. From 1954 to 1960 another six 2. Oberliga seasons followed before the club suffered another relegation, now to the tier three Amateurliga Südwest.

In the Amateurliga, a league title in 1963 took the club up to the new Regionalliga Südwest where it played for just a season before being relegated again. A second title in 1969 took the club back to the Regionalliga and, this time, the club was able to establish itself in this league, now playing as Gummi-Mayer Landau. Hans Mayer, owner of local tyre manufacturer Gummi Meyer, had sponsored the club previously but used the structure of the club, whereby the football department was virtually independent, to add his company name. The German Football Association objected but could not prevent this step. In the next five seasons the team finished in the upper half of the table each year but a ninth place in 1974 was not enough to qualify for the new 2. Bundesliga and ASV had to return to the Amateurliga once more.

The club took part in the DFB-Pokal in 1974–75 and 1975–76. In 1974–75 it advanced to the second round after defeating FV Lörrach 2–1 in the first and was knocked out by FC Augsburg. On the second occasions ASV lost 7–1 to Hannover 96 in the first round.

After 1978 the club, now as ASV Landau again, began to decline. It failed to qualify for the new tier three Oberliga Südwest and instead entered the Verbandsliga Südwest below from where it was relegated in 1979. It returned to the Verbandsliga in 1982 and finished runners-up in 1986 but then declined again and was once more relegated in 1991. It made a second return to the Verbandsliga in 1994 but this time lasted for only two seasons and dropped out of the Landesliga Südwest below in 1997 as well.

From there the club descended through the Bezirksliga Vorderpfalz to the lower amateur leagues but returned to the Landesliga by 2003. After seven seasons in the Landesliga the club was relegated in 2010 and descended to the tier nine A-Klasse Südpfalz, where it played until 2017, when the club dropped its football section out from league play following its declaration of insolvency.

== Honours ==
The club's honours:

- 2. Oberliga Südwest
  - Champions: 1952–53
- Amateurliga Südwest
  - Champions: 1962–63, 1968–69
- Bezirksliga Vorderpfalz
  - Champions: 2002–03
- South West Cup
  - Winners: 1974–75

== Recent seasons ==
The recent season-by-season performance of the club:

Season	Division	Tier	Position
2003–04	Landesliga Südwest-Ost	VI	12th
2004–05	Landesliga Südwest-Ost	VI	6th
2005–06	Landesliga Südwest-Ost	VI	9th
2006–07	Landesliga Südwest-Ost	VI	5th
2007–08	Landesliga Südwest-Ost	VI	5th
2008–09	Landesliga Südwest-Ost	VII	12th
2009–10	Landesliga Südwest-Ost	VII	16th ↓
2010–11	Bezirksliga Vorderpfalz	VIII	16th ↓
2011–12	Bezirksklasse Süd	IX	3rd
2012–13	Bezirksklasse Süd	IX	4th
2013–14	A-Klasse Südpfalz	IX	7th
2014–15	A-Klasse Südpfalz	IX	12th
2015–16	A-Klasse Südpfalz	IX	12th
2016–17	A-Klasse Südpfalz	IX	14th ↓
2017–18	Inactive		

- With the introduction of the Regionalligas in 1994 and the 3. Liga in 2008 as the new third tier, below the 2. Bundesliga, all leagues below dropped one tier.

↑ Promoted	↓ Relegated

== Stadium ==
The club plays its home games in the Südpfalz-Stadion which holds 11,000 and was built in 1926. The spectator record for the stadium was established in April 1950 when 12,000 saw ASV's home game against 1. FC Kaiserslautern.
