= VfR Baumholder =

German football club

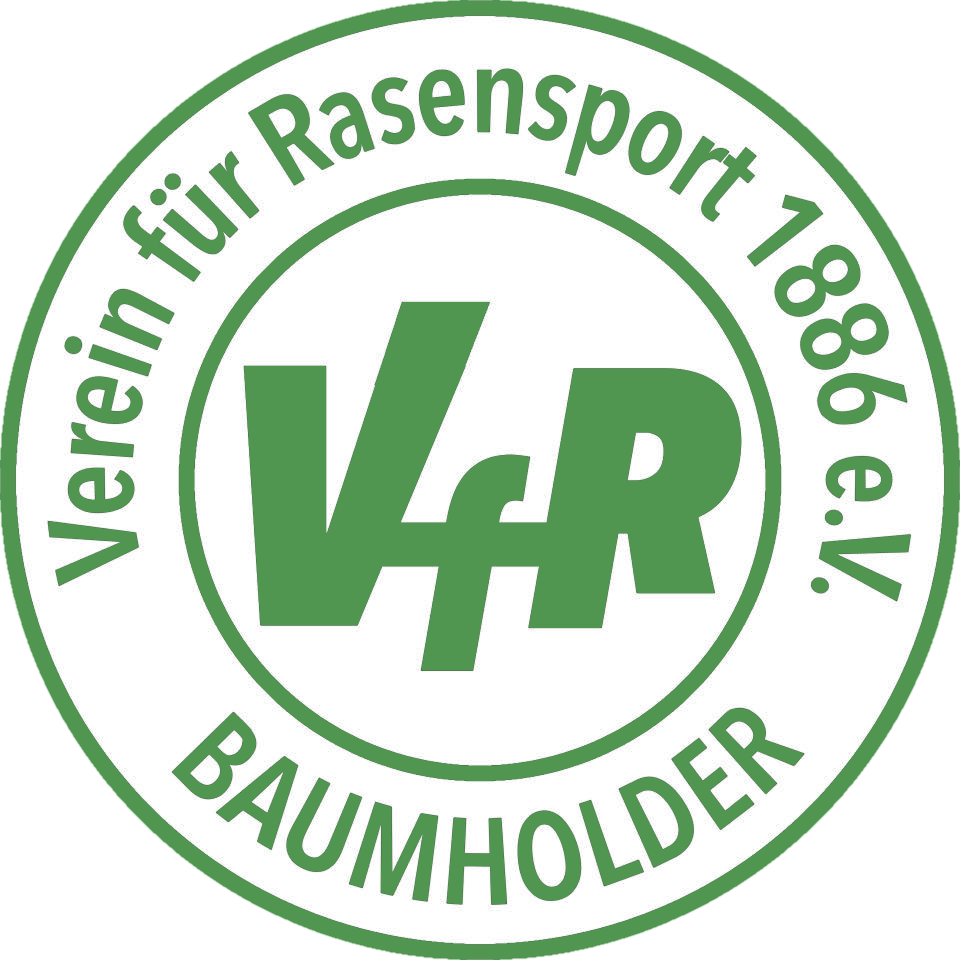
- Full name: Verein für Rasensport Baumholder e.V.
- Founded: 1921
- Ground: Brülstadion
- League: LandesligaWest (VII)
- 2015–16: 8th
Home colours	Away colours

VfR Baumholder is a German association football club from the town of Baumholder, Rhineland-Palatinate. The team played as a second and third division side through most of the 1950s, 1960s, and on into the early 1970s.

== History ==
The club was established sometime in 1921 as Verein für Rasensport Baumholder and in 1937 merged with Turnverein 1886 Baumholder and Athletenverein Baumholder to form Verein für Leibesübungen Baumholder. The club was renamed VfR in 1946.

VfR first appeared in the second division Amateurliga Rheinhessen/Nahe in the 1951–52 season. From 1955 to 1963 they were part of the Amateurliga Südwest (II) where their best result was a second-place finish in 1959.

The club was relegated in 1961, but quickly made its way back to Amateurliga play which had become a third division circuit after the formation of the Bundesliga (I) in 1963. The club currently plays in Landesliga West (VII) after promotion from the Bezirksliga Nahe (VIII) in 2014.
