= SV Südwest Ludwigshafen =

German football club

- Full name: Sportverein Südwest 1882 Ludwigshafen
- Founded: 29 May 1964
- Capacity: 12,000
- League: Bezirksliga Vorderpfalz (VIII)
- 2015–16: 9th
Home colours	Away colours

SV Südwest Ludwigshafen is a German association football club from the city of Ludwigshafen am Rhein, Rhineland-Palatinate. The club was formed on 29 May 1964 out of the merger of the traditional sides Sportverein 03 Ludwigshafen and Phoenix Tura 1882. They currently play in the level six division Verbandsliga Südwest.

== History ==
=== SV Phönix 03 Ludwigshafen ===
Fußball-Club Phönix Ludwigshafen was established in July 1904 and played in the Westkreis-Liga of the regional Süddeutschland league in the years leading up to World War I. The war significantly reduced play in many parts of the country and the situation did not improve until after the conflict had concluded. In 1921, Phönix beat 1. FC Pforzheim in a semi-final contest (1–0) before losing 1:2 to 1. FC Nürnberg in the league final. The club earned another second-place result in senior level regional play in 1923 in the Kreisliga Pfalz before entering the new Bezirksliga Rhein, where it continued to archive good results. From 1927, it was part of the Bezirksliga Rheinhessen-Saar and remained a top-of-the-table side.

Following the reorganization of German football under the Third Reich in 1933, FC became part of the Gauliga Südwest, one of 16 new regional top-flight divisions. They captured the title there in 1935 and took part in qualification play for the national championship. The following season they crashed to a 10th-place finish and were relegated.

In 1936, Phönix was joined with a group of other local clubs (FC Pfalz Ludwigshafen, Stemm- und Ringclub Ludwigshafen, Turn- und Fechtclub Ludwigshafen, Turnverein 1861 Ludwigshafen, and Kanu-Club Ludwigshafen) to play as Turn- und Sport-Gemeinschaft 1861 Ludwigshafen.

TSG won its way into the Gauliga in 1938, but as World War II made conditions more difficult, play became more local in character and the team played in the Gauliga Südwest/Saarpfalz (1939–41) and the Gauliga Westmark (1941–43). The following season, TSG became part of the wartime side Kriegsspielgemeinschaft Ludwigshafen alongside TSG Oppau and Verein für Leibesübungen Friesenheim, completing one more campaign before the division collapsed as war overtook the area.

The club was re-established following the conflict as Sportverein Phönix 1903 Ludwigshafen and played in the first division Oberliga Südwest from 1945 until 1962 as a mid-table side. They won the 2. Liga-Südwest in 1963, the same year that the new first division Bundesliga was formed. Their title earned the club a place in the new Regionalliga Südwest (II) where they played a single season before the merger that formed the current day club.

=== Tura 1882 Ludwigshafen ===
The Tura 1882 Ludwigshafen was itself the result of a merger. His predecessors were the Ludwigshafen FG 03, as the FC Palatinate 1909 who belonged to the Kreisliga West from 1914. After the formation of the Bezirksliga Rhein, the FG played three seasons in this league before entering the Bezirksliga Rhein-Saar in 1927. A fourth place in 1928 was its best result there.

The club, now as Tura Ludwigshafen, won promotion to the Gauliga in 1941, belonging to this league until the end of the war.

In 1950, the club returned to first division football, earning promotion to the Oberliga Südwest and remained a mid-table side in this league until 1963, with the exception of 1956–57.

=== Südwest Ludwigshafen ===
The new club continued to play in the Regionalliga Südwest after the merger in 1964 but remained an undistinctive side. Only in 1970 and 1971 did it come close to taking part in the Promotion round to the Fußball-Bundesliga when it earned third-place finishes. In 1974, when the Regionalligas were disbanded in favour of the new 2. Bundesligas, Südwest's eleventh-place finish meant it did not qualify for the new league. Instead, it had to enter the tier-three Amateurliga Südwest. In 1978, when the new Oberliga Südwest (III) replaced the three Amateurligas in the region, the club qualified for the league. The club pulled off a surprise in the 1978–79 edition of the German Cup when it defeated the 1. FC Kaiserslautern 2–1 in the third round.

It initially earned good results, finishing second in 1981 but then declined. From 1988, it had another good spell and finished runners-up once more in 1992. In 1994, when the Regionalliga West/Südwest was formed, Südwest did not qualify and two years later was relegated to the Verbandsliga Südwest (V) instead. After five seasons there, the club suffered another relegation in 2001 but recovered immediately and returned to the Verbandsliga where it played until 2013–14. Coming 14th in the league that season the club was relegated to the Landesliga. The following season it finished 15th in the Landesliga and was relegated once more, now to the Bezirksliga.

== Honours ==
=== Phönix Ludwigshafen ===
- Southern German championship
  - Runners-up: 1921, 1923
- Kreisliga Pfalz (I)
  - Champions: 1921, 1922, 1923
- Gauliga Südwest/Mainhessen (I)
  - Champions: 1935
- 2. Oberliga Südwest (II)
  - Champions: 1963

=== Ludwigshafener FC Pfalz ===
- Southern German championship
  - Runners-up: 1916, 1920
- Westkreis-Liga (I)
  - Champions: 1908, 1916, 1917
- Kreisliga Pfalz (I)
  - Champions: 1920

=== Tura Ludwigshafen ===
- 2. Oberliga Südwest (II)
  - Champions: 1957

=== Südwest ===
- South West Cup (Tiers III-VII)
  - Winners: 1984, 1987, 1990

== Logo history ==
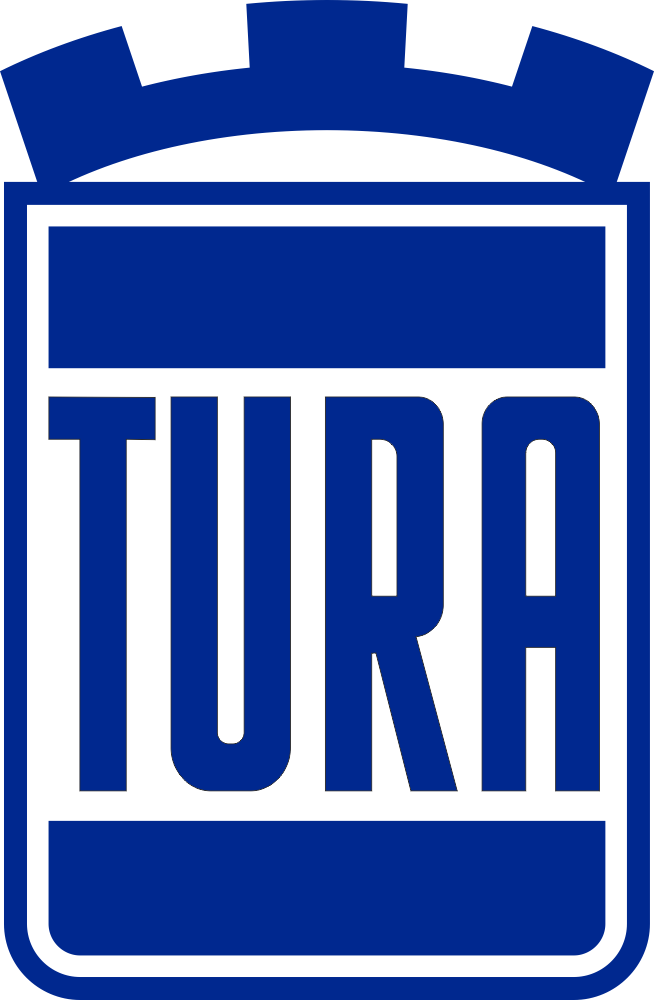
Logo TuRa Ludwigshafen

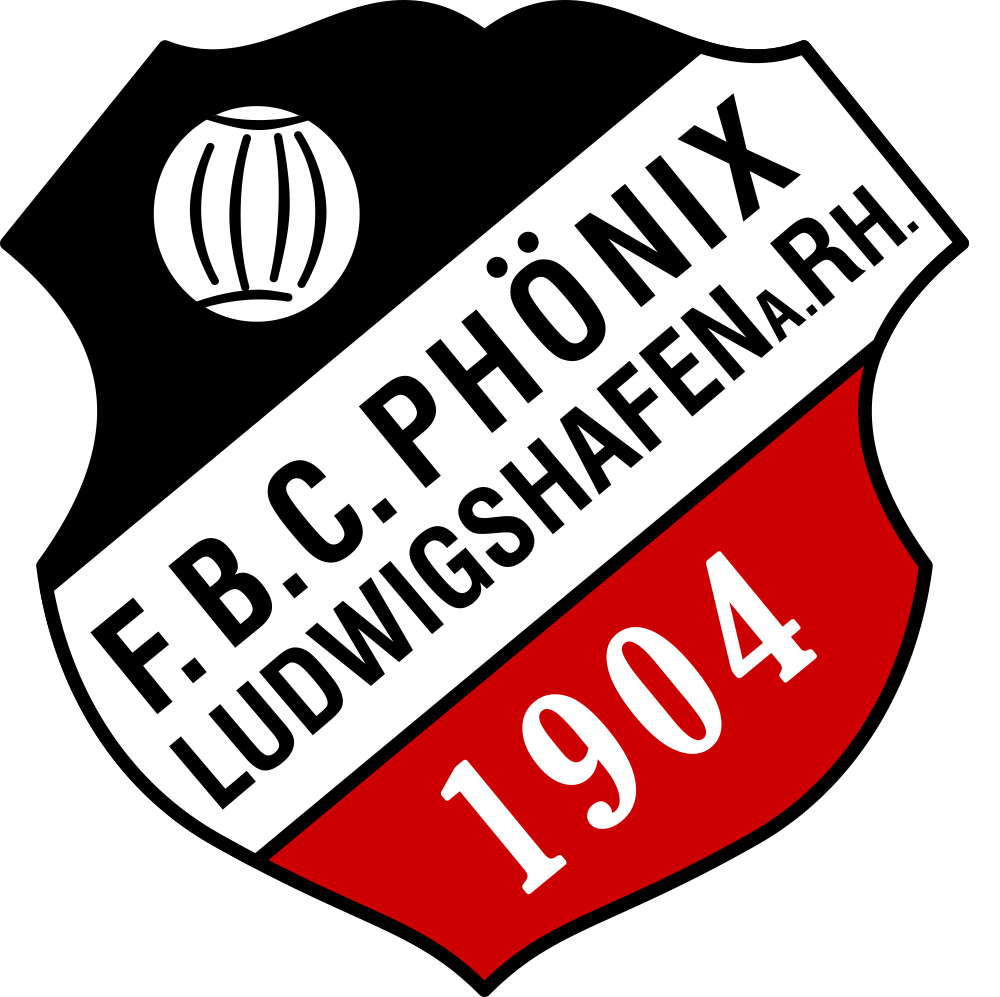
Logo FC Phönix Ludwigshafen 1904 - 1937

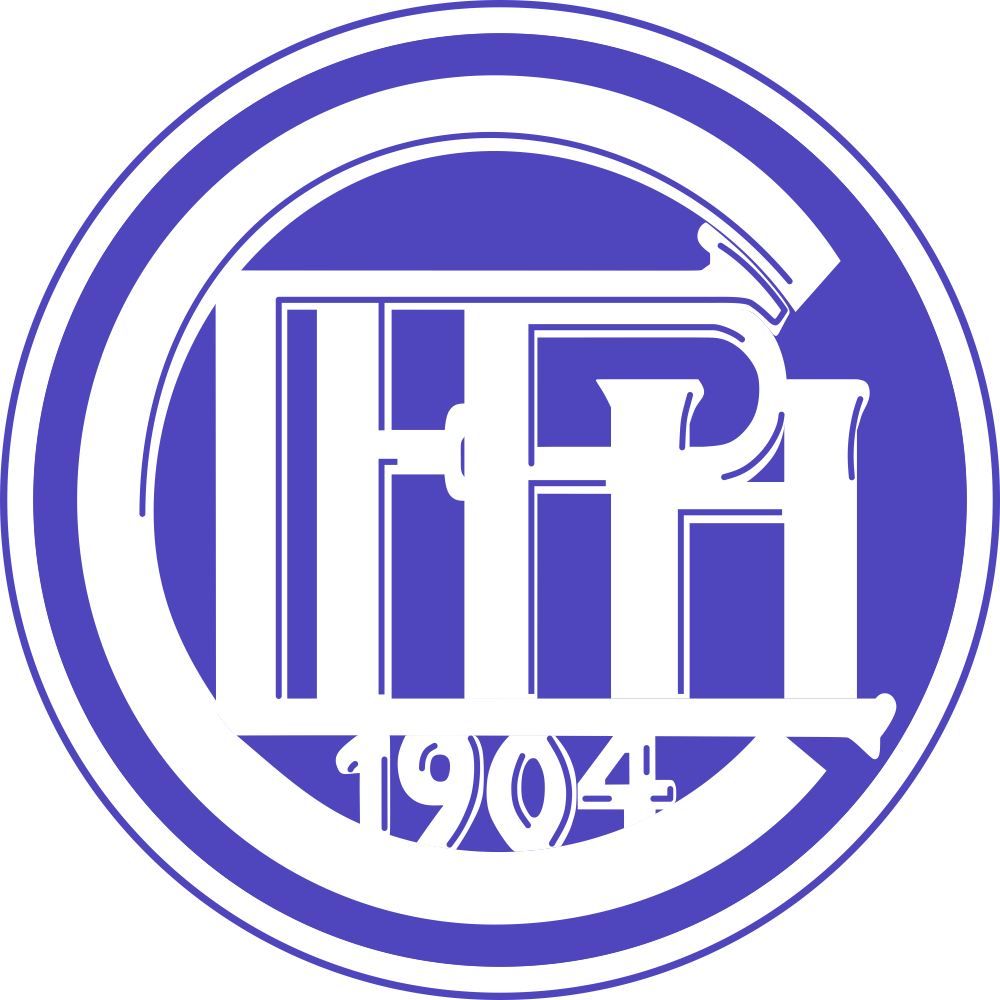
Logo FC Phönix Ludwigshafen 1931

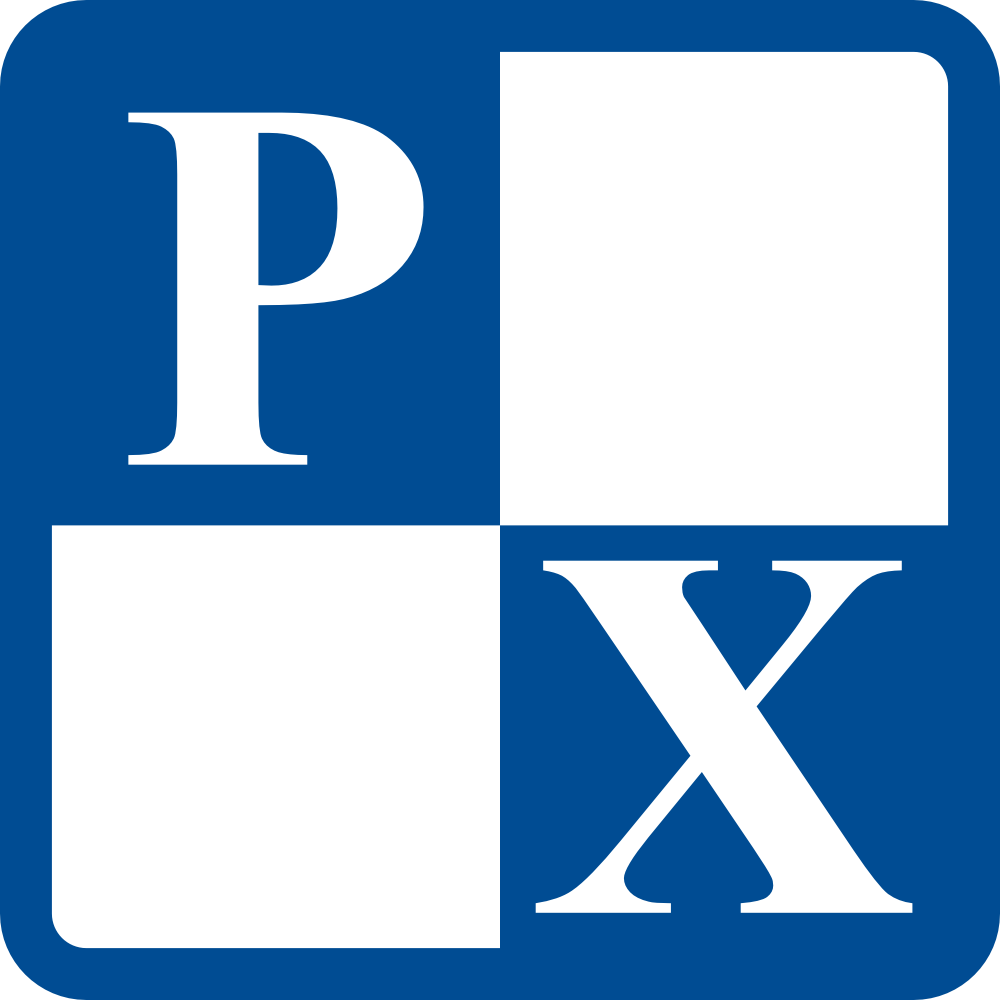
Logo FC Phönix Ludwigshafen
