= Eintracht Bad Kreuznach =

German football club

SG Eintracht Bad Kreuznach
- Full name: Sportgemeinde Eintracht e.V. 1902 Bad Kreuznach
- Nickname: Gässjer
- Founded: 1902
- Ground: Friedrich Moebus Stadium
- Capacity: 10,000
- Chairman: Bert Haag
- Manager: Steffen Seidel
- League: Verbandsliga Südwest (VI)
- 2023-24: Verbandsliga Südwest (VI), 7th
Home colours	Away colours

Eintracht Bad Kreuznach is a German association football club from city of Bad Kreuznach, Rhineland-Palatinate. They are among the most successful amateur football teams in southwestern Germany but, after a couple of consecutive relegations, now find themselves in the tier eight Bezirksliga Nahe.

== History ==
In 2000, the club advanced to the Oberliga Südwest (IV) where they played until being sent down to the Verbandsliga Südwest (V) after a 17th place Oberliga result in 2008. What followed was two more relegations and an insolvency in 2011, caused by a debt of Euro 110,000, which took the club to the eighth tier, Bezirksliga Nahe.

== Recent seasons ==
The recent season-by-season performance of the club:

Season	Division	Tier	Position
1999–2000	Verbandsliga Südwest	V	1st ↑
2000–01	Oberliga Südwest	IV	11th
2001–02	Oberliga Südwest	IV	16th
2002–03	Oberliga Südwest	IV	10th
2003–04	Oberliga Südwest	IV	6th
2004–05	Oberliga Südwest	IV	7th
2005–06	Oberliga Südwest	IV	7th
2006–07	Oberliga Südwest	IV	13th
2007–08	Oberliga Südwest	IV	17th ↓
2008–09	Verbandsliga Südwest	VI	16th
2009–10	Verbandsliga Südwest	VI	16th ↓
2010–11	Landesliga Südwest-Ost	VII	16th ↓
2011–12	Bezirksliga Nahe	VIII	1st ↑
2012–13	Landesliga Südwest-West	VII	14th ↓
2013–14	Bezirksliga Nahe	VIII	3rd
2014–15	Bezirksliga Nahe	VIII	1st ↑
2015–16	Landesliga Südwest-West	VII	2nd ↑
2016–17	Verbandsliga Südwest	VI	11th
2017–18	Verbandsliga Südwest	VI	6th
2018–19	Verbandsliga Südwest	VI	9th
2019-20	Verbandsliga Südwest	VI	12th
2020-21	Verbandsliga Südwest-Gruppe 1	VI	8th
2021-22	Verbandsliga Südwest-Gruppe 1	VI	6th ↓
2022-23	Landesliga Südwest-West	VII	1st ↑
2023-24	Verbandsliga Südwest	VI	7th
2024-25	Verbandsliga Südwest	VI	

- With the introduction of the Regionalligas in 1994 and the 3. Liga in 2008 as the new third tier, below the 2. Bundesliga, all leagues below dropped one tier.

↑ Promoted	↓ Relegated
