= FC Phönix Bellheim =

- Full name: Fußball-Club Phönix 1921 e.V. Bellheim
- Founded: 1921
- Ground: Franz-Hage-Stadion
- Capacity: 11,000
- League: A-Klasse Südpfalz (IX)
- 2015–16: 4th
| Home colours | Away colours |

FC Phönix Bellheim is a German association football club from the city of Bellheim, Rhineland-Palatinate. Established on 11 February 1921 the club did not come to note until after World War II when they were part of the Amateurliga Vorderplatz (III) from 1947 to 1952 and the Amateurliga Südwest (III) from 1952 to 1962. Phönix took part in play for the German national amateur title in 1962 and 1969, advancing as far as the semifinals in their first appearance before being put out 0:1 by eventual champions SC Tegel.

== History ==
Following the 1963 formation of the Bundesliga, Germany's professional first division, Bellheim became part of the Regionalliga Südwest (II) where they earned lower table results until finally being relegated in 1967.

After four seasons in the Amateurliga Südwest they won the division title in 1971 and had a successful promotion playoff to win their way back to the Regionalliga. They fared poorly there and were sent down after a 16th-place result in 1973. Their descent continued following a 13th-place finish in Amateurliga play. Between 1985 and 1992 the team was part of the Verbandsliga Südwest (V) and, for a while competed in the Bezirksklasse Vorderpfalz/Süd (IX) before dropping to the B-Klasse Südpfalz in 2013.

A championship at this level allowed the club promotion back up to the ninth tier in 2014, now renamed A-Klasse Südpfalz.

== Honours ==
- Amateurliga Südwest (III)
  - Champions: 1971
- B-Klasse Südpfalz (X)
  - Champions: 2014

== Recent seasons ==
The recent season-by-season performance of the club:

| Season | Division | Tier | Position |
|---|---|---|---|
| 2004–05 | Bezirksklasse Süd | VIII | 14th |
| 2005–06 | Bezirksklasse Süd | VIII | 8th |
| 2006–07 | Bezirksklasse Süd | VIII | 13th |
| 2007–08 | | | |
| 2008–09 | Bezirksklasse Süd | IX | 6th |
| 2009–10 | Bezirksklasse Süd | IX | 2nd |
| 2010–11 | Bezirksklasse Süd | IX | 4th |
| 2011–12 | Bezirksklasse Süd | IX | 6th |
| 2012–13 | A-Klasse Südpfalz | IX | 16th ↓ |
| 2013–14 | B-Klasse Südpfalz-Ost | X | 1st ↑ |
| 2014–15 | A-Klasse Südpfalz | IX | 3rd |
| 2015–16 | A-Klasse Südpfalz | IX | 4th |
| 2016–17 | A-Klasse Südpfalz | IX | |

- With the introduction of the Regionalligas in 1994 and the 3. Liga in 2008 as the new third tier, below the 2. Bundesliga, all leagues below dropped one tier.

=== Key ===
| ↑ Promoted | ↓ Relegated |
