= Joel Silva =

Joel Silva may refer to:

- Joel Silva (volleyball) (born 1985), Venezuelan volleyball player
- Joel Silva (footballer, born 1989), Paraguayan football goalkeeper
- Joel Silva (footballer, born 1990), Portuguese football forward for Sanjoanense
- Joel Silva (footballer, born 2003), Portuguese football midfielder for Boavista
- Joel da Silva Kiala (born 2004), Angolan football centre-back for Eintracht Frankfurt II
