= Internationaler Saarlandpokal =

- Organiser(s): 1. FC Saarbrücken
- Founded: 1949; 77 years ago
- Abolished: 1951; 75 years ago
- Region: Saarland
- Teams: 15 (first edition); 23 (last edition)
- Last champions: (Saar Protectorate) 1. FC Saarbrücken (1 title)
- Most championships: (Saar Protectorate) 1. FC Saarbrücken (1 title)

The Internationaler Saarlandpokal was a football competition organised by 1. FC Saarbrücken, after the club were denied in their application to regularly compete in France's Ligue 2. The competition is regarded as a forerunner to the European Cup.

== Background ==
Saarland had initially become independent following the fall of Napoleon, before being incorporated in Germany in January 1871, following the unification of Germany. Founded in 1903, 1. FC Saarbrücken finished runners up in the 1943 German football championship, losing 3–0 in the final against Dresdner SC. After German defeat in World War II, the region was administered by the French Fourth Republic as the Saar Protectorate. The Saarland national football team was soon formed, playing their first game on 22 November 1950, beating Switzerland 4–2 in Saarbrücken.

Following the creation of the Saar Protectorate, FC Saarbrücken competed in the 1948–49 French Division 2, winning the championship under the Francised name of FC Sarrebruck, beating Valenciennes 9–0 and Rouen 10–1 on the way to the title. Saarbrücken applied to join the French Football Federation at the insistence of FIFA president Jules Rimet. Saarbrücken's application was resoundly rejected by French clubs, particularly those in Alsace and Lorraine who had been forced to play in the German Gauliga Elsaß following the German occupation of France from 1940 to 1944. Saarbrücken's results were consequently discounted and RC Lens won the championship.

With the Saar's Ehrenliga deemed too weak for a club of Saarbrücken's stature, the club organised the Internationaler Saarlandpokal between 15 European clubs with a prize fund of two million Saar francs being awarded to the winners of the tournament.

== 1949–50 edition ==
The tournament began on 18 September 1949 with FC Saarbrücken defeating Swiss club FC La Chaux-de-Fonds 7–0. Saarbrücken played every game at their Stadion Kieselhumes home, with the three clubs with the best results against Saarbrücken joining the hosts in the semi-finals.

=== Qualifying round ===
18 September 1949	(Saar Protectorate) 1. FC Saarbrücken	7–0	(Switzerland) FC La Chaux-de-Fonds	Saarbrücken, Saar
		RSSSF		Stadium: Stadion Kieselhumes

2 October 1949	(Saar Protectorate) 1. FC Saarbrücken	2–0	(Belgium) Standard Liège	Saarbrücken, Saar
		RSSSF		Stadium: Stadion Kieselhumes

30 October 1949	(Saar Protectorate) 1. FC Saarbrücken	0–2	(France) Stade Rennais	Saarbrücken, Saar
		RSSSF		Stadium: Stadion Kieselhumes

16 November 1949	(Saar Protectorate) 1. FC Saarbrücken	3–0	(Sweden) IF Elfsborg	Saarbrücken, Saar
		RSSSF		Stadium: Stadion Kieselhumes

11 December 1949	(Saar Protectorate) 1. FC Saarbrücken	2–0	(Denmark) Køge BK	Saarbrücken, Saar
		RSSSF		Stadium: Stadion Kieselhumes

26 December 1949	(Saar Protectorate) 1. FC Saarbrücken	0–4	(Socialist Federal Republic of Yugoslavia) Hajduk Split	Saarbrücken, Saar
		RSSSF		Stadium: Stadion Kieselhumes

1 January 1950	(Saar Protectorate) 1. FC Saarbrücken	4–1	Austria Wien	Saarbrücken, Saar
		RSSSF		Stadium: Stadion Kieselhumes

5 February 1950	(Saar Protectorate) 1. FC Saarbrücken	4–2	(France) Nancy	Saarbrücken, Saar
		RSSSF		Stadium: Stadion Kieselhumes

5 March 1950	(Saar Protectorate) 1. FC Saarbrücken	1–0	(Switzerland) Bellinzona	Saarbrücken, Saar
		RSSSF		Stadium: Stadion Kieselhumes

25 March 1950	(Saar Protectorate) 1. FC Saarbrücken	3–1	(Sweden) Degerfors IF	Saarbrücken, Saar
		RSSSF		Stadium: Stadion Kieselhumes

25 April 1950	(Saar Protectorate) 1. FC Saarbrücken	3–3	(Austria) Rapid Wien	Saarbrücken, Saar
		RSSSF		Stadium: Stadion Kieselhumes

1 May 1950	(Saar Protectorate) 1. FC Saarbrücken	5–0	(France) FC Sète	Saarbrücken, Saar
		RSSSF		Stadium: Stadion Kieselhumes

13 May 1950	(Saar Protectorate) 1. FC Saarbrücken	5–0	(France) Toulouse	Saarbrücken, Saar
		RSSSF		Stadium: Stadion Kieselhumes

18 May 1950	(Saar Protectorate) 1. FC Saarbrücken	0–3	(France) Metz	Saarbrücken, Saar
		RSSSF		Stadium: Stadion Kieselhumes

=== Semi-finals ===
10 June 1950	(Saar Protectorate) 1. FC Saarbrücken	1–0	(Socialist Federal Republic of Yugoslavia) Hajduk Split	Saarbrücken, Saar
		RSSSF		Stadium: Stadion Kieselhumes

10 June 1950	(France) Stade Rennais	3–2	(France) Metz	Saarbrücken, Saar
		RSSSF		Stadium: Stadion Kieselhumes

=== Third place play-off ===
11 June 1950	(Socialist Federal Republic of Yugoslavia) Hajduk Split	3–2	(France) Metz	Saarbrücken, Saar
		RSSSF		Stadium: Stadion Kieselhumes

=== Final ===
11 June 1950	(Saar Protectorate) 1. FC Saarbrücken	4–0	(France) Stade Rennais	Saarbrücken, Saar
		RSSSF		Stadium: Stadion Kieselhumes

== 1950–51 edition ==
The following season, the tournament was hosted by both FC Saarbrücken and fellow Saarlanders Borussia Neunkirchen at their Ellenfeldstadion ground with games played on a home and away basis. For the 1950–51 edition, German clubs were invited for the first time, as well as five new entries from Europe. The tournament was never completed due to a lack of interest and sponsorship after it was agreed that Saarlander clubs would return to the German football system in time for the 1951–52 Oberliga.

=== List of teams ===
- (Saar Protectorate) FC Saarbrücken
- (Saar Protectorate) Borussia Neunkirchen
- (Austria) Admira Wien
- Austria Wien
- (Belgium) OC Charleroi
- (France) Metz
- (France) Red Star
- (France) Rouen
- (Germany) 1860 Munich
- (Germany) Eintracht Frankfurt
- (Germany) Eintracht Trier
- (Germany) Kaiserslautern
- (Germany) Mainz 05
- (Germany) Nürnberg
- (Germany) Phönix Lübeck
- (Germany) Pirmasens
- (Germany) Schwaben Augsburg
- (Germany) St. Pauli
- (Germany) Tennis Borussia Berlin
- (Germany) TuS Neuendorf
- (Germany) VfB Mühlburg
- (Germany) VfL Neustadt
- (Socialist Federal Republic of Yugoslavia) Partizan

== Legacy ==
The Internationaler Saarlandpokal gave FC Saarbrücken new found exposure and the club played Switzerland, Liverpool, Universidad Católica, Real Madrid, Athletic Bilbao and Newell's Old Boys in the months following the formation of the competition. The competition is regarded as a forerunner to the European Cup, with Saarbrücken representing the Saar in the 1955–56 European Cup, despite playing in the German league system at the time. Saarbrücken won their first game in UEFA's inaugural European competition, beating A.C. Milan 4–3 at the San Siro, before losing the second leg and exiting the competition on aggregate.
