= Peter Schubert =

Peter Schubert may refer to:

- Peter Schubert (diplomat) (1938–2003), German Albanologist and diplomat
- Peter Schubert (musicologist) (born 19??), US musicologist
- Peter Schubert (football manager) (born 1966), German football coach
