= 1. FC Saarbrücken =

German association football club based in the city of Saarbrücken, Saarland

- Full name: 1. Fußball-Club Saarbrücken e. V.
- Nicknames: De FC; Die Molschder
- Short name: FCS
- Founded: 18 April 1903; 123 years ago
- Ground: Ludwigsparkstadion
- Capacity: 16,003
- President: Hartmut Ostermann
- Manager: Argirios Giannikis
- League: 3. Liga
- 2025–26: 3. Liga, 15th of 20
- Website: https://www.fc-saarbruecken.de/
Home colours	Away colours	Third colours

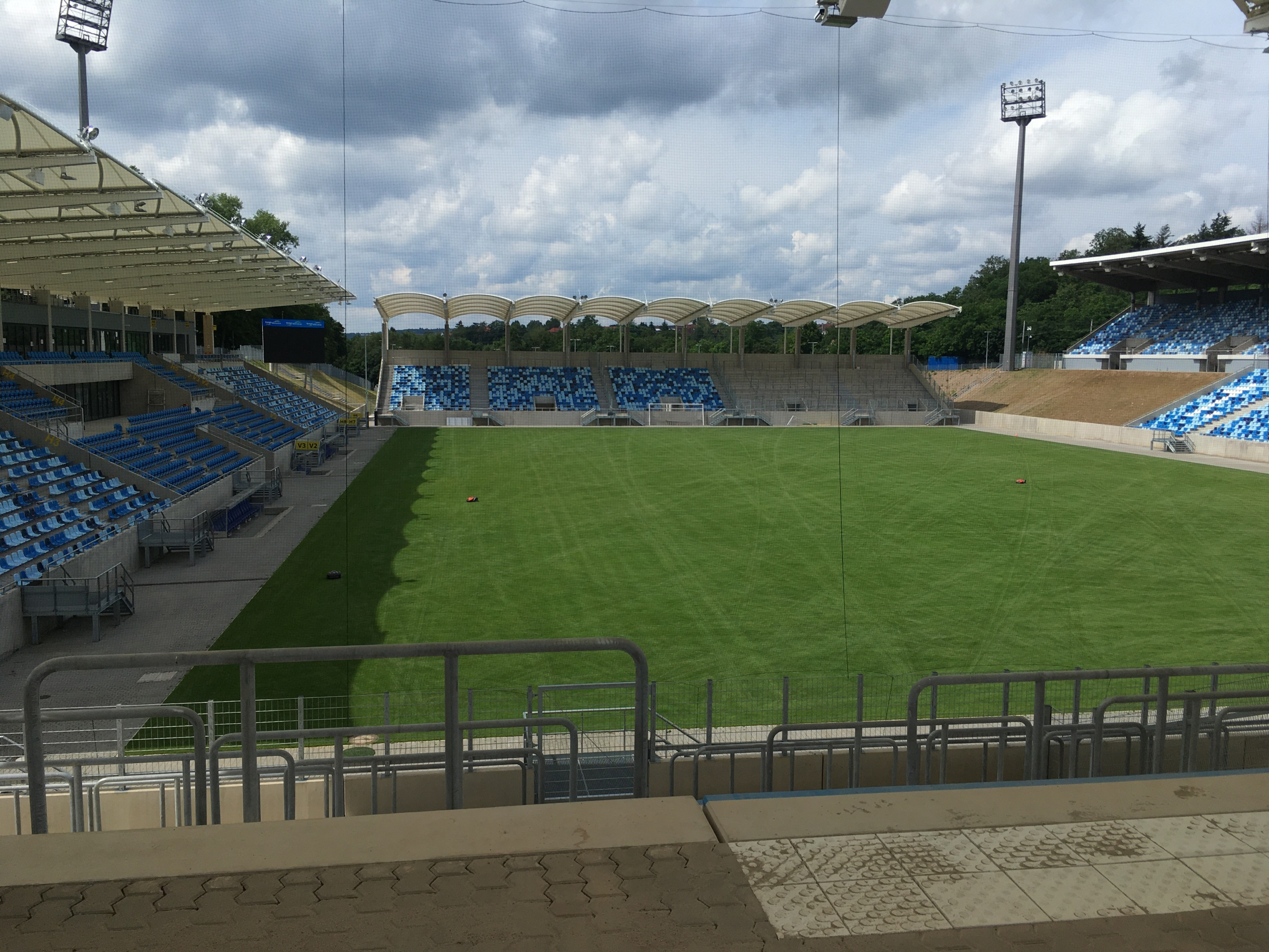
Ludwigsparkstadion, home venue of 1. FC Saarbrücken

1. Fußball-Club Saarbrücken (German: 1. Fußball-Club Saarbrücken e. V.) is a German football club based in Saarbrücken, Saarland. The club plays in the 3. Liga, which is the third tier of football in Germany.

== History ==
The club began its existence as the football department of Turnverein Malstatt formed in 1903. That department split off in 1907 to form the independent football club FV Malstatt-Burbach and on 1 April 1909 was renamed FV Saarbrücken.

The club became part of the tier-one Kreisliga Saar in 1919 where it played with moderate success. A second-place finish in the league's last season in 1922–23 was their best result. From 1923, the club played in the Bezirksliga Rhein-Saar – Saar division, winning the title in 1927–28 but later missing out on qualification to the new national first division Gauliga in 1933.

=== Nazi era (1933–1945) ===
The team did make its way to first division play in 1935 in the Gauliga Südwest, one of sixteen regional divisions established in the re-organization of German football in the Nazi era. A league shuffle saw them in the Gauliga Südwest-Saarpfalz in 1940 and they won the division the next year. In 1943, they again won their division – now called the Gauliga Westmark – and advanced through the playoff rounds to the national final where they were defeated 0–3 by Dresdner SC. The next year, they only made it as far as the quarterfinals where they were put out by 1. FC Nürnberg. During the latter years of World War II from 1943 to 1945, the club played as part of the combined wartime side Kriegsspielgemeinschaft Saarbrücken with SC Altenkessel.

=== Post war and French exile ===
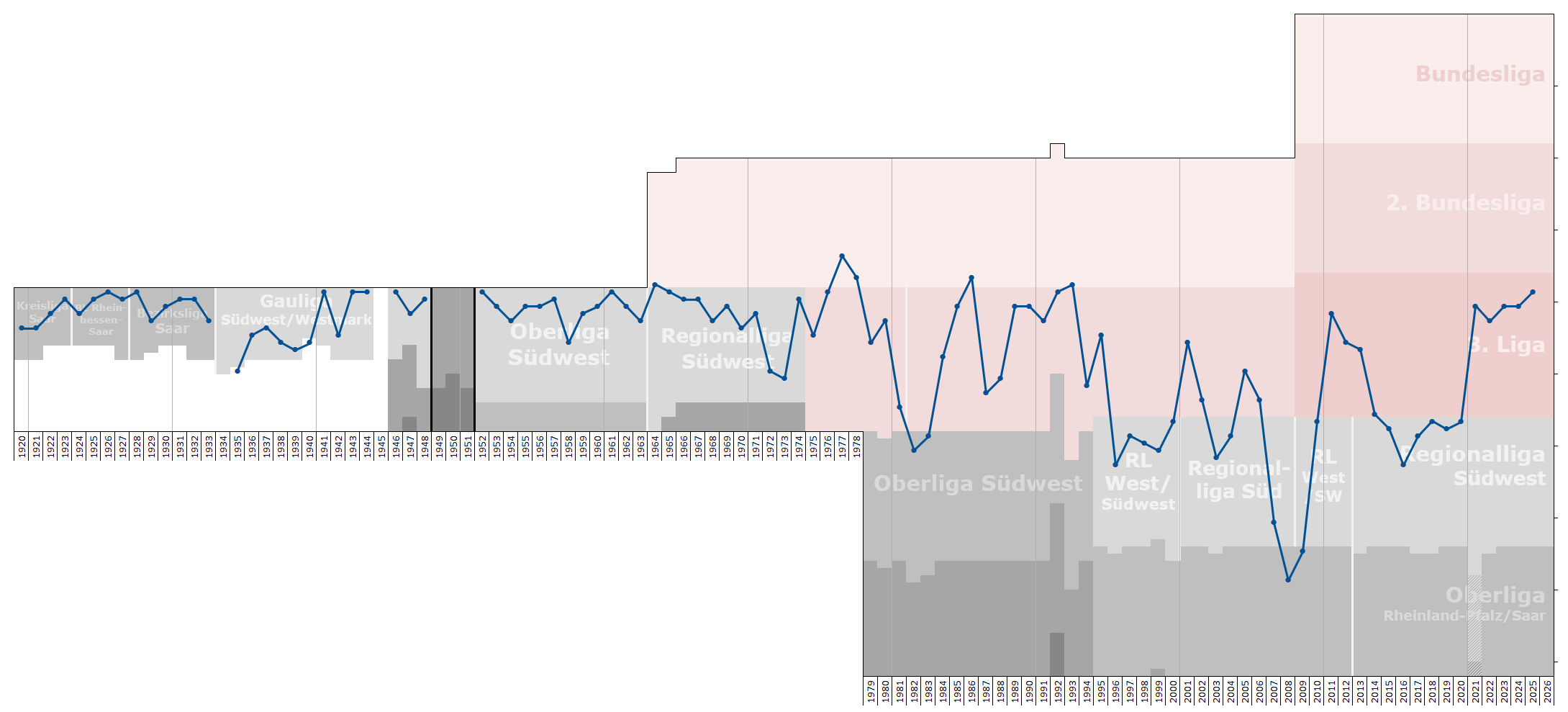
Historical chart of Saarbrücken league performance

After the war, the occupying Allied authorities dissolved most organizations within Germany, including sports and football clubs, as part of the process of de-Nazification. The team was allowed to reform late in 1945, but under the new name 1. FC Saarbrücken. The club played its first three seasons of post-war football in the first division Oberliga Südwest-Nord, winning the division championship in 1946.

The German state of Saarland, where the city of Saarbrücken is located, was occupied by the French after the war. They made various efforts to see the state become independent of Germany or join France. In sport, this was manifested as separate 1952 Olympic and 1954 FIFA World Cup teams for Saarland and the establishment of a short-lived football league for the state called the Ehrenliga. In 1948, 1. FC Saarbrücken was one of a number of sides forced out of German football, but unlike other clubs, they did not play in the puppet league. Instead, the strong side became part of the French second division in the 1948–49 edition as FC Sarrebruck. They won the division but were refused promotion or further participation, mainly due to the resistance of other clubs, among them Strasbourg, which had been forced to play in German competition during World War II.

Saarbrücken withdrew from the league and began to play in a series of friendlies over the next two years. They organized a tournament in 1949–50 called the Internationaler Saarlandpokal ("International Saarland Cup") that had them play 15 home matches against teams from Austria, Denmark, France, Sweden, Switzerland and Yugoslavia. The top three sides then joined hosts Saarbrücken in a playoff round, which the home team eventually won in a 4–0 victory over Stade Rennais UC of France. The next year, fellow Saarlanders VfB Neunkirchen co-hosted the tournament which this time included more German sides. The tournament was abandoned for 1952 as an agreement was reached to allow teams from the Saarland re-admission to the German Football Association (DFB).

This episode in the history of German football would play itself out with the odd appearance of a separate side from Saarland in the 1954 World Cup preliminary rounds. Without a proper home in either the German or French leagues, Saarland had established a separate football association with membership in FIFA. 1. FC Saarbrücken sent ten players to that national side and the Saarlanders acquitted themselves well, finishing second in their group ahead of Norway and behind group winner West Germany.

Saarbrücken would also make an appearance in the first edition of the European Cup (nowadays UEFA Champions League) as Saarland's representative, marking the only time the team (and any team representing Saarland or from the state of Saarland) ever played in UEFA competitions. Despite a 4–3 win at the San Siro in the first leg, they were eliminated by Milan in the first round after a comeback from the Italian team in Saarbrücken (1–4).

=== Return to German football and entry to the Bundesliga ===
Saarbrücken returned to the Oberliga Südwest in 1952 and continued their winning ways by winning the division and advancing to the national final for the second time, losing a 1–2 decision to VfB Stuttgart. They continued to field strong sides, but over the next decade, could only manage one more Oberliga title, in 1961.

In 1963, West Germany finally saw the creation of a top flight national league with the formation of the Bundesliga. Sixteen teams were selected to play in the new league based on their performance, financial health and a geographical distribution intended to fairly represent all parts of the country. The first eight selections were straightforward and included divisional champions and the national finalists. Saarbrücken's selection to the new league was arguably the most controversial as the club's recent record was not as strong as their divisional rivals Neunkirchen, FK Pirmasens and Wormatia Worms. The belief is that their advantage lay in the fact the club had a long association with Hermann Neuberger, an extremely influential figure in German football – and a member of the selection committee.

At the end of the inaugural Bundesliga season in 1963–64, Saarbrücken found themselves last, seven points short of safety. The club was relegated to the second tier Regionalliga Südwest where they finished strongly in each of the next three seasons, but were unable to advance through the Bundesliga promotion rounds. They were finally able to make their way back to the top flight after a first-place finish in the 2. Bundesliga Süd in the 1976 season. After two seasons there, the team returned to the second division and by 1981 had slipped to the Amateur Oberliga Südwest (III). There were two more turns in the Bundesliga, in 1986 and 1993, both ending in relegation. A financial crisis in 1995 led to the club being denied a license and being sent down to the Regionalliga West/Südwest (III). Saarbrücken has since become a yo-yo club with frequent moves between the second and fifth tiers. During this time, the club has remained a strong local side with several Saarland-Pokal wins to its credit.

Saarbrücken finished 16th in 2005–06 and were relegated to the Regionalliga Süd (III). Another poor showing in 2006–07 saw the club in 15th and relegated again, this time to the fourth division Oberliga Südwest, where they narrowly missed out on Regionalliga promotion in 2007–08. However, they finished as the champions of the Oberliga Südwest in the 2008–09 season and were promoted to the Regionalliga West. In May 2010, they finished champions of the Regionalliga West season and were promoted to the 3. Liga, their second consecutive promotion. They started slowly, but finished in sixth place having won the last nine matches of the 2010–11 season, and remained at this level until 2013–14, when a poor season saw then finish bottom of the table, having used 36 players and four managers.

Back in the Regionalliga, Saarbrücken came second in 2014–15 and qualified for the promotion round to the 3. Liga, where they missed out on promotion to the Würzburger Kickers. They won the Regionalliga Südwest by 11 points in 2017–18 but were again defeated in the promotion play-off, this time by 1860 Munich.

On 3 March 2020, they became the first team from the fourth tier in the history of the DFB-Pokal to reach the semi-final, after beating Fortuna Düsseldorf in the quarter-final. On 1 November 2023, Saarbrücken (as a 3. Liga side) achieved a 2–1 win against FC Bayern Munich to advance to the round of 16 in the 2023–24 DFB-Pokal. At this stage they met Eintracht Frankfurt, another of the most well-established teams in the Bundesliga. They won 2–0 against them, moving through to the quarterfinals. They went on to beat another Bundesliga side Borussia Mönchengladbach 2–1 to advance to the semi-finals for the 5th time in club history. They met the 2. Bundesliga side 1. FC Kaiserslautern in the semi-finals of the DFB-Pokal, losing at home 0–2.

== Reserve team ==
The club's reserve team, now the 1. FC Saarbrücken II, playing as the 1. FC Saarbrücken Amateure until 2005 during the times the senior side played in professional football, first made an appearance in the Ehrenliga Saarland from 1948 to 1951. It made a reappearance in the highest league of the state in 1986, now the tier four Verbandsliga Saarland and won the league in 1988. Nine seasons in the Oberliga Südwest, now the Oberliga Rheinland-Pfalz/Saar followed. The team was relegated from the Oberliga in 1997, 2001 and 2007 to return each time a short while later. In 2002 it won the Saarland Cup for the first and only time, thereby qualifying for the first round of the 2002–03 DFB-Pokal, where it lost to Arminia Bielefeld. It has been playing at this level since the last promotion in 2010, achieving a fourth-place finish as its best-ever result in 2013.

== Supporters and rivalries ==
The 1. FC Saarbrücken ultras maintain a long-standing friendship since 1998 with the ultras of the French club Nancy. They also had friendly relations with fans of Fortuna Düsseldorf & Austria Salzburg. 1. FC Kaiserslautern and neighbours FC Homburg are considered to be the biggest rivals. More recently, rivalries with Eintracht Trier and SV Elversberg have also developed.

The club has numerous supporter groups: Virage Est (meaning East Stand in French), Boys, SC95, Nordsaarjugend, Clique Canaille and Leone Pazzo, with around 200–300 people standing in the ultras section for matches. In celebration of the club's 110th birthday on 8 November 2014, the supporters created a huge tifo display.

== Honours ==
=== League ===
- German football championship
  - Runners-up: 1943, 1952
- Bezirksliga Rheinhessen-Saar (I)
  - Champions: 1926
- Bezirksliga Rhein-Saar (Saar division) (I)
  - Champions: 1928
- Gauliga Westmark (I)
  - Champions: 1942–43, 1943–44 (as KSG Saarbrücken)
- Oberliga Südwest (I)
  - Champions: 1945–46, 1951–52, 1960–61
- Ligue 2 (II)
  - Champions: 1948–49
- Regionalliga Südwest (II)
  - Champions: 1964–65
- 2nd Bundesliga Süd (II)
  - Champions: 1975–76
- 2. Bundesliga (southern group) (II)
  - Champions: 1991–92
- Oberliga Südwest (III–V)
  - Champions: 1982–83, 2008–09
- Regionalliga West/Südwest (III)
  - Champions: 1999–2000
- Regionalliga West (IV)
  - Champions: 2009–10
- Regionalliga Südwest (IV)
  - Champions: 2017–18, 2019–20

=== Cup ===
- DFB-Pokal
  - Semi-finals: 1956–57, 1957–58, 1984–85, 2019–20, 2023–24
- Saarland Cup (Tiers III–VII)
  - Winners: (12) 1997, 1998, 1999, 2000, 2004, 2011, 2012, 2013, 2017, 2019, 2024, 2026

=== Youth ===
- German Under 19 championship
  - Runners-up: 1969
- German Under 17 championship
  - Runners-up: 1996

=== Reserves ===
- Ehrenliga Saarland (I)
  - Champions: 1951
- Verbandsliga Saarland
  - Champions: 1988, 1998, 2010
  - Runners-up: 1987, 2002
- Saarland Cup
  - Winners: 2002

== Recent seasons ==
The recent season-by-season performance of the club:

=== 1. FC Saarbrücken ===
Season	Division	Position
1999–2000	Regionalliga West/Südwest	1st ↑
2000–01	2. Bundesliga	8th
2001–02	2. Bundesliga	16th ↓
2002–03	Regionalliga Süd	6th
2003–04	Regionalliga Süd	3rd ↑
2004–05	2. Bundesliga	12th
2005–06	2. Bundesliga	16th ↓
2006–07	Regionalliga Süd	15th ↓
2007–08	Oberliga Südwest	5th
2008–09	Oberliga Südwest	1st ↑
2009–10	Regionalliga West	1st ↑
2010–11	3. Liga	6th
2011–12	3. Liga	10th
2012–13	3. Liga	11th
2013–14	3. Liga	20th ↓
2014–15	Regionalliga Südwest	2nd
2015–16	Regionalliga Südwest	7th
2016–17	Regionalliga Südwest	3rd
2017–18	Regionalliga Südwest	1st
2018–19	Regionalliga Südwest	2nd
2019–20	Regionalliga Südwest	1st ↑
2020–21	3. Liga	5th
2021–22	3. Liga	7th
2022–23	3. Liga	5th
2023–24	3. Liga	5th
2024–25	3. Liga	3rd

=== 1. FC Saarbrücken II ===
Season	Division	Position
1999–2000	Oberliga Südwest	11th
2000–01	Oberliga Südwest	17th ↓
2001–02	Verbandsliga Saarland	2nd ↑
2002–03	Oberliga Südwest	14th
2003–04	Oberliga Südwest	5th
2004–05	Oberliga Südwest	6th
2005–06	Oberliga Südwest	5th
2006–07	Oberliga Südwest	6th ↓
2007–08	Verbandsliga Saarland	4th
2008–09	Verbandsliga Saarland	6th
2009–10	Verbandsliga Saarland	1st ↑
2010–11	Oberliga Südwest	14th
2011–12	Oberliga Südwest	9th
2012–13	Oberliga Rheinland-Pfalz/Saar	4th
2013–14	Oberliga Rheinland-Pfalz/Saar	11th
2014–15	Oberliga Rheinland-Pfalz/Saar	17th

- With the introduction of the Regionalligas in 1994 and the 3. Liga in 2008 as the new third tier, below the 2. Bundesliga, all leagues below dropped one tier.

== Players ==
=== Current squad ===
As of 14 July 2026

Note: Flags indicate national team as defined under FIFA eligibility rules; some limited exceptions apply. Players may hold more than one non-FIFA nationality.

No.	Pos.	Nation	Player
1	GK	AUT	Matteo Bignetti
3	DF	GER	Anton Bäuerle
4	DF	BEL	Siemen Voet
5	MF	GER	Daniel Gleiber (on loan from Mainz 05)
6	MF	GER	Patrick Sontheimer
7	DF	GER	Calogero Rizzuto
8	MF	TUR	Gökdeniz Gürpüz
9	FW	GER	Kai Brünker
10	MF	GER	Christian Kühlwetter
11	MF	GER	Maurice Multhaup
14	MF	ENG	Zac Shuaib
15	MF	GUI	Abdoulaye Kamara
16	FW	KOR	Lee Seung-joon
17	FW	GER	Abdenego Nankishi

No.	Pos.	Nation	Player
19	MF	GER	Sebastian Vasiliadis
20	MF	GER	Florian Pick (captain)
21	DF	BIH	Mladen Cvjetinović (on loan from Holstein Kiel)
22	MF	GER	Kaan Çalışkaner
23	GK	GER	Benjamin Lade
26	DF	GER	Nikola Aracic
28	DF	GER	Niko Bretschneider
29	FW	GER	Alexander Staff (on loan from Eintracht Frankfurt)
30	FW	GER	Dominic Baumann
31	MF	GER	Kelsey Owusu
33	GK	GER	Kevin Broll
34	MF	GER	Nils Krämer
39	FW	GER	Patrick Schmidt
42	DF	GER	Philip Fahrner

== Personnel ==
Current technical staff
Position	Name
Manager	(Germany) Argirios Giannikis
Assistant manager	(Germany) Bernd Heemsoth
Goalkeeping coach	(Germany) Frank Kackert
Scout	(Germany) Dieter Ferner
Physiotherapist	(Germany) Paulo da Palma
Doctor	(Germany) Roland Kuppig
Director of football	(Germany) Jürgen Luginger
Executive director	(Germany) David Fischer
Kit manager	(Germany) Rüdiger Schmidt
Board members
Office	Name
President	(Germany) Hartmut Ostermann
Vice-president	(Germany) Dieter Ferner
Board member	(Germany) Dieter Weller
Information and media officer	(Germany) Christoph Heiser
Chairman of the Supervisory Board	(Germany) Franz Abel
Deputy chairman of the Supervisory Board	(Germany) Egon Schmitt
Members of the Supervisory Board	(Germany) Claude Burgard (Germany) Eugen Hach (Germany) Horst Hinschberger (Germany) Joachim Klein (Germany) Leo Petry (Germany) Meiko Palm
