= Alemannia Aachen =

German football club

- Full name: Aachener Turn- und Sportverein Alemannia 1900 e. V.
- Nicknames: Kartoffelkäfer (potato beetles); Die Alemannen (the Alemanni)
- Founded: 16 December 1900; 125 years ago
- Ground: Tivoli
- Capacity: 32,960
- President: Björn Jansen
- Manager: Mersad Selimbegović
- League: 3. Liga
- 2025–26: 3. Liga, 12th of 20
- Website: www.alemannia-aachen.de
Home colours	Away colours

Aachener Turn- und Sportverein Alemannia 1900 e. V., short Alemannia Aachen (German pronunciation: [aleˈmani̯aː ˈʔaːxn̩]), is a German football club from the western city of Aachen, North Rhine-Westphalia. A long-term fixture of the country's second division, Alemannia enjoyed a three-year turn in the Bundesliga in the late 1960s and, after a successful 2005–06 campaign, returned to the first division for a single season. The club slipped to third-division play and in late 2012 entered into bankruptcy. They finished their 2012–13 3. Liga schedule before resuming play in the tier IV Regionalliga West in 2013–14.

In the 2023–24 Regionalliga, Alemannia finished 1st in the West Group, which got them immediately promoted to the 2024–25 3. Liga.

Alemannia carries the nickname "the potato beetles" (Kartoffelkäfer) because of their traditionally striped yellow-black jerseys, which make them look like the particular insects. The home of Alemannia is the Tivoli.

== History ==
=== Foundation to World War II ===
In the second half of the 19th century, resident English workers and businessmen brought football, in addition to the traditional equestrian sports, into the western Rhineland. The club was founded on 16 December 1900 by a group of eighteen high school students. Knowing that another team had already taken the name 1. FC Aachen, the new club was christened FC Alemannia, using the Latin word for Germany (see Alamannia). The First World War devastated the club: the pre-war membership of 200 was reduced to a mere 37 by the conflict. In early 1919 Alemannia merged with local sports club Aachener Turnverein 1847 to become TSV Alemannia Aachen 1900. Their new partner's interest was primarily in gymnastics rather than football and as a result the union was short-lived, with the clubs splitting again in 1924.

The city of Aachen is very near the Belgian and Dutch borders and as a result Alemannia has had frequent contact with clubs from those countries. Their first game was against the Belgian side R. Dolhain F.C., one of that country's earliest clubs. There are intensive and friendly contacts with the Dutch professional club Roda JC Kerkrade. Both clubs have the same club colors.

The team played in the Rhineland-Westphalia FA and won its first championship there in 1907, before joining the newly formed Westdeutsche Fussball Verband in 1909. The club grew steadily as interest in football increased. They qualified for the Rheingauliga in 1921, built their own stadium in 1928, and earned admittance to the Oberliga the following year.

The club enjoyed some success in the early 1930s by advancing to the final four of the Westdeutsche championship playoffs. In 1933, German football was re-organized under the Third Reich into sixteen top-flight Gauligen. Alemannia played several seasons in the Gauliga Mittelrhein in the late 1930s and early 1940s. They finished top in their division in 1938 and advanced to the national final rounds. This was in spite of a protest by SV Beuel 06 which ultimately saw that club awarded the division championship, but too late to allow Beuel to play in the national playoff in Aachen's stead.

Alemannia is known as one of the few sports clubs of this era to offer any challenge to the Nazi regime's purge of Jews from the country's sports organizations by demanding the release of a jailed Jewish member.

=== Postwar and entry to the Bundesliga ===
In 1946, after World War II and the lifting of the ban placed by Allied occupation authorities on most types of organizations in Germany, Alemannia re-constituted itself and began play in second tier Rheinbezirk. They returned to first division play in the Oberliga West the next year, but ran into financial difficulty. They remained a steady, but unspectacular second division side, generally finishing mid-table.

Aachen's first measure of success came with an advance to the DFB-Pokal final in 1953 where they lost a 1–2 decision to Rot-Weiss Essen.

After the formation of the Bundesliga, Germany's new professional football league, in 1963, Alemannia found themselves in Regionalliga West (II). In 1965, they had another good run in German Cup competition, earning another final appearance – but were once again unsuccessful – this time losing 0–2 to Borussia Dortmund.

The club captured their division in 1967 and were promoted to the Bundesliga (I) for the 1967–68 season. They enjoyed their best ever result the next year with a second-place finish behind champion Bayern Munich. However, the following season was a disaster: the team earned only one point in play away from home and toppled to an 18th-place finish. They returned to play in the Regionalliga West (II), and in 1990 fell still further to the third division.

=== Road to recovery ===
Former logo of Alemannia Aachen

After several mediocre seasons in the second half of the 1990s, trainer Werner Fuchs rejuvenated the Alemannia squad by playing 4–4–2 without a libero (sweeper), creating a side that played an attractive, fluid offense. In 1999, the team played well and delivered an especially strong second half. They were atop the table, just weeks away from the end of the season, when tragedy struck with the unexpected death of Fuchs. The whole city was in shock, but the club managed to pull through, dedicating their promotion to their late trainer and winning the Regionalliga West/Südwest (III). The first years in the 2. Bundesliga were tough for Aachen, both on the field and financially. The club struggled for several seasons and the situation was worsened when financial irregularities were uncovered showing the club was near bankruptcy.

The turnaround came with a new executive board under president Horst Heinrichs, trainer Jörg Berger and manager Jörg Schmadtke. Through improved financial management, shrewd player signings, and clever game tactics, Aachen became a power once again in the 2003–04 season. They played their way to their third DFB-Pokal final appearance, knocking off TSV 1860 Munich, Bayern Munich, and Borussia Mönchengladbach, before losing 2–3 to Bundesliga champions Werder Bremen. As league champions Bremen already held a place in the UEFA Champions League, thereby making room for Aachen to take part in the UEFA Cup competition. They delivered a decent performance, advancing to the Round of 32 before going out to eventual semi-finalists AZ Alkmaar. The club's participation in the German Cup and UEFA Cup play helped to significantly improve their financial situation.

=== Bundesliga and 2. Bundesliga ===
On 16 April 2006, Alemannia became the first team to earn promotion to the Bundesliga in 2005–06, ending Aachen's 36-year absence from top-flight football. However, they stayed up only a single season as they took only one point from their last eight matches of the campaign. In the middle of 2007, the club appointed former German international defender and 1990 FIFA World Champion Guido Buchwald as manager trainer, who was fired after only 14 matches. After a short interim with Alemannia's Sportsmanger Jörg Schmadtke as headcoach, he was then replaced by Jürgen Seeberger, hardly known in Germany, in the winter break of the season.

The club suffered a rapid decline after its single Bundesliga season, being relegated from the 2. Bundesliga in 2012 and from the 3. Liga the 2013 season. Alemannia returned to 3. Liga in 2024. The seasons 2024–25, 2025–26 has remained to 3.Liga.

== Supporters ==
Alemannia Aachen has had ties to hard-right supporters since at least the 2010s. In the early 2010s, right-wing supporters in the fan scene were reported to have driven out left-wing fans, and rivalries within the ultra scene sometimes had a political dimension. Police and club representatives have stated that these politically charged disputes were largely settled by 2013.

During the 2010s and 2020s, far-right individuals continued to be present at matches, including members of hooligan groups such as Boxstaffel 520 and the Wagner Group. In February 2024, the Aachen police confirmed that no structured far-right networks were active within the fan scene, but individual far-right supporters were known to attend matches.

In August 2024, investigative reports highlighted close contacts between the club leadership and certain far-right hooligans, including the leader of Boxstaffel 520, prompting clarification from the club and police. Throughout this period, far-right supporters were intermittently present in the club's fan base, and incidents involving them sometimes escalated into violence or public attention, prompting official responses from the club and police. Kevin "Chemo" Polz, also known as Kevin P., is the leader of the far-right hooligan group Boxstaffel 520 associated with Alemannia Aachen. He has been identified by the Aachen police as part of the right-wing scene, though most members of the group are not politically extreme. In 2024, Polz was taken into custody on suspicion of attempted manslaughter. The club has faced criticism for its past closeness to him and other far-right supporters, which was highlighted in media investigations. Following public scrutiny, Alemannia Aachen has stated that it does not tolerate far-right activity, has imposed stadium bans, and is monitoring the situation closely, including Polz's presence at matches. In August 2024, following media reports about Alemannia Aachen's close contacts with far-right supporters such as Polz, both supervisory board chairman Marcel Moberz and managing director Sascha Eller publicly acknowledged mistakes in handling these relationships. They stated that the club had allowed proximity to individuals from the far-right spectrum, creating a "bubble" that the club had been drawn into.

On 25 January 2025, at an away match against SC Verl, members of the Wagner Group provoked other fans, leading to a brawl that caused several injuries. Following this incident, Alemannia Aachen announced indefinite stadium bans for far-right supporters and measures against far-right symbols, including reinforced admission controls and collaboration with fan representatives.

== Seasons ==
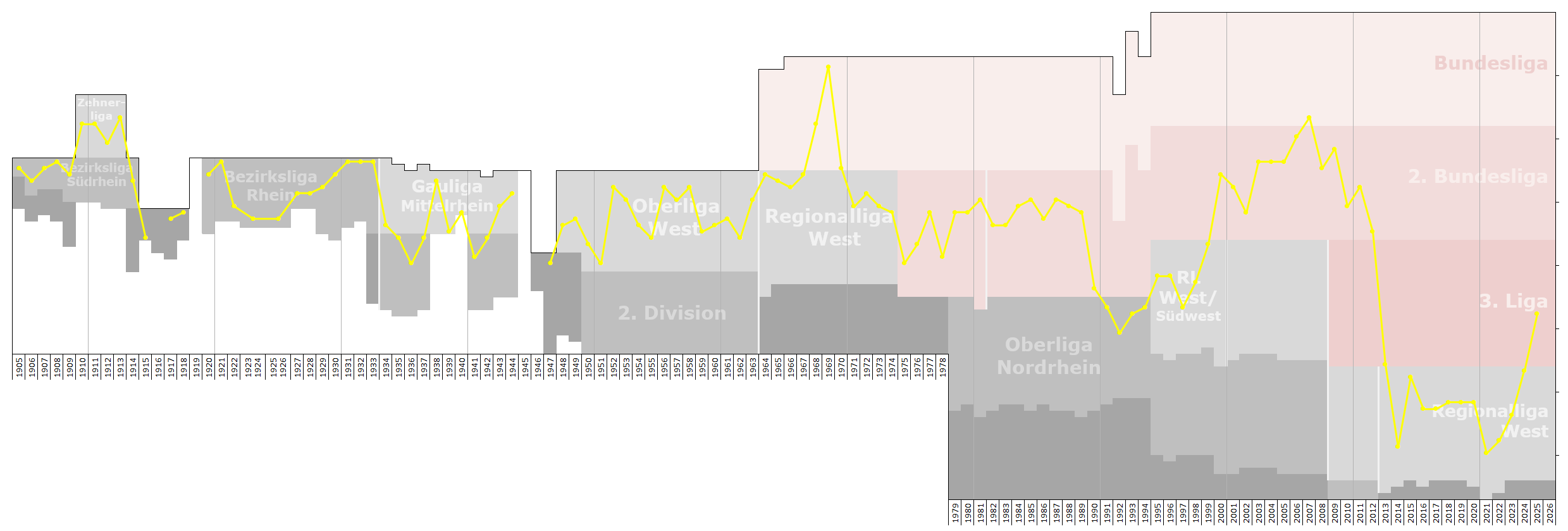
Historical chart of Alemannia Aachen league performance

=== Bundesliga and 2. Bundesliga ===
Year	Division	Position	Cup	Europe
1967–68	Bundesliga (I)	11th	?	?
1968–69	Bundesliga (I)	2nd	?	?
1969–70	Bundesliga (I)	18th (relegated)	?	?
1999–2000	2. Bundesliga (II)	8th	First round	Not Qualified
2000–2001	2. Bundesliga (II)	10th	Second round	Not Qualified
2001–2002	2. Bundesliga (II)	14th	Second round	Not Qualified
2002–2003	2. Bundesliga (II)	6th	First round	Not Qualified
2003–2004	2. Bundesliga (II)	6th	Final	Not Qualified
2004–2005	2. Bundesliga (II)	6th	Second round	UEFA Cup Round of 32
2005–2006	2. Bundesliga (II)	2nd (promoted)	Second round	Not Qualified
2006–2007	Bundesliga (I)	17th (relegated)	Quarter-finals	Not Qualified
2007–2008	2. Bundesliga (II)	7th	Third round	Not Qualified
2008–2009	2. Bundesliga (II)	4th	Second round	Not Qualified
2009–2010	2. Bundesliga (II)	13th	Second round	Not Qualified
2010–2011	2. Bundesliga (II)	10th	Quarter-finals	Not Qualified
2011–2012	2. Bundesliga (II)	17th (relegated)	First round	Not Qualified

=== 3. Liga and Regionalliga West ===
Year	Division	Position	Cup	FVM Cup
2012–13	3. Liga (III)	20th (relegated)	First round	Final
2013–14	Regionalliga West (IV)	13th	Not Qualified	First round
2014–15	Regionalliga West (IV)	2nd	Not Qualified	Semi-final
2015–16	Regionalliga West (IV)	7th	Not Qualified	First round
2016–17	Regionalliga West (IV)	7th	Not Qualified	Second round
2017–18	Regionalliga West (IV)	6th	Not Qualified	Final
2018–19	Regionalliga West (IV)	6th	Not Qualified	Winner
2019–20	Regionalliga West (IV)	6th	First round	Final
2020–21	Regionalliga West (IV)	14th	Not Qualified	Final
2021–22	Regionalliga West (IV)	12th	Not Qualified	Semi-final
2022–23	Regionalliga West (IV)	8th	Not Qualified	Quarter-final
2023–24	Regionalliga West (IV)	1st (promoted)	Not Qualified	Winner
2024–25	3. Liga (III)	12th	First round	Final
2025–26	3. Liga (III)	7th	Not Qualified	Quarter-final

== Players ==
=== Current squad ===
As of 3 September 2026

Note: Flags indicate national team as defined under FIFA eligibility rules; some limited exceptions apply. Players may hold more than one non-FIFA nationality.

No.	Pos.	Nation	Player
1	GK	GER	Manuel Riemann
2	DF	GRE	Petros Bagalianis
3	DF	GER	Matti Wagner
4	DF	AUS	Dylan Leonard (on loan from Schalke 04)
7	MF	GER	Lukas Scepanik
8	FW	GER	Louis Köster
9	FW	GER	Daniel Starodid
10	MF	GER	Mehdi Loune
11	MF	GER	Meiko Wäschenbach
15	DF	GER	Mika Hanraths (captain)
17	FW	GER	Fabio Torsiello (on loan from Darmstadt 98)
18	FW	GER	Ken Izekor
19	FW	FRA	Nathan Bitumazala

No.	Pos.	Nation	Player
20	FW	GER	Georg Ermolaev (on loan from SC Paderborn)
21	DF	GER	Gideon Jung
22	GK	NED	Tom Hendriks
23	GK	FRA	Stefan Bajić
27	FW	GER	Mika Schroers
28	MF	GER	Danilo Wiebe
29	DF	GER	Kacper Koscierski (on loan from VfL Bochum)
30	MF	GER	Justin von der Hitz (on loan from 1. FC Nürnberg)
33	DF	GER	Marius Wegmann
37	DF	ANG	Joel da Silva Kiala
38	FW	KOS	Valmir Sulejmani
44	MF	GER	Jonas Oehmichen
49	MF	GER	Mika Pobrić

=== Out on loan ===
Note: Flags indicate national team as defined under FIFA eligibility rules; some limited exceptions apply. Players may hold more than one non-FIFA nationality.

No.	Pos.	Nation	Player
—	FW	GER	Emmanuel Elekwa (at Barockstadt Fulda-Lehnerz until 30 June 2027)

== Honours ==
- Bundesliga
  - Runners-up: 1968–69
- 2. Bundesliga
  - Runners-up: 2005–06
- Regionalliga West (II–IV)
  - Champions: 1964, 1966–67, 2023–24
- DFB-Pokal
  - Runners-up: 1952–53, 1964–65, 2003–04
- Middle Rhine Cup (Tiers III–V)
  - Winners: 1992–93, 1993–94, 1996–97, 1998–99, 2002, 2006, 2019, 2024
- Western German Cup Winner:
  - 1966–67

== Notable players ==
Past (and present) players who are the subjects of Wikipedia articles can be found here.

Belgium

- (Belgium) Roger Claessen

Bosnia and Herzegovina

- (Bosnia and Herzegovina) Ivica Grlić
- (Bosnia and Herzegovina) Denis Pozder

Germany

- (Germany) Reinhold Münzenberg
- (Germany) Jupp Derwall
- (Germany) Reinhold Yabo
- (Germany) Lewis Holtby
- (Germany) Marco Stiepermann
- (Germany) Kai Havertz
- (Germany) Torsten Frings
- (Germany) David Odonkor
- (Germany) Jan Schlaudraff

Netherlands

- (Netherlands) Angelo Nijskens

Romania

- (Romania) Ion Ionescu

=== Coaching history ===
Alemannia Aachen coaching history from 1987 to present
(Germany) Diethelm Ferner – 1987; (Germany) Peter Neururer – 1987–1989; (Germany) Rolf Grünther – 1989; (Turkey) Mustafa Denizli – 1989–1990; (Germany) Eckhard Krautzun – 1990; (Germany) Norbert Wagner – 1990–1991; (Germany) Michael Schleiden – 1991; (Germany) Wilfried Hannes – 1991–1994; (Germany) Helmut Graf – 1994; (Germany) Gerd vom Bruch – 1994–1996; (Germany) Werner Fuchs – 1996–1999; (Germany) André Winkhold – 1999; (Germany) Eugen Hach – 1999–2001; (Germany) Jörg Berger – 2001–2004; (Germany) Dieter Hecking – 2004–2006; (Germany) Michael Frontzeck – 2006–2007; (Germany) Guido Buchwald – 2007; (Germany) Jörg Schmadtke – 2007; (Germany) Jürgen Seeberger – 2008–2009	(Germany) Willi Kronhardt 2009; (Germany) Michael Krüger 2009–2010; (Germany) Peter Hyballa 2010–2011; (Germany) Friedhelm Funkel 2011–2012; (Germany) Ralf Außem 2011, 2012; (Netherlands) René van Eck 2012–2013; (Germany) Peter Schubert 2013–2015; (Germany) Christian Benbennek 2015; (Germany) Fuat Kılıç 2015–2020; (Germany) Stefan Vollmerhausen 2020–2021; (Denmark) Kristoffer Andersen 2021; (Germany) Patrick Helmes 2021; (Germany) Fuat Kılıç 2021–2022; (Germany) Helge Hohl 2022–2023; (Germany) Heiner Backhaus 2023–2025; (Germany) Benedetto Muzzicato 2025; (Bosnia and Herzegovina) Mersad Selimbegović 2025–

== Stadium ==
Alemannia Aachen used to play at the Old Tivoli which had a capacity of 21,632 spectators (3,632 seats). One of Germany's better known stadiums, it was built in 1928 and was renovated several times. The club played its 2004 UEFA Cup matches, however, in Cologne's RheinEnergieStadion in order to meet the stadium capacity requirements in place for the competition.

In August 2009, Aachen opened a new stadium, the New Tivoli, which has a capacity of 32,960 spectators (11,681 in standing areas).

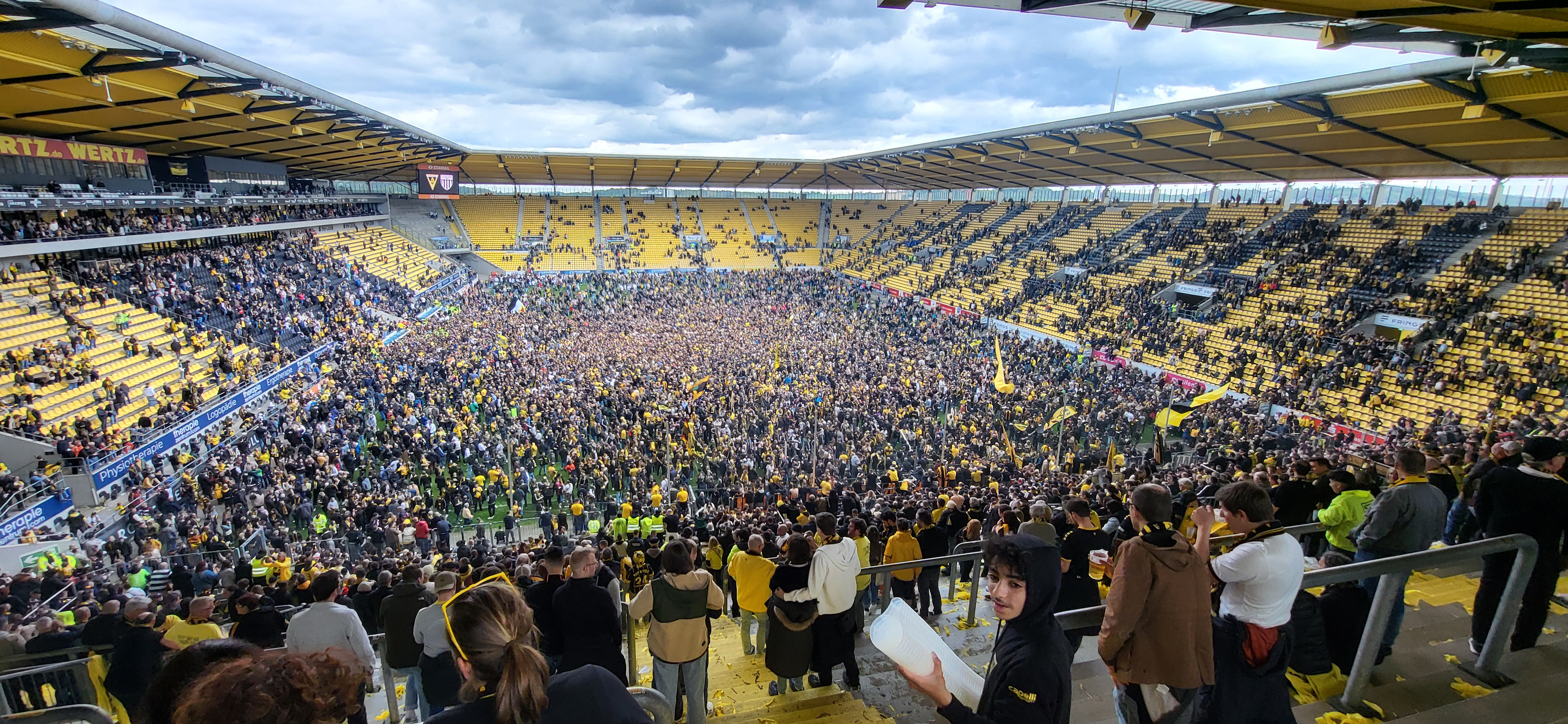
Pitch invasion at Aachen's Tivoli after Alemannia Aachen's confirmed promotion to the 3rd football league on April 27th, 2024

== Basketball ==
Alemania Aachen also had a successful basketball department reaching the German Championship final twice in 1959 and 1962. The team eventually won the title two consecutive seasons (1963 and 1964). The finals are listed below:

- 1959, 09.05.59 Augsburg: USC Heidelberg – Alemannia Aachen 56–42
- 1962, 21.05.62 Wiesbaden: USC Heidelberg – Alemannia Aachen 69–65
- 1963, 19.05.63 Frankfurt-Höchst: Alemannia Aachen – Neuköllner SF (Berlin) 59–49
- 1964, 24.05.64 Essen: Alemannia Aachen – SSV Hagen 72–59

=== Honours ===
Basketball Bundesliga:

- Champions : 1963, 1964
- Runners-up : 1959, 1962

=== Logo history ===
Alemannia's logos can be seen at Alemannia Aachen logo history.
