= Marius Wegmann =

German footballer (born 1998)

Personal information
- Date of birth: 3 September 1998 (age 28)
- Place of birth: Pfullendorf, Germany
- Height: 1.83 m (6 ft 0 in)
- Position: Centre-back

Team information
- Current team: Alemannia Aachen
- Number: 33

Youth career
- TSV Aach-Linz
- FV Ravensburg
- 2013–2015: SC Pfullendorf
- 2016–2017: Rot-Weiß Erfurt

Senior career*
Years	Team	Apps	(Gls)
2017–2019	Rot-Weiß Erfurt	28	(1)
2019–2022	FV Illertissen	62	(5)
2022–2024	Würzburger Kickers	55	(9)
2024–2025	SV Wehen Wiesbaden	0	(0)
2025–	Alemannia Aachen	27	(2)
- * Club domestic league appearances and goals as of 28 May 2026

Marius Wegmann (born 3 September 1998) is a German footballer who plays as a centre-back for 3. Liga club Alemannia Aachen.

== Club career ==
On 24 June 2024, Wegmann signed with SV Wehen Wiesbaden in 3. Liga.
