= Lee Seung-joon (footballer) =

South Korean footballer (born 2004)

- Lee in 2023

Personal information
- Date of birth: 11 August 2004 (age 22)
- Place of birth: South Korea
- Height: 1.74 m (5 ft 9 in)
- Position: Winger

Team information
- Current team: 1. FC Saarbrücken
- Number: 16

Youth career
- –2024: FC Seoul

Senior career*
Years	Team	Apps	(Gls)
2023–2024	FC Seoul	10	(0)
2025–2026	Khor Fakkan	1	(0)
2026	→ Yongin (loan)	12	(3)
2026–	1. FC Saarbrücken	0	(0)

International career^{‡}
2023	South Korea U20	2	(0)
2025	South Korea U22	1	(0)
- * Club domestic league appearances and goals as of 6 June 2026 ‡ National team caps and goals as of 5 June 2025

Lee Seung-joon (Korean: 이승준; born 11 August 2004) is a South Korean professional footballer who plays as a winger for German 3. Liga club 1. FC Saarbrücken.

== Early life ==
Lee was born on 11 August 2004 in South Korea. The son of South Korea international Lee Eul-yong, he is the younger brother of South Korea international Lee Tae-seok. Growing up, he attended Osan High School in South Korea.

== Club career ==
As a youth player, Lee joined the youth academy of South Korean side FC Seoul and was promoted to the club's senior team ahead of the 2023 season, where he made ten league appearances and scored zero goals. Following his stint there, he signed for Emirati side Khor Fakkan.

== International career ==
Lee is a South Korea youth international. During the summer of 2023, he played for the South Korea national under-20 football team at the 2023 FIFA U-20 World Cup.

== Style of play ==
Lee plays as a winger and is right-footed. South Korean news website Naver wrote in 2023 that he "is an all-round midfielder who can play in a variety of positions, from central midfielder to attacking winger. He is good at pressing the opponents from the attacking zone... his strengths are smooth and fast dribbling. He is also excellent at breaking through the opposing defense to relieve pressure, or in a narrow space to receive the ball and attack".
