= Eugen Hach =

German footballer

Personal information
- Date of birth: 19 September 1960 (age 66)
- Place of birth: Kaiserslautern, West Germany
- Height: 1.75 m (5 ft 9 in)
- Position: Defender

Senior career*
Years	Team	Apps	(Gls)
1979–1982	1. FC Kaiserslautern II		
1982–1983	SV Südwest Ludwigshafen		
1983–1984	FK Pirmasens		
1984–1987	Alemannia Aachen		
1987–1992	1. FC Saarbrücken		

Managerial career
- 1992–1993: 1. FC Saarbrücken II
- 1995–1996: SC Halberg Brebach
- 1996–1999: Waldhof Mannheim (assistant)
- 1999–2001: Alemannia Aachen
- 2001–2003: Greuther Fürth
- 2003–2004: 1. FC Saarbrücken
- 2004: Waldhof Mannheim
- 2004–2005: Rot-Weiß Oberhausen
- 2005–2006: Eintracht Trier
- * Club domestic league appearances and goals

Eugen Hach (born 19 September 1960) is a German football manager and former player who played as a defender.
