= Matteo Bignetti =

Austrian footballer (born 2004)

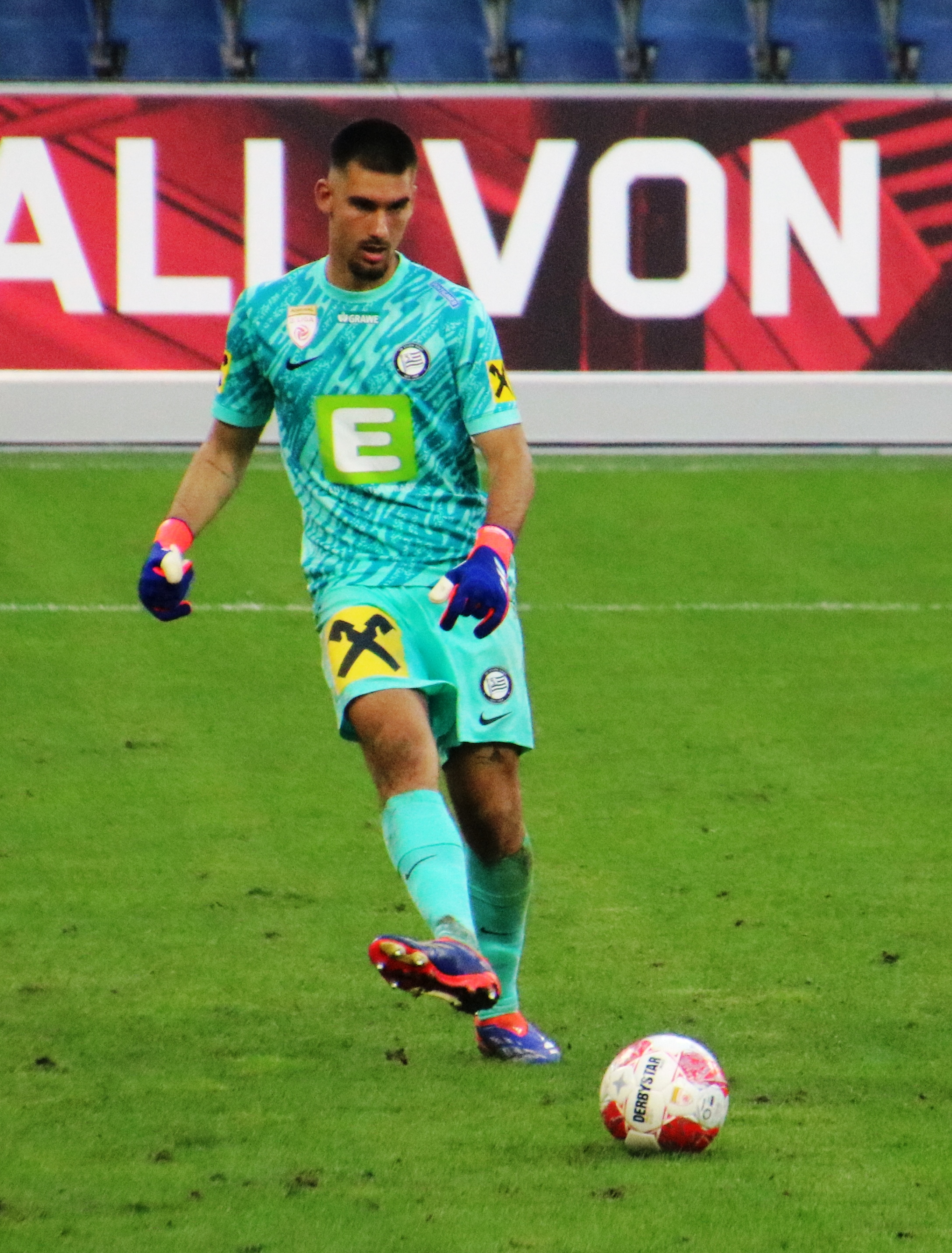
- Bignetti in 2024

Personal information
- Date of birth: 6 May 2004 (age 22)
- Place of birth: Bruck an der Mur, Austria
- Height: 1.90 m (6 ft 3 in)
- Position: Goalkeeper

Team information
- Current team: 1. FC Saarbrücken
- Number: 1

Youth career
- 2013–2016: Grazer AK
- 2013–2020: Sturm Graz
- 2020–2022: Eintracht Frankfurt

Senior career*
Years	Team	Apps	(Gls)
2022–2023	Eintracht Frankfurt II	18	(0)
2023–2025	Sturm Graz II	52	(1)
2023–2026	Sturm Graz	10	(0)
2026–	1. FC Saarbrücken	0	(0)

International career^{‡}
2018–2019	Austria U15	7	(1)
2019–2020	Austria U16	6	(1)
2020	Austria U17	1	(0)
2021–2022	Austria U18	6	(1)
2022	Austria U19	2	(0)
2025	Austria U21	3	(0)
- * Club domestic league appearances and goals as of 17 May 2026 (UTC) ‡ National team caps and goals as of 18:22, 1 May 2026 (UTC)

Matteo Bignetti (born 6 May 2004) is an Austrian professional footballer who plays as a goalkeeper for 3. Liga club 1. FC Saarbrücken.

== Club career ==
Bignetti is a product of the youth academies of the Austrian clubs Grazer AK and Sturm Graz, before moving to Germany with Eintracht Frankfurt on 6 May 2020 to finish his development. He was promoted to Eintracht Frankfurt's newly created reserves in 2022, and helped them win the Hessenliga to earn promotion to the Regionalliga.

On 6 June 2023, he returned to Sturm Graz on a contract until 2026 and was initially assigned to their reserves in the 2. Liga. He debuted with the senior Sturm Graz team in a 4–0 Austrian Cup win over SK Bischofshofen on 25 July 2025.

During his time in Sturm Graz II, Bignetti scored a 94th-minute header against FC Liefering in a 2–2 draw on 30 August 2024.

On 3 June 2026, German 3. Liga club 1. FC Saarbrücken announced the signing of Bignetti on a free transfer from Sturm Graz.

== International career ==
Bignetti was born in Austria to an Italian father and Austrian mother. He was called up to the Austria U21s in March 2025.

Bignetti was one of the players who were called up with the Austria national team by head coach Ralf Rangnick for the 2026–27 UEFA Nations League B matches against Kosovo and Republic of Ireland on 1 and 4 October 2026.

== Honours ==
Eintracht Frankfurt II

- Hessenliga: 2022–23

Sturm Graz

- Austrian Football Bundesliga: 2023–24, 2024–25
- Austrian Cup: 2023–24
