= Peter Schubert (football manager) =

German football coach

Peter Schubert is a German football coach who was most recently the head coach for Alemannia Aachen. He had previously been the head coach for VfB Lübeck and Alemannia Aachen II.

== Coaching career ==
=== VfB Lübeck ===
Schubert took over as head coach of VfB Lübeck on 1 July 2008. His first match in–charge was a 1–0 loss to SV Babelsberg 03. He finished his first season with a 1–0 loss to local rivals Holstein Kiel, and with a record of 10 wins, 15 draws, and nine losses which was good enough for eighth place. He started the 2009–10 season with a 2–1 win against 1. FSV Mainz 05 in the DFB-Pokal on 31 July 2009. The first league match of the season was a 1–1 draw against 1. FC Magdeburg on 8 August 2009. They were knocked out of the DFB-Pokal by VfB Stuttgart in extra time on 23 September 2009. They finished the 2009–10 season with a 1–1 draw against Hallescher FC on 29 May 2010. In his third season in–charge, the club again started their league season against 1. FC Magdeburg on 8 August 2010. However, this time it was a 2–0 loss. The following week, on 13 August 2010, MSV Duisburg knocked Lübeck out of the DFB-Pokal. They finished the season with a 3–2 loss to Energie Cottbus II. He started his fourth season on 6 August 2011 with a 3–3 draw against VFC Plauen. Schubert was sacked on 7 November 2011. His final match was a 2–0 win against Hamburger SV II.

=== Alemannia Aachen ===
Schubert was head coach of Alemannia Aachen II during the 2012–13 season. His final match was a 3–1 loss to Spvg. Wesseling-Urfeld on 9 June 2013. Schubert took over Alemannia Aachen's first team on an interim basis from 3 September 2012 to 10 September 2012 when René van Eck was hired as the permanent head coach. Van Eck was hired before any matches were played under Schubert. Schubert took over Alemannia Aachen on a permanent basis on 1 June 2013. His first match was a 3–1 win against Fortuna Köln on 26 July 2013. The first match of the 2014–15 season was a 1–0 win against SG Wattenscheid 09. He left the club after the 2014–15 season. His final match was a 7–0 win against Sportfreunde Siegen on 23 May 2015. He was eventually replaced by Christian Benbennek. He finished with a record of 33 wins, 18 draws, and 18 losses in 69 matches.

== Coaching record ==
As of 7 June 2015

Team	From	To	Record								
Team	From	To	M	W	D	L	GF	GA	GD	Win %	Ref.
VfB Lübeck	1 July 2008	7 November 2011	117	49	33	35	164	145	+19	41.88	
Alemannia Aachen II	1 July 2012	9 June 2013	30	12	7	11	48	37	+11	40.00	
Alemannia Aachen	3 September 2012	10 September 2012	0	0	0	0	0	0	+0	—	
Alemannia Aachen	1 June 2013	23 May 2015	69	33	18	18	98	66	+32	47.83	
Total			216	94	58	64	310	248	+62	43.52	—
