= Joel da Silva Kiala =

Angolan footballer (born 2004)

Personal information
- Full name: Joel Miguel da Silva Kiala
- Date of birth: 21 January 2004 (age 22)
- Place of birth: Berlin, Germany
- Height: 1.89 m (6 ft 2 in)
- Position: Centre-back

Team information
- Current team: Alemannia Aachen
- Number: 37

Youth career
- 2010–2011: Rotation Prenzlauer Berg
- 2011–2022: Hertha BSC

Senior career*
Years	Team	Apps	(Gls)
2022–2024	Hertha BSC II	45	(2)
2024–2025	Eintracht Frankfurt II	29	(0)
2025–	Alemannia Aachen	31	(0)

International career^{‡}
2022–2023	Germany U19	3	(0)
2024–	Angola	2	(0)
- * Club domestic league appearances and goals as of 28 May 2026 ‡ National team caps and goals as of 15:12, 30 August 2024 (UTC)

Joel Miguel da Silva Kiala (born 21 January 2004) is a professional footballer who plays as a centre-back for 3. Liga club Alemannia Aachen. Born in Germany, he plays for the Angola national team.

== Career ==
Da Silva Kiala is a youth product of Rotation Prenzlauer Berg before moving to the youth academy of Hertha BSC, where he climbed up their youth levels. In 2022, he debuted with Hertha BSC II in the Regionalliga. On 27 May 2023, he was on the bench for the senior Hertha squad for the first time. On 26 July 2024, he transferred to Eintracht Frankfurt II

== International career ==
Da Silva Kiala was born in Germany and is of Angolan descent. He is a former youth international for Germany, having played for the Germany U19s in 2023. He was part of the Angola national team that won the 2024 COSAFA Cup.

== Honours ==
Angola

- COSAFA Cup: 2024
