= 1948–49 French Division 2 =

10th season of the second-tier football league in France

Division 2
- Season: 1948–49

Statistics of Division 2 in the 1948–49 season.

== Overview ==
It was contested by 19 teams, and Lens won the championship.

== League standings ==
Pos	Team	Pld	W	D	L	GF	GA	GD	Pts	Promotion or relegation
1	Lens	36	21	11	4	65	27	+38	53	Promoted
2	Girondins Bordeaux	36	24	5	7	107	49	+58	53	Promoted
3	Rouen	36	20	11	5	67	37	+30	51	
4	Le Havre	36	19	10	7	64	30	+34	48	
5	Nîmes Olympique	36	16	10	10	89	51	+38	42	
6	Olympique Alès	36	16	10	10	76	57	+19	42	
7	Besançon	36	15	10	11	81	59	+22	40	
8	AS Monaco	36	17	4	15	70	62	+8	38	
9	Nantes	36	13	12	11	58	53	+5	38	
10	Lyon OU	36	16	6	14	65	72	−7	38	
11	Angers	36	11	15	10	61	49	+12	37	
12	Béziers	36	13	5	18	58	65	−7	31	
13	Toulon	36	11	8	17	54	70	−16	30	
14	Amiens	36	12	5	19	46	70	−24	29	
15	Le Mans	36	11	6	19	60	92	−32	28	
16	AS Troyes	36	9	7	20	52	90	−38	25	
17	Valenciennes	36	8	8	20	38	76	−38	24	
18	CA Paris	36	5	10	21	35	82	−47	20	
19	Douai	36	5	7	24	36	90	−54	17	

Source: rsssf.com

1. FC Saarbrücken took part in the competition as a guest team and finished in first place with a reported record of 26 wins, 7 draws and 5 defeats from 38 games, but were refused promotion or further participation.
